= List of LGBTQ-related films of 2006 =

This is a list of lesbian, gay, bisexual, transgender or queer-related films released in 2006. It contains theatrically released films that deal with important gay, lesbian, bisexual, transgender or queer characters or issues and may have same-sex romance or relationships as a plot device.

== Films ==
Title	Director	Country	Genre	Cast	Notes
533 Statements	Tori Foster	Canada	Documentary	Interviews with young Canadian lesbians, bisexuals, and transgender individuals	it premiered at the 2006 Inside Out Film and Video Festival, where it was co-winner with Amnesia: The James Brighton Enigma of the award for 'Best Canadian Feature Film'.
Les Amants du Flore	Ilan Duran Cohen	France	Biopic	Anne Mouglais, Lorànt Deutsch, Caroline Sihol, Kal Weber, Clémence Poésy	Film about Jean-Paul Sartre and Simone de Beauvoir, which depicts the latter's lesbian relationships as well.
Another Gay Movie	Todd Stephens	United States	Comedy	Michael Carbonaro, Jonah Blechman, Jonathan Chase, Mitch Morris, Ashlie Atkinson and Scott Thompson	
Antônia – O Filme	Tata Amaral	Brazil	Musical, drama	Negra Li, Cindy Mendes and Leilah Moreno	
Art School Confidential	Terry Zwigoff	United States	Comedy, drama	Max Minghella, Sophia Myles, John Malkovich, Anjelica Huston, Jim Broadbent, Matt Keeslar, Ethan Suplee and Joel David Moore	Screenplay by Daniel Clowes, based on his black-and-white comic of the same name
Azuloscurocasinegro	Daniel Sánchez Arévalo	Spain	Drama	Quim Gutiérrez, Marta Etura, Antonio de la Torre and Raúl Arévalo	a.k.a. Dark Blue Almost Black
Big Bang Love, Juvenile A	Takashi Miike	Japan	Drama	Ryuhei Matsuda, Masanobu Andō, Shunsuke Kubozuka, Kiyohiko Shibukawa, Jo Kanamori, Kenichi Endō, Renji Ishibashi, Ryo Ishibashi and Shirō Kazuki	a.k.a. 46-okunen no koi
Boy Culture	Q. Allan Brocka	United States	Drama	Derek Magyar, Darryl Stephens and Patrick Bauchau	Based on the novel of the same name by Matthew Rettenmund
Boys Love	Kôtarô Terauchi	Japan	Drama	Yoshikazu Kotani, Takumi Saitoh (credited as Takumi Saito), Hiroya Matsumoto and Masahi Taniguchi	
Broken Sky	Julián Hernández	Mexico	Drama	Miguel Ángel Hoppe, Fernando Arroyo, Alejandro Rojo, Ignacio Pereda, Klaudia Aragon and Clarissa Rendón	a.k.a. El cielo dividido
The Bubble	Eytan Fox	Israel	Drama	Ohad Knoller, Yousef Sweid, Daniela Virtzer, Alon Friedman, Zohar Liba, Ruba Blal and Shredy Jabarin	a.k.a. Ha-Buah
Bugcrush	Carter Smith	United States	Short, horror	Josh Caras, Donald Cumming, Eleonore Hendricks, David Tennent, Alex Toumayan, Billy P. and Harlan Baker	36 mins long
Coffee Date	Stewart Wade	United States	Comedy	Jonathan Bray, Wilson Cruz, Jonathan Silverman, Sally Kirkland and Elaine Hendrix	Expanded from Wade's short film of the same name
Colma: The Musical	Richard Wong	United States	Musical, drama	Jake Moreno, H.P. Mendoza, L.A. Renigen, Sigrid Sutter, Larry Soriano, Brian Raffi, Gigi Guizado, Paul Kolsanoff, Allison Torneros, Kat Kneisel and David Scott Keller	
Container	Lukas Moodysson	Sweden	Drama	Jena Malone, Peter Lorentzon and Mariha Åberg	
Cruel and Unusual	Janet Baus, Dan Hunt and Reid Williams	United States	Documentary	focuses on five trans women, three incarcerated and two recently released from prison	
The Curiosity of Chance	Russell P. Marleau	Belgium; United States	Comedy	Tad Hilgenbrink and Brett Chukerman	
Dasepo Naughty Girls	E J-yong	South Korea	Animation, comedy	Kim Ok-vin (credited as Kim Ok-bin), Park Jin-woo, Lee Kyeon, Lee Eun-sung and Yoo Gun	a.k.a. Dasepo sonyo; based on the webtoon of the same name by B-rate Dalgung
Dirty Laundry	Maurice Jamal	United States	Comedy, drama	Rockmond Dunbar, Loretta Devine, Jenifer Lewis, Terri J. Vaughn, Maurice Jamal, Sommore, Joey Costello, Aaron Grady Shaw and Rainey Matthews	
East Side Story	Carlos Portugal	United States	Comedy	René Alvarado, Steve Callahan, Gladise Jimenez, David Berón, Irene DeBari, Yelyna De Leon and Luis Raúl	
Eating Out 2: Sloppy Seconds	Phillip J. Bartell	United States	Comedy, romance	Jim Verraros, Emily Brooke Hands, Rebekah Kochan, Brett Chukerman, Marco Dapper, Scott Vickaryous, Mink Stole, Adrián Quiñonez, Jessie Gold and Joseph Morales	
Eternal Summer	Leste Chen	Taiwan	Drama	Joseph Chang, Ray Young and Kate Yeung	a.k.a. Sheng xia guang nian
The Fall of '55	Seth Randal	United States	Documentary		Recounts the Boise homosexuality scandal
Les filles du botaniste	Sijie Dai	France; Canada	Drama, romance	Mylène Jampanoï, Li Xiaoran and Dongfu Lin	a.k.a. The Chinese Botanist's Daughters
Four Minutes	Chris Kraus	Germany	Drama	Monica Bleibtreu, Hannah Herzsprung, Sven Pippig and Richy Müller	a.k.a. Vier Minuten
Further Off the Straight and Narrow	Katherine Sender	United States	Documentary	Looks at LGBT people on TV	A sequel to Off the Straight and Narrow in 1998
A Girl Like Me: The Gwen Araujo Story	Agnieszka Holland	United States	Drama	J. D. Pardo, Mercedes Ruehl, Leela Savasta, Avan Jogia, Lupe Ontiveros, Henry Darrow and Corey Stoll	
Glue	Alexis Dos Santos	Argentina; United Kingdom	Drama	Nahuel Pérez Biscayart, Nahuel Viale and Inés Efron	a.k.a. Glue – Historia adolescente en medio de la nada
Gray Matters	Sue Kramer	United States	Romantic, comedy	Heather Graham, Bridget Moynahan, Tom Cavanagh, Molly Shannon, Rachel Shelley, Bill Mondy, Warren Christie, Alan Cumming and Sissy Spacek	
The Gymnast	Ned Farr	United States	Drama	Dreya Weber, Addie Yungmee, David De Simone, Allison Mackie and Mam Smith	
The History Boys	Nicholas Hytner	United Kingdom	Comedy, drama	Richard Griffiths, Clive Merrison, Frances de la Tour, Stephen Campbell Moore, Samuel Anderson, Samuel Barnett, Dominic Cooper, James Corden, Sacha Dhawan, Andrew Knott, Jamie Parker and Russell Tovey	Screenplay by Alan Bennett, based on play of the same name
The House of Adam	Jorge Ameer	United States	Drama, mystery, suspense	John Shaw, Jared Cadwell, Felipe Munoz, Alexis Karriker, Thomas Michael Kappler, Thomas Michael Kappier	
I Don't Want to Sleep Alone	Tsai Ming-liang	Malaysia; China; Taiwan; France; Austria	Comedy, drama	Lee Kang-sheng, Norman Atun and Chen Shiang-chyi	a.k.a. Hei yan quan
Keillers Park	Susanna Edwards	Sweden	Drama	Mårten Klingberg, Piotr Giro, Karin Bergquist, Gösta Bredefeldt	
Like a Virgin	Lee Hae-jun, Lee Hae-young	South Korea	Drama	Ryu Deok-hwan, Baek Yoon-sik and Lee Eon	a.k.a. Cheonhajangsa madonna
Little Miss Sunshine	Jonathan Dayton, Valerie Faris	United States	Comedy, drama	Greg Kinnear, Steve Carell, Toni Collette, Paul Dano, Abigail Breslin, Alan Arkin, Bryan Cranston and Dean Norris	
Love My Life	Kôji Kawano	Japan	Romance	Rei Yoshii, Asami Imajuku, Ira Ishida, Issey Takahashi, Kami Hiraiwa, Takamasa Suga, Chiharu Kawai, Ken Teraizumi, Naomi Akimoto, Hiroyuki Ikeuchi, Miyoko Asada and Kyōko Koizumi	
Love and Other Disasters	Alek Keshishian	France; United Kingdom	Comedy	Brittany Murphy, Matthew Rhys, Santiago Cabrera, Catherine Tate, Elliot Cowan, Adam Rayner, Jamie Sives and Will Keen	
Love Sick	Tudor Giurgiu	Romania; France	Drama	Maria Popistașu, Ioana Barbu, Tudor Chirila, Catalina Murgea, Mircea Diaconu, Virginia Mirea, Tora Vasilescu, Valentin Popescu, Mihai Dinvale, Carmen Tănase, Puya, Mihaela Rădulescu and Robert Paschall Jr.	a.k.a. Legaturi bolnavicioase
Loving Annabelle	Katherine Brooks	United States	Drama	Erin Kelly, Diane Gaidry, Gustine Fudickar, Laura Breckenridge, Michelle Horn, Ilene Graff, Markus Flanagan, Leslie Andrews, Kevin McCarthy and Wendy Schaal	
The Man of My Life	Zabou Breitman	France	Drama	Bernard Campan, Charles Berling and Léa Drucker	a.k.a. L'Homme de sa vie
Maple Palm	Ralph Torjan	United States	Comedy, drama	Deborah Stewart, Taymour Ghazi, Andrea Carvajal, Robert J. Feldman and Lynda Lefever	
Metrosexual (Gang chanee gap ee-aep)	Yongyooth Thongkongtoon	Thailand	Romance, comedy, drama	Thianchai Chaisawatdee, Meesuk Jaengmeesuk, Patcharasri Benjamas, Ornpreeya Hunsat, Pimolwan Suphayang, Kulnadda Pajchimsawat, Michael Shaowanasai, Dawido Dorigo, Yano Khasogi and Panisara Pimpru	
Mirrors (Miroirs d'été)	Étienne Desrosiers	Canada	Short drama	Xavier Dolan, Stéphane Demers	
The Night Listener	Patrick Stettner	United States	Mystery	Robin Williams, Toni Collette, Rory Culkin, Bobby Cannavale, Sandra Oh, Joe Morton, John Cullum, Lisa Emery, Becky Ann Baker, Rodrigo Lopresti, Guenia Lemos, Marcia Haufrecht, Nick Gregory and Ed Jewett	Co-written by Armistead Maupin, based on his novel of the same name, which he based on his interaction with Anthony Godby Johnson
Nina's Heavenly Delights	Pratibha Parmar	United Kingdom	Comedy	Shelley Conn, Laura Fraser, Art Malik, Ronny Jhutti, Veena Sood, Atta Yaqub, Zoe Henretty, Raji James, Elaine C. Smith, Rita Wolf, Kathleen McDermott, Kulvinder Ghir, Tariq Mullan and Francisco Bosch	
No Regret	Hee-il Leesong	South Korea	Drama	Lee Yeong-hoon, Kim Nam-gil, Kim Jung-hwa	a.k.a. Huhwihaji anha
Paper Dolls	Tomer Heymann	United States; Israel; Switzerland	Documentary	follows five Filipino transsexuals; Salvador "Sally" Camatoy, Francisco "Cheska" P. Ortiz Jr., Toran "Jan" Jacob Libas, Efrenito "Nits" Manalili, Jose "Neil" T. Datinguinoo, and others Chiqui Diokno, Giorgio Diokno, Eduardo "Rika" Javar, Chaim Amir and Noa Heymann	a.k.a. Bubot Niyar
The Pink Mirror	Sridhhar Rangayan	India	Short, Drama	Ramesh Menon, Edwin Fernandes, Rishi Raj and Rufy Baqal	40 mins long, aka Gulabi Aaina
Poltergay	Eric Lavaine	France	Comedy	Clovis Cornillac, Julie Depardieu, Lionel Abelanski, Michel Duchaussoy, Philippe Duquesne, Alain Fromager, Georges Gay, Gilles Gaston-Dreyfus, Jean-Michel Lahmi and Héctor Cabello Reyes	
Puccini for Beginners	Maria Maggenti	United States	Comedy, romance	Elizabeth Reaser, Gretchen Mol, Justin Kirk	
Quinceañera	Richard Glatzer, Wash Westmoreland	United States	Drama	Emily Rios, Jesse Garcia, Chalo González, J.R. Cruz, David W. Ross, Alicia Sixtos, Jesus Castaños-Chima, Jason L. Wood and Araceli Guzman-Rico	
Rag Tag	Adaora Nwandu	United Kingdom; Nigeria	Drama, romance	Daniel "Danny" Parsons, Adedamola "Damola" Adelaja, Tasmin Clarke, Geoffrey Aymer, Maria Adeioye, Enor Ewere, Chuma Oraedu, Ayo Fawole, Ikenna 'Macoy' Akwari, Rachael Young, Kristian Ademola, Olivette Cole-Wilson, Lamarr Nestor-Thelwell, Chanelle Wilshire, Amanda Van Annan and Gayle Dudley	
Rock Pockets	Trevor Anderson	Canada	Short documentary	Trevor Anderson, Nik Kozub	
Running with Scissors	Ryan Murphy	United States	Comedy, drama	Joseph Cross, Annette Bening, Brian Cox, Joseph Fiennes, Evan Rachel Wood, Alec Baldwin, Jill Clayburgh, Gwyneth Paltrow, Gabrielle Union, Patrick Wilson, Kristin Chenoweth, Dagmara Domińczyk and Colleen Camp	Based on the memoir of the same name by Augusten Burroughs, who makes an uncredited appearance as himself
The Saddest Boy in the World	Jamie Travis	Canada	Short, Black comedy	Benjamin Smith, Kirsten Robek, Babz Chula	
Scenes of a Sexual Nature	Ed Blum	United Kingdom	Comedy, drama	Adrian Lester, Ewan McGregor, Tom Hardy, Andrew Lincoln, Catherine Tate, Eileen Atkins, Gina McKee, Holly Aird, Hugh Bonneville, Sophie Okonedo	
Shock to the System	Ron Oliver	Canada	Crime, drama	Chad Allen, Sebastian Spence, Michael Woods, Daryl Shuttleworth, Morgan Fairchild, Anne Marie DeLuise, Rikki Gagne, Stephen Huszar, Nelson Wong, Ryan Kennedy, Jeffrey Bowyer-Chapman, Shawn Roberts, Gerry Morton, Morgan Brayton, Leanne Adachi, Jared Keeso, Shawn Reis, Robert Kaiser, Giles Panton, Levi James, Dany Papineau, Darrin Maharaj, Sibel Thrasher, Joshua Dave Tynchuh and Jon Johnson	
Shortbus	John Cameron Mitchell	United States	Drama	Sook-Yin Lee, Paul Dawson, Lindsay Beamish, PJ DeBoy	
A Soap	Pernille Fischer Christensen	Denmark	Comedy, drama	Trine Dyrholm, David Dencik, Frank Thiel and Elsebeth Steentoft	
Sons	Erik Richter Strand	Norway	Drama	Nils Jørgen Kallstad, Mikkel Bratt Silset, Edward Schultheiss, Henrik Mestad, Ingrid Bolsø Berdal, Anna Bache-Wiig, Ronnie Baraldsnes, Christin Borge, Terje Brevik, Fredrik Stenberg Ditlev-Simonsen, Marika Enstad, Henrik Fjelldal, Ane Hoel, Lars Erik Holter, Jeppe Beck Laursen, Fredrik Norrman and Joachim Rafaelsen	a.k.a. Sønner
Statross le Magnifique	Rémi Lange	France	Short	Jann Halexander, Pascale Ourbih, Antoine Parlebas and Illmann Bel	
Surrender, Dorothy	Charles McDougall	United States	Drama	Diane Keaton, Natalie Swerdlow, Tom Everett Scott, Alexa Davalos, Lauren German, Josh Hopkins, Chris Pine, Peter Riegert, Marnie Crossen, Myra McWethy, Roy Werner, Liam Lynch	
This Film Is Not Yet Rated	Kirby Dick	United Kingdom; United States	Documentary	People interviewed:David Ansen film critic, Darren Aronofsky filmmaker, Jamie Babbit filmmaker, Maria Bello actress, Paul Dergarabedian box office analyst (Media by Numbers), Atom Egoyan filmmaker, Mary Harron filmmaker, Wayne Kramer (filmmaker), Lawrence Lessig law professor, Jon Lewis film professor (Oregon State University), Kimberly Peirce filmmaker, Bingham Ray distributor and former President United Artists), Kevin Smith filmmaker, Matt Stone cartoonist and filmmaker, Michael Tucker (director) and John Waters (filmmaker)	About the Motion Picture Association of America film rating system
Three Summers	Carlos Augusto de Oliveira	Denmark	Short, comedy, drama	Morten Kirkskov, Simon Munk, Stine Schrøder Jensen, Carsten Bjørnlund, Birgitte Hjort Sørensen, Sarah Boberg	a.k.a. Tre somre
Times Have Been Better (Le ciel sur la tête)	Régis Musset	France	Comedy	Arnaud Binard, Bernard Le Coq, Charlotte de Turckheim	
Twilight Dancers	Mel Chionglo	Philippines	Drama	Tyron Perez, Allen Dizon, Lauren Novero, Cherry Pie Picache, Terence Baylon, Ana Capri, William Martinez, Joel Lamangan	
Vacationland	Todd Verow	United States	Drama	Brad Hallowell, Gregory J. Lucas, Hilary Mann, Jennifer Stackpole, Mindy Hofman, Charles Ard, Michael John Dion	
A Very Serious Person	Charles Busch	United States	Drama	Polly Bergen, Charles Busch, Dana Ivey, Julie Halston, Carl Andress, P.J. Verhoest, J. Smith-Cameron, Mick Hazen and Eric Nelsen	
When Darkness Falls	Anders Nilsson	Germany; Sweden	Drama	Oldoz Javidi, Lia Boysen, Reuben Sallmander, Per Graffman, Bahar Pars and Mina Azarian	a.k.a. När mörkret faller
Wild Tigers I Have Known	Cam Archer	United States	Drama	Malcolm Stumpf, Patrick White, Max Paradise, Fairuza Balk, Kim Dickens and Tom Gilroy	
The Yacoubian Building	Marwan Hamed	Egypt	Drama	Adel Emam, Nour El-Sherif, Yousra, Hend Sabri, Somaya El Khashab, Khaled El Sawy, Issad Younis, Ahmed Bedeir, Ahmed Rateb, Khaled Saleh, Bassem Samra, Mohamed Imam and Youssef Daoud	a.k.a. Omaret yakobean; based on the novel of the same name by Alaa Al Aswany
Zsa Zsa Zaturnnah, ze Moveeh	Joel Lamangan	Philippines	Comedy	Rustom Padilla, Zsa Zsa Padilla, Chokoleit, Alfred Vargas, Pops Fernandez, Pauleen Luna, Alwyn Uytingco, Kitkat, Say Alonzo, Giselle Sanchez, Glaiza de Castro, Joy Viado, Minnie Aguilar, Christian Vasquez and Jim Pebanco	
