= Rettenmund =

Rettenmund is an English surname. Notable people with the surname include:

- Matthew Rettenmund (born 1968), American editor and author
- Merv Rettenmund (1943–2024), American baseball player and coach
