= List of French film directors =

This is a list of French film directors.

== A–B ==
- Mona Achache
- Gabriel Aghion
- Alexandre Aja
- Jean-Gabriel Albicocco
- Marc Allégret
- Yves Allégret
- Jean-Baptiste Andrea
- Jean-Jacques Annaud
- Olivier Assayas
- Alexandre Astruc
- Jacques Audiard
- Jacqueline Audry
- Jean Aurel
- Claude Autant-Lara
- Serge Avedikian
- Gaël Aymon
- Géla Babluani
- Charles le Bargy
- Jacques de Baroncelli
- Jean-Marc Barr
- Jean-Louis Barrault
- Jacques Becker
- Jean Becker
- Jean-Jacques Beineix
- Yannick Bellon
- Yamina Benguigui
- Raymond Bernard
- Claude Berri
- Luc Besson
- Bruno Bianchi
- Enki Bilal
- Alice Guy-Blaché
- Michel Blanc
- Bertrand Blier
- Romane Bohringer
- Michel Boisrond
- Patrick Bokanowski
- Bertrand Bonello
- Bernie Bonvoisin
- Rachid Bouchareb
- Martin Bourboulon
- Laurent Boutonnat
- Jean-Christophe Bouvet
- Sarah Bouyain
- Jean-Pierre Bouyxou
- Jean Boyer
- Gérard Brach
- Catherine Breillat
- Robert Bresson
- Jean-Claude Brialy
- Philippe de Broca
- Charles Burguet
- Alexandre Bustillo
- José Bénazéraf

== C–E ==
- Marcel Camus
- Guillaume Canet
- Laurent Cantet
- Leos Carax
- Christian Carion
- Marcel Carné
- Marc Caro
- Emmanuel Carrère
- Yves Caumon
- André Cayatte
- Alain Chabat
- Claude Chabrol
- Jacques Charon
- Étienne Chatiliez
- Patrice Chéreau
- Antoine Chevrollier
- Segundo de Chomón
- Élie Chouraqui
- Christian-Jaque
- Yves Ciampi
- Jean-Paul Civeyrac
- René Clair
- René Clément
- Henri-Georges Clouzot
- Jean Cocteau
- Clément Cogitore
- Romain Cogitore
- Henri Colpi
- Alain Corneau
- Catherine Corsini
- Edgardo Cozarinsky
- Pierre Creton
- Guy Debord
- Camille Delamarre
- Jean Delannoy
- Benoît Delépine
- Denis Delestrac
- Louis Delluc
- Richard Dembo
- Jacques Demy
- Claire Denis
- Jacques Deray
- Arnaud Desplechin
- Michel Deville
- Henri Diamant-Berger
- William Kennedy Dickson
- Albert Dieudonné
- Vincent Dieutre
- Arielle Dombasle
- Germaine Dulac
- Bruno Dumont
- François Dupeyron
- Marguerite Duras
- Julien Duvivier
- Christine Edzard
- Robert Enrico
- Jean Epstein
- Jean Eustache

== F–J ==
- Henri de la Falaise
- Ismaël Ferroukhi
- Louis Feuillade
- Jacques Feyder
- Vanessa Filho
- Georges Franju
- Guy du Fresnay
- Abel Gance
- Christophe Gans
- Nicole Garcia
- Philippe Garrel
- Louis J. Gasnier
- Tony Gatlif
- Costa Gavras
- Julie Gavras
- Daniel Gélin
- Xavier Gens
- Bernard Giraudeau
- Francis Girod
- Jean-Luc Godard
- Michel Gondry
- Yann Gonzalez
- Jean-Pierre Gorin
- Jean-Paul Goude
- Pierre Granier-Deferre
- Jean Grémillon
- Paul Grimault
- Stéphan Guérin-Tillié
- Sacha Guitry
- Paul Gury
- Alice Guy-Blaché
- Lucile Hadžihalilović
- Roger Hanin
- Mia Hansen-Løve
- Philippe Harel
- Christophe Honoré
- Robert Hossein
- André Hugon
- André Hunebelle
- Marcel Ichac
- Jean Image
- Otar Iosseliani
- Aline Issermann
- Luc Jacquet
- Benoît Jacquot
- Just Jaeckin
- Agnès Jaoui
- Sébastien Japrisot
- Jean-Christophe Jeauffre
- Jean-Pierre Jeunet
- Roland Joffé

== K–M ==
- William Karel
- Mathieu Kassovitz
- Peter Kassovitz
- Cédric Klapisch
- Nicolas Klotz
- Gérard Krawczyk
- Diane Kurys
- Adonis Kyrou
- Marcel L'Herbier
- Nans Laborde-Jourdàa
- George Lacombe
- Jean-Daniel Lafond
- René Laloux
- Albert Lamorisse
- Hélène Lam Trong
- Rémi Lange
- Alexis Langlois
- Claude Lanzmann
- Jacques Lanzmann
- Denys de La Patellière
- Pascal Laugier
- Georges Lautner
- Yves Lavandier
- Louis Le Prince
- Patrice Leconte
- Claude Lelouch
- René Leprince
- Louis Leterrier
- Sébastien Lifshitz
- Auguste and Louis Lumière
- Teddy Lussi-Modeste
- Sarah Maldoror
- Louis Malle
- Sophie Marceau
- Ali Marhyar
- Maurice Mariaud
- Chris Marker
- Sébastien Marnier
- Jean-Pierre Marois
- Christian Marquand
- Tonie Marshall
- Léon Mathot
- Julien Maury
- Nicolas Maury
- Georges Méliès
- Jean-Pierre Melville
- Michel Mitrani
- Radu Mihăileanu
- Soraya Milla
- Claude Miller
- Alexandre Michon
- Noël Mitrani
- Serge Moati
- Jean-Pierre Mocky
- Léonide Moguy
- Édouard Molinaro
- Gregory Monro
- Bruno Monsaingeon
- Gaël Morel
- Luc Moullet
- Mr. Oizo
- Musidora

== N–R ==
- Raphael Nadjari
- Jules and Gedeon Naudet
- Gaspar Noé
- Bruno Nuytten
- Marcel Ophüls
- Gérard Oury
- François Ozon
- Marcel Pagnol
- Jean Painlevé
- Euzhan Palcy
- Jean-Marie Pallardy
- Philippe Parreno
- Christine Pascal
- Alain Payet
- Max Pécas
- Robert Péguy
- Vincent Pérez
- Léonce Perret
- Jacques Perrin
- Maurice Pialat
- Claude Pinoteau
- Gérard Pirès
- Pitof
- Caroline Poggi
- Jean-Marie Poiré
- Léon Poirier
- Roman Polanski
- Jean-Daniel Pollet
- Henri Pouctal
- Eugene Py
- Philippe Ramos
- Alex Ranarivelo
- Bernard Rapp
- Jean-Paul Rappeneau
- Jean Renoir
- Alain Resnais
- Jacques Rivette
- Alain Robbe-Grillet
- Yves Robert
- Éric Rochant
- Charles de Rochefort
- Éric Rohmer
- Jean Rollin
- Frédéric Rossif
- François Rotger
- Brigitte Roüan
- Gaston Roudès
- Jacques Rouffio
- Henry Roussell
- Jacques Rozier
- Alexandre Ryder

== S–Z ==
- Jean-Paul Salomé
- Lucia Sanchez
- Claude Sautet
- Suzanne Schiffman
- Pierre Schoendoerffer
- Barbet Schroeder
- Céline Sciamma
- Partho Sen-Gupta
- Serge Ankri
- Coline Serreau
- Marius Sestier
- Delphine Seyrig
- Florent Emilio Siri
- Ramzi Ben Sliman
- George Sluizer
- Nicole Stéphane
- Straub-Huillet
- Ramata-Toulaye Sy
- Charlotte Szlovak
- Jeannot Szwarc
- Jihan El-Tahri
- Jacques Tati
- Bertrand Tavernier
- André Téchiné
- Virginie Thévenet
- Danièle Thompson
- Daniel Tinayre
- Laurent Tirard
- Jacques Tourneur
- Maurice Tourneur
- Tran Anh Hung
- Coralie Trinh Thi
- Nadine Trintignant
- François Truffaut
- Roger Vadim
- Eric Valli
- Charles Vanel
- Agnès Varda
- Marcel Varnel
- Flore Vasseur
- Anton Vassil
- Francis Veber
- Paul Vecchiali
- Henri Verneuil
- Sandrine Veysset
- Jean Vigo
- René Viénet
- Jonathan Vinel
- Régis Wargnier
- Alexis Wajsbrot
- André Weinfeld
- Sylvain White
- Anne Wiazemsky
- Ferdinand Zecca
- Ariel Zeitoun
- Claude Zidi
- Rebecca Zlotowski
- Erick Zonca

== See also ==
- Cinema of France
- List of French people
