= Maidy Teitelbaum =

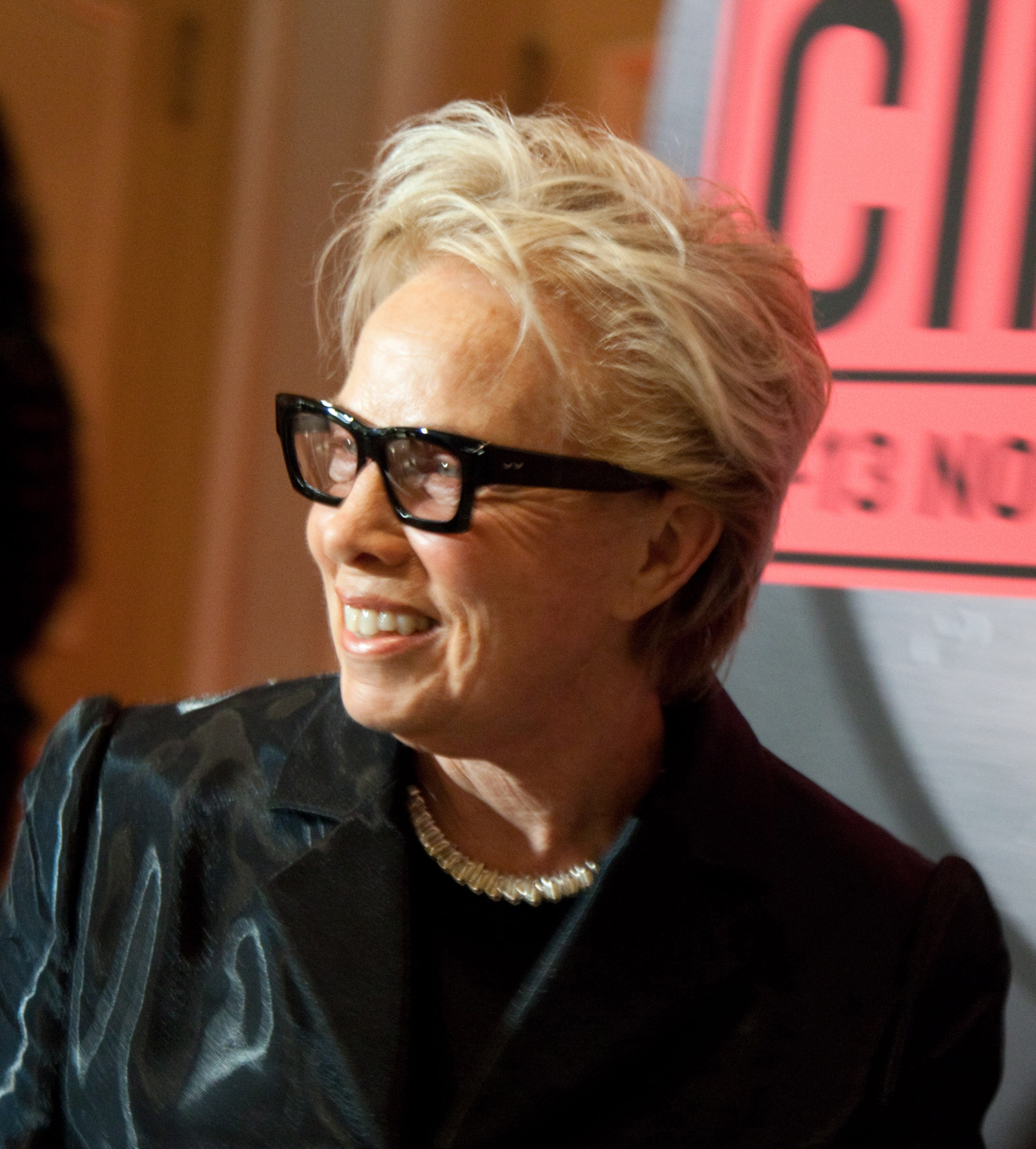
- Teitelbaum in 2016
- Born: Montreal, Quebec, Canada
- Occupations: Film festival founder, arts advocate
- Known for: Founder of Cinemania Film Festival
- Awards: Ordre des Arts et des Lettres – Chevalier (2006), Officier (2017); Médaille Beaumarchais (2008)

Maidy Teitelbaum is the founder of Cinemania Film Festival in Montréal, Québec (Canada).

Passionate about cinema, she was inspired to launch CINEMANIA after attending the weeklong Sarasota French Film Festival in 1994. One year later, she created the Cinemania Film Festival with support from the private sector. The first edition consists of 5 days of screenings at the Montréal Museum of Fine Arts.

In November 2006, 11 years after its creation, attendance of CINEMANIA increased, and the Festival changed venues to the Imperial Cinema in Montréal's Quartier des Spectacles.

In its 20th anniversary year (2014), CINEMANIA launches several new projects. The festival strengthens its unique and ongoing relationship between French-speaking filmmakers and Quebec distributors, makes the diversity of French-language cinema accessible to young people through a programme of school screenings and expands its free summer programming of films in a few Montreal parks.

Famous Canadian journalist and producer Kevin Tierney declared that Teitelbaum has created a real success story while smartly preparing the future: "She has established an organization that has new blood, new leadership in the form of managing director Guilhem Caillard." Along with Founder Teitelbaum, French film critic Guilhem Caillard, who came on board in 2011, has taken the festival "to unprecedented heights of renown." And according to him, CINEMANIA is "answering a deep need in the community, here in Montreal, and in la francophonie, for these films which talk about the world of today differently."

In November 2019, the event celebrates its 25th anniversary with brio, recording the highest number of participants in its history with 28 000 spectators and once again reaffirms its commitment to the Francophonie. The French feature films such as Céline Sciamma's PORTRAIT OF A LADY ON FIRE and Québec's Sophie Deraspe's ANTIGONE represent their respective countries in the race for the 2020 Oscars, further enhancing the selection. Facing the increasing success of the Festival, Maidy Teitelbaum declares: "I don't know where the time went. Every year, we just put on our boxing gloves and said, ‘Go out there and fight for the films, the guests and the venues.’ "

After 25 years of strong commitment, Maidy Teitelbaum definitely leaves the organization in January 2020. Guilhem Caillard stays on board as the Festival director.

== Ordre des Arts et des Lettres de la République française ==
In 2006, Teitelbaum was made a Chevalier de l'Ordre des Arts et des Lettres of France in recognition of her contribution to French culture.

In 2017, she was awarded the distinction of Officier de l’Ordre des Arts et des Lettres de la République Française. The ceremony was presided over by Mme Laurence Haguenauer, consule générale de France à Québec, in the presence of many of Montréal's cultural personalities as well as Festival collaborators and partners.

== Médaille Beaumarchais ==
On June 16, 2008, Teitelbaum received the Médaille Beaumarchais awarded by the SACD of France (Société des Auteurs et Compositeurs Dramatiques). This medal is awarded each year to those whose work supports artistic creation and copyright issues.

The filmmaker Bertrand Tavernier, attended Cinemania in 2007. Jacques Fansten, President of the SACD, said: "thanks to Bertrand Tavernier, we know all about the remarkable work you have achieved through the creation of this festival (...). We also know that you have managed to touch a very wide audience and this is a beautiful gift to our films."

== See also ==
- List of French films
- List of French actors
- List of French directors
- List of French language films
- Culture of France
- Cinema of Quebec
