= Cinemania (film festival) =

Canadian film festival in Montreal

CINEMANIA Film Festival (Festival de films CINEMANIA)
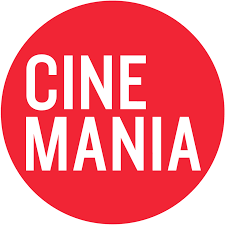
- Location: Montreal, Quebec, Canada
- Founded: 1995; 31 years ago
- Founded by: Maidy Teitelbaum
- Most recent: 31st edition, November 2025
- Directors: Guilhem Caillard
- Language: International

CINEMANIA Film Festival is a French-language film festival with English subtitles that takes place in Montreal. It is the most important event fully dedicated to francophone cinema in North-America.

In addition to film screenings, the CINEMANIA Festival also organizes a range of public events and audience engagement activities each year. These include masterclasses, conferences, special events, and cultural mediation sessions, designed to encourage dialogue between artists, industry professionals, and audiences, and to deepen the understanding of the works presented.

== Festival ==
The CINEMANIA French Film Festival in Montreal was established in 1995 and has continued annually ever since. The festival is dedicated solely to quality French-language feature films emanating from France, Belgium, Switzerland, Quebec, Algeria, Morocco, Senegal, and other French-speaking regions.

The event takes place every November during a period of 12 days. All films are screened in the Cineplex Quartier Latin, Monument-National, Cinéma du Parc, Cinéma du Musée and Cinémathèque québécoise in downtown Montreal.

== History ==
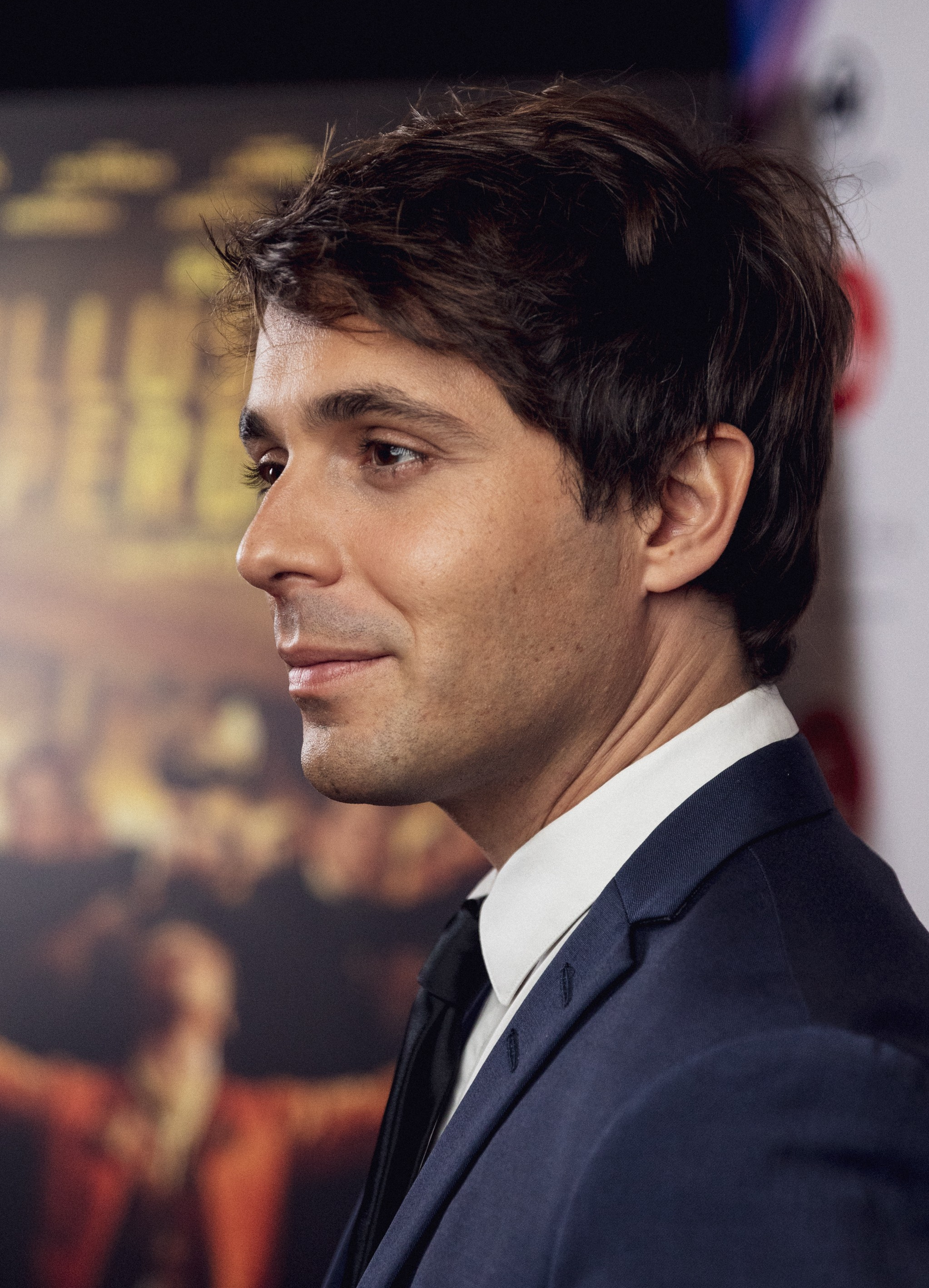
Guilhem Caillard, managing and artistic director of CINEMANIA

The festival was founded by Maidy Teitelbaum who was the ongoing president until January 2020 when she definitively left the organization after 26 years of commitment. The festival's first 10 years were at the Montreal Museum of Fine Arts, but in 2004 the event moved to the greater capacity Imperial Cinema. In 2006, Teitelbaum was awarded the Chevalier dans l'ordre des Arts et des Lettres by the French government for her work in fostering French culture. In addition, in 2008 the SACD decorated Teitelbaum with the Médaille Beaumarchais awarded each year since 1 777 to the persons who best exemplify efforts to protect the rights of artists, composers and writers. In 2017, Maidy was awarded the distinction of Officier de l'Ordre des Arts et des Lettres de la République Française.

As young French film critic Guilhem Caillard joined the team in March 2011, CINEMANIA began a collaboration with the Cinémathèque Québécoise, which allows, each year, to welcome a greater number of prestigious guests. This additional location enables the festival to organize retrospectives. According to T'Cha Dunlevy (The Gazette), "Festival director Guilhem has taken Cinemania to unprecedented heights of renown." "We’re answering a deep need in the community, here in Montreal, and in la francophonie, for these films which talk about the world of today differently,” Caillard said.

Journalist Dunlevy adds: "Not only does Cinemania get local premières of the big movies before they hit theatres — where they're not always screened with subtitles — but the festival has become a place to catch many independent French-language films that wouldn't otherwise make it to the big screen here." Renowned actors and actresses, such as Soko and Virginie Efira, attend the event every year.

In 2019, CINEMANIA celebrates its 25th anniversary with brio, recording the highest number of participants in its history with 28 000 spectators and once again reaffirms its commitment to the Francophonie. The French feature films such as Céline Sciamma’s Portrait of A Lady on Fire and Québec's Sophie Deraspe’s Antigone represent their respective countries in the race for the 2020 Oscars, further enhancing the selection.

In light of the COVID-19 pandemic, CINEMANIA initiates a major digital shift by developing an online streaming platform for most of its programming. For the first time, viewers from ocean to ocean in Canada are able to watch films from the Festival's selection from the comfort of their living room. The event runs for three weeks more than 80 virtual screenings, including many highlights of major film fests, from the Festival de Cannes on down. In 2020, and for the first time, CINEMANIA creates an important tribute to a Quebec film director, Louis Bélanger. This famous filmmaker is also the subject of a documentary portrait, produced and directed by CINEMANIA, while Bélanger receives the distinction of Chevalier dans l’Ordre des Arts et des Lettres de la République française from Consul General Frédéric Sanchez. This same year, as the event celebrates its 26th edition, Guilhem Caillard announces that CINEMANIA "opens a new chapter in its history by offering 34 short films, an original selection with an emphasis on creativity and diversity. For the very first time, the Festival is launching a short-film competition with a specialized jury. The Nespresso-AQCC Jury Prize has been created for this purpose. Further, our association with the Saguenay International Short Film Festival, whose 24th edition was abruptly interrupted by the quarantine, is indicative of the strong ties we maintain with our colleagues." As the Organisation Internationale de la Francophonie (OIF) celebrates its 50th anniversary, the film selection takes another step toward a greater Francophonie, vibrant and creative, with new feature films from the Ivory-Coast, Morocco, France, Luxembourg, Rwanda and Belgium.

== Program ==
CINEMANIA is the only francophone film festival dedicated to presenting quality French-language feature films subtitled in English. For many of the films screened, the festival is the only avenue of distribution. As a result, it is considered by many artists, journalists and cinephiles as a unique portal to view French-language films.

CINEMANIA shows approximately 120 feature films, each film screening twice.The focus is both on established filmmakers and first-time directors, providing a launching pad for up-and-coming talent. Well-known directors whose work appears frequently on CINEMANIA's screen include André Téchiné, Anne Fontaine, François Ozon, Maïwenn, Robert Guédiguian, Manuel Poirier, Aki Kauresmaki, and the Dardennes Bros. There have been guest appearances by such notable filmmakers as Bertrand Tavernier, Arnaud Desplechin, Olivier Assayas, Cédric Klapisch, Nicole Garcia, Alexandre Arcady, Costa-Gavras, Jean-Jacques Beinix, Patrice Leconte, and Radu Mihaileanu.

CINEMANIA guest stars have included Juliette Binoche, Anne Dorval, Romain Duris, Jonathan Cohen, Monia Chokri, Michel Hazanavicius, Emmanuelle Béart, Isabelle Huppert, Virginie Efira, Lambert Wilson, Laurent Lafitte and Soko, among others.

== Highlights of recent editions ==
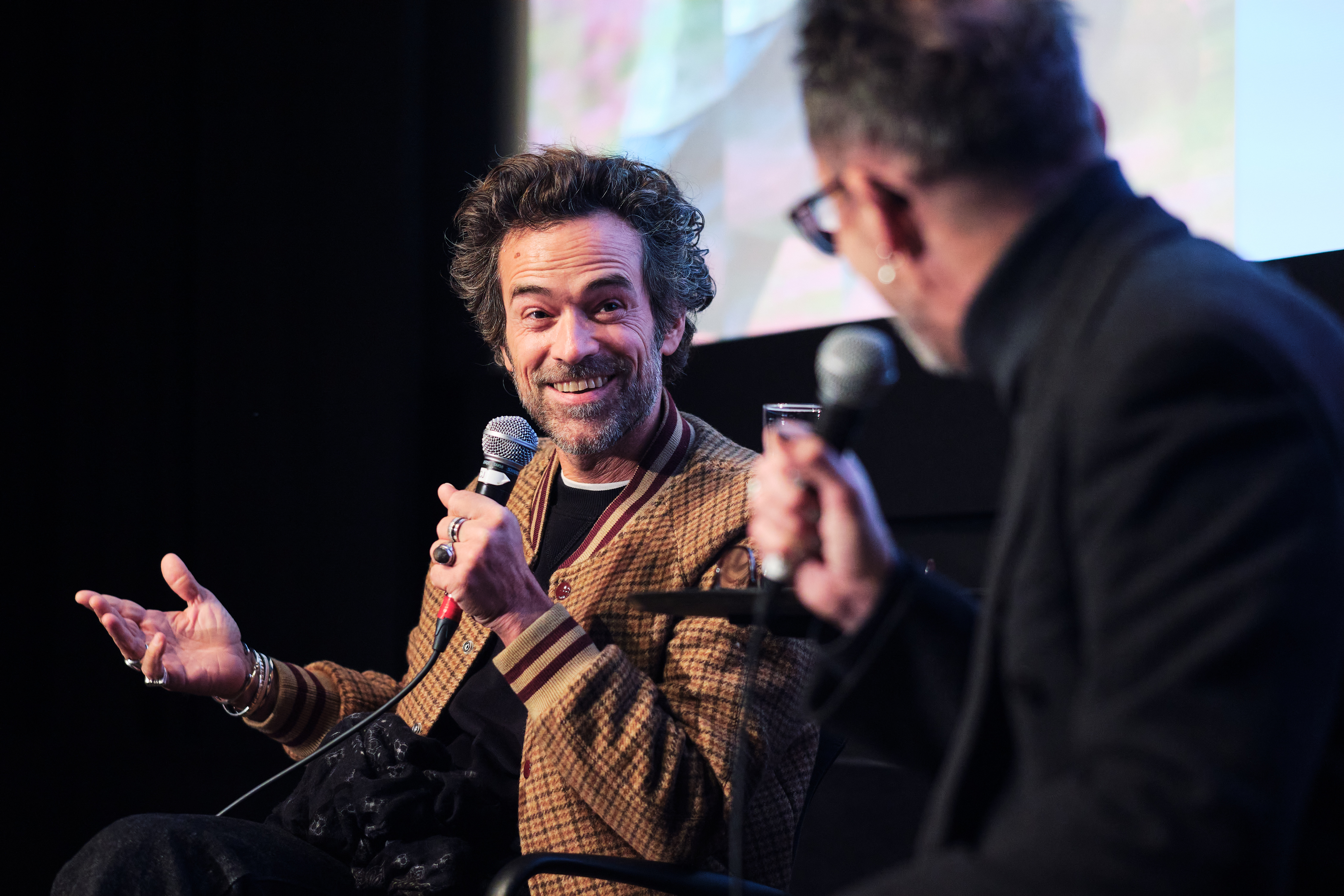
French actor Romain Duris at CINEMANIA (2024)

=== 2024 ===
The 30th anniversary edition of the CINEMANIA Festival took place from 6 to 17 November 2024. The festival recorded its highest attendance to date, with an increase of nearly 30% compared to 2023.

The programme featured 125 films across 162 screenings and welcomed more than 150 international guests, including Tahar Rahim, Grand Corps Malade, Sophie Deraspe, Romain Duris, Julie Gayet, Ken Scott, Charlotte Le Bon, Pier-Luc Funk and Béatrice Dalle.

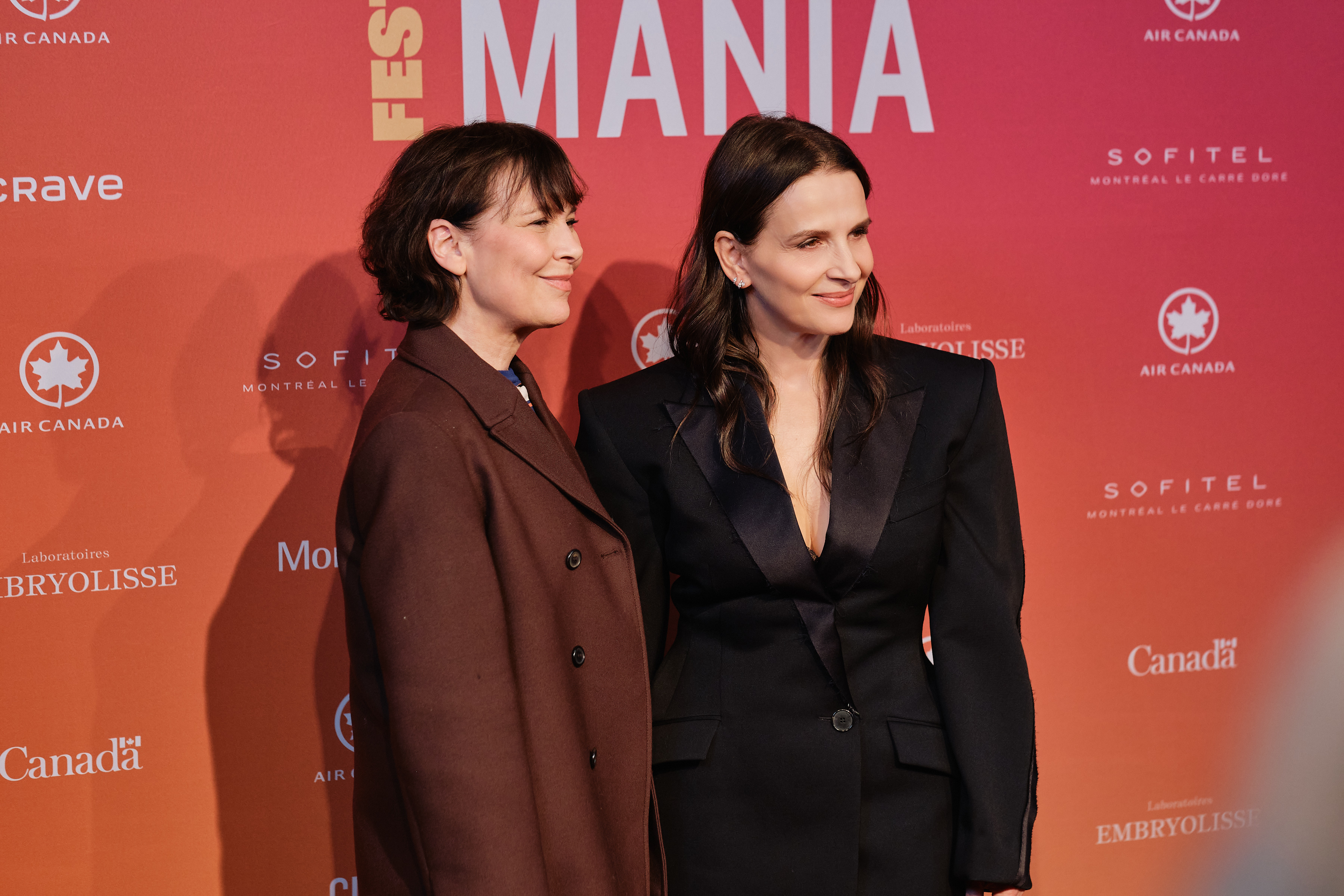
Juliette Binoche and Anne Dorval at the Opening Ceremony of CINEMANIA Film Festival (2025)

=== 2025 ===
The 31st edition of the CINEMANIA Festival was held in Montreal from 4 to 16 November 2025 and marked a new stage in the festival’s development. For the first time, the event extended over 13 days and presented more than 200 screenings, showcasing 170 films.

The edition welcomed over 250 guests from the Francophone film industry, including Juliette Binoche, Anne Dorval, Jérôme Commandeur, Jonathan Cohen, Niels Schneider, Laura Felpin, Thomas Ngijol and Monia Chokri.

The international competition Visages de la Francophonie jury was co-chaired by Anne Dorval and Niels Schneider. During the same edition, the CINEMANIA Honorary Award was presented to Monia Chokri, in recognition of her career and contribution to Francophone cinema.

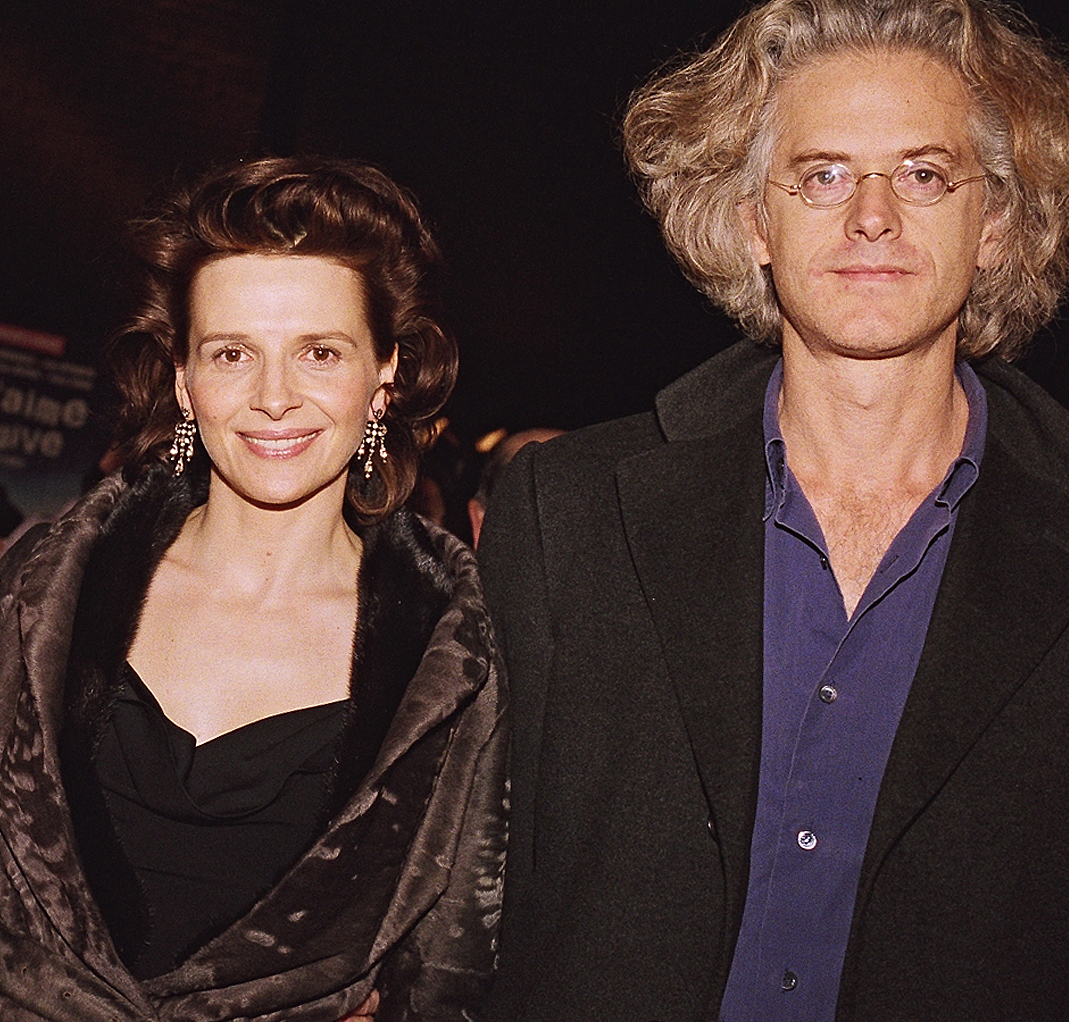
Juliette Binoche at CINEMANIA (2006)

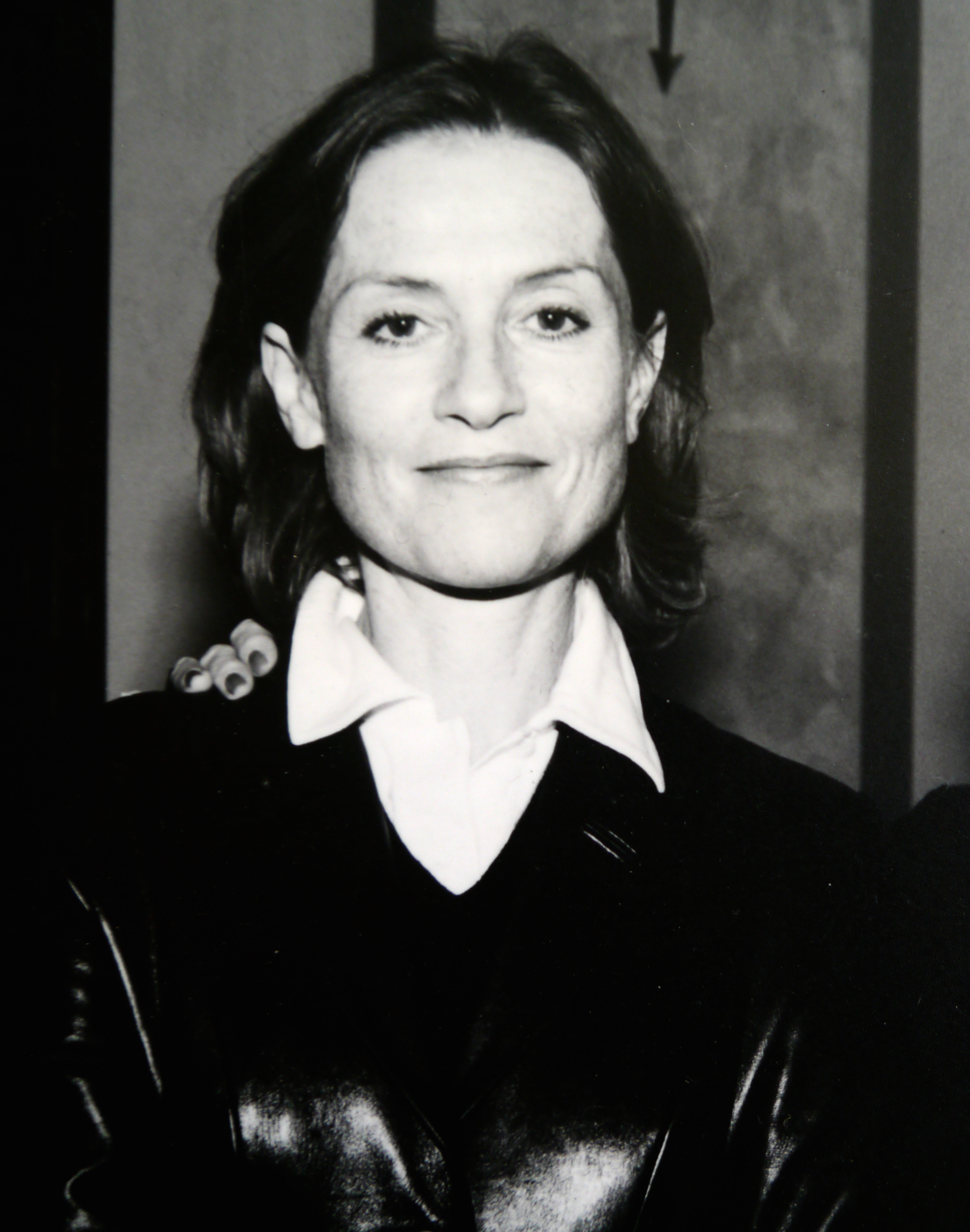
Isabelle Huppert, guest at CINEMANIA in 1998 and 2010.

== Public ==
CINEMANIA's loyal public keeps growing year after year. After 11 years at the Montreal Museum of Fine Arts, CINEMANIA moved to the Imperial Cinema to increase its capacity and thus respond to cinephiles' ever growing interest in the festival. The 12th edition saw its attendance increase by 50%, and the 13th edition in 2007 continued this growth. Those successive increases did not diminish the "cine-club" atmosphere of the festival, which is characterized by the interaction of film lovers and artists.

In 2020, as CINEMANIA went online due to the COVID-19 pandemic, the box-office resultats were surprisingly very impressive: the event reached out close to 30 000 spectators everywhere in Canada. Managing Director Guilhem Caillard declared: "One thing is certain, the results of this 26th online edition of CINEMANIA have far exceeded all our expectations. We are stunned by the number of viewers who participated in this edition. For the first time, our festival went out to meet viewers in the privacy of their homes, in the four corners of the province of Quebec and far beyond. CINEMANIA now has new fans in the rest of Canada. This is, I believe, what we must remember about the complex situation we are all facing: the health crisis has exacerbated the need for culture, entertainment, the appetite for a different kind of cinema, the need to discover and defend French-language films."

== Related activities ==
CINEMANIA organizes quality events that challenge and stimulate many cinephiles: master classes, discussion panels, presentation of films by their directors and actors, question and answer sessions after the projections.

== See also ==
- List of French films
- List of French actors
- List of French directors
- List of French-language films
- Culture of France
- Cinema of Quebec
