= Batsheva Dance Company =

Dance company based in Tel Aviv, Israel

General information
- Name: Batsheva Dance Company
- Year founded: 1964
- Founder: Batsheva de Rothschild
- Principal venue: Suzanne Dellal Centre for Dance and Theatre
- Website: batsheva.co.il/en/

The Batsheva Dance Company (Hebrew: להקת בת שבע) is a renowned dance company based in Tel Aviv, Israel. It was founded by Martha Graham and Baroness Batsheva de Rothschild in 1964.

Its inception was inspired by Israel's growing interest in American modern dance, mainly Martha Graham and Anna Sokolow. Classes in Graham technique were offered at the time, some taught by Rina Schenfeld and Rena Gluck, who were the company's principal dancers for many years. Bethsabee de Rothschild withdrew her funding in 1975, and the company gradually shed the Graham aesthetic that had dominated its early years. During this transitional period, the company began including the works of emerging Israeli choreographers into its repertory.

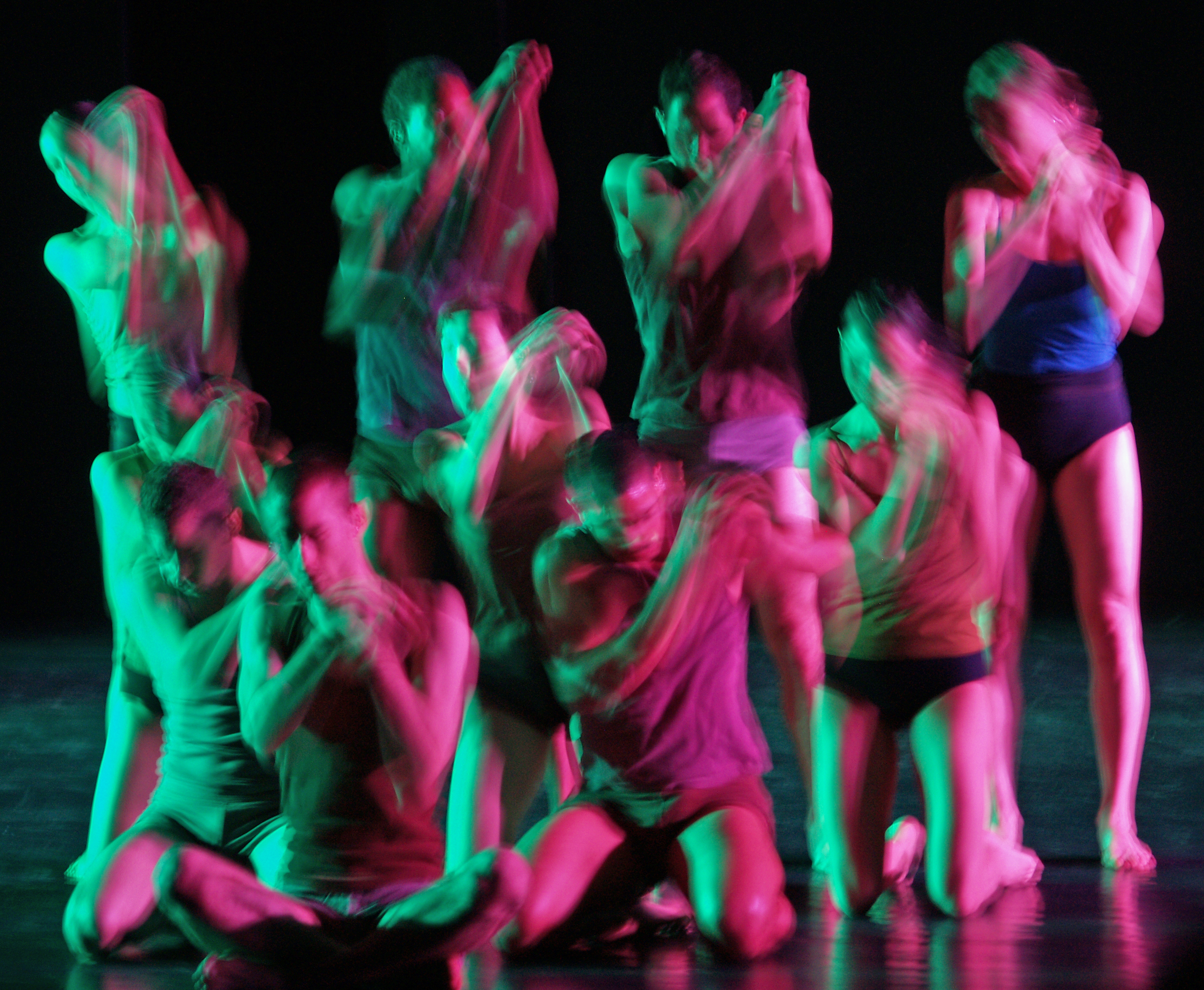
Batsheva Dance Company, 2007

Soon after Ohad Naharin was appointed artistic director in 1990, he founded the youth company Batsheva Ensemble, for dancers from 18 and 24. Its graduates include choreographers Hofesh Shechter and Itzik Galili. The ensemble toured the United Kingdom and performed at the Edinburgh International Festival in 2012.

Naharin also developed a movement language known as Gaga (dance vocabulary). This has become the movement language that Batsheva Dance Company trains in under the Gaga/Dancers track, which is geared towards professional dancers and specifically the dancers of Batsheva. There is also a track called Gaga/People, which is geared towards anyone and requires no dance experience. This movement language has been so influential in the modern dance world that, in 2015, a documentary entitled Mr. Gaga was created by Tomer Heymann. This documentary explores the ways in which Gaga, as a movement language, has shaped both Batsheva Dance Company and modern dance as a whole and the influence Naharin and his movement have had on the dance world.

== History ==
=== Early years (1964–1974) ===
Baroness Bethsabee de Rothschild, a patron of Martha Graham, wanted to create a foundation for Modern Dance in Israel, where she resided. Thus, she brought Martha Graham to Israel to aid in the development of performing arts there. On 24 December 1964, the company was officially founded. Graham remained active as Artistic Advisor in the formative years of the company, with the financial backing of the Baroness. The dancers trained in Graham technique and were the first outside the Graham company to perform her work. Martha Graham brought seven pieces to Batsheva, in addition to choreographing a piece exclusively for the company. Many critics, however, said the performance of these Graham works by Batsheva dancers had a very different energy and quality than the Graham dancers in America. The Israeli culture allowed for a different embodiment of the choreography and many responded well to it, even though some critics made mention of "faulty technique". But this well received new energy and youthfulness of the Batsheva dancers outweighed their lack of proper technique, and the women in the company were the first to have the opportunity to perform roles that Graham had created for herself; this did not go over very well with Graham's American dancers. This created quite a rift, and competition between the Graham dancers in New York and the Batsheva dancers in Israel.

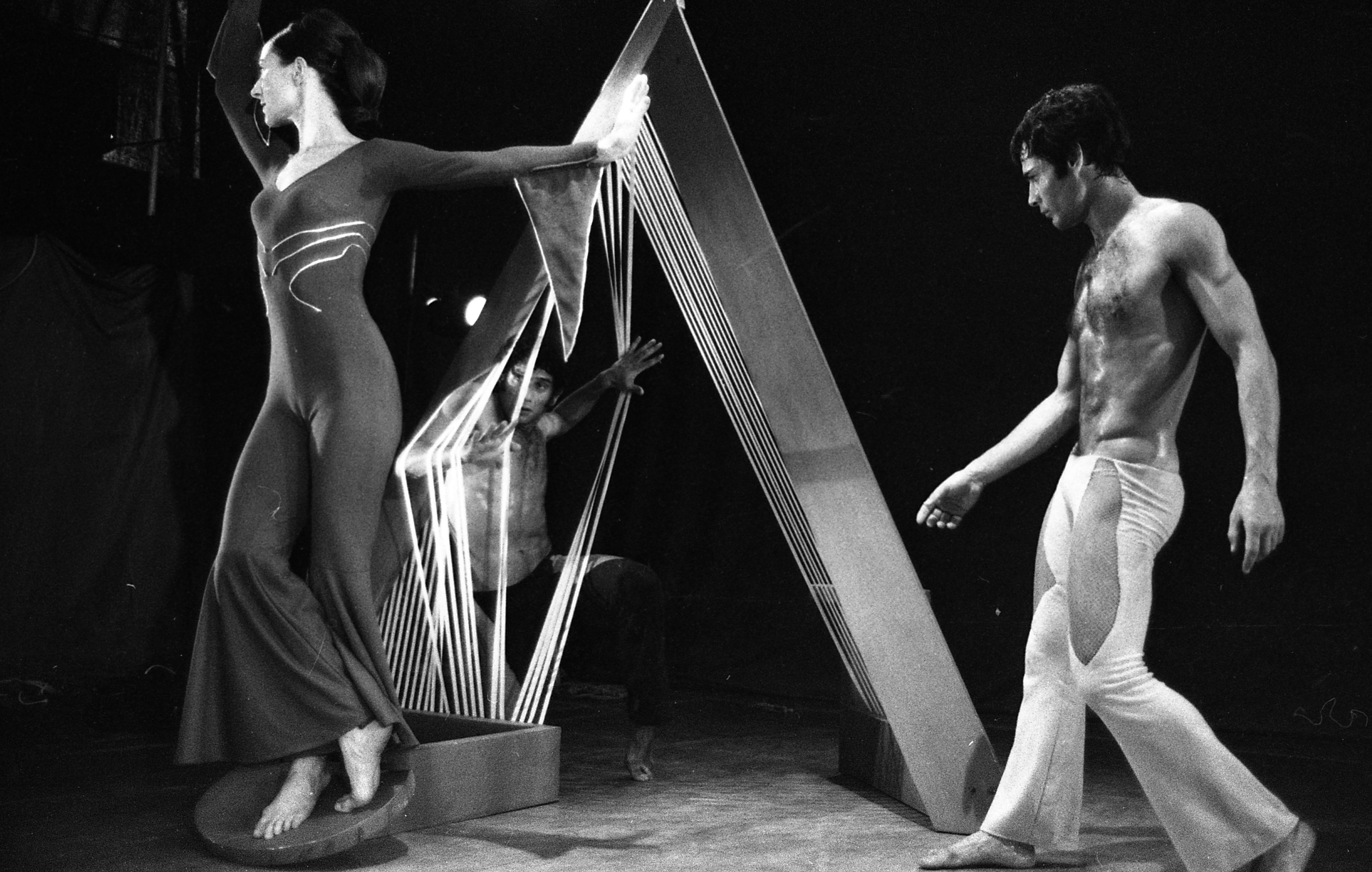
Batsheva Dance Company, 1969

Expression through movement was something that Graham looked for in auditions, rather than technical capability, which led to a range of facilities, but a cohesive ability to be expressive. Another fundamental principle implemented by Graham on the Batsheva dancers – which was different from traditional ballet – was the opportunity for collaboration between choreographer and dancer, and the opportunity for improvisation within set material. These fundamentals remain present in Batsheva works. Due to the company's close relationship with Martha Graham, many other well-renowned choreographers set work on Batsheva, such as Jose Limon, Glen Tetley, Jerome Robbins, and others.

In 1974 Baroness de Rothschild appointed Jeannette Ordman as artistic director. The company, however was unhappy with her decision. According to company members, Ordman's leadership style was problematic and they voiced their complaints to Graham, and Rothschild withdrew financial support from the company. She subsequently ended the company's relationship with Graham, which in turn meant they were unable to continue performing her work. Rothschild put her financial support into a new Modern dance company, Bat-Dor Dance Company, with Ordman as artistic director.

=== 1975–1990 ===
Without the financial support of Rothschild, the company could no longer afford to outsource foreign choreographers. Thus began an era of Israeli artistic directors and choreographers. According to many critics, the company maintained their strength technically and performatively, but lacked any choreographic innovation.

=== 1990–2018 ===
In 1990, Ohad Naharin was appointed artistic director of the company. One of the first things Naharin did as director was request higher pay for the dancers and make their workdays much longer. Naharin had been studying with Graham in New York and had previously presented choreographic works in New York as well as in Tel Aviv. In this new decade of Batsheva, Naharin built a younger audience by bringing in newer choreographers from around the world, but also many from Israel. Along with the refreshed choreography, Naharin developed his own movement language, "Gaga". This new movement boomed and has become well known worldwide, making Batsheva the leader of the Gaga style and renowned internationally.

=== 2018–present ===
In September 2018, Ohad Naharin stepped down from his position as the company's artistic director. The position was taken by Gili Navot, a former Batsheva dancer and rehearsal director, while Naharin continued to hold the role of house choreographer. In December 2019, the company premiered a piece titled 2019, which was described by The Jerusalem Post as a tight group of fine dancers who shine with singularity, and a choreography that seems to offer a fresh outlook on the components of its performance. The piece included music tracks in Hebrew, Arabic, and Japanese.

Amid the 2023 Gaza war, the company released a statement calling for an immediate ceasefire in Gaza and a hostage deal.

== Selected performances ==
- Mamootot (2003)
- Kamuyot (2003)
- Seder (2007)
- Makarova Kabisa (2008)
- BILL (2010)
- The Hole (2013)
- Last Work (2015)
- Venezuela (2017)
- The Look (2019)
- 2019 (2019)
- MOMO (2022)
- Anafaza (2024 revival)

== See also ==
- Dance in Israel
- Culture of Israel
- Piotr Giro
