= Amir Barghashi =

Swedish actor and dramatist

Amir Barghashi (born 15 June 1951) is a Swedish actor and dramatist.

Barghashi was born in Iran, where he received his education. In Sweden, he has worked at Uppsala City Theatre and participated in Pingst by David Edgar. He has also participated in Josef och hans bröder at the Orion Theatre. He has participated in Guantanamo and Paradis is at Stockholm City Theatre. He wrote the manuscript of Paradis is. He has also been screenwriter of Kyss mina skor, which had premiere at Uppsala City Theatre 2001.

== Filmography ==
- 2011 - Circumstance
- 2007–08 – Andra Avenyn
- 2003 – Talismanen
- Bäst i Sverige! (2002)
- 2002 – Tusenbröder
- Mellan himmel och hästben (2001)
- Beck – Mannen utan ansikte (2001)
- 1998 – Tre kronor
- Under mitt eget tak (1997)
