= Malin Birgerson =

Swedish actress

- Born: Malin Susanna Margareta Birgerson; 28 January 1968 (age 58); Täby, Sweden
- Occupation: Actress
- Spouse: Sven Irving

Malin Susanna Margareta Birgerson (born 28 January 1968 in Täby, Stockholm County, Sweden) is a Swedish actress.

Birgerson studied from 1992–95 at the NAMA in Malmö. After that she acted in different Swedish theatres including the Stockholm City Theatre in 1997. Birgerson became popular as the police inspector Alice Levander in Season 2 of the Beck-films. Since February 2007, she has worked in the Swedish Theatre Federation. Birgerson is married to journalist Sven Irving from TV4.

== Filmography ==
- Soldater i månsken (2000)
- Beck – Mannen utan ansikte (2001)
- Beck – Kartellen (2002)
- Beck – Enslingen (2002)
- Beck – Okänd avsändare (2002)
- Beck – Annonsmannen (2002)
- Beck – Pojken i glaskulan (2002)
- Beck – Sista vittnet (2002)
- 2002 – Nya tider
- 2003 - Skeppsholmen
- 2005 – Kommissionen
