= Alexander Keiller (businessman) =

Scottish businessperson

Alexander Keiller (1 July 1804, Dundee – 27 March 1874 Gothenburg) was a Scottish businessman active in Gothenburg, Sweden.

Keiller arrived in Gothenburg in 1825, on account of the Keiller family's timber business in Sweden. Three years later he started a mill for machine spinning of flax and hemp, along with his compatriot William Gibson. This enterprise was shut down in 1839.

In 1841 Keiller opened a heavy engineering plant in Gothenburg, as a private company. In 1867 Keiller floated Göteborgs Mekaniska Verkstad on the stock exchange, and a year later he retired completely from the workshops. He died in Gothenburg on 27 March 1874 .

He was the father of James Keiller who in 1906 donated the area around Ramberget to Gothenburg city which here had built Keillers park.

== Gallery ==
Alexander Keiller

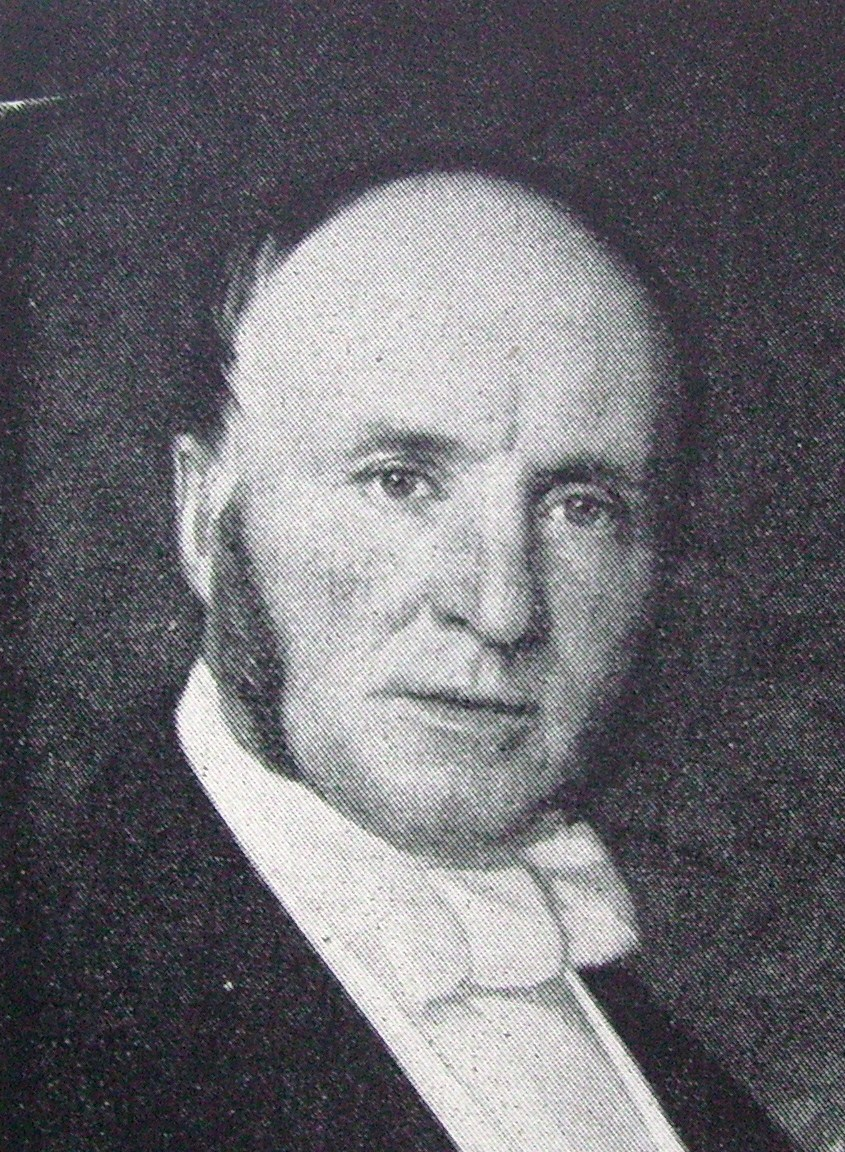
Alexander Keiller

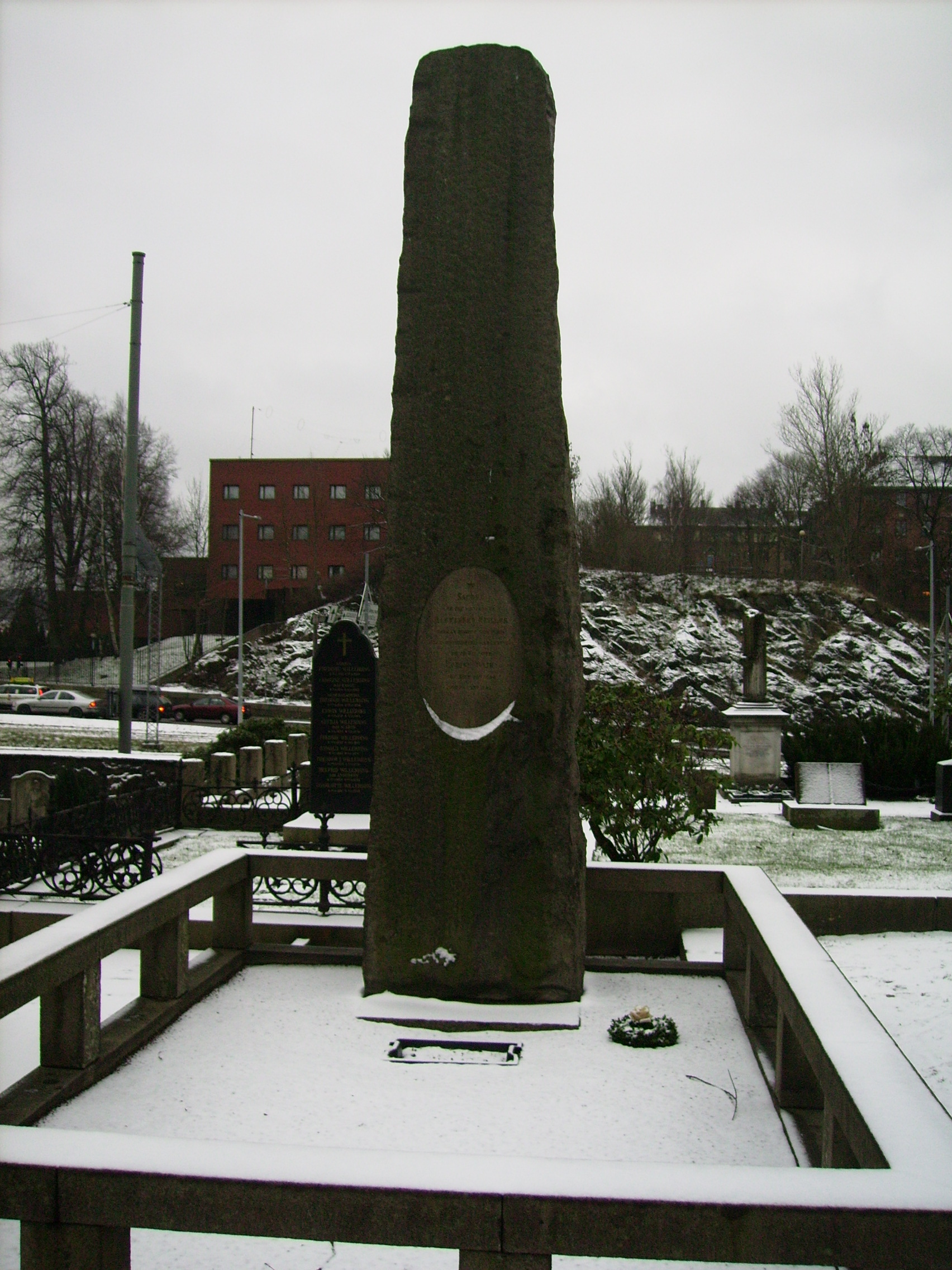
Businessman Alexander Keiller's grave (1804–1874) at Örgryte gamla kyrkogård, Gothenburg

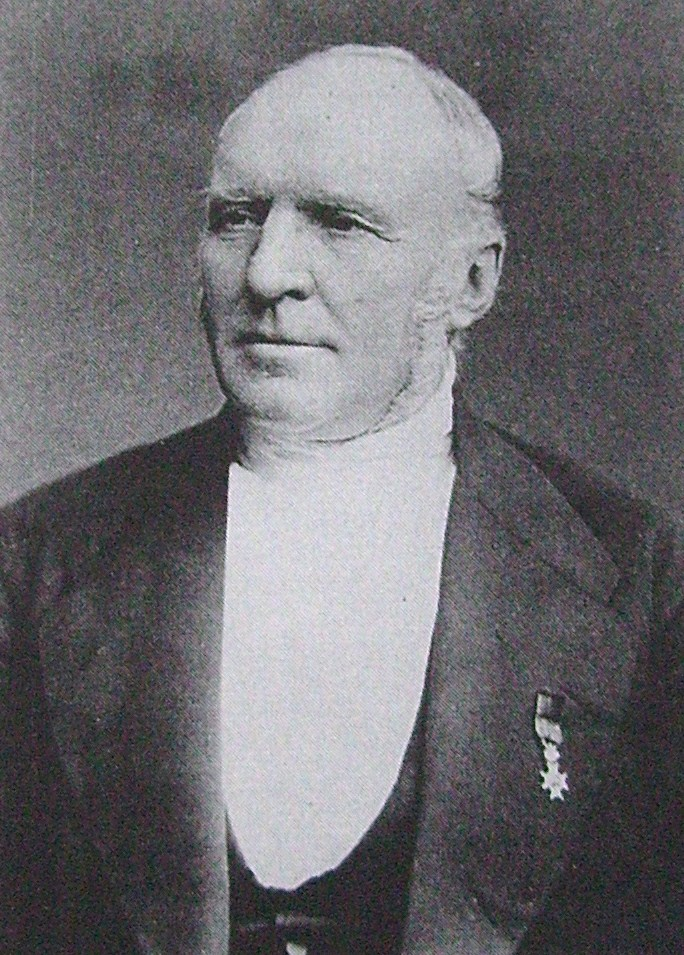
Alexander Keiller

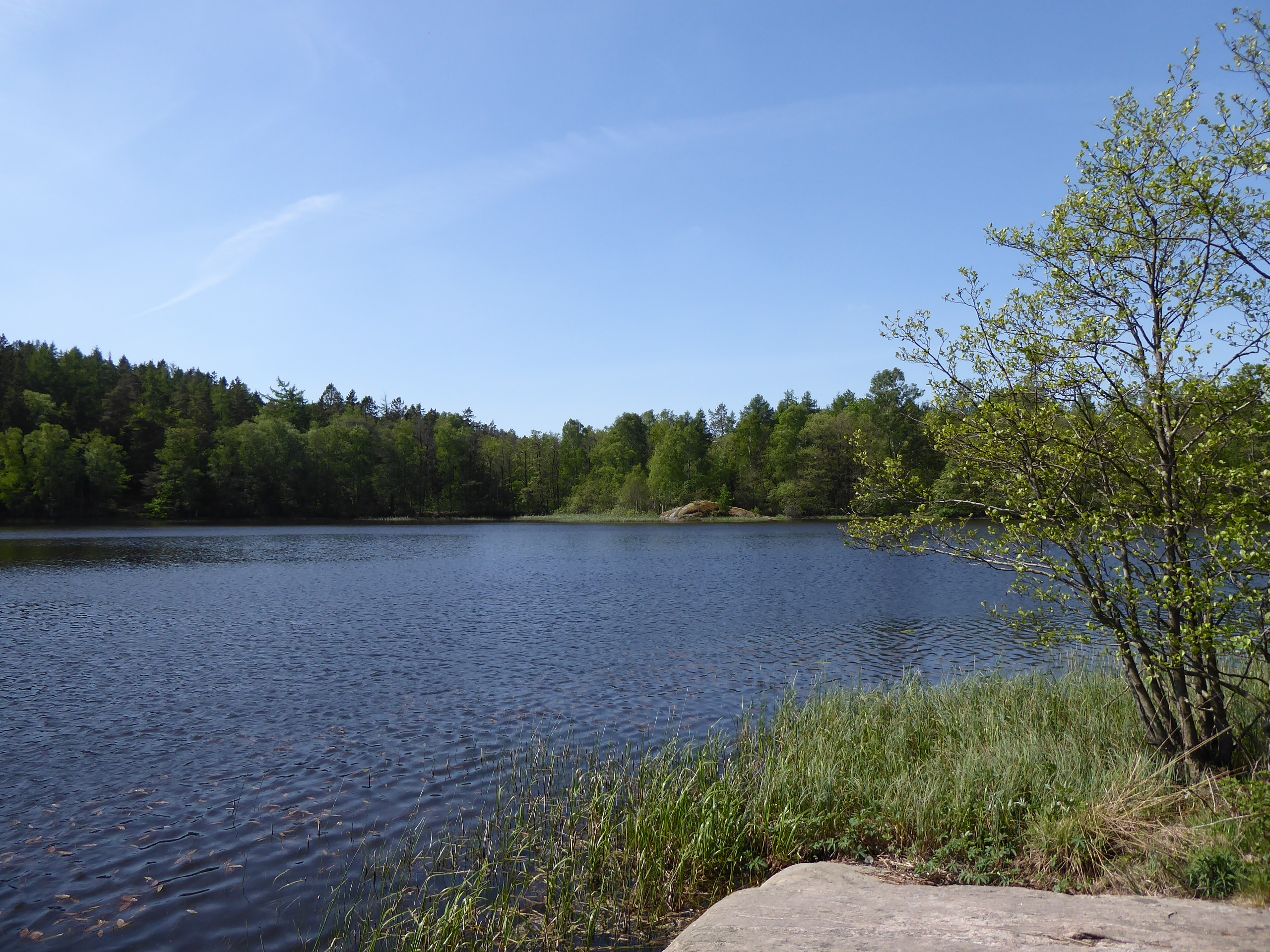
The lakelet Keillers damm in Ale Municipality, Sweden is named after Keiller.
