= Boy Culture =

- Theatrical release poster
- Directed by: Q. Allan Brocka
- Screenplay by: Q. Allan Brocka; Philip Pierce
- Based on: Boy Culture by Matthew Rettenmund
- Produced by: Stephen Israel; Philip Pierce; Victor Simpkins; Phil Lobel
- Starring: Derek Magyar; Darryl Stephens; Patrick Bauchau; Jonathon Trent; Emily Brooke Hands
- Narrated by: Derek Magyar
- Cinematography: Joshua Hess
- Edited by: Phillip J. Bartell
- Music by: Ryan Beveridge
- Production companies: Boy Culture LLC; NeoFight Film; Pierce Films
- Distributed by: TLA Releasing
- Release dates: April 1, 2006 (London Lesbian and Gay Film Festival); March 23, 2007 (United States; limited)
- Running time: 87 minutes
- Country: United States
- Language: English
- Box office: $220,409

Boy Culture is a 2006 American romantic drama film directed by Q. Allan Brocka, based on the 1995 novel of the same name by Matthew Rettenmund. The film stars Derek Magyar, Darryl Stephens, Patrick Bauchau, Jonathon Trent, and Emily Brooke Hands. Boy Culture: Generation X, a sequel series was released in 2023.

== Plot ==
A successful escort describes in a series of confessions his entangled romantic relationships with his two roommates and an older, enigmatic client.

The story remains the same as the novel, about a man who goes by only the letter "X" to maintain his anonymity and relationships between his two roommates—one of whom he's in love with—and an enigmatic older client who challenges him to find his heart before he will consent to sex.

The film's differences from the novel include Andrew's character (now an African-American) and the location of the story in Seattle, Washington, instead of Chicago, Illinois.

== Cast ==
- Derek Magyar as Alex "X"
- Darryl Stephens as Andrew
- Patrick Bauchau as Gregory Talbot
  - Chris Bethards as young Gregory
- Jonathon Trent as Joey
- Emily Brooke Hands as Lucy
- George Jonson as Blondie
- Kyle Santler as Scooter
- Matt Riedy as Frank
- Clifford Harrington as Renaldo
  - Joshua Boswell as young Renaldo
- Peyton Hinson as Jill
- Demene Hall as Zelma
- William Hall, Jr. as Oren
- Molly Manago as Cheyenne
- Laprell Nelson as Matthew
- Q. Allan Brocka as Bruce Lee

== Production ==
Boy Culture is based on a novel, with a few important differences found between the two. It was decided in the film to set it in Seattle rather than Chicago, and to make substantial differences to the character of Andrew, including his ethnicity. The film is also noted for the careful eye of the director, who managed to turn what was an 18-day production cycle into a fully realized film.

== Release ==
The film made its world premiere in the United Kingdom at the London Lesbian and Gay Film Festival (since renamed BFI Flare: London LGBT Film Festival), on April 1, 2006, and made its debut in the United States at the Tribeca Film Festival on April 26, 2006. It subsequently received a very limited theatrical release in the United States on March 23, 2007.

Film festival circuit

Boy Culture was shown at the following film festivals:

- 2006 London Lesbian and Gay Film Festival - April 1, 2006
- 2006 Tribeca Film Festival - April 26, 2006
- 2006 Seattle Film Festival - May 25, 2006
- 2006 Atlantic Film Festival - September 15, 2006
- 2006 Verzaubert Queer Film Festival - November 14, 2006
- 2006 Paris Gay and Lesbian Film Festival - November 19, 2006
- 2007 Cleveland International Film Festival - March 16, 2007
- 2007 Philly Film Festival - April 6, 2007
- 2007 Mostra Internacional de Cinema Gay i Lèsbic de Barcelona - July 7, 2007

== Reception ==
=== Critical response ===
Boy Culture currently holds a 71% rating on Rotten Tomatoes based on 31 reviews; the consensus states: "Eloquent one-liners and quick pacing make Boy Culture sharper than the typical gay indie flick." On Metacritic, based on 12 critics, the film has a 56/100 rating, signifying "mixed or average" reviews. Maitland McDonagh from TV Guide wrote, "Shrewder than you'd think and not half as dumb as it looks." Jeannette Catsoulis from The New York Times wrote, "A slick and absorbing drama." Ronnie Scheib from Variety wrote, "A strong cast, formal visual style and cynical voiceover that propels the action help elevate this Seattle-set gay romp from the ranks of the stereotypical."

=== Awards ===
Year	Festival	Award	Category	Recipients
2006	L.A. Outfest	Grand Jury Award	Best Screenplay	Q.Allan Brocka; Philip Pierce
2006	Milan International Lesbian and Gay Film Festival	Paramount Comedy Award		Q.Allan Brocka
2006	Philadelphia International Gay & Lesbian Film Festival	Jury Prize	Best Film; Best Narrative Feature	Q.Allan Brocka
2006	Rhode Island International Film Festival	First Prize	Alternative Spirit Award	Q.Allan Brocka
2006	Fairy Tale Film Festival	Audience Award	Best Film	Q.Allan Brocka
2006	Honolulu Rainbow Film Festival	Rainbow Award	Best Feature Film	Q.Allan Brocka
2006	LesGaiCineMad, Madrid International LGBT Film Festival	Jury Prize	Best Director	Q.Allan Brocka
2006	Long Island Gay and Lesbian Film Festival	Jury Award	Best Men's Feature	Q.Allan Brocka
2007	Festróia - Tróia International Film Festival	Prize of the City of Setúbal	Best Film; American Independents	Q.Allan Brocka
2008	Glitter Awards	Glitter Award	Best Actor	Derek Magyar
2008	Glitter Awards	Glitter Award	Best Independent Film	Q.Allan Brocka

== Home media ==
The film was released on DVD on August 14, 2007, courtesy of TLA Video. The release includes an audio commentary from writer/director Q. Allan Brocka and writing partner Philip Pierce, interviews with Brocka and the four stars, deleted scenes, premiere footage from the Tribeca Film Festival and the film's trailer.

== Boy Culture: Generation X ==
In 2017, a Kickstarter campaign was launched for Boy Culture: The Series. An episodic sequel to the original film, it originally starred Matthew Wilkas (X), Darryl Stephens (Andrew), Matthew Crawford (Chayce), as well as Stephen Guarino and singer Steve Grand. The campaign met its funding goal and the series was filmed in August 2018. It was later announced that Derek Magyar, who played the lead role "X" in the original film, is now reprising his role. Taking over for Matthew Wilkas who was originally announced to replace him.

In June 2021, Magyar announced that the series will be seen publicly before the end of the year. On August 3, 2021, The Kickstarter was updated to include the date of the 1st public viewing to be at the 21st FilmOut San Diego on September 11, 2021, at the Museum of Photographic Arts (MOPA) at Balboa Park.

The title of the series eventually changed to Boy Culture: Generation X and was released on all streaming platforms on November 7, 2023
