= Beck – Sista vittnet =

Swedish action movie

- Swedish DVD-cover
- Written by: Cilla Börjlind; Rolf Börjlind
- Directed by: Harald Hamrell
- Starring: Peter Haber; Mikael Persbrandt; Malin Birgerson
- Country of origin: Sweden
- Original language: Swedish

Production
- Producers: Lars Blomgren; Börje Hansson
- Running time: 105 min

Original release
- Release: 4 January 2002

Beck – Sista vittnet (English: Beck – The Last Witness) is a 2002 film about the Swedish police detective Martin Beck directed by Harald Hamrell.

== Cast ==
- Peter Haber as Martin Beck
- Mikael Persbrandt as Gunvald Larsson
- Malin Birgerson as Alice Levander
- Marie Göranzon as Margareta Oberg
- Hanns Zischler as Josef Hillman
- Ingvar Hirdwall as Martin Beck's neighbour
- Rebecka Hemse as Inger (Martin Beck's daughter)
- Jimmy Endeley as Robban
- Mårten Klingberg as Nick
- Peter Hüttner as Oljelund
- Gunilla Röör as Lillemor "Limo" Fransson
- Thomas Hanzon as Mellgren
- Bo Höglund as Mats (the waiter)
- Anki Lidén as Marianne Berncroft
- Maksim Lapitskii as Teddy
- Mattias Silvell as Lech
- Sofia Helin as Sofija
- Jarmo Mäkinen as Juri
- Mikael Rundquist as Verner Jonasson
- Jan Waldekranz as Hollman
- Peter Falkenborg as Löfqvist
