= Keillers Park (film) =

2006 Swedish drama film

- English-language promotional poster
- Directed by: Susanna Edwards
- Written by: Pia Gradvall
- Starring: Mårten Klingberg; Piotr Giro; Karin Bergquist; Gösta Bredefeldt
- Release date: 2006
- Running time: 91 minutes
- Country: Sweden
- Language: Swedish

Keillers Park is a 2006 Swedish drama film directed by Susanna Edwards and written by Pia Gradvall. Inspired by the Keillers Park murder case, it stars Mårten Klingberg as Peter, who becomes the first suspect after his boyfriend Nassim (Piotr Giro) is found murdered in a park. The film received mixed to negative reviews from critics.

== Plot ==
After Nassim is found murdered in a park, the police suspect his boyfriend Peter and bring him in for questioning. They also find an unregistered gun in his apartment. Through flashbacks, the beginning of Peter and Nassim's relationship is explored.

== Cast ==
- Mårten Klingberg as Peter Andreis Feldmanis
- Piotr Giro as Nassim Ghabbar
- Karin Bergquist as Maria
- Gösta Bredefeldt as Bruno: Peter's father
- Ia Langhammer as Rodite
- Robert Jelinek as Kevin
- Karin Sjöberg as Bettan
- Jan Holmquist as Roland Staaf: police interrogator
- Tova Magnusson as Asa Blom: police interrogator
- Christian Hollbrink as Jonas
- Jonatan Rodriguez as Zaffa
- Polly Kisch as Yasna
- Mats Blomgren as Hasse
- Peter Eriksson as Janne

== Production ==
It was Susanna Edwards and written by Pia Gradvall. The film was inspired by the Keillers Park murder case.

== Reception ==
Gunnar Rehlin wrote in Variety that the film was "striking to look at, but lacking the passion to make the central story convince." It received a score of 2/5 from Patrik Andersson in Göteborgs-Posten. Hynek Pallas also gave the film a generally negative review for Svenska Dagbladet, criticizing Edwards' use of "oblique camera angles and black-and-white sequences" and the lead character's backstory. However, he found the sex scenes compelling. One positive review came from Dagens Nyheter film critic Helena Lindblad, who described the film as a "gripping tale of love, class, sex and death."

== See also ==
- List of Swedish films of the 2000s
- List of LGBTQ-related films of 2006
- List of LGBTQ-related films directed by women
