= Beck – Hämndens pris =

2001 Swedish television film

- Swedish DVD-cover
- Written by: Rolf Börjlind; Cilla Börjlind
- Directed by: Kjell Sundvall
- Starring: Peter Haber; Mikael Persbrandt; Sophie Tolstoy
- Country of origin: Sweden
- Original language: Swedish

Production
- Producers: Lars Blomgren; Börje Hansson
- Running time: 92 minutes

Original release
- Release: 27 June 2001

Beck – Hämndens pris (English: Beck – The Price of Vengeance) is a Swedish police film about Martin Beck, directed by Kjell Sundvall and released in June 2001.

== Plot ==
It is night. A police car pulls over near a van with a flat tire on a desolate highway, where two young men are changing the tire. The police officers step out of the patrol car and offer their help. Suddenly, a third person gets out of the van. One of the officers reacts instantly - this man is a well known criminal, he understands he is recognized. He has also robbed a military camp ten minutes ago, and the van is loaded with explosives and assault rifles. The situation is tense. Later on, the two police officers are found shot dead execution-style. Martin Beck is working on the case and gets all the resources he needs to get the unknown murderers. The hunt gets complicated, because Martin's partner, Gunvald Larsson, was a close friend to one of the killed police officers and he is ready to use literally any method to find the killer.

== Cast ==
- Peter Haber as Martin Beck
- Mikael Persbrandt as Gunvald Larsson
- Sophie Tolstoy as Sara Beijer
- Marie Göranzon as Margareta Oberg
- Per Morberg as Joakim Wersén
- Jimmy Endeley as Robban
- Mårten Klingberg as Nick
- Rebecka Hemse as Inger (Martin Beck's daughter)
- Ingvar Hirdwall as Martin Beck's neighbour
- Shanti Roney as Dag Sjöberg
- Matti Berenett as Victor Bengtsson
- Martin Aliaga as Santos Golenza
- Peter Hüttner as Oljelund
- Johan Kustus as Rickard Gudmundsson
- Ingela Olsson as Martina Gudmundsson
- Anders Byström as Leif Gudmunsson
- Fredrik Myrberg as Sten Eriksson
- Bengt Magnusson as himself (news journalist; uncredited)

== Reception ==
The film has been criticized for the similarities with the Murders at Malexander in 1999, but Rolf Börjlind has said that the draft of the film was finished in 1997.
