= Sophie Tolstoy =

Swedish actress

- Born: Sophie Alexandra Tolstoy; 25 March 1967 (age 59); Lidingö, Sweden

Sophie Alexandra Tolstoy Regen (née Tolstoy; Russian: Толста́я, romanized: Tolstaya; born 25 March 1967 in Lidingö, Stockholm County) is a Swedish actress. She is the older sister to the actor Alexander Tolstoy. Tolstoy is best known for her role as Sara Beijer in Beck – Hämndens pris.

== Filmography ==
- Beck – Hämndens pris (2001)
- 2001 – Nya tider
- 1999 – Jakten på en mördare
- 1999 – Ett litet rött paket
- 1997 – Snoken
- 1996 – Anna Holt
- Nöd ut (1996)
- Bara du & jag (1994)
- Werther (1990)
