= Itzik Galili =

Israeli choreographer (born 1961)

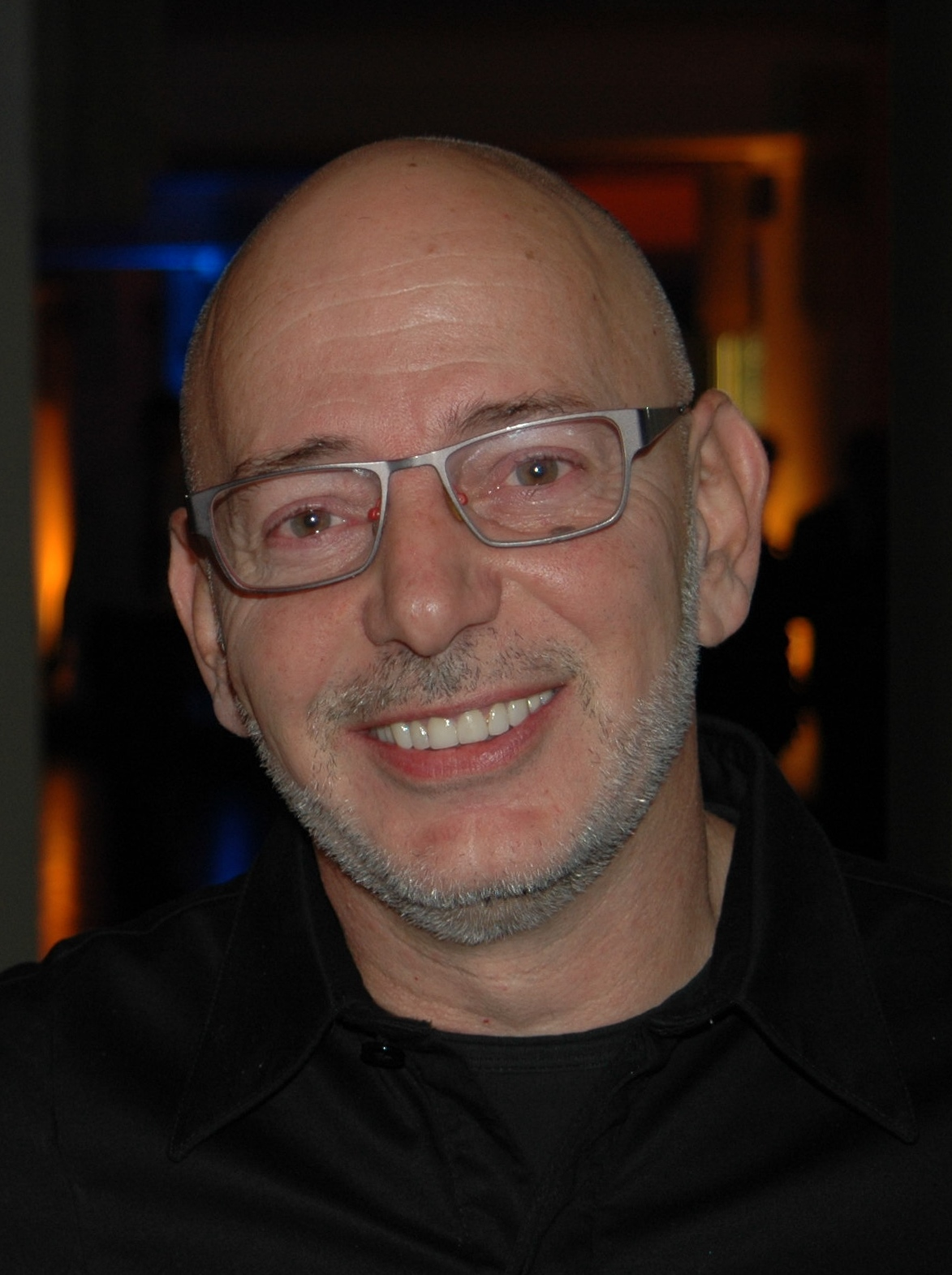
Itzik Galili (2014)

Itzik Galili (Hebrew: יצחק גלילי; born 1961 in Tel Aviv) is an Israeli choreographer.

== Career ==
After having been a member of the Batsheva Dance Company and Bat-Dor Dance Company in his country, he moved to the Netherlands in 1991, where he founded his own company. The Dutch Ministry of Culture nominated him in 1997 as Artistic Director of a new company for contemporary dance with public funding, NND / Galili Dance based in Groningen. In 2009, he moved to Amsterdam, invited by a new Amsterdam dance company, Dansgroep Amsterdam (DGA) as co-artistic director, together with Kristina de Chatel.

He has built an oeuvre of more than 60 works and has created for and worked with international companies such as: Balé da Cidade de São Paulo, Les Ballets de Monte Carlo, Batsheva Dance Company, Bayerisches Staatsoper Munich, Cisne Negro, Diversions Dance Company, Dutch National Ballet, Gulbenkian Ballet, Les Grands Ballets Canadiens, Nederlands Dans Theater II, Norrdans, Royal Finnish Ballet, Rambert Dance Company, Royal Winnipeg Ballet, Scapino Ballet and Stuttgart Ballet.

== Awards ==
- 1991: Originality prize at the Gvanim Choreographic Competition for his piece Old Cartoons.
- 1992: Public Prize at the International Competition for Choreographers in Groningen with his creation The Butterfly Effect
- 1994: Selected for the Culture Award (Phillip Morris Award) for exceptional talent
- 2002: VSCD Choreography Prize ("Zwaan") and a VSCD Nomination for Best Production Season 2005–2006.
- 2006: Knight in the Order of Orange-Nassau.
