= Beck – Mannen utan ansikte =

- Swedish DVD-cover
- Written by: Cecilia Börjlind; Rolf Börjlind
- Directed by: Harald Hamrell
- Starring: Peter Haber; Mikael Persbrandt; Malin Birgerson
- Country of origin: Sweden
- Original language: Swedish

Production
- Producers: Lars Blomgren; Börje Hansson
- Running time: 90 min

Original release
- Release: 2001

Beck – Mannen utan ansikte (English: Beck – The Man Without a Face) is a 2001 film about the Swedish police detective Martin Beck directed by Harald Hamrell.

== Cast ==
- Peter Haber as Martin Beck
- Mikael Persbrandt as Gunvald Larsson
- Malin Birgerson as Alice Levander
- Marie Göranzon as Margareta Oberg
- Hanns Zischler as Josef Hillman
- Ingvar Hirdwall as Martin Beck's neighbour
- Rebecka Hemse as Inger (Martin Beck's daughter)
- Jimmy Endeley as Robban
- Mårten Klingberg as Nick
- Peter Hüttner as Oljelund
- Fikret Cesmeli as Hammad
- Amir Barghashi as Hassan Ahmed
- Michalis Koutsogiannakis as Tahmed Ahmed
- Stina Ekblad as Angelica Beckman
- Leif Andrée as Jörgen Beckman
