= Beck – Annonsmannen =

- Swedish DVD-cover
- Written by: Cilla Börjlind; Rolf Börjlind
- Directed by: Daniel Lind Lagerlöf
- Starring: Peter Haber; Mikael Persbrandt; Malin Birgerson
- Country of origin: Sweden
- Original language: Swedish

Production
- Producers: Lars Blomgren; Börje Hansson
- Running time: 88 min

Original release
- Release: 2002

Beck – Annonsmannen (English: Beck – The Advertising Man) is a 2002 film about the Swedish police detective Martin Beck directed by Daniel Lind Lagerlöf.

== Selected cast ==
- Peter Haber as Martin Beck
- Mikael Persbrandt as Gunvald Larsson
- Malin Birgerson as Alice Levander
- Marie Göranzon as Margareta Oberg
- Hanns Zischler as Josef Hillman
- Ingvar Hirdwall as Martin Beck's neighbour
- Mårten Klingberg as Nick
- Jimmy Endeley as Robban
- Peter Hüttner as Oljelund
- Rebecka Hemse as Inger (Martin Beck's daughter)
- Neil Bourguiba as Wilhelm (Inger's son)
- Andreas Kundler as Jesper Wennquist
- Eva Fritjofsson as Elin (Jesper's mother)
- Livia Millhagen as Malin Tavast
- Magnus Krepper as Bengt Tavast
- Angela Kovacs as Doctor
- Sten Elfström as Rune Fjällgård
- Tommy Andersson as Svanborg
