= Anders Byström =

Swedish actor

Anders Byström (born 1 March 1962 in Kungälv) is a Swedish actor. He currently lives in Stockholm.

Byström is engaged to write "snapsvisor". He has won the title as Swedish champion of "snapsvisor" three years in a row. He has won three gold medals, two silver medals and three bronze medals in snaps-SM. Most recently he won gold in 2005. In July, 2006, Byström released a CD with "snapsvisor" called "Byströms bästa snapsvisor", which has 22 songs.

== Filmography ==
- Anna Holt – polis (1999)
- Beck – Hämndens pris (2001)
- Woman with Birthmark (2001)
- Rederiet (2001–2002)
