= Jimmy Endeley =

Swedish actor (born 1971)

- Born: 3 September 1971 (age 53); Sweden

Jimmy Endeley (born 3 September 1971) is a Swedish actor.

Endeley studied at Swedish National Academy of Mime and Acting in Stockholm 1992–95. He has been involved at Folkteatern in Gävle, Uppsala City Theatre and the Royal Dramatic Theatre. Endeley is best known for his role as Robban in the films about the police Martin Beck.

== Filmography ==
- Beck – Sista vittnet (2002)
- Beck – Pojken i glaskulan (2002)
- 2002 – Stackars Tom
- Beck – Annonsmannen (2002)
- Beck – Okänd avsändare (2002)
- Beck – Enslingen (2002)
- Beck – Kartellen (2002)
- Beck – Mannen utan ansikte (2001)
- Beck – Hämndens pris (2001)
- 1999 – Ingen som jag
- 1996 – En fyra för tre
- Nöd ut (1996)
