= Beck – Pojken i glaskulan =

- Swedish DVD-cover
- Written by: Cilla Börjlind; Rolf Börjlind
- Directed by: Daniel Lind Lagerlöf
- Starring: Peter Haber; Mikael Persbrandt; Malin Birgerson
- Country of origin: Sweden
- Original language: Swedish

Production
- Producers: Lars Blomgren; Börje Hansson

Original release
- Release: 2002

Beck – Pojken i glaskulan (Beck - The boy in the glass ball) is a 2002 film about the Swedish police detective Martin Beck directed by Daniel Lind Lagerlöf.

== Synopsis ==
Detective Beck investigates the murder of a woman. The suspect is her autistic son, who cannot testify, and the investigators are trying to understand the whole truth.

== Cast ==
- Peter Haber as Martin Beck
- Mikael Persbrandt as Gunvald Larsson
- Malin Birgerson as Alice Levander
- Marie Göranzon as Margareta Oberg
- Hanns Zischler as Josef Hillman
- Ingvar Hirdwall as Martin Beck's neighbour
- Rebecka Hemse as Inger (Martin Beck's daughter)
- Jimmy Endeley as Robban
- Mårten Klingberg as Nick
- Peter Hüttner as Oljelund
- Anders Nyström as Waltberg
- Lena Carlsson as Lisa Norling
- Ulf Friberg as Kaj Gerstedt
- Anders Palm as Bernt Jansson
- Leo Hallerstam as Jack Svensson
- Per Svensson as Stefan Svensson
