= Boy Culture (novel) =

1995 novel

- Author: Matthew Rettenmund
- Cover artist: Junie Lee
- Language: English
- Published: 1995 (St. Martin's Press)
- Publication place: United States
- Media type: Print (paperback)
- Pages: 181 pp
- ISBN: 0-312-14553-5
- OCLC: 39845192

Boy Culture is a 1995 novel by Matthew Rettenmund. It centers on a call boy in the city of Chicago, Illinois and his two roommates. The protagonist goes by X throughout the book in order to maintain his anonymity. In 2006, it was adapted into a movie by filmmaker Q. Allan Brocka, starring Patrick Bauchau, Darryl Stephens, Emily Stiles, and newcomer Derek Magyar as "X". Award Nominated writers Craig Hepworth and Adele Stanhope are adapting the novel to the stage, Boy Culture the play will open August 2012 in Manchester, UK and will be produced by Vertigo Theatre Productions.

== Characters ==
=== Main characters ===
- X is a male prostitute, and has been ever since he was young
- Andrew is X's love interest and one of his two roommates
- Joe, X's other roommate is a "seventeen-and-a-half" year old twink, who has a crush on X
