= Gaël Aymon =

French film producer and director (born 1973)

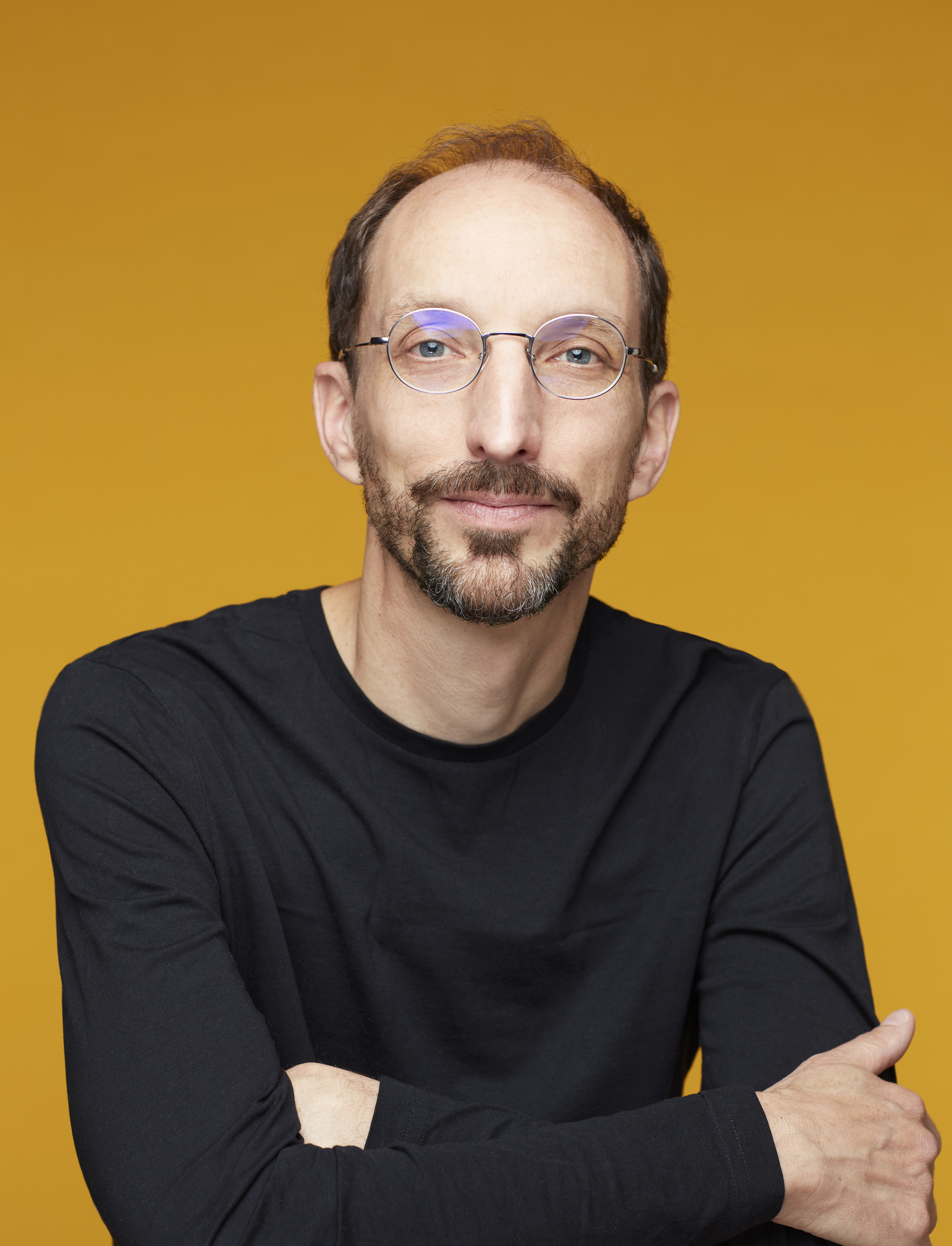
- GAEL AYMON by Pascal Ito 2022
- Born: 12 December 1973 (age 52); Paris, France
- Occupation: Novelist
- Writing career
- Genre: Children's literature
- Notable works: "My reputation"; "Forever 17"; "And your life will be mine"; "Silent Boy"; "Tales of another type"
- Website: gaelaymon.com

Gaël Aymon is an author, screenwriter, film director and producer born in Paris, France.

== Biography ==
Having attended the acting schools of Les Cours Florent and the Studio Pygmalion, Gael Aymon first embarks on a career in acting and directing. He has worked as a producer and distributor for the cinema and theatre.

He was first published as a children's author in 2010. His books have received numerous awards and have been translated into Chinese, Korean, Romanian, Italian, Spanish (Spain and Mexico), Catalan, German and Portuguese (Brasil).

In 2023 and 2024, he is one of the nominees for the International Astrid Lindgren Memorial Award.

== Books ==
=== For teenagers and young adults ===
- My declaration of love (Gallimard Jeunesse - Novel - 2026)
- The war of the Shadows (L'Ecole des loisirs - Novel - 2025)
- Forever 17 (Nathan - Novel - 2024)
- A night of my childhood (Nathan - Novel - 2023)
- The Apprentice Storyteller (L'Ecole des loisirs - Novel - 2022)
- Grim, son of the swamp (Nathan - Novel - 2021)
- Silent Boy (Nathan - Novel - 2020)
- And your life will be mine (Nathan - Novel - 2020)
- My brother soul (Actes Sud Junior - Novel- 2018)
- The planet of the 7 sleepers (Nathan - Novel - 2018)
- Golden Valley (Gallimard Jeunesse - Novel - 2016)
- The forgotten heroes - Volume II "The Masters" (Actes Sud Junior - Novel- 2016)
- The forgotten heroes - Volume I "The gates of oblivion" (Actes Sud Junior - Novel- 2015)
- Forgetting Camille (Actes Sud Junior - Novel - Rentrée littéraire 2014)
- My reputation (Actes Sud Junior – Novel – 2013 / new edition Gallimard 2022)

=== For children ===
- My 2nd brain (L'Ecole des Loisirs - 2024)
- Really scary! (Nathan - 2022)
- SOS little mermaids - Volume I to VI (Nathan - 2021-2022)
- Sleeping Beauty (Nathan - 2020)
- The golden years - Volume VIII (Nathan - 2020)
- The beauty and the beast wityh diamond tears (Gautier-Languereau - 2019)
- The golden years - Volume VI & VII (Nathan - 2019)
- The golden years - Volume III, IV & V (Nathan - 2018)
- Snow White (Nathan - 2018)
- The golden years - Volume I & II (Nathan - 2017)
- The tale of the three flakes (Bayard Editions - J'aime Lire poche - 2015)
- Snowdrop ans thye 3 ogresses (Éditions Talents Hauts - 2014) – supported by Amnesty International
- The wold's mightiest secret (Les éditions du Ricochet – 2014)
- The son of the giants ("Le fils des géants" – Éditions Talents Hauts – 2013) – supported by Amnesty International
- Scarlet Slippers ("Les souliers écarlates" – Éditions Talents Hauts – 2012) – supported by Amnesty International
- An Upside Down Birthday ("L'anniversaire à l'envers" – Éditions Talents Hauts – 2012)
- Tales of Another Type ("Contes d'un autre genre" – Éditions Talents Hauts – 2011)
- Giga-Boy (Éditions Talents Hauts – 2011))
- A Space in the Playground ("Une place dans la cour" – Éditions Talents Hauts- 2011)
- Princess Candy-Floss ("La princesse Rose-praline" – Éditions Talents Hauts- 2010)

== Awards ==
Full list here : http://gaelaymon.com/ressources/

- Gael Aymon was nominated for the 2023 and the 2024 International Astrid Lindgren Memorial Award

The war of the Shadows

- IBBY Honour List 2026, writing category

Forever 17

- Prix Libr’à Nous 2025
- Prix des Libraires en Seine 2025

The apprentice Storyteller

- Prix des Embouquineurs 2024
- Prix Dé’LIRE des jeunes lecteurs du Cambrésis 2025

Silent Boy

- Prix Louis Mathis 2021

Et ta vie m'appartiendra

- Prix des Lecteurs en Seine 2022
- Prix Lire Elire 2021

Oublier Camille

- Programme 2016 de l’Éducation Nationale, lectures cursives jeunesse, classes de 4e, « Dire l’amour, dire l’absence »
- Prix littéraire Au cœur des page, Nort-sur-Erdre 2019
- Prix des collégiens de Clamart 2016

Ma réputation

- Prix Gallimard des collégiens 2024
- Prix littéraire Marguerite-Bahuet 2017
- Prix littéraire "slam ta lecture " 2017
- Prix de la ville Cherbourg-Octeville 2015
- Prix Gr’Aisne de critique 2014-2015
- Prix Jacaranda 2016 (Maroc)

Perce-Neige et les trois ogresses

- Prix Littéraire du Val de l'Aurence 2016

Une place dans la cour

- Prix Tartines Fraises 2013
