= Serge Ankri =

French film director

Serge Ankri (Hebrew: סרג' אנקרי; born 1949, in Tunis) is a film director.

He lived and studied in France and gained a Bachelor of Arts degree in Nice. He migrated to Israel in 1973. He is a graduate of the Film & Televsision Department, Tel Aviv University. He produced two short fiction films which were shown at the Festival of Mediterranean Cinema of Vittel in 1981: Love and Football and The Strike is Over.

He has worked for two years for Israeli Television as a cameraman and reporter. In addition to his activities as a film director, Ankri was the film critic for the weekly publication Realities at Israel and teaches cinema at Tel Aviv University.

== Filmography ==
- Love and Football (1979)
- The Strike is Over (1982)
- Burning Land (1984)
- Strangers in the Night (1993)
- Mama's Couscous (1994)
- A Matter of Time (2005)
