= Statross le Magnifique =

- Directed by: Rémi Lange
- Written by: Jann Halexander, Rémi Lange
- Produced by: Trilogie Halexander
- Starring: Jann Halexander
- Edited by: Sébastien Veen
- Music by: Jann Halexander
- Distributed by: Société Les Films de l'Ange
- Release date: June 2006
- Running time: 23 minutes
- Country: France
- Language: French

Statross le Magnifique is a 2006 film by director Rémi Lange featuring actor Jann Halexander.

This film is the first chapter of a trilogy about Statross Reichmann, an incarnation of the western world and all of its contradictions. Some stores in France and Belgium refused to sell the film due to the gay theme and three words printed large on the cover: sex, race, and death.

== Synopsis ==
Statross is a mixed-race baron who lives in a mansion haunted by the ghost of his father, a Nazi colonel. Statross is tormented by his identity and the past of his ancestors.

== Cast ==
- Jann Halexander as Statross
- Pascale Ourbih as Statross' girlfriend
- Antoine Parlebas as David Atzaïr
- Illmann Bel as Tarik
