= Piotr Giro =

Swedish choreographer (born 1974)

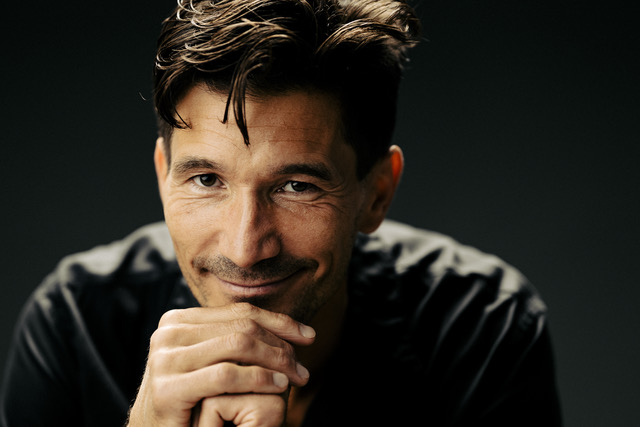
- Born: 1974 (age 51–52); Wałbrzych, Polish People's Republic
- Occupations: Actor, dancer, choreographer
- Years active: 1995–present
- Website: piotrgiro.com/en

Piotr Giro (born January 16, 1974) is a Polish-born Swedish actor, dancer and choreographer.

== Biography ==
Piotr Giro is educated at The Royal Swedish Ballet School in Stockholm and has been active since 1995 as an actor, dancer and choreographer both in Sweden and abroad.

Giro had his breakthrough when he portrayed the lead role in Romeo and Juliet at Royal Dramatic Theatre, a collaboration with Cirkus Cirkör, and the title role in Don Juan by Molière at Gothenburg City Theater. Giro had one of the leading roles in the film adaptation of Keillers Park by Susanna Edwards and has appeared in a number of films, including The Girl, the Mother and the Demons and Wellkåmm to Verona by Suzanne Osten.

Giro has performed with and toured alongside some of the world’s most renowned dance companies and choreographers including Batsheva Dance Company, Ultima Vez / Wim Vandekeybus, La La La Human Steps / Édouard Lock, Cullberg Ballet and Josef Nadj company. He has also collaborated with David Byrne and with Marc Ribot.

== Personal life ==
Piotr is a long time practitioner of Aikido, acrobatics and rock climbing. He also practices Zazen since 2010.

== Filmography ==
- 1999 – The Last Words / Ultima Vez & Flemish Film / Dir - Wim Vandekeybus
- 2000 – Inasmuch / Ultima Vez & Quasi Modo / Dir - Wim Vandekeybus
- 2001 – Mantra / Svt Drama / Dir - Jörgen Hjerdt
- 2002 – In Spite of Wishing and Wanting / Film in Vlaanderen / Dir - Wim Vandekeybus
- 2003 – Five Staircases / Svt Drama / Dir - Hanna Andersson
- 2003 – Skeppsholmen / Svt Drama / Dir - Simon Kaijser
- 2004 – Graveyard Island / Agadir Film / Dir - Martin Forsström & Daniel Möllberg
- 2006 – Wellkåmm to Verona / Filmlance & Metronome / Dir - Suzanne Osten
- 2006 – Keillers Park / Film i Väst / Dir - Susanna Edwards
- 2007 – The Blueberry War / Mañana Film AB / Dir - Lars-Göran Pettersson
- 2008 – Olof 1440 Min / iFilm / Dir - Johan Ribe
- 2009 – The Man Below the Stairs / Svt Drama / Dir - Daniel Lind Lagerlöf
- 2010 – Coffe / Svt Drama / Dir - Helena Franzén
- 2014 – The Ceremony / Svt Documentary / Dir - Lina Mannheimer
- 2015 – The Anatomy of Vengeance / Dir - Reich + Szyber
- 2016 – The Girl, Mother, and the Demons / Fundament Film / Dir - Suzanne Osten
- 2018 – Dance First / TriArt Film / Dir - Rikard Svensson
- 2025 – Cornelius / Short / Dir - Linus Lundgren

== Theatrework ==
- 2002 – 2003 - Romeo & Juliet by W. Shakespeare - (Romeo) - Royal Dramatic Theatre
- 2003 – 2004 - Dante's Divine Comedy - Gothenburg City Theatre
- 2004 – Don Juan by Moliére - (Don Juan) - Gothenburg City Theatre
- 2004 – Propaganda - The away team - Jens Östberg
- 2005 – 99% Unknown - Circus Cirkör
- 2006 – Vagabond - (Piotr Giro)
- 2006 – Momo the grey gentlemen - (Gigi) - Stockholm City Theatre
- 2008 – Edward II - (Spencer) - Unga Klara - Stockholm City Theater
- 2009 – 2011 - Unknown Pleasures - Dance theatre - Stockholm City Theater
- 2010 – Eaten by Men - Dance theatre - Reich + Szyber
- 2015 – 2017 - Disaster in the Jungle - (Nikos Skalkottas)
- 2017 – Because I'm worth it - (The man in the couple) - Stockholm City Theatre
- 2026 – Frankenstein - (Victor Frankenstein) - Turteatern

== Dancework ==
- 1995 – Royal Swedish Opera - Opera Aida
- 1995 – Royal Swedish Opera - Peer Gynt
- 1996 – Carl Olof Berg - ÄETT, Deuce
- 1996 – 1998 - Batsheva Dance Company - Ohad Naharin
- 1997 – Angelin Preljocaj - Batsheva Dance Company - Noces
- 1998 – Norrdans - Jens Östberg, Jo Strømgren
- 1998 – 2009 - Ultima Vez / Wim Vandekeybus
- 2000 – 2001 - Josef Nadj - L'Anatomie du fauve
- 2004 – Philippe Blanchard - Noodles
- 2005 – Renovating an object - Piotr Giro, Shintaro Oue
- 2005 – Cirkus Cirkör - 99% Unknown
- 2006 – Vagabond - Piotr Giro
- 2007 – 2008 - Örjan Andersson - Triptych
- 2008 – 2009 - Ultima Vez / Wim Vandekeybus - Spiegel
- 2009 – 2010 - Equal - Shintaro Oue, Piotr Giro, Satoshi Kudo
- 2011 – 2012 - Lena Philipsson - My Dream Show - Fredrik Rydman
- 2012 – Royal Swedish Opera - Bluebeard’s Castle / Trouble in Tahiti
- 2013 – Eurovision - interval act - Northern Lights - Fredrik Rydman
- 2014 – Jill Johnson - Hans Marklund - Hamburger Börs
- 2014 – Cullberg Ballet - 11th Floor - La La La Human Steps / Édouard Lock
- 2014 – 2015 - Bo.Le Ro - Piotr Giro, Shintaro Oue
- 2016 – Louise Crnkovic-Friis - Aarhus, Denmark
- 2016 – Ina Christel Johannessen - Come Back To See Us

== Commercial & Music Videos ==
- 1993 – Pandora / Trust Me / Dir - Unknown
- 1996 – Thomas Di Leva / Den Glada Stjärnan / Dir - Di Leva
- 2002 – Roxette / A Thing About You / Dir - Jonas Åkerlund
- 2006 – Backyard Babies / The Mess Age (How Could I Be So Wrong) - Sony Music
- 2011 – Elin Lanto / Color Me Blue / Dir - Rafael Edholm
- 2014 – Takida / To Have And To Hold / Dir - Bengt-Anton Runsten
- 2015 – Ikea commercial / Dir - Jens Jonsson
- 2015 – Elin Lanto / Burning Heart / Dir - Robin Robinovich
- 2016 – Weeping Willows / My Love Is Not Blind / Dir - David Kaijser
- 2016 – Magnus Uggla / Dyngrak(VR) / Dir - Unknown
