= Maple Palm =

- Theatrical release poster
- Directed by: Ralph Torjan
- Written by: Ralph Torjan; Robert J. Feldman
- Produced by: Ralph Torjan; Robert J. Feldman
- Starring: Deborah Stewart; Andrea Carvajal; Taymour Ghazi
- Edited by: Ralph Torjan
- Music by: Rebecca Hansen; Katy J.
- Distributed by: FATfilms LLC
- Release date: November 10, 2006
- Running time: 116 minutes
- Country: United States
- Language: English

Maple Palm is a 2006 American romantic drama film directed by Ralph Torjan.

== Premise ==
Maple Palm focuses on a lesbian couple, Nicole (Deborah Stewart) and Amy (Andrea Carvajal), who have been living together for fifteen years. Nicole is an illegal immigrant from Canada who has no protection under the law, since same-sex marriages are not recognized by the United States.

== Cast ==
- Deborah Stewart as Nicole
- Taymour Ghazi as Glen
- Andrea Carvajal as Amy
- Robert J. Feldman as Billy
- Lynda Lefever as Mom

== Reception ==
Kevin Thomas of the Los Angeles Times was moved by the conviction with which the cast threw themselves into the project, and felt the storyline was one with potential, but felt that the director should have used a lighter hand to increase believability and menace. Ernest Hardy of LA Weekly felt that the director took an important political and social issue and reduced it to a shameless manipulation of the viewer's emotions.
