= Mårten Klingberg =

Swedish actor, screenwriter and director (born 1968)

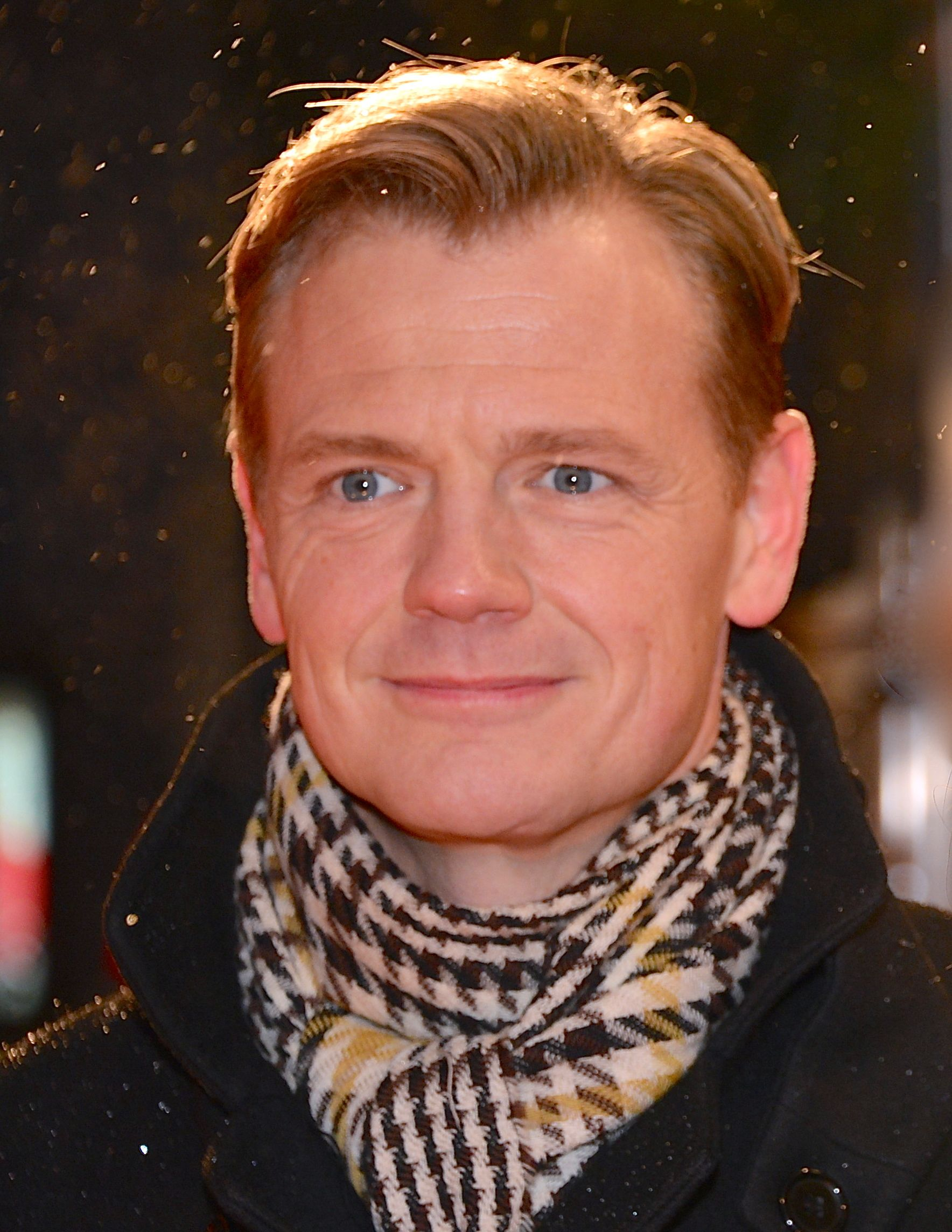
- Klingberg in 2012
- Born: Tomas Mårten Klingberg; 1 April 1968 (age 58); Spånga, Sweden
- Occupations: Actor, film director, screenwriter

Tomas Mårten Klingberg (born 1 April 1968) is a Swedish actor, screenwriter, and director. Klingberg is best known for his role as Nick in the films about the police detective Martin Beck.

He was born on 1 April 1968 in Spånga, Sweden.

He played the lead role of Peter in Keillers Park (2006).

== Selected filmography ==
- Beck – Rum 302 (2015)
- Cockpit (2012)
- Once Upon a Time in Phuket (2011)
- Keillers Park (2006)
- Kontorstid (2003)
- Beck – Sista vittnet (2002)
- Beck – Pojken i glaskulan (2002)
- Beck – Annonsmannen (2002)
- Beck – Okänd avsändare (2002)
- Beck – Enslingen (2002)
- Beck – Kartellen (2002)
- Beck – Mannen utan ansikte (2001)
- Beck – Hämndens pris (2001)
- Judith (2000)
- Två som oss (1999)
- Opportunus (1997)
- Skilda världar (1996)
- Bröderna Fluff (1996)
- Mitt sanna jag (1995)
- Petri tårar (1995)
- Bert (1994)
- Fasadklättraren (1991)

== Direction ==
- Moscow Noir (2018), directed episodes 7 & 8
- Offside (2006)
- Utan dig (2003)
- Viktor och hans bröder (2002)

== Screenplay ==
- Utan dig (2003)
- Browalls (1999)
