= Rémi Lange =

French film director (born 1969)

Rémi Lange (born 4 February 1969 in Gennevilliers, Hauts-de-Seine) is a French film director. Lange's films have mostly been released directly to video, except Omelette (1998) where he filmed his own coming out, and its sequel Les Yeux brouillés (2000), which both had general cinematic release in France. His films have been shown and have won awards at film festivals around the world.

Lange's films are not well known, but they do have a certain following. His usual themes are sexuality, notably homosexuality and queer culture (The Sex of Madame H, 2005). His films sometimes deliberately use amateur technology (Super 8 or miniDV). They are rich in personalities and events, macabre and funny at the same time, and always provocative. Lange touched on comedy and horror with Mes Parents (2004).

Lange founded his production company Les Films de l'Ange in 2004. In 2006, Lange directed Statross le Magnifique which was released on DVD in France in June 2006.

In 2007, Lange directed Devotee which was screened at many gay and lesbian film festivals. The OUTFEST 2008 guide described it as : "Daring and straightforward, DEVOTEE is the story of Hervé, an assertive 43-year-old man who was born without arms or legs. He meets a gorgeous young man online, a devotee (devoteeism (or acrotomophilia) is the sexual attraction to people with amputations) who seems like he might be different. Their encounter proves Hervé’s difficulty in finding a true connection with someone who is interested in treating him like a person rather than a mere fetish." Devotee was DVD released on the US in 2009.

Lange's fifth feature, Partir, the story of a young Tunisian boy going to France to shoot an underground movie, was released on DVD in France in August 2009.

== Filmographie ==
- 1992 : L'hospitalière
- 1994 : Les Anges dans nos campagnes
- 1996 : Le Super-8 n'est pas mort, il bande encore
- 1997 : Omelette
- 1999 : Les Yeux brouillés
- 2002 : L'invasion des pholades géantes
- 2003 : Tarik el hob
- 2004 : Mes Parents
- 2005 : The Sex of Madame H
- 2005 : Cake au Sirop de Cordom
- 2006 : Statross le Magnifique
- 2007 : Thyroid
- 2008 : Devotee (sélection aux Festivals New Fest de New York, Outfest de Los Angeles, aux festivals gays de Tel Aviv, Ljubljana, Barcelone où le film obtient une mention spéciale..., sortie États-Unis début 2009)
- 2009 : Partir (sortie DVD France le 31 août 2009)
- 2014 : Le Fétichiste
- 2015 : Le Chanteur (Prix du Jury au Festival In&Out de Nice 2015, Grand Prix au Festival du film artisanal et audacieux de Joyeuse 2015)
- 2018 : L'œuf dure
- 2019 : Prouve que tu es gay
- 2022 : Aboubakar et moi (chronique d'un confinement) (sortie DVD France le 5 juillet 2022)
- 2023 : Le Mexique m'excite
