= Derek Magyar =

American actor

- Born: July 18, 1980 (age 46); Keene, New Hampshire
- Occupation: Actor
- Years active: 2003–2014; 2019-present

Derek Magyar (born July 18, 1980) is an American actor. He is best known as the director and producer of the film Flying Lessons, as the lead character "X" in the film Boy Culture, and as Commander Kelby during the fourth season of Star Trek: Enterprise.

He graduated from the California Institute of the Arts in 2003 and has appeared in several TV shows and films. In 2005, he was cast in the role of Commander Kelby, the newly promoted chief engineer of the starship Enterprise in the TV series Star Trek: Enterprise. In 2006, he had his first starring role as "X" in the LGBT film Boy Culture opposite Patrick Bauchau, Darryl Stephens, and Jonathan Trent. In 2018, it was announced he would be reprising this role in a sequel, Boy Culture: The Series.

== Filmography ==
Year	Title	Role	Notes
2003	Last Stop	Quinn	(Short)
2003	JAG	LCpl Pete Kelly	TV series - Episode: "The Boast"
2004	The Projects Lumiere	Lucky	(Short)
2004	Boston Legal	Gregory Stone	TV series - Episode: "An Eye for an Eye"
2005	Star Trek: Enterprise	Commander Kelby	TV series - 5 episodes
2005	Charmed	Demon "Elkin"	TV series - Episode: "Still Charmed and Kicking"
2006	Boy Culture	X	2008 Glitter Awards: Best Actor
2008	Train	Todd	
2009	Medium	Garrett Russell	TV series - Episodes: "The Devil Inside, Part 1" and "How to Make a Killing in Big Business: Part 3"
2010	Flying Lessons		Director/Producer
2011	The Cape	Officer Phillips	TV series - Episodes: "Kozmo" and "Tarot"
2012	Criminal Minds	Jeff Collins	TV series - Episode: "A Family Affair"
2012	Major Crimes	Larry Clark	TV series - Pilot
2012	CSI: NY	Sebastian	TV series
2012	No One Lives	Flynn	
2013	Phantom	Garin	
2013	Rewind		Director/Producer
2013	Days of Our Lives	Jensen	TV series
