= Matthew Rettenmund =

American writer (born 1968)

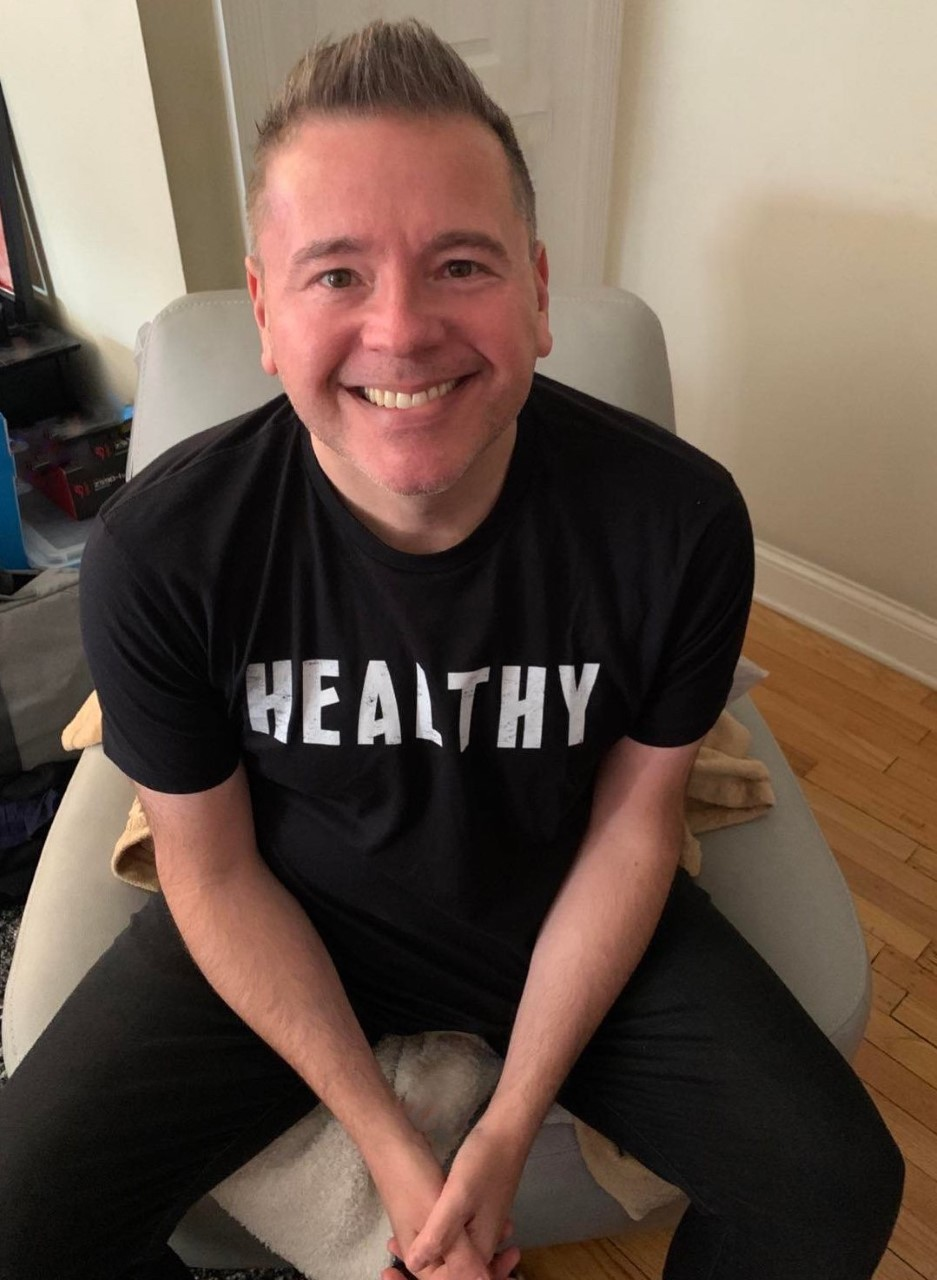
- Rettenmund circa 2022
- Born: Matthew Rettenmund; December 25, 1968; Michigan
- Education: University of Chicago
- Occupations: Editor and author
- Known for: Encyclopedia Madonnica, Boy Culture

Matthew Rettenmund (born December 25, 1968) is a Michigan-born editor, founder of Popstar! magazine and blog Boyculture.com, as well author of different books, including 1995 works, Encyclopedia Madonnica which debuted with solid reviews and sales, and the novel Boy Culture, which was later adapted into a movie in 2006 and in a spin-off web series in the 2020s with rave reviews.

Rettenmund moved to Chicago and began his first forays in media in 1987. He later moved to New York where he made his publishing debut at St. Martin's Press, after working as an editorial assistant. Through his career, Rettenmund has worked in LGBT-targeted magazines such as Mandate and Torso, and penned articles in a variety of publications, including The Advocate and Esquire magazines. Various international media outlets have acknowledged him as a savvy pop culture commentator, including Pitchfork, El País and Instinct magazine.

== Life and career ==
Matthew Rettenmund was born in 1968, in Michigan, United States. He identified himself as gay since his early life. He moved to Chicago, and studied at University of Chicago. He was featured inside their The University of Chicago Magazine in 1993. Rettenmund made his first forays in media in 1987 working for literary agent Jane Jordan Browne in Chicago, whom Rettenmund called her a "mentor". After college, Rettenmund moved to New York and went to work as an editorial assistant at St. Martin's Press.

Matthew Rettenmund made his publishing debut with St. Martin's Press' book Encyclopedia Madonnica (1995), based in the life and work of American singer Madonna, obtaining solid reviews and sales as well, followed by his novel Boy Culture the same year, celebrated upon its release by reviewers as an "example of a new and more sharply observant class of gay fiction". The lattermost work also inspired the name of the blog Boyculture.com which he founded, and was later adapted into a film in 2006, and a spin-off web series in early 2020s. Described as a "standout in the gay film genre", Queerty editor Cameron Scheetz, remarked the film as a "game-changer for putting gay sex and sexuality on screen in an honest, authentic way".

In 1998, Rettenmund became founder and editor-in-chief of Popstar! magazine. He has worked in a variety of other publications, including Mandate and Torso magazines in the 1990s, and has also penned articles for various media outlets, including The Advocate, PrideSource and Esquire. Rettenmund helped Bethenny Frankel run her own website.

In 1997, The Advocate acknowledged his "notable" success as an editor and writer, and almost two decades later, in 2015, magazine's editor Neal Broverman remarked his versatility career. Media outlets such as El País, Pitchfork, Xtra and Instinct magazines have acknowledged him as a savvy pop culture commentator. In 2014, HuffPost's Senior Culture Reporter, Curtis M. Wong called his blog Boyculture a "popular gay blog".

== Books ==
- Encyclopedia Madonnica. 1995. St. Martin's Press. ISBN 978-0312117825
- Boy Culture. 1995. St. Martin's Press. ISBN 978-0312372712
- Blind Items: A Novel. 1996. St. Martin's Press. ISBN 978-0312145538
- Totally Awesome 80s. 1996. St. Martin's Press. ISBN 978-0312144364
- Hilary Duff: All Access. 2005. Berkley Boulevard Books. ISBN 978-0425205198
- Starf*cker: A Meme-oir. 2015. Lethe Press. ISBN 978-1590215685

=== Re-prints ===
- Encyclopedia Madonnica 20: Madonna from a to Z. 2015. Boy Culture LLC. ISBN 978-0692515570
- Encyclopedia Madonnica: 40+ Years of Madonna. 2022. Boy Culture LLC. ISBN 978-1734238198
- Boy Culture: 25th-Anniversary Edition. 2019. Boy Culture LLC. ISBN 978-1734238105

==== Collaborations ====
- Queer Baby Names. 1996. St. Martin's Griffin. ISBN 978-0312147112 (with Jaye Zimet)
- Mlvc60: Madonna's Most Amazing Magazine Covers: A Visual Record. 2018. Boy Culture LLC. ISBN 978-0578403304 (With Anthony Coombs)
