= 2016 in Danish music =

The following is a list of notable events and releases of the year 2016 in Danish music.

== Events ==
=== January ===
- 8 - The first recording is released of Danish composer Hans Abrahamsen's Grawemeyer award-winning work, let me tell you.
- 27 The Léonie Sonning Music Foundation announces Leonidas Kavakos as the recipient of the Léonie Sonning Music Prize 2017.
- 29 - The Ernst von Siemens Music Foundation announces Per Nørgård as the recipient of the 2016 Ernst von Siemens Music Prize.

=== February ===
- 13 – The Dansk Melodi Grand Prix Final was arranged on February 13, at the Forum Horsens in Horsens.
- 28 – Jazz violinist Svend Asmussen turned 100 years.

=== April ===
- 1 - In the final of season 9 of Denmark's X Factor, the sister duo Embrace emerge winners, obtaining 60% of the public vote.

=== June ===
- 1 – The 18th Distortion festival started in Copenhagen (June 1–5).
- 25 - Roskilde Festival 2016 opens (June 25 - July 2).

=== July ===
- 3 - Copenhagen Jazz Festival 2016 is opened (July 3–12).
- 14 – G! Festival opened in Göta, Eysturoy, Faroe Islands (July 14–17), with a line-up including Songhoy Blues, Lucy Rose, Federspiel and the Hot 8 Brass Band.

== Album and Singles releases ==
=== February ===
Day	Album	Artist	Label	Notes	Ref.
19	Grasque	Choir of Young Believers	Ghostly International		
26	We Survive	Medina	Labelmade/We Love Music/Universal	Produced by Pitchshifters, Stannard, Howes, Gill	

=== February ===
Day	Album	Artist	Label	Notes	Ref.
19	Grasque	Choir of Young Believers	Ghostly International/Tigerspring		
26	We Survive	Medina	Labelmade/We Love Music/Universal		

=== March ===
Day	Album	Artist	Label	Notes	Ref.
18	Reckless Twin	Mads Langer	Sony Music/Mr Radar		

=== April ===
Day	Album	Artist	Label	Notes	Ref.
15	Closer	Christopher	EMI		

=== June ===
Day	Album	Artist	Label	Notes	Ref.
3	Seal the Deal & Let's Boogie	Volbeat	Vertigo/Universal	Produced by Jacob Hansen, Michael Poulsen, Rob Caggiano	

=== August ===
Day	Album	Artist	Label	Notes	Ref.
26	The Map of Your Life	Simon Lynge	EMI	Natural Machine Recordings	

=== September ===
Day	Album	Artist	Label	Notes	Ref.
23	Streams	Jakob Bro	ECM	Produced by Manfred Eicher	

== Deaths ==
January

- 18 – Else Marie Pade, Danish composer (born 1924).

February

- 20 – Ove Verner Hansen, Danish opera singer and actor (born 1932).

June

- 27 – Pelle Gudmundsen-Holmgreen, Danish conductor (born 1932).

July

- 18 – Karina Jensen (77), singer (Cartoons) (cancer).

== See also ==
- Music of Denmark
- Denmark in the Eurovision Song Contest 2016
