= Veronika (TV series) =

- Genre: Crime drama Psychological thriller
- Created by: Katja Juras, Anna Lindblom
- Written by: Katja Juras, Anna Lindblom
- Directed by: Jonas Alexander Arnby
- Starring: Alexandra Rapaport; Tobias Santelmann; Arvin Kananian; Sarah Rhodin; Eddie Eriksson Dominguez
- Music by: Mikkel Hess
- Country of origin: Sweden
- Original language: Swedish
- No. of seasons: 3
- No. of episodes: 20

Production
- Executive producers: Katja Juras; Sara Askelöf; Helena Larand; Alexandra Rapaport; Jonas Alexander Arnby; Anna Ströman Lindblom
- Producers: Calle Jansson, Mathias Gruffma
- Cinematography: Niels Thastum
- Running time: 45 minutes
- Production company: Viaplay

Original release
- Release: 1 March 2024 – present

Veronika is a 2024 Swedish psychological thriller crime drama television series, which was developed by Viaplay. It was streamed on Viaplay's Australian partners SBS on Demand from 1 March 2024 and across Europe on SkyShowtime from 24 March. Veronika had been due for streaming in Scandinavia from late 2023 but was delayed due to downsizing by Viaplay. The eight-episode series was created by Katja Juras and Anna Lindblom, who also co-wrote its screenplay. Veronika was directed by Jonas Alexander Arnby. The titular protagonist Veronika, portrayed by Alexandra Rapaport, is a small town policewoman, who has a pill addiction which suppresses her psychic visions. Her husband Tomas (Tobias Santelmann) is the local music teacher and primary carer for their children Liv (Sarah Rhodin) and Simon (Eddie Eriksson Dominguez). When Veronika sees the dead boy Oskar's image, she begins to doubt her sanity. She finds a young woman, Hanna's corpse and assists in the associated murder investigation led by police detective Nassir (Arvin Kananian).

== Premise ==
Action is set in a fictitious central Swedish mining town of Älvsbruk, c.2022. Policewoman Veronika has psychic visions but has suppressed them since childhood by taking prescription pills. Periodically her visions have provoked nightmares and traumatic breakdowns. When Veronika sees a dead boy, Oskar, in a river she believes its a hallucination. Her long-suffering husband, Tomas is frustrated by her apparent indifference to their family's problems with their son, Simon's attention-seeking behaviour and teenage daughter, Liv's misbehaviour when her swimming aspirations are thwarted. Veronika discovers Hanna's corpse and sees the young woman in a vision. Police detective Nassir works with Veronika on Hanna's murder case. Initially they consider popular ice hockey champion Alexander as their suspect. Alexander is arrested when his alibi proves falsified by his team and coach. Veronika begins to doubts Alexander's guilt when she has visions of another murdered young woman, Josefin. Josefin's case was closed earlier as a pedophile confessed to her murder. Veronika finds Hanna wore a butterfly necklace and kept a diary, which mentions another man, "T".

After being hypnotised, Veronika better remembers her father, Bengt, including his death. She tracks down her child psychologist who admits to being bribed by Veronika's mother, Ann-Charlotte to sedate her. Veronika's visions sharpen when she stops taking pills. She has a vision of Oskar losing his gumboot in the forest near Hanna's corpse location. After learning Josefin also wore a butterfly necklace, Veronika aligns the deaths of Oskar, Hanna and Josefin. They had occurred during the times that Veronika was hospitalised for her breakdowns. Ann-Charlotte and Tomas are worried that Veronika is heading toward another breakdown by delving into her past. Tomas confronts Veronika when he finds her unprofessional investigations at home. She explains having her psychic visions. Despite professing that he believes her, Tomas calls the hospital for assistance. Veronika drives off distraught, has another vision of Josefin and crashes into a tree. Suspecting attempted suicide, Veronika is committed to the psychiatric ward and sedated by hospital staff. She convinces Nassir to recover her material and to follow up on Oskar's gumboot, Hanna and Josefin's necklaces and Hanna's diary.

== Cast and characters ==
=== Main cast ===
- Alexandra Rapaport as Veronika Gren (née Löef): Tomas's wife, uniform policewoman, has psychic visions but suppresses them via insomnia pills
- Tobias Santelmann as Tomas: Veronika's husband, their children's primary carer, music teacher
- Arvin Kananian as Nassir Hakim: newly transferred police detective, investigates Hanna's murder
- Sarah Rhodin as Liv: Veronika and Tomas's teenage daughter, swim team aspirant
- Eddie Eriksson Dominguez as Simon: Veronika and Tomas's son, has attention deficit hyperactivity disorder (ADHD)

=== Additional cast ===
- Per Graffman as Martin: Oskar's father, Ivar's son, swimming coach
- Anders Mossling as Göran: police chief, Veronika and Nassir's boss
- Emelie Garbers as Katrin: Martin's wife, Oskar's mother, senses that Veronika knows about Oskar
- Olle Sarri as Tommy Sand: Sara's drunken abusive husband, Agnes's father, sometime welder
- Adrian Macéus as Jack: Liv's contemporary, swim team member
- Chatarina Larsson as Ann-Charlotte: Veronika's mother, Bengt's widow, bribed child psychologist to sedate Veronika
- Thea Gotensjö as Hanna Hagman: 16-year-old murder victim, disappeared in October 2017. Owned a butterfly necklace
- Ralf Beck as Klas: uniform policeman, Veronika's colleague
- Elvira Björkman as Agnes: Tommy and Sara's daughter, Liv's contemporary, swim team member
- Isabelle Aronsson as Unga Veronika (English: Young Veronika): 6-year-old child, Bengt and Ann-Charlotte's daughter
- Sam Herrgård as Oskar Lidman: 9-year-old child, drowned in October 2017
- Freddie Mosten-Jacob as Julia: Josefin's friend, horse stable worker for Anita
- Karin Bertling as Ninni: Veronika's aunt, aged care resident, has memory lapses
- Isac Calmroth as Alexander Östberg: ice hockey player, Hanna's clandestine lover
- Oldoz Javidi as Susanne Kilström: psychotherapist, treats Tomas and Veronika
- Arvid Sand as Love Gran: library assistant, claims to be Hanna's best friend
- Marcus von Plenker-Tind as Bengt Löef: Veronkia's father, miner, supposed accidental death in 1984, Veronika was six
- Ellen Helinder as Bonnie: restaurant-bar attendant
- Elisabeth Wernesjö as Lotta: policewoman, partnered with Rasmus
- Alexander Salzberger as Dan: Simon's teacher
- Wilma Lidén as Josefin Forss: Anita's 14-year-old daughter, horse rider, murder victim, died in March 2019; Niklas convicted. Owned a butterfly necklace
- Joel Ödmann as Rasmus: policeman, partnered with Lotta
- Moses Ternedal as Leo: Liv's contemporary, swim team member
- Mille Bostedt as Sofia: uniform policewoman
- Alexandra Alegren as Sandra: Hanna's mother
- Sandra Herlog as Sara: Tommy's wife, domestic violence victim
- Louise Ryme as Anita Forss: Josefin's mother, owns horses
- Sanna Ekman as Marie: aged care attendant
- Sten Ljunggren as Ivar: Martin and Monica's father, former factory owner, Bengt's boss, aged care resident
- Molly Persson as Molly: Liv's friend
- Hannes Meidal as Niklas Borsén: convicted pedophile of pre-teen victims, convicted of Josefin's murder
- Matilda Tjerneld as Unga Ann-Charlotte (English: Young Ann-Charlotte): Veroonika's mother
- Malin Alm as Inger: Simon's school principal, Dan's boss
- Baxter Renman as Petter: Simon's contemporary, school student

== Production ==
Viaplay Group's Filippa Wallestam announced the production of Veronika in September 2022 with its streaming proposed for late 2023 by Viaplay. The series was created by Katja Juras and Anna Lindblom (Gåsmamman [2015]), who also co-wrote the screenplay. Veronika is directed by Jonas Alexander Arnby (War of the Worlds [2019]). Filming occurred in Dannemora, Gimo, Österbybruk and Gysinge. Its titular leading actress Alexandra Rapaport had been attracted to the project five years earlier, "It's a great script with a tone all of its own". It was streamed on Viaplay's Australian partners, SBS On Demand from 1 March 2024. Due to Viaplay's downsizing during mid-2023 the project was acquired by SkyShowtime, which streamed the eight-episode series across Europe from 24 March 2024. Rapaport is an executive producer of Veronika alongside Calle Jansson and Mathias Gruffman.

== Episodes ==
| No. in season | Title | Directed by | Written by | Original release date |
|---|---|---|---|---|
| 1 | "The Boy in the River" | Jonas Alexander Arnby | Katja Juras, Anna Ströman Lindblom | 1 March 2024 |
Veronika dreams: walking toward large tree; upon waking its 05:55. Tomas takes Simon and Liv to school. Veronika consumes pills; drives to police station. Veronika and Klas attend domestic dispute between Tommy and Sara. Sara confirms accidentally hit head on cupboard. Tomas to Suzanne: Veronika's disinterested to himself and their children. Veronika admits to having nightmares. Simon describes his video game. Liv tries talking but Simon interrupts. Veronika explains to Simon about waiting his turn. Veronika dreams: Young Veronika sees clock: its 5:55. Liv joins Tomas and Simon, who are fishing. Veronika carries net towards them but sees Oskar under water, falls onto rock. At hospital, Tomas updates Ann about Veronika, who stays overnight. Veronika asks Liv to bring toiletries bag. She has more visions, wakes at usual time. Martin coaches Liv's team. When Tomas did not bring her bag, Veronika leaves hospital. At home, her pills are gone. Veronika claims she has to buy soap. Pharmacist says her pill prescription has expired. Veronika collects pills from work. Göran introduces new detective, Nassir. Tomas puts Simon to sleep, leaves Veronika on couch. Upon waking Veronika sees Oskar outside, he disappears. Inside, she discovers class photo, including Oskar.
| 2 | "The Girl in the Forest" | Jonas Alexander Arnby | Katja Juras, Anna Ströman Lindblom | 1 March 2024 |
Veronika dreams: large tree; Young Veronika sees Bengt. Veronika reads about Oskar's drowning; she had been on sick leave. At school, Simon urinates in hallway. He scuffles with teasing bully. Tomas instructs singing class, when he's called away. Klas describes how Oskar fell off bridge into river. Veronika and Tomas attend meeting with Simon's teachers. Teachers propose ADHD assessment for Simon. Tomas disagrees. Outside, Veronika believes Simon should be assessed. Martin coaches swimmers with Liv, Agnes and Jack. Veronika takes Simon to see Ninni. Tomas advises Simon to ignore bullies. Tomas to Susanne: he's always shouldering responsibilities; implies Simon's behaviour relates to Veronika's indifference. Tomas concerned of repetition of Veronika's breakdowns. Veronika and her dog discover corpse. Nassir notes careful burial: killer cared about victim. Veronika drops Liv at pool. Veronika sees Hanna inside, who disappears. Veronika asks doctor for more pills. Göran describes corpse: woman about 18, strangled, buried about four years ago. Nassir checks dental records. Love argues with Sofia, Veronika intercedes and alerts Nassir. Love describes Hanna's disappearance five years ago, at same time Oskar drowned. Veronika recognises Hanna's photo. Love says Hanna was afraid of Alex. Veronika has vision of Oskar held under water.
| 3 | "The Man in the Dream" | Jonas Alexander Arnby | Katja Juras, Anna Ströman Lindblom | 1 March 2024 |
Tomas reminds Veronika of children's holiday, soon. Young Veronika sees Bengt as a miner. Hanna's corpse identified. Göran directs Nassir and Veronika to investigate. Nassir informs Hanna's parents. Her mother provides Hanna's goodbye letter and effects. Malin collects Simon for party; asks whether Tomas remembers Hanna. Veronika and Nassir meet Alexander with fiancée. Alexander denies relationship with Hanna. Veronika notices Hanna's butterfly necklace. Malin phones Tomas: there's been fighting, pick up Simon. Veronika to Katrin: denies knowledge of Oskar. Suzanne considers Veronika's dreams reflect unresolved issues. Veronika rejects Suzanne's hypnosis suggestion. Ann refuses to answer Veronika's queries about her child psychologist. Martin advises Liv: greater focus while swimming. Liv complains to Tomas that Veronika's behaving weird, again. Veronika researches Bengt's death, recognises his photo from her dreams. Ninni denies that Bengt accidentally died. Veronika visits Tomas as his class ends. Tomas's concerned about Liv's changing behaviour. Hanna's friends direct Nassir's attention to Love. Veronika's computer switches itself on, displays Josefin's file. Veronika sees Josefin's vision. Love reiterates that Alexander and Hanna had sex. Veronika's records show she was hospitalised when Oskar, Hanna and Josefin died. Veronika agrees to hypnosis: Young Veronika and Ann attend Bengt's funeral. Veronika sees Bengt's vision.
| 4 | "The Hypnosis" | Jonas Alexander Arnby | Katja Juras, Anna Ströman Lindblom | 1 March 2024 |
Veronika lies awake; sees Bengt as a miner. Veronika frightened by seeing Josefin in supermarket. Sofia places Josefin's printout on Veronika's desk. Veronika misses Tomas and Simon's meeting with Dan. Veronika raises Josefin's death with Nassir, it's discarded as significant due to Nicklas's conviction. Nassir displays Alexander and Hanna's sex video. Simon returns to class. Nassir interrogates Alexander with lawyer. Alexander lied because fiancée was present. He had sex with Hanna in cabin near corpse location but denies killing Hanna. Ice hockey coach claims Alexander was at game when Hanna disappeared, despite his not playing. Veronika notices that Nassir's superstitious. Liv leaves to stay-over with Molly. Veronika collects Simon from visiting with Ninni. Liv and Molly ride with motorcyclists to party with friends. They drink alcohol. Jack tries kissing Liv but she vomits and staggers away. Martin phones Veronika to collect Liv. Katrin senses that Veronika sees Oskar. Veronika returns Liv home. Tomas blames Martin's removing Liv from team for misbehaviour. Tommy denies treatments by child psychologist, but messages Sten's details. Woman reveals Tomas taught Hanna. Göran: no incriminating evidence at cabin. Veronika recalls Sten's consultations; he admits sedating her at Ann's behest. Veronika's vision: standing in blood.
| 5 | "The Seance" | Jonas Alexander Arnby | Katja Juras, Anna Ströman Lindblom | 1 March 2024 |
Ann admits to medicating Veronika until she left home; claims medications stopped hallucinations, resulted in happy life with Tomas and children. Ann received payout from Ivar after Bengt's work accident. Veronika throws pills away. At home, she starts private investigation into Oskar, Hanna and Josefin's deaths. Julia and Anita doubt that Josefin knew Alexander. Veronika asks about Josefin's butterfly necklace, which Julia wears. Neither knows who gave it to Josefin. Martin returns Liv to team. Veronika takes sick leave. Nassir returns to Alexander's cabin; then checks ice hockey practice. When Veronika inquires, Niklas admits killing Josefin, who lied about her maturity. Nassir interviews Alexander's teammate Johan. Tomas prepares dinner; Ann bought Simon new shoes. Ann concerned about Veronika's health when delving into past issues. Tomas asks Veronika what she's up to. At night, Veronika sees Tomas smoking. Göran warns Veronika to follow Nassir's lead, not interviewing Anita. Johan confirms Alexander did not attend game. Alexander kept in overnight. When visiting Ninni, Veronika sees Martin with his father, Ivar. Tomas fills out Simon's ADHD parent assessment. Veronika and Katrin try contacting Oskar but she sees Young Veronika instead. Veronika's vision: Oskar leaves gumboot after observing man struggling with Hanna.
| 6 | "The Diary" | Jonas Alexander Arnby | Katja Juras, Anna Ströman Lindblom | 1 March 2024 |
Veronika searches Hagmans' barn, takes Hanna's diary. Veronika reads that Hanna wants to use Alex as protection from "T". Sandra and Dan conclude Simon does not have ADHD but anxious about Veronika's safety. Veronika deduces that it was Tomas's assessment, which described Simon's anxieties. Julia recalls that Josefin contacted someone online. Tomas discovers Veronika's clandestine investigation. Nassir and Veronika interrogate Alexander. Alexander admits he had sex with Hanna, same day she disappeared. When Veronika asks, Alexander did not give Hanna any necklace. Nassir's annoyed by Veronika's questioning; sends her home. Katrin refuses to try contacting Oskar again. Göran tells Nassir about Veronika's previous breakdowns. Tomas queries Veronika about her investigation, she does not answer. She has further visions of Josefin. Veronika explains her visions to Tomas. Tomas humours her but calls hospital. Veronika drives away. When Josefin appears in her car, Veronika swerves and crashes into tree. Doctor calls Tomas to Veronika's hospital bedside. Tomas describes Veronika as confused before she left home. Ann agrees that Veronika's had delusions of seeing dead people, before. Tomas does not believe Veronika. Veronika requests Nassir to visit; she outlines her clandestine investigation, mentions Hanna's diary, Oskar's gumboot. Orderlies take Veronika to psychiatry ward.
| 7 | "T" | Jonas Alexander Arnby | Katja Juras, Anna Ströman Lindblom | 1 March 2024 |
Veronika dreams: Liv's near big tree. Upon waking, Veronika panics and is sedated. Nassir researches Oskar's drowning. Göran congratulates Nassir on Alexander's arrest. Tomas allows Nassir collect Veronika's investigation. Liv and Agnes prepare for swimming. Doctor informs Veronika she's been committed according to Swedish statutes. Veronika argues she did not attempt suicide. Nassir confirms Hanna loved Alexander and was afraid of "T". He interviews Niklas; determines Niklas confessed to murder to gain notoriety. Veronika pretends to take pills; asks for Susanne. Nassir finds Oskar's gumboot in forest, near river. Susanne resumes Veronika's hypnosis. Veronika sees Young Veronika trying to stop Bengt from going to work. Nassir questions how Veronika knows Hanna and Oskar's details. Veronika was hospitalised, at that time, because she had frightening visions since childhood. Nassir has Veronika discharged. They need to discover whoever gave victims their necklaces and who is "T". Anita remembers Josefin in town choir. Veronika confronts Tomas about teaching both Hanna and Josefin. He repudiates her implication; orders her to leave. Veronika sleeps at Ninni's. Ann's afraid of Veronika; they argue over Veronika's foreknowledge of Bengt's death at 5:55. Veronika collects Liv at pool; Veronika sees Hanna's swim team photo. Tommy arrives to collect Agnes.
| 8 | "The Victim" | Jonas Alexander Arnby | Katja Juras, Anna Ströman Lindblom | 1 March 2024 |
Veronika details her premonitions to Nassir. She dreams while with Ninni: Liv enters shower, when Veronika finishes brushing teeth, Liv's asleep in her bed. Mechanic Paul confirms that Tommy welded at stables, March 2019. Göran stops Nassir questioning Tommy as case's closed. Nassir tails Tommy into forest. Veronika sees Bengt at Hanna's funeral. She visits Ivar, observes Monica's photo: she wears butterfly necklace. Ivar recalls Bengt said Martin raped Monica. Monica committed suicide. Veronika has successive visions: Ivar killed Bengt; Martin watches Josefin singing, coaches Hanna, runs after Oskar. Veronika messages Nassir: "T" for trainer: Martin. Nassir drives towards town. Liv ignores Veronika's calls, leaves Molly, enters Martin's car. Tomas to Veronika: Liv at Molly's. Martin has Liv practice turns. She wears butterfly necklace. Katrin: Martin at pool; Molly: Liv at practice. Martin's grooming Liv. She runs away to hide; Martin stalks Liv. Veronika smashes pool door. Martin chokes Liv as Veronika approaches. She tries to talk him down, lunges at him. They fight, Martin starts drowning Veronika but Liv hits him with an extinguisher. Martin dies in pool. Veronika types report; Nassir: do not mention Josefin. Liv's recovering. Simon and Veronika talk with Ninni; they learn Ninni died previous evening.
