= Heder (TV series) =

Swedish television show

- Genre: Crime; Drama; Thriller
- Created by: Sofia Helin; Alexandra Rapaport; Julia Dufvenius; Anja Lundqvist
- Written by: Richard Holm; Jimmy Lindgren; Olof Spaak; Inger Scharis
- Directed by: Richard Holm; Manuel Concha; Olof Spaak; Anette Sidor; Joakim Eliasson
- Music by: Anders Herrlin; Jennie Löfgren
- Country of origin: Sweden
- Original language: Swedish
- No. of seasons: 3
- No. of episodes: 24

Production
- Executive producer: Jon Petersson
- Cinematography: Nea Asphäll; Olof Johnson
- Running time: 44 minutes
- Production companies: Bigster; Nordic Entertainment Group

Original release
- Network: Viaplay
- Release: 13 August 2019 – 2022

Heder (English: Honour) is a Swedish television series based on an idea by Sofia Helin, starring Alexandra Rapaport, Anja Lundqvist, Julia Dufvenius and Eva Röse that follows four lawyers fighting violence against women.

In June 2021, the series was renewed for a third season, which is set to premiere on Viaplay in 2022.

In December 2021, it was reported that an American remake of the series titled Honor, is in development at NBC. The project will be produced by Carol Mendelsohn Productions and Universal Television with Carol Mendelsohn and Maria Bello as executive producers.
