= Fallen (2023 TV series) =

Swedish six-part TV series

- Promotional poster
- Swedish: Sanningen
- Genre: Serial crime thriller
- Created by: Camilla Ahlgren; Martin Asphaug; Alex Haridi
- Written by: Camilla Ahlgren; Martin Asphaug; Alex Haridi
- Starring: Sofia Helin; Hedda Stiernstedt; Håkan Bengtsson; Kajsa Ernst
- Composer: Sophia Ersson
- Country of origin: Sweden
- Original language: Swedish
- No. of seasons: 2
- No. of episodes: 12

Production
- Executive producers: Lisa Dahlberg; Wolfgang Feindt; Hanne Palmquist; Joakim Rang Strand
- Producers: Anna Wallmark; Olof Spaak
- Production locations: Malmö; Ystad
- Production companies: Nimbus Film; Filmlance International

Original release
- Network: TV4
- Release: 25 December 2023 – present

Fallen (Sanningen) is a Swedish six-part TV series starring Sofia Helin. It first aired on TV4 on 25 December 2023, and has since been distributed to several other countries. Season 2 premiered in Sweden on 25 December 2025, followed by a third-season renewal.

== Synopsis ==
The recently widowed police officer Iris Broman travels from Stockholm to Ystad in southern Sweden, where she will reside in her sister's home while taking up the new position of leading the cold case unit in Malmö. A body is found and there is an unsolved murder from over 10 years ago, and Broman also has to deal with her personal trauma and complex relationship with her sister, Kattis. Kattis is married to a French man and her children are bilingual, while Broman has no children and no desire to have any.

== Cast ==
- Sofia Helin as Iris Broman
- Hedda Stiernstedt as Kattis
- Håkan Bengtsson as Jens
- Kajsa Ernst as Kerstin
- Hanna Ullerstam as Hillevi
- Peter Gardiner as Christian

== Production ==
The series was produced for commercial Swedish TV channel TV4 and streaming service C More, in partnership with Germany's public broadcaster ZDF.

From 2011 until 2018, Sofia Helin was lead actor and Camilla Ahlgren lead writer of the Danish-Swedish co-production The Bridge, and their partnership is renewed in Fallen, with Ahlgren as co-creator and lead writer and Helin in the lead role. Other writers on Fallen were Norwegian filmmaker Martin Asphaug and Alex Haridi. Ahlgen remained involved in the production, including viewing all the dailies doing rewrites where necessary. She wanted to show the stark contrast between the city and country scenery. However, the tone is lighter, and the lead character very distinct from The Bridge.

As of February 2024, financing was being arranged for a second season, by TV4, Germany's ZDF, and Film i Skåne, which Ahlgren had already started writing.

== Release ==
Sanningen premiered on 25 December 2023 on TV4 in Sweden.

The series was aired from 25 February 2024 in Germany, and after Banijay obtained distribution rights, the series was bought by American broadcaster MHz Choice, Canal+'s Polar+ for France, NPO in the Netherlands, SBS in Australia, ERT in Greece, and Syn Hf in Iceland. All episodes dropped on SBS on Demand in Australia on 4 April 2024.

== Reception ==
=== Viewership ===
In Sweden, the final episode of season 1 attracted around 1.1 million viewers (10% of the Swedish population).
