= SSHL =

SSHL may refer to:

- Sigtunaskolan Humanistiska Läroverket, a boarding school in Sweden
- Sudden sensorineural hearing loss
- Saskatchewan Senior Hockey League, a defunct Canadian amateur ice hockey league
