= Tanja Bergkvist =

Swedish mathematician (born 1974)

Tanja-Helena Dessislava Bergkvist (born 3 January 1974 in Lund) is a Swedish mathematician and blogger. She earned a Ph.D. in mathematics in 2007 at Stockholm University, and has served as a professor at the KTH Royal Institute of Technology, Uppsala University, and the Sigtunaskolan Humanistiska Läroverket. She has also worked as a researcher at the Swedish Defence Research Agency. She has gained notoriety for her conservative approach towards gender studies.
