= Maria Sundbom =

Swedish actress (born 1975)

Maria Irene Sundbom (born 1975) is a Swedish actress. She belongs to the ensemble of Uppsala City Theatre. She was born in 1975 in Uppsala.

== Filmography ==
- 2005 - Lasermannen (TV series)
- 2006 - LasseMajas detektivbyrå (TV series)
- 2007 - Solstorm
- 2009 - Barbieblues
- 2009 - Maskeraden
- 2011 - Bron (TV)
- 2019 - Quicksand (Netflix Series)
- 2020 - Dejta (TV)
