= Saga Norén =

Fictional character in the Danish/Swedish series The Bridge

- Saga Norén as played by Sofia Helin
- First appearance: Season 1 Episode 1
- Last appearance: Season 4 Episode 8
- Created by: Hans Rosenfeldt
- Portrayed by: Sofia Helin
- Quote: "Saga Norén, Länskrim Malmö" ('Saga Norén, CID Malmö', as Saga consistently introduces herself)

In-universe information
- Occupation: Police investigator
- Family: Gösta (father, deceased); Marie-Louise (mother, deceased); Jennifer (sister, deceased)
- Significant others: Jakob Sandberg (ex-boyfriend); Henrik Sabroe (lover)

Saga Norén is a fictional character and protagonist of the Danish/Swedish TV series The Bridge (Bron/Broen). She is played by Swedish actress Sofia Helin. Saga is introduced as a member of the Malmö County Police Department in the first episode of the series. Suggested, but never stated, as being autistic, she is portrayed as completely oblivious to social norms, but a brilliant and devoted police investigator.

In the first two series, she develops an unlikely friendship with Danish cop Martin Rohde (played by Kim Bodnia), who is in many ways her complete opposite. In the third series she has another Danish detective, Henrik Sabroe (played by Thure Lindhardt), as her partner, who understands her complex nature and accepts her for who she is. Lindhardt says, "Henrik is a man who has lost everything and he needs somebody like her who does not judge him."

== Concept and character creation ==
Saga Norén was initially created to be a counterpart to the Danish character Martin Rohde, himself intended to be the opposite of the standard lead male detective in the crime genre. "Kim's a middle-aged white male so we wanted to make him a little more emotional, a family man, and somebody who wants to small talk and chit-chat", says lead writer Hans Rosenfeldt. "He's a softer detective. So we did that and then thought, what are we going to put him against?" As Rohde was envisioned as very extroverted and friendly, Saga was written to be a woman completely lacking in social skills. "We knew we wanted a female detective on the Swedish side, and then we came up with the idea, what about a female detective with absolutely no social skills? She's brilliant in what she's doing, and everything that she can learn by reading, she will be excellent in, but everything else, when it comes to interaction between other people, she just can't get it."

Rosenfeldt has said that it was not the specific intention of the writers to create a character with Asperger's (as that aspect of the autism spectrum was then known), but many viewers came to interpret the character as autistic due to her emotionally detached tendencies and perception of the problems in the world around her. It has since been partially written into the series, when Henrik remarks on the possibility of Saga having a condition of some kind whilst talking to an imagined vision of his missing wife. "To me she has Asperger's", says actress Sofia Helin firmly.

Other facets of the character evolved gradually. It was Charlotte Sieling, the conceptual director, who conceived much of Saga's Norén's trademark look in collaboration with Sofia Helin. This includes her leather trousers, olive green military coat, and minimal use of makeup. "When I first read the script, I thought I should have short hair, but Charlotte said she'd read somewhere that it's "easier to get laid" if you have long hair. So we decided it should stay", Helin says.

Saga Norén's vintage Porsche 911, a 1977 911S Coupé (chassis no. 9117201496), is finished in Porsche color code 414, officially named "olive" in Porsche documentation. The color code is visible on the vehicle's original paint plate in auction photographs. The car was privately purchased by Elisabeth von Koch, in charge of props for the series, but was later sold to the production company in October 2012. It was imported into Sweden from San Francisco in 2009 and auctioned by Bonhams in 2018, with all proceeds going to WaterAid, selling for £141,500. The in-story origin of the car was only revealed very late in the series; in Series Four Saga says she won the car in a bet with a former school colleague, who had bet she could not graduate from the police academy. The school colleague is now the police commissioner in Stockholm.

== Characterization ==
The basic idea for Saga Norén was of a woman with absolutely no social skills. So from the very first episode she is defined by her bluntness, nearly always telling the truth even if it risks hurting or offending those she interacts with. While she is often seen as insensitive or rude to the characters around her for this reason, it is shown as unintentional. She approaches everything directly and logically, and often is oblivious to the fact that her blunt demeanor sometimes offends others, while her lack of showing empathy to people around her makes her somewhat unsuited to questioning the recently bereaved relatives of victims, but she sometimes tries to make amends when it is explained to her and is not a malicious character. Her boss, Hans Petterson - and later Martin - provides her with guidance in social scenarios. She is shown to have emotions and does care about those close to her, like Martin or Hans, but she expresses them differently. She rarely smiles, and walks with a stiff-backed gait.

Saga Norén's other defining traits are a strict adherence to rules, in her case the code of conduct for police officers, and a great level of devotion to her job and everything surrounding it. The first episode of the series establishes that she has a basic knowledge of forensic pathology, personally examining a murder victim and correctly identifying the cause of death. Her strong belief in following rules is also presented straight away in the series, when she files a report against Martin for having let an ambulance pass through a crime scene. It becomes a key source of conflict between the two characters, as he is shown to be more than willing to bend the rules from time to time. Over the course of the series, a key part of the character development for Saga is to learn to be more flexible and in the later series she is shown to break some rules on her own initiative.

She does not like physical contact, and noticeably stiffens whenever someone shows her physical affection or simply touches her. Unlike other character traits, this is explored in greater detail only later in the series, and quite extensively throughout the third series when several characters attempt to put an arm around her shoulders or embrace her. Saga is shown to be more likely to be comfortable around the people she trusts greatly, such as her boss Hans Petterson (whom she allows to hug her provided he asks first) and partner Henrik Sabroe, however when around someone who she deems to be an "outsider", or someone who she perceives to be a threat, she visibly retreats away from them, most notably in her encounters with her mother Louise.

=== Relationships ===
When she is first introduced, Saga has almost no personal life; her spare time is shown to be largely spent alone; she is seen reading a book in her apartment in the second episode, and several other episodes have her making references to things that she has read. It is shown that she partially uses books to try and better understand social conventions, often unsuccessfully. Due to Saga's devotion to police work, she does not have many out-of-work relationships, preferring one-night stands such as Anton from the first series and initially Henrik in series three. It is revealed later in the first series that she has always lived alone, except for a period when she lived with her younger sister. In the second series, she develops a relationship with a man named Jakob, who moves in with her. However, her difficulty in sharing her space and lack of experience in relationships proves a strain, and he eventually breaks up with her by the end of the second series. Instead, her closest relations are platonic: her sympathetic and supportive boss Hans Pettersson and eventually Martin Rohde, whom Saga refers to as her only friend in the series two finale. The friendship between Saga and Martin, despite their greatly different personalities, is a key focal point of the first two series of the show, with Martin often trying to teach Saga social rules to better cope with the people around her.

Throughout the third series, however, she develops a close bond with her new Danish partner, Henrik. While this initially consists of casual sex, it grows deeper and more emotional when he begins to seek her company in order to cope with his insomnia and loneliness, and in turn allowing her to stay at his house with him and providing her with emotional support when her beloved boss Hans dies, her manipulative mother returns to her life and her new boss proves less understanding, which makes her work harder. Henrik is shown as having an intuitive understanding of her personality and a great deal of respect for her boundaries. The fourth and final series focus on Saga's realization that she is falling in love with Henrik, but with the issue of children at risk of coming between them: while Henrik, whose key backstory involves the disappearance of his wife and daughters, considers being a father as a central part of his identity, Saga explicitly does not want to have children. The revelation of an accidental pregnancy complicates the relationship between the both of them, which is explored in Series 4.

Despite having few close relationships, Saga is generally liked and accepted by her colleagues, such as her team in series one and the Malmö pathologist, a recurring character. A subplot of the second series focus on her conflict with a new colleague, Rasmus, who does not like her, but this is presented as an exception. Even some characters who initially have difficulty working with her, such as her new boss Linn in series three, eventually warm to her.

== Character background ==
Little is known about Saga's background at first, although in the second series, Martin looks into her family history, discovering that her sister Jennifer committed suicide.

In the third series, her mother appears at her apartment, telling her that her father is on his deathbed, and wishes to see her. Saga refuses, but Marie-Louise persists in trying to rebuild their relationship. She later turns up at the police station with medical documents in hand which, upon inspection by the police mortician, appear to absolve Marie-Louise of blame in Jennifer's health problems (the mortician states that though Jennifer was often sick, no clear pattern of abuse is visible). Saga is skeptical, and continues to insist that as children she and her sister were both always getting sick as a result of her mother's Munchausen by Proxy. When Saga was financially able to live independently of her parents, she had them jailed on false sexual assault charges in order to get Jennifer away from them. Sometime later, when Jennifer was fourteen years old, she killed herself by leaping in front of an oncoming train, which is explored greatly and in more depth in the third series, in which Saga's relationship to her mother is rekindled and spirals out of control, with Marie-Louise committing suicide and framing her death as murder, with Saga being the likely culprit. It is initially unclear whether Jennifer's death was the direct result of Marie-Louise's abuse or (as Marie-Louise suggests) if it was Saga's inability to connect with the emotionally vulnerable teen which ultimately drove her to suicide, an uncertainty which assures - given Saga's knowledge of her own nature - that Jennifer's death and Saga's guilt for having failed to recognise the possibility continue to haunt Saga.

It is ultimately confirmed in the final season, after Saga being cleared of the charges of responsibility for her mother's death, that Jennifer's depression stemmed from medical abuse carried out by their mother under the influence of her mental illness. The timing of Jennifer's death caused her to abandon her career of becoming a microbiologist and instead pursue the role of a police officer in guilt to make up for her sister's untimely death, as suggested by her therapist. She subsequently gives up her work with the police and sets out to begin a new life.

== Reception ==
The role of Saga earned Sofia Helin considerable fame, both at home and abroad.
