= Ella Rappich =

Swedish actress (born 2000)

- Born: May 23, 2000 (age 25); Pretoria, South Africa
- Occupation: Actress
- Known for: Amanda in Quicksand

Ella Maria Eia Rappich (born 23 May 2000, in South Africa), is a Swedish actress.

Rappich grew up in Sigtuna, a suburb to Stockholm in Sweden, and got her first role by chance when the production company FLX visited her school. She made her debut by playing a close friend to the main character in Netflix's first Swedish-produced drama series Quicksand, which premiered on 5 April 2019. Alongside acting, Rappich attends Sigtunaskolan Humanistiska Läroverket in social science education.

== Filmography ==
- 2019 – Quicksand (TV series) as Amanda Steen
- 2020–2021 – Lyckoviken (TV series) as Vanessa
- 2021 – A Class Apart (TV series) as Grace
- 2022 - The Playlist (TV Series) as Sophia Bendz
