= Quicksand (TV series) =

Swedish psychology-crime drama television series

- Swedish: Störst av allt
- Genre: Crime drama; Teen drama; Thriller
- Created by: Pontus Edgren; Martina Håkansson
- Based on: Quicksand (Störst av allt) by Malin Persson Giolito
- Written by: Camilla Ahlgren
- Directed by: Per-Olav Sørensen: Lisa Farzaneh
- Starring: Hanna Ardéhn; Felix Sandman; William Spetz; Ella Rappich; David Dencik; Reuben Sallmander; Maria Sundbom; Rebecka Hemse; Arvid Sand; Helena af Sandeberg; Anna Björk
- Composer: Kristian Eidnes Andersen
- Country of origin: Sweden
- Original language: Swedish
- No. of seasons: 1
- No. of episodes: 6

Production
- Executive producers: Pontus Edgren: Martina Håkansson; Joshua Mehr; Malin Persson Giolito; Tesha Crawford; Erik Barmack; Jennifer D. Breslow; Astri von Arbin Ahlander
- Producer: Fatima Varhos: Frida Asp
- Production locations: Sweden; Croatia
- Cinematography: Ulf Brantås
- Camera setup: Single-camera
- Running time: 41–49 minutes
- Production company: FLX

Original release
- Network: Netflix
- Release: 5 April 2019

Quicksand (Swedish: Störst av allt, lit. 'Greatest of all') is a Swedish psychology-crime drama television series, based on the 2016 novel of the same name by Malin Persson Giolito. The first season, consisting of six episodes, was released on 5 April 2019 on Netflix and is its first Swedish-language series. The series stars Hanna Ardéhn, Felix Sandman, William Spetz, Ella Rappich, David Dencik, Reuben Sallmander, Maria Sundbom, Rebecka Hemse, Arvid Sand, Helena af Sandeberg and Anna Björk.

The series was commissioned in 2017 following the immense popularity of Giolito's novel.

== Synopsis ==
A school shooting takes place at Djursholm senior high school. At the age of 18, Maja Norberg is arrested and suspected of murder, while her ex-boyfriend, Sebastian "Sibbe" Fagerman, is dead at the scene. Maja admits the murder at an early stage but denies the crime – the trial is rather about why the murder was committed than whether it was committed.

Like in the novel, the story is told from Maja's perspective, with events flashing back and forth between the present day and her memories of events that led up to the shooting. The six-episode series answers the main question concerning the extent of her complicity: As the only student left alive after the shooting, did she conspire with her boyfriend who planned the attack or is she an innocent bystander? Fagerman dying leaves Maja as the sole focus of international media attention.

Quicksand is not based on a real-life event but the story was written to reflect real-life class inequalities that its creators saw in Sweden.

== Cast ==
=== Main ===
- Hanna Ardéhn as Maja Norberg
- Felix Sandman as Sebastian "Sibbe" Fagerman
- William Spetz as Samir Said
- Ella Rappich as Amanda Steen
- David Dencik as Peder Sander
- Reuben Sallmander as Claes Fagerman
- Maria Sundbom as Lena Pärsson
- Rebecka Hemse as Jeanette Nilsson
- Arvid Sand as Lars-Gabriel "Labbe" Sager-Crona
- Helena af Sandeberg as Mimmi Steen
- Anna Björk as Camilla Norberg

=== Recurring ===
- Iris Herngren as Lina Norberg
- Kalled Mustonen as Kalle
- Marall Nasiri as Susse Zanjani
- Christopher Wollter as Erik Norberg
- Jeanette Holmgren as Mags
- Evin Ahmad as Evin Orak
- Alva Bratt as Mela
- Louise Edlind as Majlis
- Astrid Plynning as Sofie
- Vehid Abdullahi
- Suheib Saleh as Dennis
- Sebastian Sporsén as Per Jonsson
- Shanti Roney as Christer
- Moa Lindström as classmate, funeral visitor and club visitor.
- Tom Boustedt as classmate
- Savannah Hanneryd as club visitor
- Ray Nordin as club visitor

== Episodes ==
| No. | Title | Directed by | Written by | Original release date |
|---|---|---|---|---|
| 1 | "Maja" | Per-Olav Sørensen | Camilla Ahlgren | 5 April 2019 |
After a school shooting, Maja Norberg, 18, is arrested by the authorities as a prime suspect and accomplice of a crime (murder, attempted murder, and murder accomplice) committed in a classroom. She meets her lawyer Peder Sander and recounts the story of the events that led to the school shooting, starting from the very beginning when she first encountered her ex-boyfriend, Sebastian Fagerman. In a flashback, scenes depict Maja and Sebastian spending the previous summer together on a luxurious ship in France, owned by Sebastian's father, Claes Fagerman. Sebastian talks to Maja about the background of his family. In the present, Maja conducts her first interrogation in the district court, where she explains her recollection of the school shooting. A detention hearing is held in which Maja is declared arrested with full restrictions.
| 2 | "Custody" | Per-Olav Sørensen | Camilla Ahlgren and Veronica Zacco | 5 April 2019 |
Jeanette Nilsson, the criminal inspector, continues to interrogate Maja about her former relationship with Sebastian. Maja recalls past events, starting from the beginning, where her relationship with the deceased culprit was burgeoning. She mentions a wild party that Sebastian organized at the beginning of the school year. Amanda gets together with Labbe in a flashback scene, and Sebastian introduces Maja to his rich friends and drug dealer. After some heavy drinking, Samir ends up arguing with Maja and storms off from the party. Maja and Sebastian later leave the party. Sebastian lets her drive his father's luxury car, which she ends up crashing. This leads Claes, Sebastian's father, who thinks Sebastian was driving the car at the time of the incident, to abuse Sebastian as punishment physically. Sometime later, Maja and Sebastian go hunting with Maja's grandfather. In the present, a hearing is conducted the following day, where the prosecutor participates.
| 3 | "The Funeral" | Per-Olav Sørensen | Camilla Ahlgren and Alex Haridi | 5 April 2019 |
On the day of Amanda's funeral, Maja requests to leave her cell for a temporary period. In addition, she asks her lawyer, Peder Sander, to bring in a portable media player with music on it to listen to it while the funeral is being held. Maja, Sebastian, and Samir are invited to Labbe's farm in a flashback scene. Later, Sebastian and Samir end up in a dispute over Samir's parents' occupations. Maja gets closer to Samir as Sebastian becomes more dismissive and arrogant. The following night, Maja and Sebastian end up at a club, where she later confronts Dennis and chastises him for continuing to supply drugs to Sebastian even though he can't handle them.
| 4 | "The Reconstruction" | Lisa Farzaneh | Camilla Ahlgren and Alex Haridi | 5 April 2019 |
Maja starts to strengthen her friendship with Samir, causing issues in her relationship with Sebastian. In the present, a reconstruction of the shooting is conducted. As Maja attempts to remember what really happened, she later fails to explain what she truly remembers from the school shooting. The preliminary investigation is completed, and the process enters the next phase. In a flashback scene, Maja hears news about Sebastian overdosing on drugs and makes her way to the hospital.
| 5 | "The Trial" | Per-Olav Sørensen | Camilla Ahlgren and Veronica Zacco | 5 April 2019 |
In a flashback scene, Sebastian is seen at the emergency room with Maja consoling him. When the trial begins, Maja - who faces fourteen years in prison - testifies how Claes behaved towards Sebastian and how her 18th birthday suddenly took a dark turn after Sebastian took a little too much drugs. In a flashback scene, Maja starts falling behind in her schoolwork to help Sebastian. Later, Maja and Sebastian are called into a meeting at the school. In the present, she testifies how Sebastian violently raped her, which the prosecutor doubts as she has never previously mentioned this.
| 6 | "The Witnesses" | Per-Olav Sørensen | Camilla Ahlgren | 5 April 2019 |
Sebastian's friend Labbe testifies to how Maja and Sebastian changed after their relationship began. Samir, an eyewitness to the incident, testifies that Sebastian arranged a party the night before the shooting. Sebastian's father arrived and physically assaulted his son. Maja texts Sebastian, stating that Claes should die. Sebastian kills his father the next morning but does not tell Maja. They head to the school meeting, where Sebastian brings out a rifle, kills Dennis and Christer and shoots Samir, who plays dead. Maja's lawyer proves that Samir could not have witnessed anything after that point, belying his remaining testimony about the final moments. Flashback confirms that: Sebastian then aimed at Maja; she grabbed a second gun Sebastian had brought; she fired at him but narrowly missed and (unaware) killed Amanda; then fired again, killing the threatening Sebastian. The District Court finds that Maja accidentally shot Amanda and killed Sebastian in self-defense, and she is acquitted.

== Production ==
=== Development ===
On 7 September 2017, it was announced that Netflix had given the production a series order for a first season. The series is created by Pontus Edgren and Martina Håkansson who are both credited as executive producers. In March 2019, it was confirmed that the series would premiere on 5 April 2019.

=== Casting ===
In July 2018, it was announced that Hanna Ardéhn, William Spetz, Felix Sandman, David Dencik, Reuben Sallmander, Anna Björk, Christopher Wollter, Evin Ahmad, Maria Sundbom, Rebecka Hemse, Helena af Sandeberg, Shanti Roney and Ella Rappich had been cast in the series.

=== Premiere ===
In February 2019, the series held its official premiere with the screening of the first two episodes at the Berlin International Film Festival in Berlin, Germany.

== Release ==
On 27 March 2019, the official trailer for the series was released. On 5 April 2019, the series had its release on Netflix.

== Reception ==
In a review of the premiere episode, Joel Keller from Decider described the film as a "pretty standard crime drama, albeit one that's pretty well-written."

=== Awards and nominations ===
Ardéhn won Best Actress at Kristallen 2019 for her performance as Maja.
