= The Same Sky (TV series) =

2017 TV series directed by Oliver Hirschbiegel

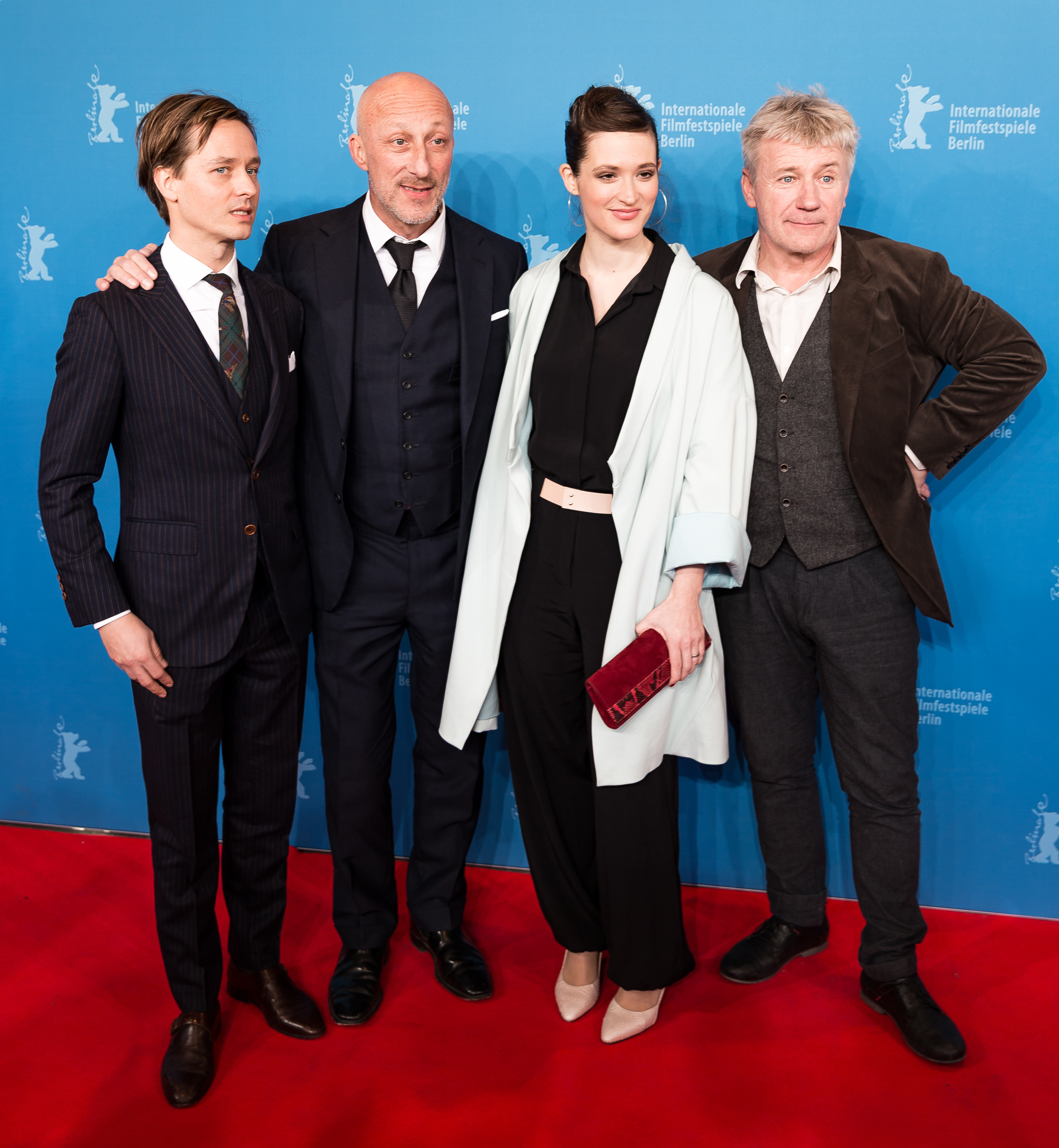
The actor Tom Schilling, Director Oliver Hirschbiegel, actress Friederike Becht and actor Jörg Schüttauf of The Same Sky at the Berlinale 2017

The Same Sky (original title: Der gleiche Himmel) is a 2017 German TV series. It is set during the 1970s in the divided city of Berlin, depicting the Cold War. It portrays the fate of two families on either side of the Berlin Wall. The story revolves around the relationship between an East German "Romeo" agent – a spy who uses seduction as a way to unearth secrets — and his female targets in the West.

The series was screened as three feature-length episodes or as six hour-long episodes, depending on the broadcasting service. It was written by Paula Milne and directed by Oliver Hirschbiegel and stars Sofia Helin and Tom Schilling. The scripts were written in English and translated into German by the director. The series was produced by UFA Fiction in co-production with Beta Film for ZDF and Czech TV in association with Rainmark Films. It was filmed from 24 August 2015 to 6 December 2015 in Prague. The music score was written by Walter Mair and Vesselina Tchakarova. The series was originally broadcast in Germany in March 2017. In the UK, the series was shown on More4 in 2020.

The interest by Amazon and Netflix in acquiring the rights to carry The Same Sky was kindled by the earlier success of another series also featuring a young agent dispatched to West Germany under an assumed identity, Deutschland 83.

== Cast ==
Tom Schilling	Lars Weber
Sofia Helin	Lauren Faber
Friederike Becht	Sabine Cutter
Ben Becker	Ralf Müller
Jörg Schüttauf	Gregor Weber
Hannes Wegener	Axel Lang
Stephanie Amarell	Klara Weber
Godehard Giese	Conrad Weber
Anja Kling	Gita Weber
Steven Brand	Howard Cutter
Claudia Michelsen	Dagmar Cutter
Daniel Zillmann	Tobias Preuss
Max Hopp	Wulf Dunst
Daniel Krejcík	Viktor
Christian Kuchenbuch	Olaf Bargmann
Steffi Kühnert	Erika Haas
Torsten Michaelis	Acker König
Christian Näthe	Florian Eberhardt
Richard Pepper	Duncan March
Uwe Preuss	Meyer
Jascha Rust	Emil Faber
Udo Schenk	Lutz Janson
Muriel Wimmer	Juliane Weber
