= Alexandra Rapaport =

Swedish actress (born 1971)

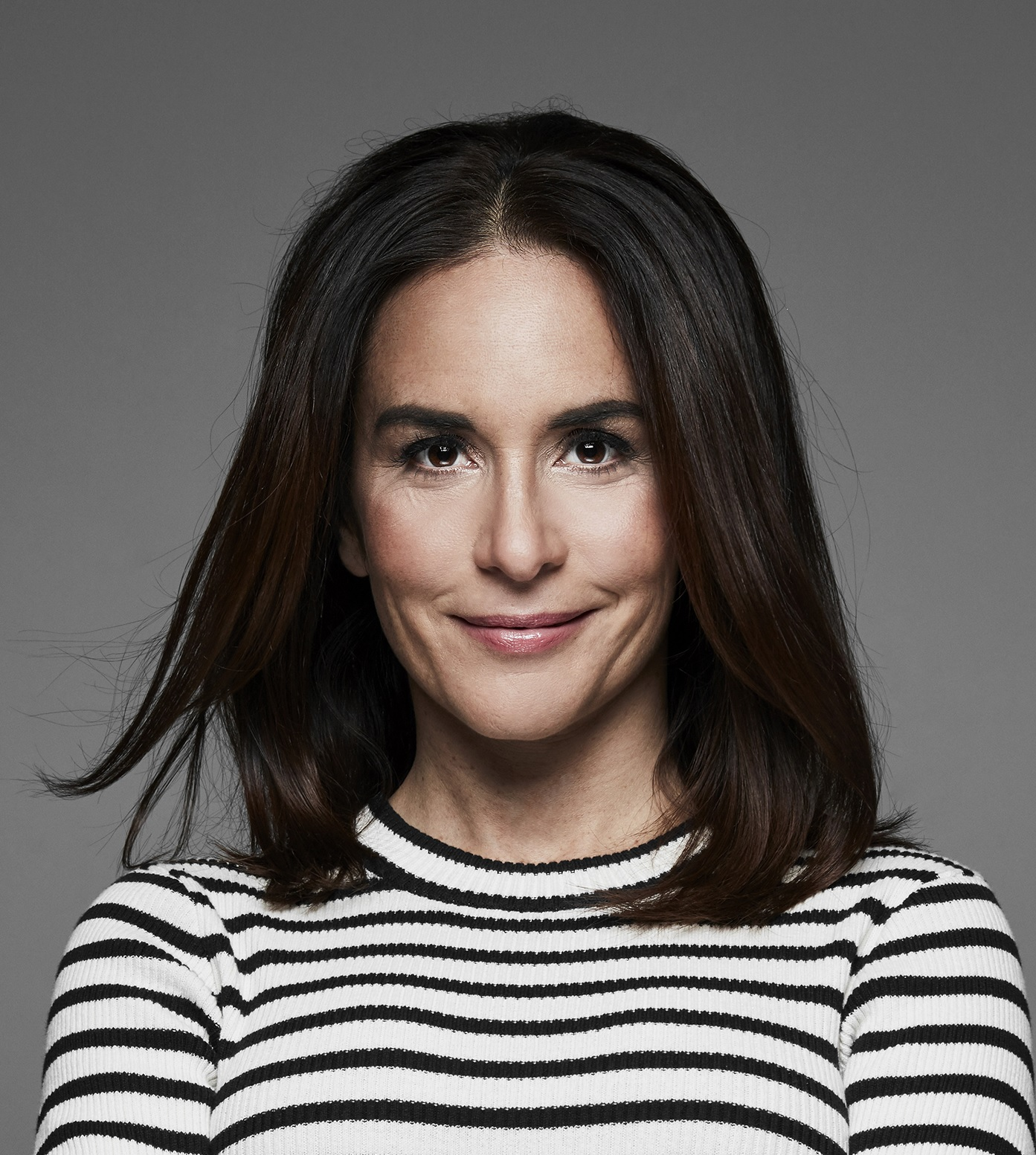
- Rapaport in 2015
- Born: Alexandra Susanna Rapaport; 26 December 1971 (age 54); Bromma, Sweden
- Education: Stockholm Theater Academy
- Occupation: Actress
- Years active: 1996–present
- Spouse: Joakim Eliasson
- Children: 2

Alexandra Susanna Rapaport (born 26 December 1971) is a Swedish film and stage actress. She studied at the Teaterhögskolan i Stockholm, from which she graduated in 1997. She then worked for Uppsala Theatre before becoming engaged by the Royal Dramatic Theatre in Stockholm, where she is part of the permanent ensemble and has participated in a number of classic plays.

She has featured in more than 40 feature films and TV series, among them the crime series The Sandhamn Murders, Gåsmamman and Heder.

== Personal life ==
She was born on 26 December 1971 in Bromma. She graduated from the Stockholm Theater Academy in 1997.

Her father, Edmund Rapaport (1923–2020), was a Polish Jew who fled to Sweden during World War II and became a statistician. Her mother, Ewa Rapaport (1938–1981), was an architect.

She and her husband, Joakim Eliasson, had a son in 2007 and a daughter in 2010.

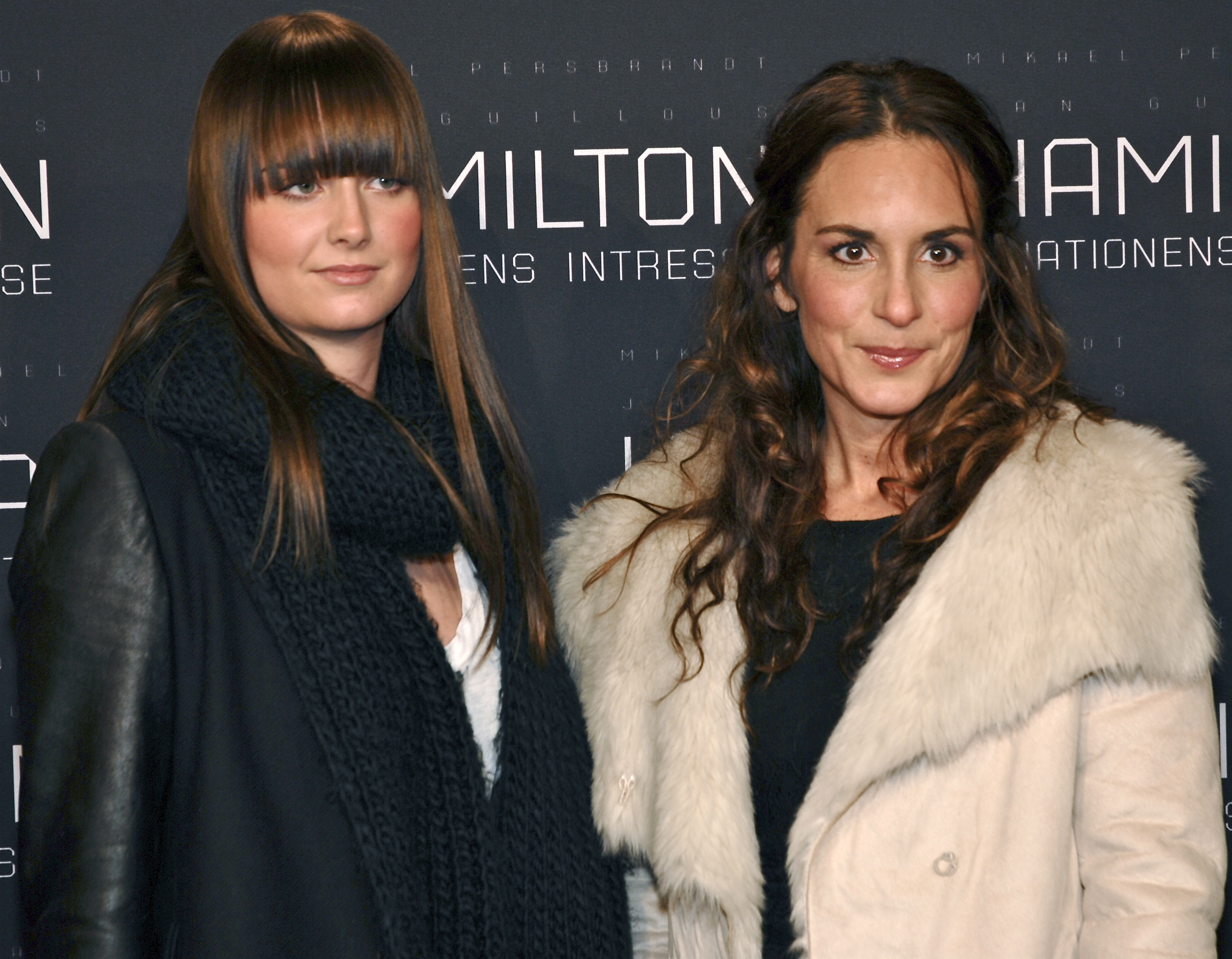
Alexandra Rapaport with her sister Josefina.

Her niece, alpine free-skier Matilda Rapaport, died in an avalanche accident in 2016.

== Selected filmography ==
- Tsatsiki, morsan och polisen (1999) - Tina
- Witchcraft (1999) – Christina
- Executive Protection (2000) - Pernilla
- Kronprinsessan (2006) (TV) – Charlotte Ekeblad
- A Midsummer Night's Party (2009) – Sofia
- The Sandhamn Murders (2010–present) (TV) – Nora Linde
- The Crown Jewels (2011) - Marianne Fernandez
- The Hunt (2012) - Nadja
- Once Upon a Time in Phuket (2012) - Siri
- The Team (2015) (TV) – Liv Eriksen
- Modus (2015–2017) (TV) - Ulrika Sjöberg
- Gåsmamman (2015–present) (TV) - Sonja Nordin Ek
- Spring Tide (2018) (TV) - Charlotte Pram
- Kieler Street (2018) – Nina Novak/Alina
- Heder (2019–present) (TV) - Nour
- A Storm for Christmas (2022) (Netflix series) - Bobbie
- Veronika (2024–present) (TV) - Veronika

== See also ==
- Rappaport family

== Sources ==
- 'Mish Mash', Judisk Krönika, 1-1999
