= Arvid Sand =

Swedish actor (born 1998)

- Born: January 16, 1998 (age 28); Virestad, Kronoberg, Sweden
- Occupation: Actor

Karl Arvid Sand (born 16 January 1998 in Virestad) is a Swedish actor.

Sand was cast for two short films before he got his big breakthrough in 2019. He made his debut 2017 by playing the main role in the short film Stjärnhimmel, produced by Christian Zetterberg. The year after, he was cast for the Netflix originals drama series Quicksand which premiered on 5 April 2019. He was playing the role of a close friend to the protagonist's boyfriend.

== Filmography ==
- 2010 – Solglimt
- 2015 – Jippie as Adam
- 2017 – Incestuous as David
- 2017 – When We Dreamed as Devin
- 2017 – Stjärnhimmel as Jacob
- 2019 – Quicksand (TV series) as Lars-Gabriel "Labbe" Sager-Crona
- 2023 - Ondskan
- 2024 – Veronika
