= This Is for the White in Your Eyes =

Studio album by Choir of Young Believers
- Released: September 1, 2008 (DK); August 18, 2009 (US/EU); December 16, 2009 (JP)
- Genre: Chamber pop; avant pop; orchestral pop; art pop; indie pop; slowcore
- Length: 46:30
- Label: Ghostly International; Tigerspring; art union
- Producer: Anders Rhedin; Fridolin Tai Nordsø Schjoldan; Jannis Noya Makrigiannis

Choir of Young Believers chronology
Choir vs. Evil (EP) (2007)	This Is for the White in Your Eyes (2008)	Rhine Gold (2012)

Singles from This Is for the White in Your Eyes
- 1. "Action/Reaction" Released: February 16, 2009; 2. "Next Summer" Released: July 14, 2009; 3. "Claustrophobia" Released: March 9, 2010

Alternative cover
- Tigerspring artwork

This Is for the White in Your Eyes is the debut studio album by Copenhagen-based Danish chamber pop band Choir of Young Believers, released in Denmark on September 1, 2008 on Tigerspring, in the United States and Europe on August 18, 2009 on Ghostly International, and in Japan on December 16, 2009 on art union.

== Critical reception ==
Professional ratings
Aggregate scores
Source	Rating
Metacritic	77/100
Review scores
Source	Rating
The A.V. Club	B+
Clash	7/10
Consequence of Sound	C+
The Guardian	3/5 stars
Mojo	4/5 stars
Prefix Magazine	9.0/10
Spin	3.5/5 stars
Tiny Mix Tapes	2/5 stars
Uncut	4/5 stars

This Is for the White in Your Eyes received largely positive reviews from contemporary music critics. The sound of the album drew comparisons to artists such as Bon Iver and Sigur Rós. At Metacritic, which assigns a normalized rating out of 100 to reviews from mainstream critics, the album received an average score of 77, based on 10 reviews, which indicates "generally favorable reviews".

Noel Murray of The A.V. Club gave the album a positive review, stating, "This Is for the White in Your Eyes is majestic and haunting in the best sense, as Makrigiannis uses strings, chopped-up percussion tracks, and his own multi-tracked voice to create the sense of a gradually unfolding moment. Makrigiannis lets notes hang, which, given the fragility of his voice, means he risks pushing a note so far that it cracks. And yet if there's one quality that unifies Choir of Young Believers' songs, it's precision. Makrigiannis' style makes a strong first impression, as his songs flow naturally from muted sorrow to booming emotion and back. He evokes the calm, the storm, and the aftermath."

== Track listing ==
All tracks are written by Jannis Noya Makrigiannis, except where noted.

No.	Title	Writer(s)	Length
1.	"Hollow Talk"	Anders Rhedin; Jannis Noya Makrigiannis	5:21
2.	"Next Summer"		3:45
3.	"These Rituals of Mine"		4:34
4.	"Action/Reaction"		4:36
5.	"Under the Moon"		4:19
6.	"Wintertime Love"		5:22
7.	"She Walks"		5:27
8.	"Why Must It Always Be This Way"		4:28
9.	"Claustrophobia"		4:51
10.	"Yamagata"		3:47
Total length:			46:30

Burn the Flag (EP)
No.	Title	Length
1.	"Burn the Flag"	4:34
2.	"Sharpen Your Knife"	3:38
3.	"We Talk on the Phone"	5:59
4.	"Riot"	4:42
Total length:		18:53

- "Claustrophobia" contains lyrics from "I Hold the Old" by Kim LAS.

== Personnel ==
Main personnel

- Jannis Noya Makrigiannis – arrangement, bass, guitar, keyboard, lyrics, percussion, piano, vocals, writing
- Fridolin Tai Nordsø Schjoldan – arrangement, backing vocals, bass, drums, flute, keyboard, percussion, trumpet
- Anders Rhedin – arrangement, backing vocals, drums, guitar, keyboard, percussion, lyrics (1)
- Bo Rande – backing vocals, horns, keyboard
- Cæcilie Trier – backing vocals, cello
- Mette Sand Hersoug – backing vocals, flute, violin
- Jakob Millung – bass
- Casper Henning – drums, percussion
- Frederik Nordsø – percussion
- Lasse Herbst – percussion
- Nicolai Kleinerman Koch – piano

Additional personnel

- Jannis Noya Makrigiannis – engineering, mastering, production
- Fridolin Tai Nordsø Schjoldan – engineering, mastering, production
- Anders Rhedin – engineering, mastering, percussion, production
- Frederik Tao – mixing, mastering
- Nis Bysted – artwork
- Nis Sigurdsson – artwork

== In popular culture ==
- "Hollow Talk" was featured in the opening and closing titles of Scandinavian television series The Bridge.
