= Rhine Gold (album) =

Studio album by Choir of Young Believers
- Released: February 27, 2012 (EU); March 20, 2012 (US)
- Studios: Realfarm Studios in Stege; Moono in Copenhagen; Sauna Recording Studio in Frederiksberg; Fishcorp in Copenhagen
- Genres: Chamber pop; avant pop; orchestral pop
- Length: 54:28
- Labels: Ghostly International; Tigerspring
- Producers: Aske Zidore; Nis Bysted

Choir of Young Believers chronology
This Is for the White in Your Eyes (2008)	Rhine Gold (2012)	Grasque (2016)

Singles from Rhine Gold
- 1. "Patricia's Thirst" Released: October 14, 2011; 2. "Sedated" Released: October 14, 2011; 3. "Nye Nummer Et" Released: January 29, 2012

Alternative cover
- Tigerspring artwork

Rhine Gold is the second studio album by Copenhagen-based Danish chamber pop band Choir of Young Believers, released in Europe on February 27, 2012, on Tigerspring and in the United States on March 20, 2012, on Ghostly International.

== Critical reception ==
Professional ratings
Aggregate scores
Source	Rating
Metacritic	77/100
Review scores
Source	Rating
AllMusic	3.5/5 stars
Consequence of Sound	C+
Exclaim!	8/10
Filter	81%
The Guardian	4/5 stars
musicOMH	3.5/5 stars
Paste	7.9/10
Pitchfork	7.7/10
PopMatters	7/10 stars
Under the Radar	8/10 stars

Rhine Gold received largely positive reviews from contemporary music critics. At Metacritic, which assigns a normalized rating out of 100 to reviews from mainstream critics, the album received an average score of 77, based on 18 reviews, which indicates "generally favorable reviews".

Austin Trunick of Under the Radar praised the album, stating, "Rhine Gold manages to sound little like anything else that's arrived in recent years. With lead singer Makrigiannis' aloof vocals daringly clearing trails through swaths of rich synthesizer and grandiose orchestral pop accompaniment, it stealthily slips into a sea of cool detachment rarely heard since David Bowie's Berlin period, particularly in the funky outsider vibe given off on Low. At its most morose, it recalls the weary, sun-faded blues of Dennis Wilson's Pacific Ocean Blue. Riveting and unpredictable across multiple plays, Choir of Young Believers has expanded upon the blueprint outlined on their well-crafted first album and channeled it into a sophomore release that's really outstanding."

Eric Harvey of Pitchfork Media gave the album a positive review, stating, "Choir of Young Believers have created a singular sonic world all their own. They don't let you get comfortable for too long at a stretch, but their itchy curiosity is its own reward."

== Track listing ==
All tracks are written by Jannis Noya Makrigiannis.

No.	Title	Length
1.	"The Third Time"	7:12
2.	"Patricia's Thirst"	2:39
3.	"Sedated"	6:25
4.	"Paralyze"	10:13
5.	"Have I Ever Truly Been Here"	6:28
6.	"Nye Nummer Et" (English: New Number One)	4:42
7.	"Paint New Horrors"	4:37
8.	"The Wind Is Blowing Needles"	5:54
9.	"Rhine Gold"	6:18
Total length:		54:28

== Personnel ==
Main personnel

- Jannis Noya Makrigiannis – vocals, guitar, keyboard
- Jakob Millung – bass, lap steel guitar, backing vocals
- Cæcilie Trier – cello, backing vocals
- Lasse Herbst – percussion
- Casper Henning Hansen – drums
- Bo Rande – horns, keyboard, backing vocals
- Sonja Labianca – keyboard, saxophone
- Jeppe Brix Sørensen – guitar (5)
- Aske Zidore – additional guitar
- Nis Bysted – additional guitar
- Rune Borup – keyboard (5)

Additional personnel

- Anders Schumann – mastering (5)
- Mikkel Gemzøe – mastering (5)
- Aske Zidore – production (1–4, 6–9), recording (1–4, 6–9), mixing (1–4, 6–9)
- Nis Bysted – production (1–4, 6–9), recording (1–4, 6–9), mixing (1–4, 6–9)
- Rune Borup – recording (5)
- Jannis Noya Makrigiannis – artwork
- Nis Bysted – artwork
- Nis Sigurdsson – artwork
- Cæcilie Trier – photography
- Frederik Sølberg – photography
- Peter Bysted – photography
