= At Point Blank (film) =

2003 Swedish action film

Rånarna
- Swedish DVD cover
- Directed by: Peter Lindmark
- Written by: Peter Lindmark
- Produced by: Steve Aalam; Thomas Allercrantz
- Starring: Sofia Helin; Mikael Persbrandt; Stefan Sauk; Stina Ekblad
- Cinematography: Eric Maddison
- Edited by: Mattias Morheden
- Music by: Johan Söderqvist
- Production company: Röde Orm Film
- Distributed by: Universal Pictures Nordic
- Release date: 13 December 2003 (Lucia Movie Night)
- Running time: 105 minutes
- Country: Sweden
- Language: Swedish

At Point Blank (Swedish: Rånarna) is a 2003 Swedish action film. It stars Mikael Persbrandt, Stina Ekblad, Sofia Helin and Peter Franzén.

== Plot ==
The film involves a skillful team of professional thieves who hit several banks in Stockholm. The police investigation is led by 33-year-old chief inspector Klara (Sofia Helin) and Greger Krona (Stefan Sauk) who are led to the source, with a fatal exit.

Klara, a chief inspector of the Stockholm robbery commission, is in love with Frank (Mikael Persbrandt), a surgeon for Doctors Without Borders. The story opens during a bank robbery unlike any in Swedish history, carried out with military professionalism.

The thieves disappear with the money, and their escape car is found burning in a forest. Heavily armed police surround the forest. Suddenly, one of the robbers starts shooting at a police helicopter searching the forest, providing cover for the robbers to escape.

Klara and her colleague, Krona soon realize that they are not dealing with ordinary bank robbers. The thieves have information on bank delivery times, police work, safety, and their behavior is extreme. The hunt is intense, the villains' methods becoming frighteningly more sophisticated.

== Cast ==
- Mikael Persbrandt as Frank
- Sofia Helin as Klara
- Stefan Sauk as Greger Krona
- Stina Ekblad as Marianne
- Peter Franzén as Juha/Jarkko
- Jarmo Mäkinen as Raimo
- Steve Aalam as Tommy
- Stina Zacco as Eva
- Stig Engström as Ingmar Hjälm
- Irma Schultz as Jeanette Hjälm
- Simon Averin-Markström as Johan Hjälm
- Jens Hultén as Response Force officer Mattsson
