= Reuben Sallmander =

Swedish actor and singer (born 1966)

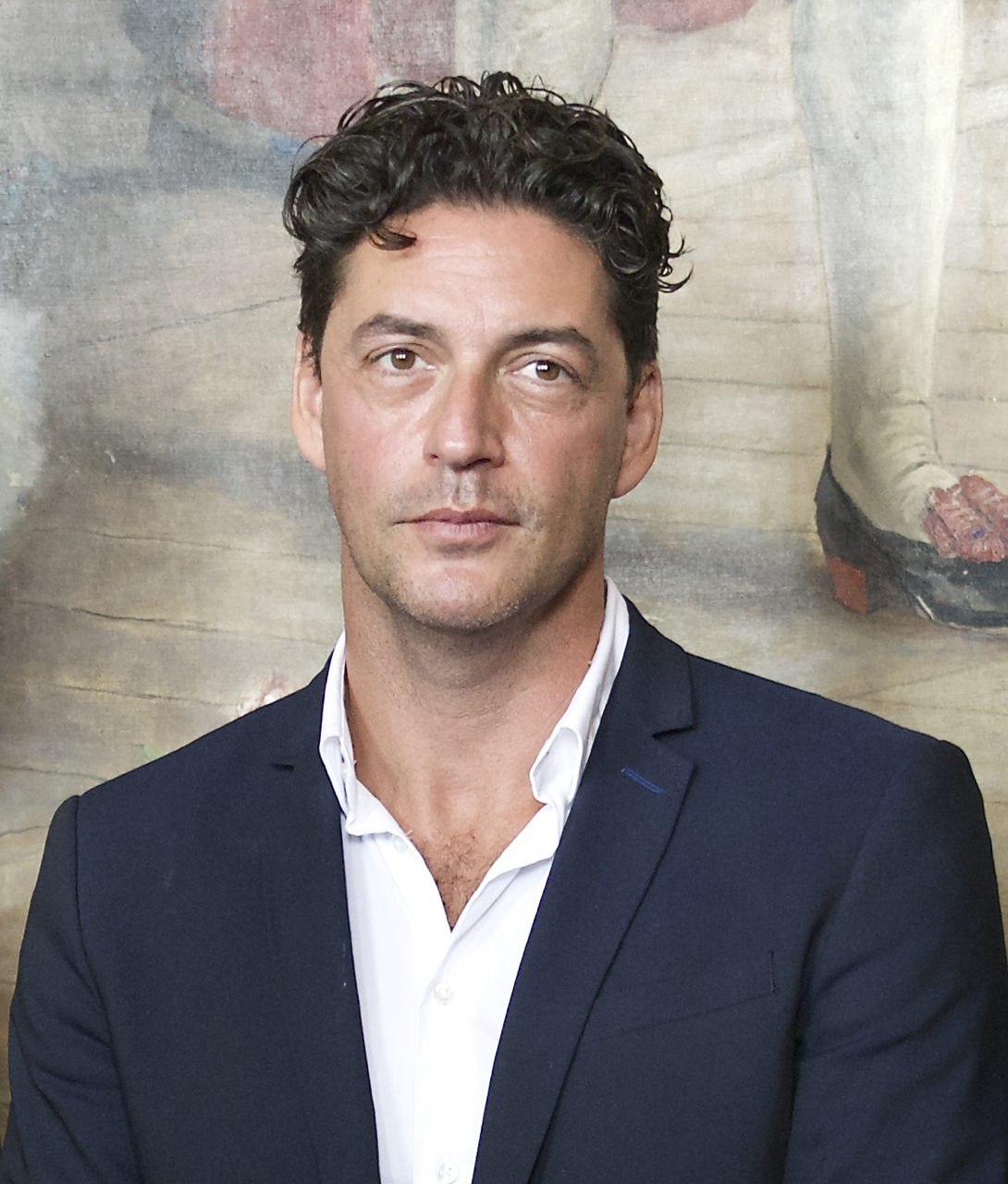
- Sallmander in 2014
- Born: Reuben Robert Joakim Sallmander; 11 February 1966 (age 60); Stockholm, Sweden
- Occupation: Actor
- Years active: 1990–present
- Spouse: Caroline (b. 1974)
- Children: 5

Reuben Robert Joakim Sallmander (born 11 February 1966) is a Swedish actor and singer of Jewish heritage.

== Early life and education ==
Sallmander was born on 11 February 1966, in Stockholm, and attended the Jewish school. He spent two years at a kibbutz in Israel. He graduated from the Swedish National Academy of Mime and Acting in 1990.

== Career ==
He has since acted in a wide array of theatre plays, films and television productions. In 2013, he appeared in Crimes of Passion. In 2015, he played a key character in season 3 of the internationally acclaimed Danish-Swedish TV crime series The Bridge.

== Filmography ==
Year	Title	Role	Notes
1990	The Guardian Angel	Konstantin	
1991	Den ofrivillige golfaren	Konstnären	
1992	Ha ett underbart liv	Jesper	
1992	Den demokratiske terroristen	Polis i lägenhet	
1993	Härifrån till Kim	Mik	
1994	Pillertrillaren	Ragnar 'Rico' Bensen	
1994	Bara du & jag	Jafet, TV-reporter	
1996	Rusar i hans famn	Brown-Eyed Man	
1997	9 millimeter	Ruiz	
2001	Evert		
2006	When Darkness Falls	Aram	
2009	The Girl with the Dragon Tattoo	Enrico Giannini	
2009	Johan Falk: GSI - Gruppen för särskilda insatser	Tommy Ridders	
2009	The Girl Who Played with Fire	Enrico Giannini	
2012	Agent Hamilton: But Not If It Concerns Your Daughter	Pierre Tanguy	
2017	Mending Hugo's Heart	Hugo's father	
2019	Quicksand	Claes Fagerman	Netflix Series; 5 episodes
