= Lotte Munk =

Danish actress (born 1969)

Lotte Munk (born 8 October 1969 in Hals) is a Danish actress.

She is trained at the Drama School at Aarhus Theatre in 1995.

She is known from her role in The Killing II.

== Filmography ==
- Idioterne (1998) – Britta
- Familien Gregersen (2005) – Guest
- De fortabte sjæles ø (2007) – Magenta
- MollyCam (2008) – The police mans wife
- Hvidstengruppen (2012) - Erna Larsen

=== Television series ===
- Hotellet, episode 19 (2001) – Anja
- Ørnen (TV-serie), episodes 4-5, 8 (2004) – Dorte Lund Olsen
- Klovn (TV-show), episode 47 (2008) – Pernille
- The Killing II, episodes 4-5 (2009) – Lisbet Thomsen
- The Bridge, season 2 (2013) – Caroline Brandstrup-Julin
