= Mattias Morheden =

Swedish film and television editor (born 1970)

- Born: 26 September 1970 (age 55); Sweden
- Occupation: Film editor

Mattias Morheden (born 26 September 1970) is a Swedish film and television editor. He has edited productions such as Wallander (2005), The Girl Who Played with Fire (2009) and The Girl Who Kicked the Hornets' Nest (2009).

== Editor ==
- 2012: Apartment 1303 3D
- 2011: En gång i Phuket
- 2011: False Trail
- 2011: Hur många lingon finns det i världen?
- 2010: Hotell Gyllene Knorren
- 2010: Millennium (TV mini-series)
- 2010: Klara - Don't Be Afraid to Follow Your Dream
- 2010: Att bli med barn (short)
- 2009: The Girl Who Kicked the Hornets' Nest
- 2009: The Girl Who Played with Fire
- 2009: A Rational Solution
- 2009: Together
- 2008-2009: Habib (TV series)
- 2007: Labyrint (TV series)
- 2006: Hombres (TV series)
- 2006: Säg att du älskar mig
- 2006: Brothers: The Return
- 2006: Mentor (short)
- 2005: The Laser Man (TV mini-series)
- 2005: Wallander (TV series)
- 2005: The Return of the Dancing Master
- 2004: Skeppsholmen (TV series)
- 2003: At Point Blank
- 2003: Dirigenten (short)
- 2002: Disco Kung Fu (short)
- 2002: En kärleksaffär (TV short)
