= Chatarina Larsson =

Swedish actress

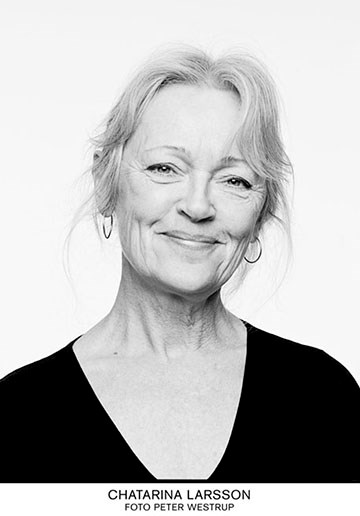
- Larsson in 2009
- Born: Ingrid Chatarina Larsson; 2 April 1947 (age 79); Stockholm, Sweden
- Occupation: Actress
- Years active: 1964–present

Ingrid Chatarina Larsson is a Swedish actress born on 2 April 1947 in Stockholm.

== Career ==
Larsson's first appearance was with her father, in Lisebergsteatern in 1964, in the variety show Far i luften. She studied at drama school in Malmö from 1967-1970, and later worked at the Stockholm City Theatre from 1970-1976, and later at a Scanian theatre.

She has worked as a teacher at a theatre school in Stockholm. In 1979, she was awarded the Theater Society's Daniel Engdahl scholarship. She is daughter of actor and artist Egon Larsson and singer Gun Larsson.

== Selected filmography ==
- En kille och en tjej (1975)
- Den allvarsamma leken (1997)
- Hitler och vi på Klamparegatan (1997)
- Waiting for the Tenor (1998)
- S:t Mikael (TV series, 1998)
- Vägen ut (1999)
- Innan frosten (2005)
- Carambole (2005)
- Kommissionen (TV series, 2005)
- Cockpit (2012)
- A Man Called Ove (2015)
- Veronika (2024)
