= Choir of Young Believers =

Danish musical project

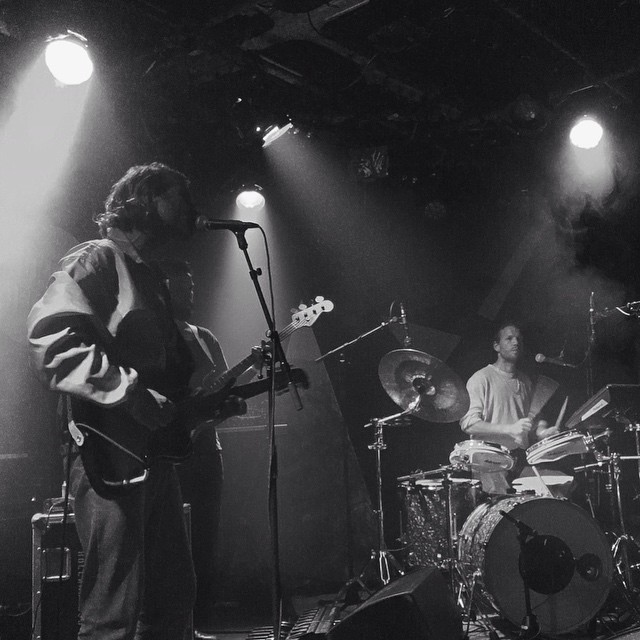
- Choir of Young Believers performing in 2015

Background information
- Also known as: COYB
- Origin: Copenhagen, Denmark
- Genres: Chamber pop; avant pop; orchestral pop
- Years active: 2006–2022
- Labels: Ghostly International; Tigerspring; Chess Club; PonyRec; art union
- Past members: Jannis Noya Makrigiannis; Jakob Millung; Cæcilie Trier; Lasse Herbst; Casper Henning Hansen; Bo Rande; Sonja Labianca; Aske Zidore; Mette Sand Hersoug; Fridolin Nordsø; Nicolai Koch; Frederik Nordsø; Anders Rhedin

Choir of Young Believers was the musical project of singer, writer and guitarist Jannis Noya Makrigiannis from Copenhagen, Denmark. The band, which consisted of Makrigiannis along with a rotating cast of supporting players, has had multiple No. 1 hits in their home country of Denmark and was named "Best New Act" at the 2009 Danish Music Awards. COYB's music combines folk melodies, orchestral instrumentation and dark lyrics.

== History ==
After the 2006 breakup of his previous band, Lake Placid, Makrigiannis moved to the Greek island of Samos and began developing his own solo material. Upon his return to Copenhagen, Makrigiannis gathered musicians and friends to form Choir of Young Believers. The group released the EP Burn the Flag in 2007, with the single "Sharpen Your Knife" receiving heavy play on Danish radio. In September 2008, the band released its first full-length album, This Is for the White in Your Eyes, and it was nominated for six Danish Music Awards and won the "Best New Act" category.

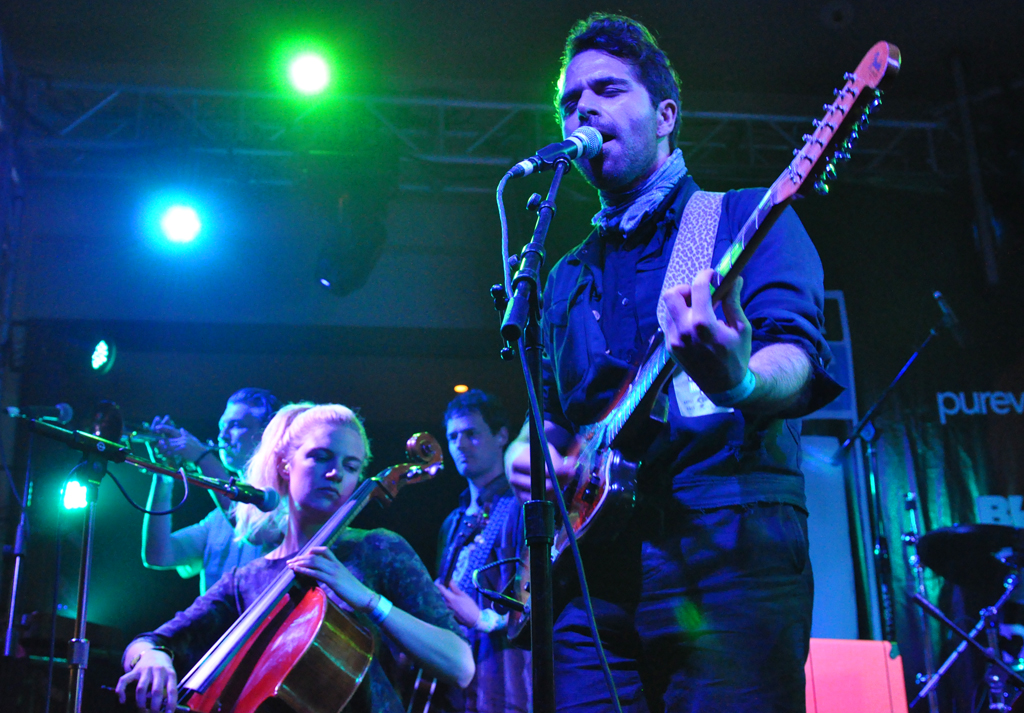
Choir of Young Believers performing at SXSW 2012 in Austin, Texas

COYB performed at the 2009 SXSW music festival, after which it was signed to US label Ghostly International. They released This Is for the White in Your Eyes in North America on 18 August 2009. The next album, Rhine Gold, was released in March 2012. The band's third studio album, Grasque, was released on 19 February 2016.

The song "Hollow Talk" from the band's debut album was used over the opening and closing credits of the Danish-Swedish police television series The Bridge, which ran for four seasons between 2011 and 2018 and became a worldwide hit.

Makrigiannis died on 30 December 2022 after a short illness.

== Members ==
- Jannis Noya Makrigiannis: vocals, guitar, piano, bass, keyboard, percussion (died 2022)
- Cæcilie Trier: cello, backing vocals
- Jakob Millung: bass
- Bo Rande: brass instruments, keyboard, backing vocals
- Sonja Labianca: piano
- Lasse Herbst: percussion
- Casper Henning Hansen: drums, percussion
- Aske Zidore: guitar, production
- Anders Rhedin: keyboard, drums, guitar, percussion, backing vocals (until 2008)
- Mette Sand Hersoug: violin, flute, backing vocals (until 2008)
- Fridolin Nordsø: bass, drums, percussion, trumpet, flute, keyboard, backing vocals (until 2008)
- Nicolai Koch: piano (until 2008)
- Frederik Nordsø: percussion (until 2008)

== Discography ==
=== Studio albums ===
- 2008: This Is for the White in Your Eyes
- 2012: Rhine Gold
- 2016: Grasque
- 2022: Holy Smoke

=== EPs ===
- 2007: Burn the Flag (EP)
- 2007: Choir vs. Evil (EP)

=== Singles ===
- 2007: "Sharpen Your Knife"
- 2009: "Action/Reaction" (Ghostly International)
- 2009: "Next Summer" (Ghostly International)
- 2014: "Hollow Talk"
- 2015: "Face Melting"
- 2015: "Jeg ser dig"
- 2015: "Serious Lover"

=== Tracks featured ===
- 2009: "Ghostly Essentials: Avant-Pop One" (Ghostly International)
- 2009: Numb3rs, opening and end credits for series 6 episode 1 – "Hollow Talk" from the album "This Is for the White in Your Eyes" (Ghostly International)
- 2009: One Tree Hill, season 7 episode 3 – "Hollow Talk" plays where Haley and Nathan are arguing
- 2010: Submarino, Danish drama film directed by Thomas Vinterberg
- 2011: The Bridge, opening and end credits - "Hollow Talk"
- 2014: Reign, season 1 episode 18 - "Hollow Talk" plays at the end of the episode.
