= Grasque =

Studio album by Choir of Young Believers
- Released: February 19, 2016
- Genres: Chamber pop; ambient pop; alternative R&B; avant pop; orchestral pop; art pop
- Length: 58:41
- Languages: English; Danish; Greek
- Labels: Ghostly International; Tigerspring
- Producer: Aske Zidore

Choir of Young Believers chronology
Rhine Gold (2012)	Grasque (2016)

Singles from Grasque
- 1. "Face Melting" Released: May 5, 2015; 2. "Jeg Ser Dig" Released: September 23, 2015; 3. "Serious Lover" Released: November 29, 2015; 4. "Perfect Estocada" Released: January 15, 2016

Alternative cover
- Tigerspring artwork

Grasque is the third studio album by Copenhagen-based Danish chamber pop band Choir of Young Believers, released on February 19, 2016, on Ghostly International in the United States and on Tigerspring in Europe.

The album was preceded by the singles "Face Melting", "Jeg Ser Dig", and "Serious Lover".

The album's title, Grasque, is a phonetic spelling of the Danish word "Græske", pluralis of "Greek".

== Critical reception ==
Professional ratings
Aggregate scores
Source	Rating
Metacritic	59/100
Review scores
Source	Rating
AllMusic	3/5 stars
Clash	6/10
The Guardian	3/5 stars
Mojo	4/5 stars
musicOMH	3/5 stars
Paste	7.0/10
PopMatters	4/10 stars
Q	3/5 stars
Uncut	3/5 stars
Under the Radar	8/10 stars

Grasque received mixed to positive reviews from contemporary music critics. At Metacritic, which assigns a normalized rating out of 100 to reviews from mainstream critics, the album received an average score of 59, based on 11 reviews, which indicates "mixed or average reviews".

Cody Ray Shafer of Under the Radar praised the album, stating, "Makrigiannis' contribution to pop music is certainly underappreciated, but creatively rivaled by artists like Brian Eno and Scott Walker. Big, complicated ideas are understandably hard to execute, but Grasque is a serious exploration of the deepest reaches of pop music. But it is the gracefulness of those explorations that rival even Rhine Gold, a feat that shouldn't even be possible, but Grasque pulls it off without missing a single note."

Brice Ezell of PopMatters was more critical of the album, stating, "Grasque‘s biggest missteps come when it fails to strike the balances that Makrigiannis has skillfully executed in the past: the wispy with the visceral, the esoteric and the catchy. In fleeting moments Grasque offers glimpses into Makrigiannis’s inventive musical mind, but too often it gets stuck wandering up in the clouds. The view is pretty up there, but the risk of running out of oxygen increases the longer you stay."

== Track listing ==
All tracks are written by Jannis Noya Makrigiannis.

No.	Title	Length
1.	"Olimpiyskiy" (English: Olympic)	1:38
2.	"Serious Lover"	5:25
3.	"Vaserne"	1:55
4.	"Face Melting"	7:05
5.	"Græske" (English: Greek)	8:16
6.	"Jeg Ser Dig" (English: I See You)	6:09
7.	"Cloud Nine"	5:33
8.	"The Whirlpool Enigma"	1:20
9.	"Perfect Estocada"	5:36
10.	"Salvatore"	0:52
11.	"Gamma Moth"	5:58
12.	"Does It Look as If I Care"	8:54
Total length:		58:41

== Personnel ==
Main personnel

- Jannis Noya Makrigiannis –
- Jakob Falgren –
- Casper Henning Hansen –
- Nicolai Kleinerman Koch –
- Sonja Labianca –
- Rosa Noya Makrigiannis –
- Cæcilie Trier –
- Rasmus Valldorf –

Additional personnel

- Aske Zidore – engineering, mixing, production
- Glenn Nielsen – engineering
- Flemming Rasmussen – engineering
- Tommy Kamp Vestergaard – engineering
