= Gåsmamman =

- Genre: Drama
- Country of origin: Sweden
- Original language: Swedish

Original release
- Release: 26 November 2015

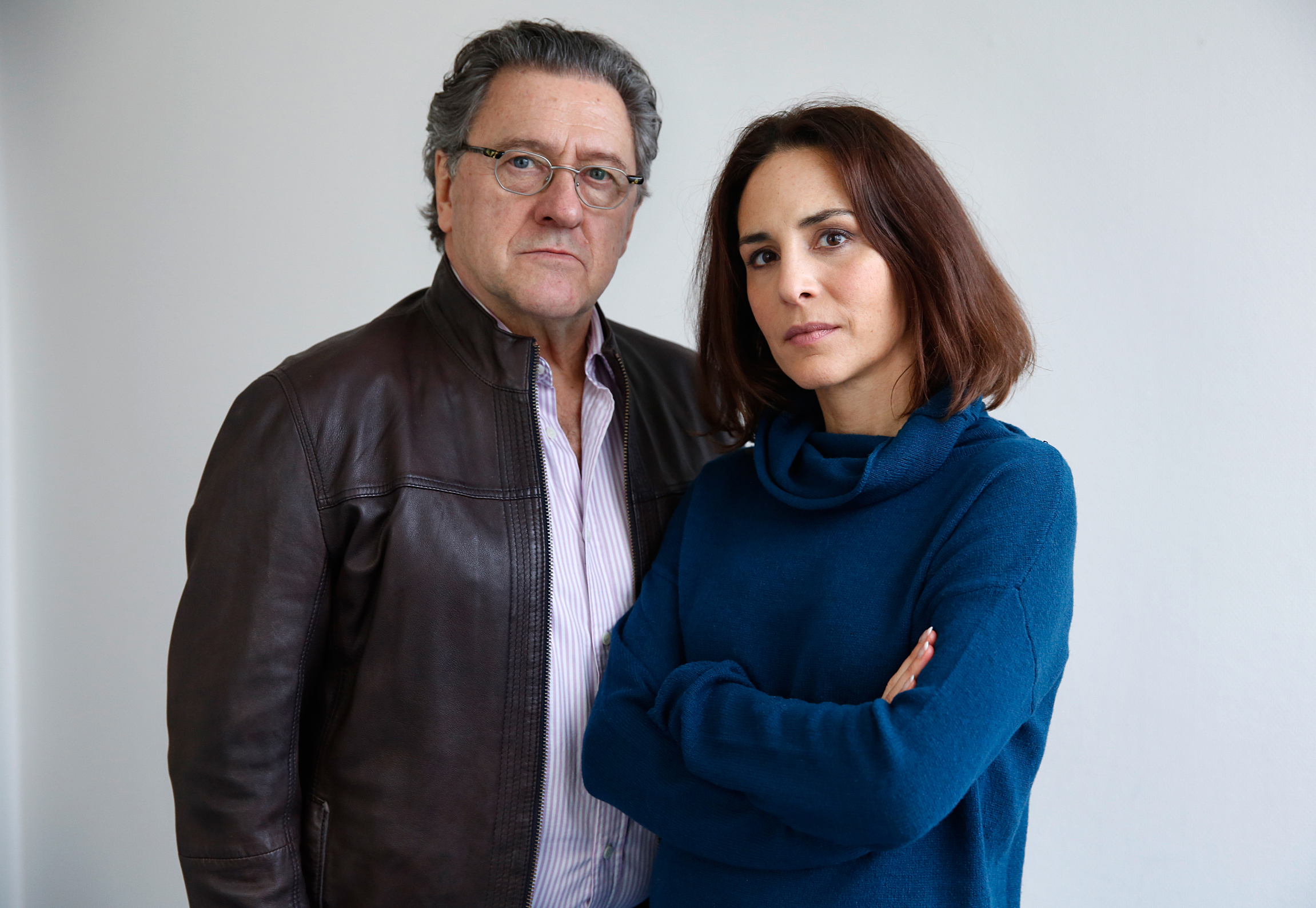
Alexandra Rapaport and Tommy Körberg.

Gåsmamman is a Swedish drama series that started airing on C More Series in November 2015. The lead role is played by Alexandra Rapaport. The series premiered on Kanal5 on 18 February 2016. The series is based on the Dutch drama series Penoza from 2010 created by Pieter Bart Korthuis and Diederik van Rooijen. There is also an American version of the series from 2013, called Red Widow.

The story focuses on Sonja (Alexandra Rapaport) who lives a carefree life with her family near Stockholm and works as an accountant in the family business at the marina. One day Sonja is drawn into the criminal underworld to save her family.

Originally the show was released on a movie channel and SVOD platform C More, with a terrestrial release the following year on Kanal 5. TV 4, the parent company of C More took over the terrestrial right with season 4.

Alexandra Rapaport won the 2017 Kristallen Award 2017 for the Best Female Role in a Television Production for Gåsmamman.

== Cast ==
- Alexandra Rapaport – Sonja Ek
- Magnus Roosmann – Fredrik Ek
- Edvin Ryding – Linus Ek
- Clara Christiansson – Nina Ek
- Shebly Niavarani – Emil Svensson
- Christian Svensson – Barry
- Tommy Körberg – Anders Nordin
- Joel Lützow – Gustav Ek
- Grynet Molvig – Klara Nordin
- Anja Lundkvist – Kattis Berg Antonsen
- Ulf Friberg – Lukas Sandrini
- Allan Svensson - Henrik Östling
- Ivan Mathias Petersson – Niklas Nordin
- Morgan Alling – Simon Svart
- Rakel Wärmländer - Mimmi "Fickan" Olsson
- Anastasios Soulis - Zac
- Francisco Sobrado - Pinto Rosales
- Gustaf Hammarsten – Christian Broman
- Peshang Rad – Johan Nordin
- Bahador Foladi - "Speedy"
- Susanne Thorson – Magdalena Nordin
- Madeleine Barwén Trollvik – Felicia
- Andreas Kundler – Stein Berg Antonsen
- Oscar Foronda - "El Largo"
- Joakim Nätterqvist - Patrik Thorin (Joining cast with season 4)
