= Sofia Helin =

Swedish actress (born 1972)

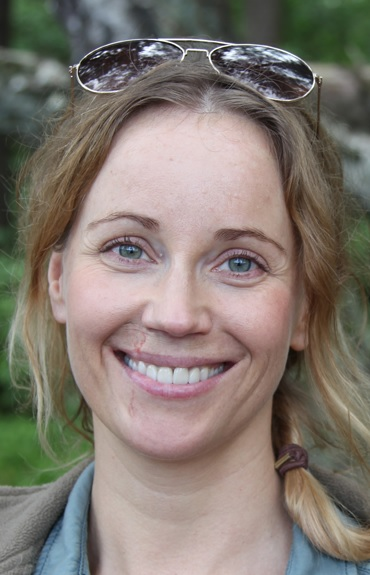
- Helin in 2012
- Born: Sofia Margareta Helin; April 25, 1972 (age 54); Hovsta, Örebro, Sweden
- Occupation: Actress
- Spouse: Daniel Götschenhjelm
- Children: 2

Sofia Margareta Götschenhjelm-Helin is a Swedish actress. She was nominated for a Guldbagge Award for her role in Dalecarlians, and stars as Saga Norén in the Danish/Swedish co-produced TV series The Bridge (Danish: Broen; Swedish: Bron).

== Early life and education ==
Sofia Margareta Helin was born on 25 April 1972 in Hovsta in Örebro, Närke. Her father was a salesman and her mother a nurse. When she was 10 days old, her grandmother and her six-year-old brother had a car accident; her grandmother survived, but her brother did not . She grew up in Linghem, near Linköping.

From 1994 to 1996, she went to Calle Flygares theatre school and graduated from the Stockholm Theatre Academy in 2001.

== Career ==
Helin played the leading role of Chief Inspector Klara in the film At Point Blank (Rånarna) in 2003. In 2004, she took the leading role of Mia in the Swedish comedy drama film Masjävlar, and was nominated for a Guldbagge award. In 2007 she played the leading role of Cecilia Algottsdotter in Arn, an adaptation of Jan Guillou's The Knight Templar, about Arn Magnusson. She also featured in the Swedish animated film Metropia (2009).

Helin became famous outside Sweden after 2012, when the first series of the highly successful Danish/Swedish TV crime drama series The Bridge went to air. In it, she played Saga Norén, a homicide detective from Malmö. In the UK, the series attracted more than a million viewers per episode, and she was called a role model for women with Asperger syndrome. The fourth and final season of the series aired in 2018.

In 2015, she starred in a Danish science fiction film called Fang Rung. In the same year, she acted in a British/German TV series directed by Oliver Hirschbiegel, about divided Berlin in the 1970s, called The Same Sky, in which she spoke in both German and English. The series was shot in Prague.

Helin plays an archaeologist in series 2 of the 2020 Australian TV crime drama Mystery Road.

She plays the lead role in the 2023 Swedish TV crime drama Fallen, again working with the director of The Bridge.

Helin plays Julia Rothman, the head of Scorpia, in the UK's third season of Alex Rider, airing on 5 April 2024 on Amazon Freevee in the UK, Germany, and the US.

== Personal life ==
Sofia Helin’s facial scar is the result of a serious bicycle accident that occurred in 1996 when she was 24 years old. According to interviews Helin has given regarding the accident, the incident happened while she was cycling to a film academy. Her bicycle reportedly broke in half while she was riding across a bridge, causing her to fall face-first onto the ground. The accident was severe and resulted in several significant injuries. She suffered a broken jaw, broken front teeth, and a severely torn lip. She also sustained a concussion and several other broken bones. She lost consciousness at the scene and woke up in an ambulance. The recovery process took approximately six months. Only months after the accident, she secured a place at a prestigious acting school and landed her first major TV role.

Helin married Daniel Götschenhjelm around 2003, a priest in the Church of Sweden and former actor, whom she met at drama school. They have a son Ossian Helin born in 2003 and a daughter Nike Helin born in 2009. In 2015 she was living in Stockholm.

Helin is a Christian.

== Filmography ==
- Rederiet (1997)
- Tusenbröder (2002)
- Beck – Sista vittnet (2002)
- At Point Blank (2003)
- Four Shades of Brown (2004)
- Dalecarlians (Masjävlar) (2004)
- Blodsbröder (2005)
- Nina Frisk (2007)
- Arn – The Knight Templar (2007)
- Arn – The Kingdom at Road's End (2008)
- Metropia - Swedish animated film (2009)
- Gåten Ragnarok (2013)
- The Bridge (Broen/Bron) - TV series (2011–2018)
- The Same Sky - TV series (2017)
- That Good Night (2017)
- The Snowman (2017)
- Mystery Road (series 2) - TV series (2020)
- Atlantic Crossing - TV series (2020)
- Exit (series 2) - Norwegian TV series (2021)
- Fallen (Sanningen; 2023), a six-part TV series co-created by The Bridge lead writer Camilla Ahlgren
- Alex Rider (2024)
