= Sigtunaskolan Humanistiska Läroverket =

Sigtunaskolan Humanistiska Läroverket (SSHL)

Location
- Manfred Björkquist allé 8 Sigtuna, Stockholm County, 193 28; Sweden

Information
- School type: Private non-profit, day & boarding
- Established: 1925 as SHL and 1927 as Sigtunaskolan. Merged in 1980
- Founders: Manfred Björkquist, Harry Cullberg and Arvid Bruno
- Chairman: Alf Linderman
- Director: Sofia Kinberg
- Enrollment: ~ 600
- Average class size: 28
- Language: Swedish and English
- Houses: 8
- Colours: Dark blue, Burgundy, Gray and White
- Song: "Time is Here"
- Athletics: Royals
- Team name: Royals
- Newspaper: SUUM CUIQUE - Vi & Vårt
- Website: www.sshl.se

Sigtunaskolan Humanistiska Läroverket (SSHL) is a coeducational independent school for boarding and day students between the ninth and twelfth grades. It is located in Sigtuna, Sweden. The school is attended by Swedish boarders, local children and foreigners.

As a non-profit private boarding school, management of the SSHL's financial and physical resources is jointly overseen by the Sigtuna Skolstiftelse (Sigtuna School Foundation), the Sigtunastiftelsen (National Sigtuna Foundation) and the Knut and Alice Wallenberg Foundation; all the trustees are drawn from Sigtuna citizens and school alumni. Day-to-day operations are headed by a school director and 2 principals, who are appointed by the trustees.

SSHL alumni include the current King of Sweden, Carl XVI Gustaf, and Olof Palme, the former Prime Minister of Sweden. SSHL is a member of the global G30 Schools group.

== History ==
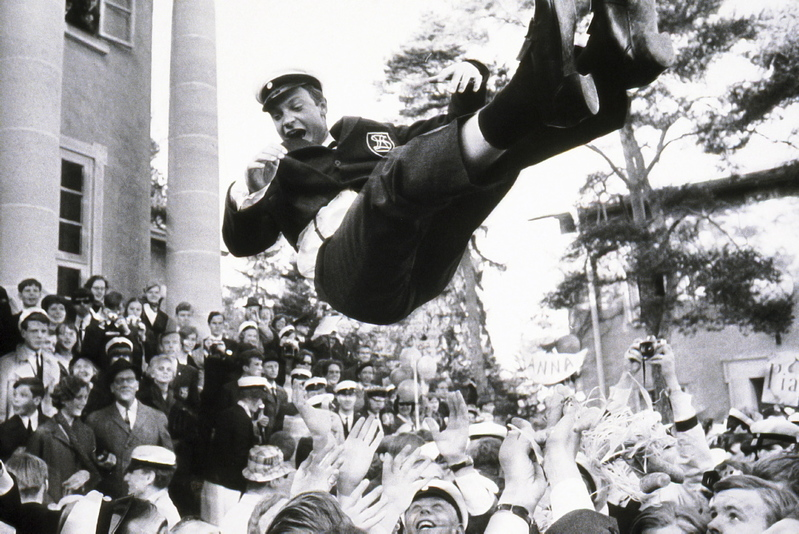
Graduation of Carl XVI Gustaf

Dating back to the mid-1920s, there were two boarding schools in Sigtuna: Sigtunastiftelsens Humanistiska Läroverk, which was founded by Bishop Manfred Björkquist, and Sigtunaskolan, the other boarding school that was founded by theologian Harry Cullberg.

The two schools merged in 1980 to form Sigtunaskolan Humanistiska Läroverket on where Sigtunastiftelsens Humanistiska Läroverk used to stand, a hill on the western side of Sigtuna.

During the night between 28 February and 1 March 2021, the school's almost 100 year old assembly hall, called Aula (originally the sports hall), caught on fire and burnt down.

== Education ==
Classes at SSHL are held from Monday to Friday. Emphasizing the school's primary principle of offering a Swedish educational experience with international characteristics, the school offers programs in both Swedish (Swedish gymnasium year 10-12) and English (International Baccalaureate IB).

=== International Baccalaureate Diploma Programme ===
SSHL offers students from 9th grade (MYP 4) to 10th grade (MYP 5) to attend the IB Middle Years Programme (MYP) and final year students to undertake the two-year IB Diploma programme and IB Career-related Programme. The school offer a variety of subjects to cater to the diverse body of students taking the program at SSHL and offer support CAS (Creativity, activity, service), a central emphasis of the IB program by organizing service trips to Laos, Nepal and Kenya.

== Notable alumni ==
- Carl XVI Gustaf (1946-), Swedish king
- Olof Palme (1927-1986), former Swedish prime minister
- Curt Nicolin (1921-2006), Swedish industrialist, former CEO and President of ASEA and ABB
- Annika Falkengren (1962-), Swedish industrialist, former President and CEO of Skandinaviska Enskilda Banken
- Richard, 6th Prince of Sayn-Wittgenstein-Berleburg (1934-2017)
- Carl Adam Lewenhaupt (1947–2017), Swedish count and businessman
- Ella Rappich (2000-), Swedish actress
- Nina Gualinga (1993-) Ecuadorian environmental and indigenous rights activist

== Sports ==
SSHL is a member of Sweden's Boarding and Private Schools' Sports Organization (Svenska Internat och Privatskolors Idrottsorganisation, SIPSI), founded in 1983, which allow students from different European and Swedish schools to compete in various sporting events throughout the academic year.

Furthermore, SSHL students compete against each other in the so called "House Series". Students are able to represent one of the school's "Houses" to which they belong, and take part in different athletic tournaments.

== See also ==
- List of boarding schools
- G30 Schools
