= Thalia Prize =

Swedish theatre award

- Native name: Thaliapriset
- Awarded for: Theatre distinction
- Sponsored by: Svenska Dagbladet
- Country: Sweden
- Established: 1951

The Thalia Prize (Swedish: Thaliapriset) is a Swedish theatre award given annually to an actor, director, or another theatre personality. It was established in December 1951 by the daily newspaper Svenska Dagbladet.

== Recipients ==
Individuals who have received the Thaliapriset include:

- 1951 – Anita Björk
- 1952 – Jarl Kulle
- 1953 – Gertrud Fridh
- 1954 – Ingvar Kjellson
- 1955 – Max von Sydow
- 1956 – Ulf Palme
- 1957 – Ingmar Bergman
- 1958 – Bengt Eklund
- 1959 – Gun Arvidsson
- 1960 – Allan Edwall
- 1961 – Ulla Smidje
- 1962 – Bibi Andersson
- 1963 – Toivo Pawlo
- 1964 – Gunnel Broström
- 1965 – Ulla Sjöblom
- 1966 – Kerstin Tidelius
- 1967 – Ernst-Hugo Järegård
- 1968 – Lennart Hjulström
- 1969 – Jan-Olof Strandberg
- 1970 – Ernst Günther
- 1971 – Gunnel Lindblom
- 1972 – Jan Malmsjö
- 1973 – Sven Wollter
- 1974 – Ulf Johansson
- 1975 – Keve Hjelm
- 1976 – Olof Bergström
- 1977 – Börje Ahlstedt
- 1978 – Margaretha Krook
- 1979–1980 – Kim Anderzon
- 1981 – Carl-Gustaf Lindstedt
- 1982 – Frej Lindqvist
- 1983 – Per Mattsson
- 1984 – Margaretha Byström
- 1985 – Sven Lindberg
- 1986 – Suzanne Osten
- 1987 – Eva Bergman
- 1988 – Lars Rudolfsson
- 1989 – Agneta Ekmanner
- 1990 – Peter Oskarson
- 1991 – Lars Molin
- 1992 – Finn Poulsen
- 1993 – Ingvar Hirdwall
- 1994 – Thommy Berggren
- 1995 – Linus Tunström
- 1996 – Staffan Valdemar Holm
- 1997 – Thorsten Flinck
- 1998 – Lena Endre
- 1999 – Anna Pettersson
- 2000 – Jasenko Selimovic
- 2001 – Birgitta Englin
- 2002 – Philip Zandén
- 2003 – Richard Turpin
- 2004 – Birgitta Egerbladh
- 2005 – Rickard Günther
- 2006 – Stina Ekblad
- 2007 – Sven Ahlström
- 2008 – Andreas Boonstra and Pontus Stenshäll
- 2009 – Alexander Mørk-Eidem
- 2010 – Marie Göranzon
- 2011 – Ingela Olsson
- 2012 – Carolina Frände
- 2013 – Mattias Andersson and Ulla Kassius
- 2014 – Sofia Jupither
- 2015 – Leif Andrée
- 2016 – Nils Poletti
- 2017 – Hannes Meidal and Jens Ohlin
- 2018 – Erik Ehn
- 2019 – Livia Millhagen
- 2020 – Johan Ulveson
- 2021 – Natalie Ringler
- 2022 – Staffan Göthe
- 2023 – Erik Holmström
- 2024 – Robert Fux
- 2025 – Ann Petrén

== See also ==
- Eugene O'Neill Award
- Gunn Wållgren Award
