= Livia Millhagen =

Swedish actress (born 1973)

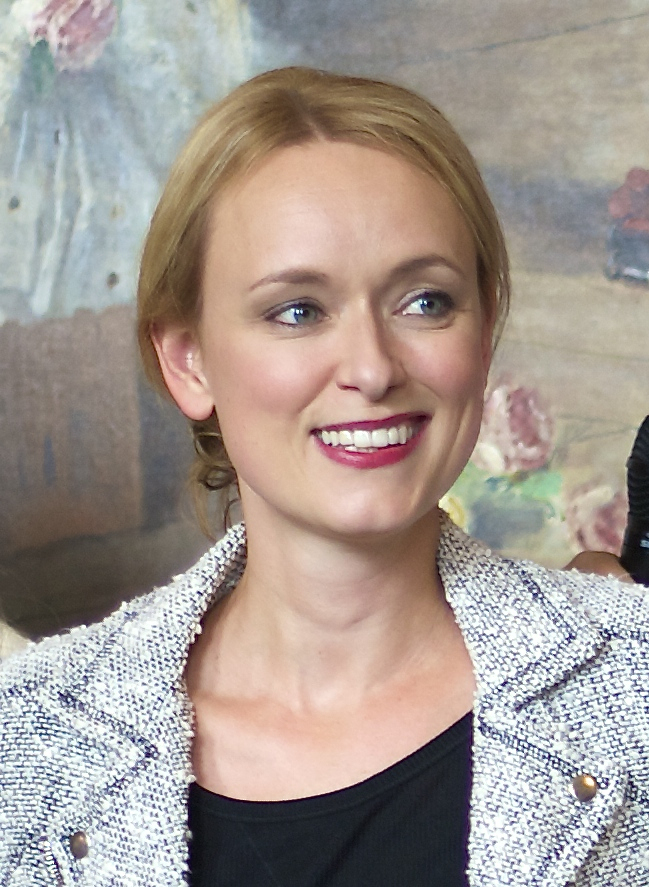
- Millhagen in 2014
- Born: Livia Maria Millhagen; 23 May 1973 (age 53); Stockholm, Sweden
- Education: Malmö Theatre Academy
- Occupation: Actress
- Years active: 1994–present
- Spouse: Oscar Norbeck
- Children: 2
- Parents: Lars Millhagen; Beate Sydhoff
- Awards: Litteris et Artibus (2015); Thaliapriset (2019)

Livia Maria Millhagen (born 23 May 1973) is a Swedish actress. Her work encompasses both stage and screen, and her accolades include the Thaliapriset from Svenska Dagbladet and the Litteris et Artibus royal medal for contributions to theatre. The daughter of Lars Millhagen and Beate Sydhoff, she grew up primarily in Stockholm. After graduating from the Malmö Theatre Academy in 1999, she appeared in productions at Uppsala City Theatre and made her feature film debut in Miffo (2003), for which she received critical praise and was nominated for the Guldbagge Award for Best Actress. She became a member of the Royal Dramatic Theatre's permanent ensemble, and since appeared in numerous productions. Some of her most acclaimed stage performances were playing Lydia Stille in The Serious Game at Stockholm City Theatre (2008) and Blanche DuBois in A Streetcar Named Desire at the Royal Dramatic Theatre (2019). In addition to her stage roles, she has appeared in films such as Road to Italy (2005), Fishy (2008), and Love Proof (2022). She had major television roles in Molanders (2013), Veni Vidi Vici (2017), and the first season of Bäckström (2020). Millhagen has also worked as a voice actress, narrating audiobooks and contributing to Swedish-language dubs of Disney/Pixar films.

== Early life and education ==
Livia Maria Millhagen was born in Stockholm on 23 May 1973 to Lars Millhagen and Beate Sydhoff. Her father was sculptor and cartoonist; her mother was an art critic and writer who also served as director for The House of Culture. She has an older sister and also had an older brother who died shortly after he was born. She grew up in the Gamla Stan neighbourhood of Stockholm, attending Storkyrkoskolan for her primary education. When she was a teenager, her family moved to Washington, D.C. for several years after her mother took a posting at the Swedish embassy there. Millhagen credited this period abroad with building her self-esteem and offering her the creative freedom to seriously pursue acting for the first time. After moving back to Sweden, she attended Kungsholmens gymnasium. She had roles in several Stockholm Student Theatre productions before being admitted to the Malmö Theatre Academy in the autumn of 1995. In May 1996, about a year into her studies, her father died of cancer. During her 1997 internship at the Royal Dramatic Theatre, she appeared in their production of August Strindberg's Fadren, directed by Staffan Valdemar Holm.

== Career ==
=== 1999–2002: Career beginnings on stage ===
After completing her education, Millhagen began working at Uppsala City Theatre. There, she appeared in Rebecca Prichard's play Essex Girls, which was adapted into a Swedish setting by Nils Gredeby and staged with a new title of Ur funktion. The play centred on four teenage girls, played by Millhagen, Alexandra Rapaport, Frida Hallgren, and My Bodell. In preparation for their roles, the actresses met with youths from the Uppsala suburb of Gottsunda. The play premiered on 24 September 1999 with direction by Birgitta Englin. The following year, Millhagen was a member of the ensemble for Lage, a musical revue directed by Stefan Böhm at Scalateatern in Stockholm.

In 2001, she returned to the Uppsala City Theatre to portray Loretta in Phyllis Nagy's Las Vegas. The production, directed by Dritëro Kasapi, marked the first time the play had been staged in Sweden. Pia Huss of Dagens Nyheter praised Millhagen's performance as "remarkably good". (Note: Swedish: anmärkningsvärt bra) She had a supporting role in another Englin-directed work: Sophocles' Ancient Greek tragedy Electra, which premiered on International Women's Day. Millhagen and Magdalena Eshaya played the title character's best friends, Cissi and Linda. In addition to showings in Uppsala, the production made a guest appearance at the Royal Dramatic Theatre that autumn. She performed at Uppsala City Theatre in Född skyldig, an adaptation of Peter Sichrovsky's book of interviews with the descendants of Nazis. There she played Stefanie, the young granddaughter of a dead SS officer who espouses her own antisemitic beliefs. She also played a supporting role in the television film Beck – Annonsmannen, a thriller installment in the Martin Beck saga.

=== 2003–2008: Film breakthrough and critical success ===
She made her feature film debut in Miffo (2003), directed and written by Daniel Lind Lagerlöf and Malin Lagerlöf, respectively. Millhagen played Carola, a wheelchair user living in a run-down flat with her alcoholic mother, who meets and begins a relationship with Tobias, a sheltered and upper-class minister played by Jonas Karlsson. Millhagen's performance garnered critical praise; both Eva af Geijerstam of Dagens Nyheter and Jens Peterson of Aftonbladet found her first screen performance to be excellent, with Peterson praising her command of the Scanian dialect. Gunnar Rehlin of Variety regarded her as the film's "real find". Millhagen was nominated for a Guldbagge Award for Best Actress for Miffo. In an academic analysis of disability in Swedish cinema, Josefine Wälivaara and Karin Ljuslinder noted Millhagen's Carola as an exception to the typical depiction of disabled characters, because of her portrayal as a fully realised and sexually experienced woman.

In the autumn of 2003, Millhagen returned to the Royal Dramatic Theatre to perform in Anders Paulin's experimental staging of Bertolt Brecht's Mother Courage and Her Children on the Målarsalen stage. She played Kattrin, the mute daughter of Stina Ekblad's Mother Courage. The production received a mixed review overall from Ingegärd Waaranperä of Dagens Nyheter; she found the experimental direction unsuccessful but wrote that Millhagen's portrayal was convincing and impactful. Millhagen played Siri von Essen in Ellen Lamm's 2004 staging of the Henning Mankell play Valpen at Strindberg's Intimate Theatre. For Expressen, Margareta Sörenson wrote that the characterisation of Millhagen's Siri as a cold and calculating figure was bordering on caricature.

In the short film Rubinbröllop (2005), she and Henrik Rafaelsen played a young couple who agree to pretend they are still together for a parent's anniversary celebration. She collaborated again with Lagerlöfs for Road to Italy (2005), where she played the lead role of Ylva, a woman who learns about her husband's affair right before taking her choir group on a trip. Her performance was commended by Rehlin in Variety and Peterson in Aftonbladet. She played Isabella in Yannis Houvardas's production of William Shakespeare's Measure for Measure at the Royal Dramatic Theatre, which was translated into Swedish by Göran O. Eriksson. Anna Swärdh, a scholar from Karlstad University, noted a distinctive performance choice she made during the play's notoriously ambiguous ending; rather than conveying opposition to the Duke's marriage proposal, Millhagen's Isabella turned toward the audience to display a "beaming smile". Her performance was negatively received by Leif Zern in Dagens Nyheter. Suggesting she may have been miscast, he argued that her vocal delivery obscured the character's emotional depth.

She played Greta in 27 sekundmeter snö, a two-part miniseries based on Kjerstin Göransson-Ljungman's mystery novel of the same name, which was released on DVD in December 2005 followed by a SVT broadcast the following January. In Mästerverket, which premiered in November, she co-starred as Sara, the wife of an idealistic young priest whose idea to commission a church ceiling painting upends their rural community. Millhagen also participated in two productions at the Royal Dramatic Theatre in 2006. First, she played Gertrud in I skuggan av Hamlet by Irena Kraus. Second, she played the title role in Frank Wedekind's Lulu, translated into Swedish by Ulf Peter Hallberg and directed by Ole Anders Tandberg. In a review for Dagens Nyheter, Waaranperä described Millhagen's Lulu as a "strong, modern" character interpretation centred on the "longing for a lost self". (Note: Swedish: stark, modern...längtan efter ett förlorat jag) In November, she received the Gunn Wållgren Award, an annual scholarship given to dramatic and lyrical performers. The award justification praised her portrayal of varied types of roles.

In 2007, Millhagen appeared in Sam Shepard's Buried Child, known in Swedish as Hem till gården, which premiered at the Elverket stage of the Royal Dramatic Theatre. The production marked her first of many theatre collaborations with director Stefan Larsson. In 2008, she played Lydia Stille opposite Gustaf Skarsgård's Arvid Stjärnblom in Lagerlöf's stage directing debut of The Serious Game at Stockholm City Theatre. Although the production itself received mixed reviews, Millhagen's performance was praised by critics. Jenny Aschenbrenner of Dagens Nyheter wrote that it was her "accurately portrayed rebellion and vulnerability that cuts through the game and makes it serious". (Note: Swedish: träffsäkert gestaltade uppror och sårbarhet som skär genom leken och gör den allvarsam) In Expressen, Nils Schwartz criticised the direction and Skarsgård's performance but felt that Millhagen had excelled in her character interpretation. On screen the same year, she played Li in the SVT drama series Häxdansen, which centred on a women's football team in a small community where accused witches had once been burned at the stake. She then had a supporting role in Maria Blom's black comedy film Fishy (2008), as the protagonist's best friend Mio. Hedvig Weibull of Borås Tidning said that Millhagen "[brightened] up the film like a bold red lipstick". (Note: Swedish: piffar upp filmen som ett knallrött läppstift)

=== 2009–2015: Establishment at the Royal Dramatic Theatre ===
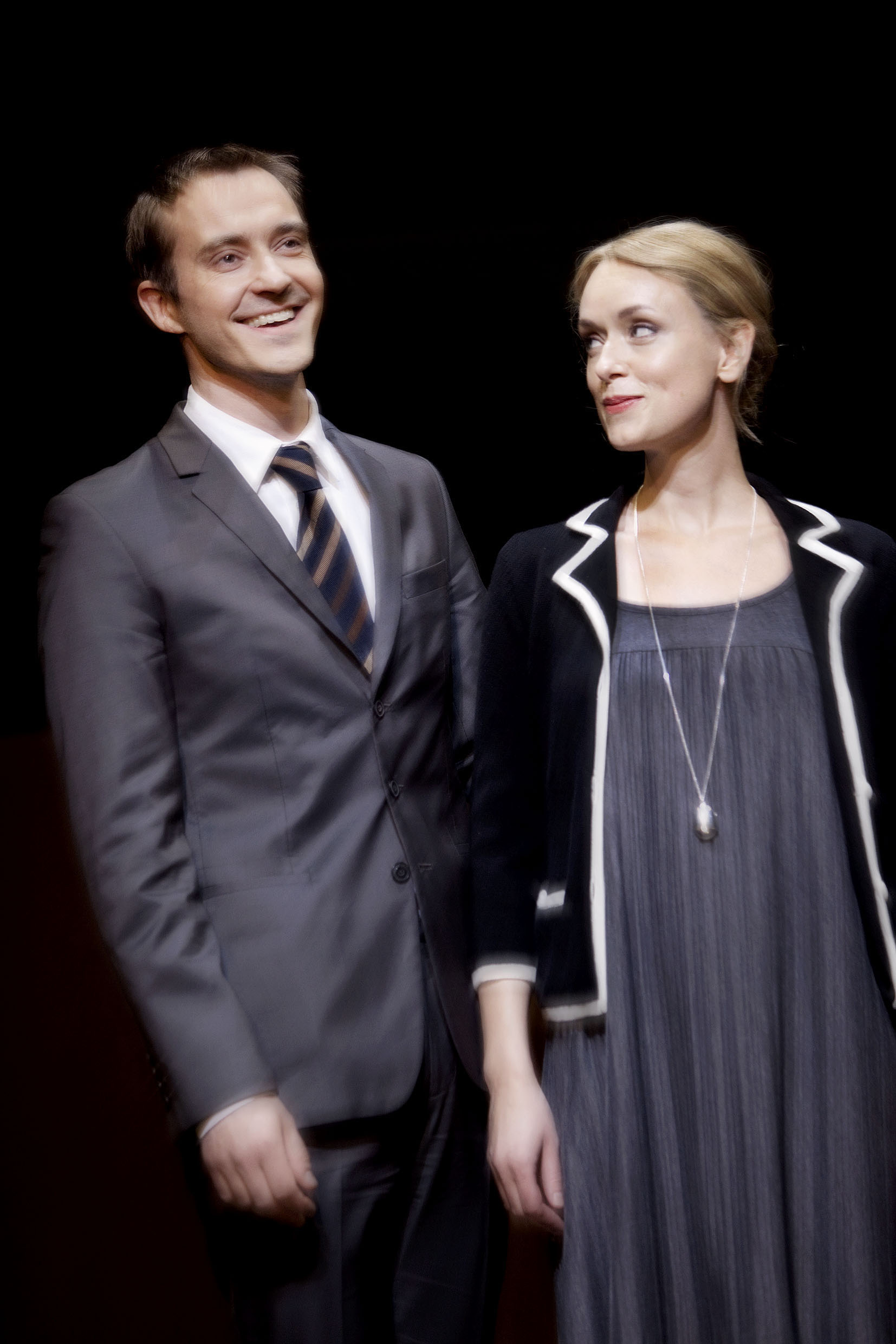
Karlsson and Millhagen featured in Scenes from a Marriage at the Royal Dramatic Theatre (2009)

The Royal Dramatic Theatre added six actors, including Millhagen, to its permanent ensemble in May 2009. Later that year, she and Jonas Karlsson starred as Marianne and Johan in a Larsson-directed production of Ingmar Bergman's 1973 miniseries Scenes from a Marriage. Bergman had simplified the story while adapting it for stage during his time in Munich. This play version had thus not been previously shown in Sweden before the premiere in August 2009. Expressen theatre critic Sörenson praised the performances of both Millhagen and Karlsson. After 60 sold-out showings at the Royal Dramatic Theatre, a touring production was announced, featuring Karlsson and Millhagen, in association with the National Swedish Touring Theatre. Later that year, Millhagen again appeared on the Royal Dramatic Theatre's main stage in a production of Ingmar Bergman's Autumn Sonata. The production, which was directed by Larsson, marked the first time the 1978 film had ever been presented as a play in Sweden. Millhagen played Charlotte's disabled daughter, Helena.

Millhagen returned to the Royal Dramatic Theatre in 2010 to portray Karen in a staging of Tracy Letts's family drama August: Osage County; the production was reported to be Larsson's farewell directorial effort at the venue before taking over at the Aarhus Theatre. The following year, she played Célimène in Molière's The Misanthrope at the Royal Dramatic Theatre. Millhagen was next involved with Sveriges Radio Drama's two-part adaptation of Stendhal's The Red and the Black. Lars Ring of Svenska Dagbladet praised the production and singled out Millhagen's performance as the protagonist's first and last lover. She appeared in a stage adaptation of Fanny and Alexander by the Royal Dramatic Theatre. It had an American premiere at the Kennedy Center from 7–9 March 2013, as part of the Nordic Cool Festival. She had a leading role as cardiologist Fanny Molander in Molanders (2013). The series, which focused on the titular family moving from Stockholm to Alingsås, received strong viewership and good reviews but was not renewed for a second season. Near the end of the year, she was one of several recipients of the Carl Åkermark Award, given to artists involved in Swedish theatre.

She played one of the lead roles in Jane Magnusson's Cupcake, which won Best Short Film at the Warsaw Film Festival in 2014. The same year, Millhagen starred as Rebekka West opposite Jonas Malmsjö in Henrik Ibsen's Rosmersholm at the Royal Dramatic Theatre, directed by Larsson. Theatre critic Maria Edström found the minimalist production initially compelling, but concluded the performances ultimately failed to build effectively toward the play's tragic conclusion. In January 2015, Millhagen was awarded with a Litteris et Artibus royal medal by King Carl XVI Gustaf, in recognition of outstanding contributions to theatre. Next month, she played the Comtesse de Saint-Fond in Madame de Sade at the Royal Dramatic Theatre. After about a week, Millhagen replaced Maria Bonnevie in the titular role.

=== 2016–present: Continued work on stage and screen ===
In 2016, she played the titular role in Medea at the Royal Dramatic Theatre. Maina Arvas of Dagens Nyheter characterised Millhagen as the driving force of the production. Next year, she again played the titular role in Tobias Theorell's large-scale production of Anna Karenina on the main stage of the Royal Dramatic Theatre, based on Helen Edmundson's stage adaptation. Ring felt the production could not overcome a fragmented script, although he praised Millhagen's performance as "magnificent". (Note: Swedish: magnifik) Meanwhile on screen, she had roles in Helena Bergström's dramatic comedy film Mending Hugo's Heart and in the series Veni Vidi Vici. In 2018, she appeared in the miniseries Sisters 1968. The same year, she starred as Ann in Larsson's production of Lars Norén's Höst och vinter on the Royal Dramatic Theatre's small stage. Co-starring alongside Alexandra Rapaport and Ingela Olsson, Millhagen played the younger sister, who blames her parents for her neuroticism, and serves as a catalyst for the play's family conflict. Reviewing the production, Ring praised the play and noted that Millhagen's performance conveyed Ann's lingering bourgeois roots despite a working-class job.

Millhagen played Blanche DuBois in Tennessee Williams's A Streetcar Named Desire, which premiered on 29 March 2019 during a period of turmoil at the Royal Dramatic Theatre, as the theatre's artistic director faced allegations of domestic violence. Because A Streetcar Named Desire involves themes of spousal abuse and rape, Millhagen felt it was a difficult situation but also one that encouraged a sense of camaraderie amongst the cast. The production was ultimately a critical and commercial success. Leif Zern of Dagens Nyheter, who felt it was one of the best performances at the theatre in years, highlighted Millhagen's performance as "continuously captivating and gut-wrenching". (Note: Swedish: oavbrutet fängslande och gastkramande) A Streetcar Named Desire earned her the Thalia Prize from Svenska Dagbladet. The same year, she appeared in Richard Hobert's Faroese drama The Birdcatcher's Son (2019). In a generally negative review for Dagens Nyheter, Johan Croneman praised Millhagen's "brilliant" depiction of a "lively and domineering innkeeper". (Note: Swedish: strålande...livliga och dominanta värdshusvärdinnan) She also lent her voice to play Shenzi in the Swedish dub of The Lion King.

In February 2020, Millhagen reunited with Larsson for another Williams play, starring as Maggie in Cat on a Hot Tin Roof. Dagens Nyheter critic Per Svensson regarded her performance as a "masterpiece". (Note: Swedish: mästarprov) During theatre closures associated with the COVID-19 pandemic, Millhagen recorded audiobooks before returning to performing in front of a live audience with a reprisal of Cat on a Hot Tin Roof at the Maximteatern. She reprised her role as Maggie opposite Linus Wahlgren's Brick. In November of the following year, she appeared in another Maximteatern production, this time playing Hedda in Lars Norén's marital-strife drama Så enkel är kärleken. It featured Millhagen and Larsson as a self-involved couple whose relationship problems surface as they comment on an alcohol-fueled argument between their friends (played by Mikael Persbrandt and Ingela Olsson). She appeared in the first season of the crime drama Bäckström as prosecutor Hanna Hwass. She also had a minor role in the first season of Young Royals in 2021, playing Felice's mother Smysan. She starred opposite Rolf Lassgård as a divorcing couple clearing out their summer home in Love Proof (2022). In a review for Svenska Dagbladet, Karoline Eriksson panned the film, noting that while Millhagen and Lassgård were both capable actors, the script held the film back.

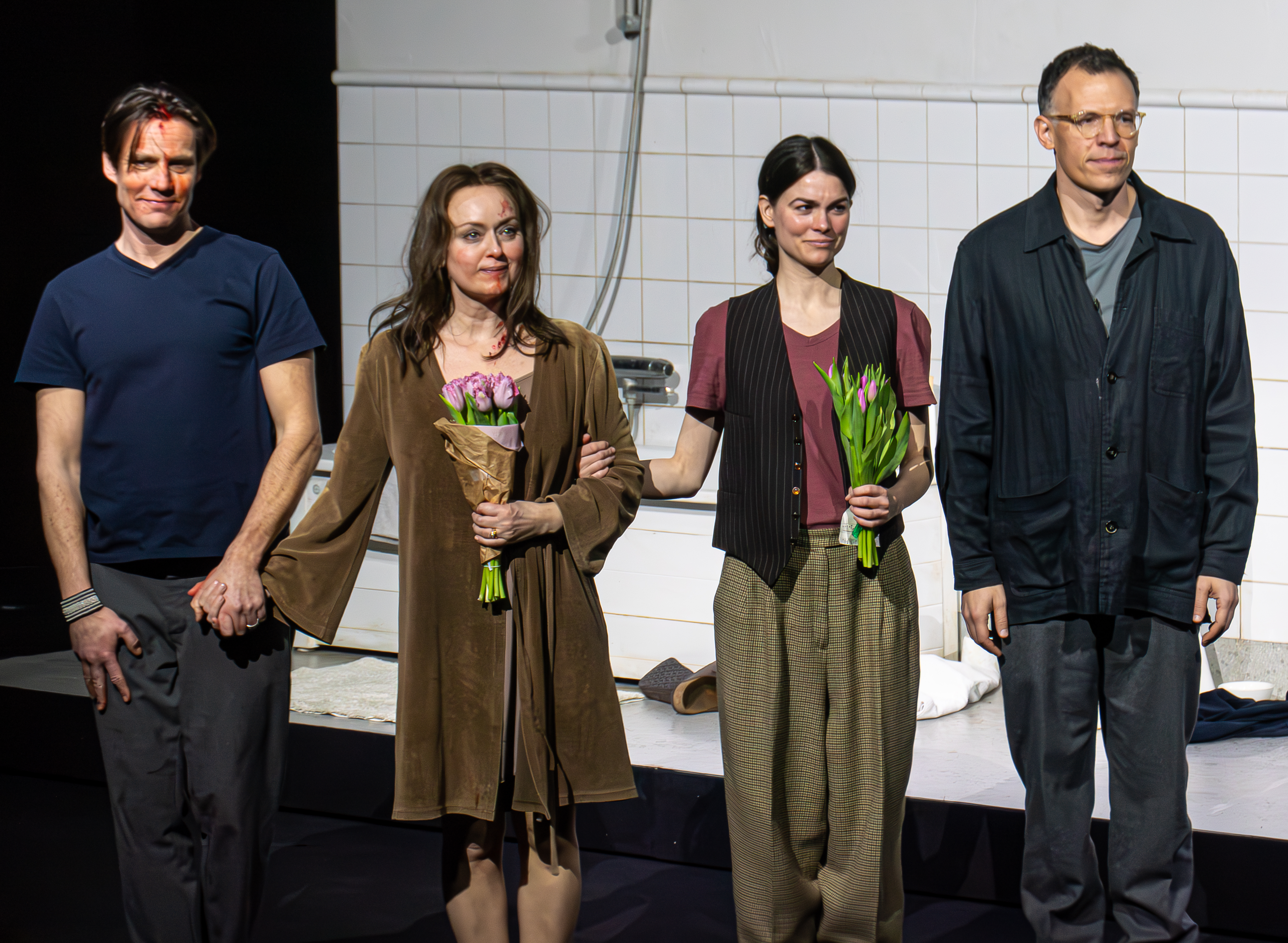
Little Eyolf cast at the Royal Dramatic Theatre in 2024 from left to right: Erik Ehn, Livia Millhagen, Karin Franz Körlof, and Hannes Meidal

She portrayed Rita in a production of Little Eyolf at the Royal Dramatic Theatre in 2024. In a somewhat mixed review for Dagens Nyheter, Maina Arvas highlighted Millhagen's performance, writing that her Rita was "absurd, jealous, shameless, human, and funny, an example of what can be done with Ibsen's female roles". (Note: Swedish: absurd, svartsjuk, skamlös, mänsklig och rolig, ett exempel på vad som går att göra med Ibsens kvinnoroller)

In 2025, Millhagen appeared alongside French actor Denis Lavant in John Skoog's Cold War drama film Redoubt. The film, which follows an eccentric Scanian farmer fortifying his house against a perceived enemy threat, premiered at the San Sebastián International Film Festival. The same year, Millhagen appeared in two Royal Dramatic Theatre productions. First, she was in Alice Birch's [BLANK]. The play includes 100 scenes about the women interacting with violence in various ways. Director Maria Åberg selected 24 for the performance, which marked the first time it was staged in Sweden. Then Millhagen appeared in Pelicoträttegången, a four-hour theatre performance about the Pelicot rape case trial directed by Milo Rau. She and Melinda Kinnaman were situated in front of a large ensemble, with Millhagen reading stage directions and Kinnaman performing multiple court-related parts.

== Personal life ==
She is married to Oscar Norbeck, a psychiatrist. They have two children.

== Acting credits ==
=== Film ===
Year	Title	Role	Notes	Ref.
2003	Miffo	Carola	Main role	
2005	Rubinbröllop	Helena Persson	Short film	
2005	Road to Italy	Ylva	Main role	
2008	Fishy	Mio		
2008	Everlasting Moments			
2009	Wallander – Prästen	Åsa Nordström	Direct-to-video	
2009	Oskar, Oskar	Sonja		
2014	Cupcake	Karin	Short film	
2015	The Good Dinosaur		Voice (Swedish dub)	
2017	Mending Hugo's Heart	Hugo's mother		
2019	The Lion King	Shenzi	Voice (Swedish dub)	
2019	The Birdcatcher's Son	Livia		
2021	Raya and the Last Dragon		Voice (Swedish dub)	
2022	Love Proof	Marie		
2025	Redoubt			

=== Television ===
Year	Title	Role	Notes	Ref.
2002	Beck – Annonsmannen		Television film	
2005	27 sekundmeter snö	Greta	Television miniseries	
2006	Mästerverket	Sara		
2008	Häxdansen	Li		
2013	Molanders	Fanny Molander		
2017	Veni Vidi Vici	Jonna		
2018	Sisters 1968	Ulla	Miniseries	
2020	Bäckström	Hanna Hwass	Season 1	
2021	Young Royals	Smysan	Season 1	

=== Theatre ===
Year	Title	Role	Venue	Notes	Ref.
1994	Skuggan av Mart		Teater Blå at Folkkulturcentrum	Stockholm Student Theatre	
1995	Woyzeck		Teater Blå at Folkkulturcentrum	Stockholm Student Theatre	
1997	Fadren		Royal Dramatic Theatre	Målarsalen stage	
1999	Ur Funktion		Uppsala City Theatre		
2000	Lage		Scalateatern		
2001	Las Vegas	Loretta	Uppsala City Theatre		
2001	Electra		Uppsala City Theatre		
2002	Född skyldig	Stefanie	Uppsala City Theatre	Small stage	
2003	Ett litet drömspel		Royal Dramatic Theatre	Lejonkulan stage	
2003	Mother Courage and Her Children	Kattrin	Royal Dramatic Theatre	Målarsalen stage	
2004	Valpen	Siri von Essen	Strindberg's Intimate Theatre		
2005	Measure for Measure	Isabella	Royal Dramatic Theatre		
2006	I skuggan av Hamlet	Gertrud	Royal Dramatic Theatre	Lejonkulan stage	
2006	Lulu	Lulu	Royal Dramatic Theatre		
2007	Buried Child		Royal Dramatic Theatre		
2007	Fördold	Metta	Royal Dramatic Theatre		
2008	The Serious Game	Lydia Stille	Stockholm City Theatre	Small stage	
2008	Den ömhet jag är värd	Sanna	Royal Dramatic Theatre		
2009	Scenes from a Marriage	Marianne	Royal Dramatic Theatre	Small stage	
2009	Autumn Sonata	Helena	Royal Dramatic Theatre	Main stage	
2010	August: Osage County	Karen	Royal Dramatic Theatre		
2011	The Misanthrope	Celimène	Royal Dramatic Theatre		
2012	The Red and the Black		Sveriges Radio Drama		
2013	Fanny and Alexander	Emelie Ekdahl	Kennedy Center	Nordic Cool Festival	
2014	Rosmersholm	Rebekka West	Royal Dramatic Theatre		
2015	Madame de Sade	Multiple	Royal Dramatic Theatre		
2016	Medea	Medea	Royal Dramatic Theatre		
2017	Anna Karenina	Anna Karenina	Royal Dramatic Theatre	Main stage	
2018	Höst och vinter	Ann	Royal Dramatic Theatre	Small stage	
2019	A Streetcar Named Desire	Blanche DuBois	Royal Dramatic Theatre	Small stage	
2020	Cat on a Hot Tin Roof	Maggie	Maximteatern		
2021	Cat on a Hot Tin Roof	Maggie	Maximteatern		
2022	Så enkel är kärleken	Hedda	Maximteatern		
2024	Little Eyolf	Rita	Royal Dramatic Theatre		
2025	[BLANK]		Royal Dramatic Theatre	Main stage	
2025	Pelicoträttegången		Royal Dramatic Theatre		

== Awards and nominations ==
Year	Award	Work	Result	Ref.
2003	Guldbagge Award for Best Actress in a Leading Role	Miffo	Nominated	
2006	Gunn Wållgren Award		Won	
2013	Carl Åkermark Award		Won	
2015	Litteris et Artibus		Won	
2019	Svenska Dagbladet Thaliapriset	A Streetcar Named Desire	Won	
