= Road to Italy =

2005 Swedish comedy-drama film

- Promotional poster
- Swedish: Buss till Italien
- Directed by: Daniel Lind Lagerlöf
- Written by: Malin Lagerlöf
- Starring: Livia Millhagen; Karl Linnertorp; Adam Pålsson
- Release date: 16 December 2005
- Running time: 89 minutes
- Country: Sweden
- Language: Swedish

Road to Italy (Swedish: Buss till Italien, lit. 'Bus to Italy') is a 2005 Swedish comedy-drama film directed by Daniel Lind Lagerlöf and written by Malin Lagerlöf. The film follows choir director Ylva (Livia Millhagen), who leaves on a trip to Italy shortly after discovering her husband having sex with their teenage babysitter. The film was shot on an actual journey in chronological order, with shooting locations in Sweden, Germany, and Italy. It premiered in theatres on 16 December 2005 and received generally mixed reviews from critics. While the film's plot received criticism, Millhagen's performance was praised.

== Plot ==
Ylva, a church choir director and mother-of-two, returns home early from rehearsal to find her husband having sex with their teenage babysitter. After confronting him at her 35th birthday party, she leaves on a previously planned bus trip to Italy with her choir. On the trip are two 17-year old boys, Erik and Ruben, who are attracted to Ylva.

== Cast ==
- Livia Millhagen as Ylva
- Karl Linnertorp as Erik
- Adam Pålsson as Ruben
- Anna Lyons as Ia
- Johan Holmberg as Rikard
- Mats Andersson as Svante
- Marie Tilander as Lillemor

== Production ==
Director Daniel Lind Lagerlöf expressed that the idea for the film came from his own experience when he was 16. He worked on the story with his wife, screenwriter Malin Lagerlöf. The pair had previously collaborated on the films Breaking Out (1999), Making Babies (2001), and Miffo (2003). The film was shot on an actual journey in chronological order, beginning in Trollhättan in May 2005. Parts were shot in Sweden, on a ferry to Germany, along an autobahn, and in Domodossola.

== Release ==
Road to Italy premiered in theaters on 16 December 2005.

== Reception ==
The film earned an average rating of 2.8/5 on the Swedish review aggregator site Kritiker, based on 8 critics' reviews. It received a generally positive review from Gunnar Rehlin in Variety; he called it a "charming dramedy" with a strong lead in Livia Millhagen. He also felt digital video was used somewhat successfully to create an "unvarnished" effect. The plot was strongly criticised by Malin Krutmeijer in a review for Helsingborgs Dagblad; she described the film as lacking a central storyline or developed characters. She also deemed it a "shameless and hollow rip-off" (skamlös och stum rip-off) of Kay Pollak's As It Is in Heaven (2004). Jeanette Gentele of Svenska Dagbladet also felt the characters and their motivations were not sufficiently explored, and critiqued the film's conclusion as overly fanciful. She concluded that without Millhagen's performance, Road to Italy would have been a complete failure. Jens Peterson of Aftonbladet felt the film lacked focus as a result of too many subplots, but commended Millhagen's performance.
