= Per Mattsson =

Swedish actor (1948–2025)

Per Berndt Roland Mattsson (22 July 1948 – 11 September 2025) was a Swedish actor.

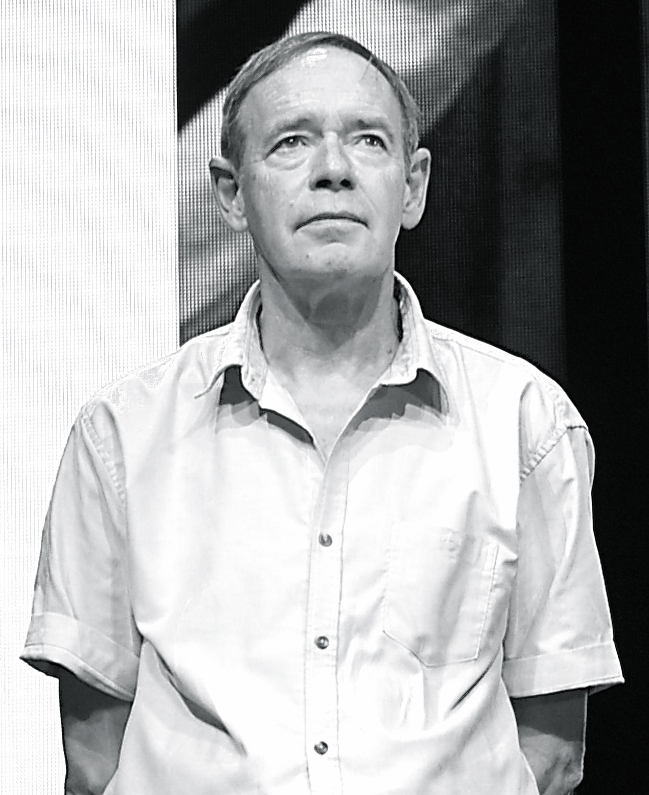
Mattsson in 2014

== Early life and education ==
Mattsson was born in Västerås on 22 July 1948. He began working in amateur theatre in Västerås and was educated from 1967 to 1970 at the Scenskolan in Stockholm.

== Career ==
Mattsson worked at the Stockholm City Theatre for a year before he was employed by the Royal Dramatic Theatre in 1972, to which he remained largely loyal, except for the years 1977–1979 when he played Mackie the Knife in The Threepenny Opera and the musical Cabaret at Helsingborg City Theatre. Some of his notable roles include Leander in The Rushed, the robber Jesper in People and Robbers in Kamomilla City, David in The Night Is the Mother of the Day, Albany in King Lear, Jason in Medea, the lawyer in A Doll's House and the pastor in The Father, and he worked with directors such as Ingmar Bergman, Alf Sjöberg, and Staffan Valdemar Holm. He appeared in film and TV productions such as Janne Halldoff's The Wedding, Arne Mattsson's Dirty Fingers, Hans Alfredson's The Time of the Wolf, Ingmar Bergman's Fanny and Alexander, amongst others.

== Awards ==
Mattsson was awarded Svenska Dagbladet's Thalia Prize in 1983 for his role in The Night is the Mother of the Day. In 2014, he was awarded the Gunn Wållgren Scholarship.

In 2015, he was the winner of the Eugene O'Neill Award.

== Death ==
Mattsson died on 11 September 2025, at the age of 77.
