= Eugene O'Neill Award =

Swedish award for stage acting

The Eugene O'Neill Award (Swedish: O'Neill-stipendiet) is one of Sweden's finest awards for stage actors. It is a scholarship for actors at the Swedish theater. It has been awarded annually by the Royal Dramatic Theatre since 1956.

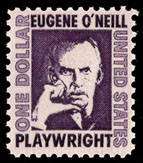
Eugene O'Neill U. S. Postage (1967)

== History ==
Eugene Gladstone O'Neill (1888–1953) was a noted American playwright. He was a four winner of the Pulitzer Prize for drama and was the Nobel laureate for literature in 1936.

Just before Eugene O'Neill died in 1953, he drew up a will in which he gave the then not yet staged play Long Day's Journey Into Night (written in 1941) to Sweden's Royal Dramatic Theatre, along with exclusive first performance rights. The play had its world premiere in Stockholm on February 2, 1956. The gesture was as thanks for the Royal Dramatic Theatre's continued interest in staging his plays (more so than any other theatre in the world), and for Swedish appreciation of his work long before he became recognized internationally, or in his home country.

Later his widow American stage and film actress Carlotta Monterey (1888– 1970), also gave the Royal Dramatic Theatre the performing rights to A Touch of the Poet (1942), Hughie (1942) and More Stately Mansions (posthumous). She refused staging fees for his plays in Sweden, provided that 8% of the royalties from the revenues of each performance were given to the Eugene O'Neill Memory Fund, which manages the money for the Eugene O'Neill Award.

The scholarship is bestowed annually on the 16th of October, the anniversary of O'Neill's birthday. In accordance with O'Neill's own wishes, it is given to "highly deserving actors of the Royal Dramatic Theatre". Recipients of the award are decided by Dramaten's board of directors. As an extra honour to Eugene O'Neill, the first award was granted to the two actors who played the leading parts of James and Mary Tyrone in the original staging of Long Day's Journey Into Night at the Royal Dramatic Theatre in February 1956; Lars Hanson (1886–1965) and Inga Tidblad (1901–1975).

== Recipients ==
- 1956 – Lars Hanson and Inga Tidblad
- 1957 – Tora Teje
- 1958 – Anders Henrikson
- 1959 – Gunn Wållgren
- 1960 – Ulf Palme
- 1961 – Eva Dahlbeck
- 1962 – Olof Sandborg
- 1963 – Georg Rydeberg
- 1964 – Sif Ruud
- 1965 – Holger Löwenadler
- 1966 – Gertrud Fridh
- 1967 – Olof Widgren
- 1968 – Irma Christenson
- 1969 – Jan-Olof Strandberg
- 1970 – Birgitta Valberg
- 1971 – Anders Ek
- 1972 – Anita Björk
- 1973 – Olle Hilding
- 1974 – Margaretha Krook
- 1975 – Ernst-Hugo Järegård
- 1976 – Toivo Pawlo
- 1977 – Ulla Sjöblom
- 1978 – Ingvar Kjellson
- 1980 – Allan Edwall
- 1981 – Aino Taube
- 1982 – Jarl Kulle
- 1983 – Ulf Johanson
- 1984 – Margaretha Byström
- 1985 – Sven Lindberg
- 1986 – Mona Malm
- 1987 – Hans Strååt
- 1988 – Bibi Andersson and Jan Malmsjö
- 1989 – Gunnel Lindblom
- 1990 – Thommy Berggren
- 1991 – Börje Ahlstedt
- 1992 – Erland Josephson
- 1993 – Lena Endre
- 1994 – Lennart Hjulström
- 1995 – Stina Ekblad
- 1996 – Per Myrberg
- 1997 – Krister Henriksson
- 1998 – Marie Göranzon
- 1999 – Keve Hjelm
- 2000 – Lil Terselius
- 2001 – Örjan Ramberg
- 2002 – Pernilla August
- 2003 – Björn Granath
- 2004 – Irene Lindh
- 2005 – Reine Brynolfsson
- 2006 – Lena Nyman
- 2007 – Rolf Skoglund
- 2008 – Anita Wall
- 2009 – Hans Klinga
- 2010 – Malin Ek
- 2011 – Johan Rabaeus
- 2012 – Kristina Törnqvist
- 2013 – Pontus Gustafsson
- 2014 – Thérèse Brunnander
- 2015 – Per Mattsson
- 2016 – Melinda Kinnaman
- 2017 – Jonas Karlsson
- 2018 – Ingela Olsson
- 2019 – Erik Ehn
- 2020 – Marie Richardson

== See also ==
- Eugene O'Neill Theatre
