= Ulla Smidje =

Swedish actress (1925–1972)

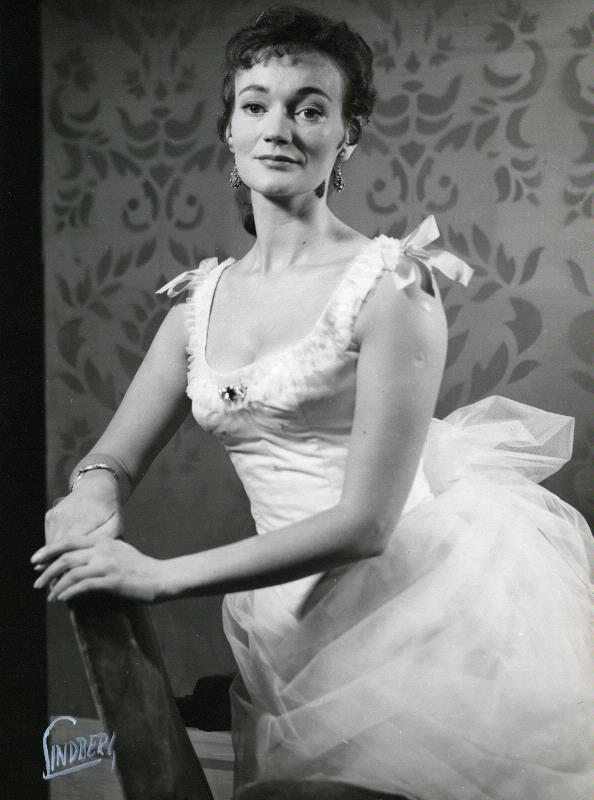
- Smidje in 1955
- Born: Ulla Vendela Smidje; 26 December 1925; Ullared, Sweden
- Died: 28 November 1972 (aged 46); Gothenburg, Sweden
- Education: Royal Dramatic Training Academy
- Occupation: Actress
- Spouse: Anders Sundberg (m. 1945; died 1969)
- Children: 1
- Awards: Thaliapriset (1961)

Ulla Smidje (26 December 1925 – 28 November 1972) was a Swedish actress of stage and screen. She received the Thaliapriset in recognition of contributions to theatre. Born in Ullared, Halland County, she moved to Stockholm where she became a member of Per-Axel Branner's Nya Teatern ensemble, before being admitted to the Royal Dramatic Training Academy. She appeared in stage productions at the Royal Dramatic Theatre, Helsingborg City Theatre, and Gothenburg City Theatre, as well as radio theatre.

== Early life ==
Ulla Vendela Smidje was born on 26 December 1925 in Ullared, Halland County, Sweden. Her parents were Sven Carlsson, a master blacksmith, and Elsa (née Bengtsson). After completing her realexamen in Varberg in 1942, she moved to Stockholm. There she took theatre lessons while working at Postgirot.

== Career ==
She joined Per-Axel Branner's theatre group at the Nya Teatern. She remained in the group for about a year and participated in a number of productions. One of her roles while affiliated with this ensemble was a staging of Arthur Schnitzler's Liebelei, directed by Tord Stål. She played a naïve young woman who overestimates the seriousness of her relationship with a dragoon officer. In a review for Dagens Nyheter, theatre critic Sten af Geijerstam found fault with most technical aspects of her performance yet also praised her stage presence. In September, she was one of eight students accepted to the Royal Dramatic Training Academy. Her incoming cohort included Per Gerhard, Ingvar Kjellson, Jarl Kulle, Arne Ragneborn, Brita Billsten, Marianne Karlbeck, and Märta Torén. She appeared in several Royal Dramatic Theatre plays while studying at the acting school. She had an early role was in Göran Gentele's production of John M. Synge's The Playboy of the Western World. She then played Magali in Julien Luchaire's Ungdom I fjällen; it was put on by the students, with Arne Ragneborn directing. During her second year, she received a scholarship from the Helge Andersson Johnson fund, which she intended to use for a trip to Denmark. She was also cast in the Royal Dramatic Theatre's opening autumn production of Maxwell Anderson's Joan of Lorraine.

She made her film debut in Lars Hård, a drama directed by Hampe Faustman based on the novel by Jan Fridegård, who also wrote the script. It premiered on 30 August 1948. She then played Eva in Alf Sjöberg's radio adaptation of the August Strindberg play Master Olof. She played Lizzie, the lead role in Jean-Paul Sartre's one-act play The Respectful Prostitute. Critic Ebbe Linde felt the production was largely unsuccessful and that some of her important lines were fumbled, though he placed the main blame on the direction rather than on Smidje's performance. In 1949, she graduated from the theatre academy. That year she also lent her voice to multiple radio theatre productions: A Dream Play, Everyman, and Eld av eld, the latter a romantic drama written by Lars Ahlin and adapted by Olof Molander. She then returned to the stage for a student production of Zachris Topelius's Sanningens pärla at the Royal Dramatic Theatre's small stage. She and Marianne Lindberg played a duo of pious children, which was well-received by Sven Barthel in Dagens Nyheter; he wrote that they "[struck] a good fairy tale tone" (träffar en god sagoton). She then played Jane Seymour in Anne of the Thousand Days. The play, originally written in English by the American Maxwell Anderson, was translated to Swedish by Einar Malm and was staged on the main stage, with direction by Olof Molander. Meanwhile on screen, she played Cecilia in Only a Mother (1949), written and directed by Sjöberg based on Ivar Lo-Johansson's novel. Her next film appearance was in While the City Sleeps (1950), where she played the protagonist's sister, Asta.

She appeared opposite Lars Ekborg in a 1951 radio production of Pär Lagerkvist's Mannen utan själ. Karin Schultz, radio critic for Dagens Nyheter, regarded her performance as significantly weaker than her co-star's, though noted that her restrained tone was effective in some moments. Smidje then worked alongside Stig Olin in the lead roles of Lars Helgesson's radio play Ringar i vattnet. Directed by Henrik Dyfverman with music by Nils Castegren, the broadcast served as the premiere for a Sveriges Radio experimental theatre series. Schultz wrote that Smidje performed "softly and beautifully" (mjukt och vackert).

After four years contracted at the Royal Dramatic Theatre, she felt she would find more substantial roles outside of Stockholm, so she moved to Helsingborg. She was a member of the Helsingborg City Theatre from 1953 to 1957. Afterwards, she joined the ensemble at Gothenburg City Theatre. In 1960, she appeared as the general’s wife in a Gothenburg City Theatre production of Jean Anouilh's play L'Hurluberlu. Her performance was praised, although the reviewer noted an apparent inconsistency in her character's name in the programme (Algaë) versus in the play itself (Marianne). Next, she played the chorus leader in a radio theatre production of The Trojan Women by Euripides. Smidje found significant success the following year in a production in Ted Willis's Hot Summer Night. She portrayed Nell Palmer, a working-class housewife whose world is upended when her daughter wants to marry a Black man. The role, which involved plentiful hoarse screaming and brandishing of a knife, earned her praise from critics, who felt her performance had made a violently prejudiced character somehow sympathetic.

She was awarded Svenska Dagbladet's Thaliapriset in December 1961. In its official motivation, the awarding committee recognised her work in Gothenburg, noting that her varied role interpretations were characterised by "a beautiful professional ambition, by a patient and stubborn pursuit of authenticity and truth, consistently at the expense of more easily won effects" (en vacker yrkesambition, aven tälmodig och envis strävan efter äkthet och sanning, genomgående på bekostnad av mera lättvunna effekter). She was featured in The Devil (1963), an Italian sex-themed comedy directed by Gian Luigi Polidoro also known as To Bed or Not to Bed and Amore in Stockholm. The film jointly won the Golden Bear at the 13th Berlin International Film Festival, alongside the Japanese film Bushido, Samurai Saga. In 1965, she participated in a Gothenburg City Theatre tour of Werner Aspenström's Mattan, which was scheduled to visit the Swedish Theatre in Helsinki as well as Turku and Vaasa.

She appeared in The Emigrants (1971), a film based on Vilhelm Moberg's series of the same name, which follows poor Swedes in the mid-19th century who decide to leave Småland in search of better fortunes in Minnesota. She played Inga-Lena; her character's death en route to America shakes her devout and optimistic minister husband, Danjel (played by Allan Edwall). The following year, she was in a radio play of Varför?, written by Finnish playwright Meeri Hakala, which dealt with the social stigma surrounding epilepsy.

== Personal life and death ==
She married Anders Sundberg in 1945, and was occasionally credited as Ulla Smidje-Sundberg thereafter. They had a daughter born around 1948, who appeared in Only a Mother at two months old, playing a newborn boy, alongside her mother. Her husband died in 1969 at the age of 52. She died in Gothenburg on 28 November 1972 at the age of 46.

== Acting credits ==
=== Film ===
Year	Title	Role	Notes	Ref.
1948	Lars Hård			
1949	Only a Mother	Cecilia		
1950	While the City Sleeps	Asta		
1963	The Devil	Parson's wife		
1971	The Emigrants	Inga-Lena		

=== Theatre ===
Year	Title	Role	Venue	Notes	Ref.
1946	Liebelei (Älskog)		Nya Teatern		
1946	Over Ævne (Över förmåga)		Nya Teatern		
1947	The Playboy of the Western World (Hjälten på den gröna ön)		Royal Dramatic Theatre	Small stage	
1948	Ungdom i fjällen	Magali	Royal Dramatic Theatre	Small stage	
1948	Joan of Lorraine (Johanna från Lothringen)		Royal Dramatic Theatre		
1948	Master Olof (Mäster Olof)	Eva	—N/a	Radio play	
1948	The Respectful Prostitute (Den respektfulla skökan)	Lizzie	Royal Dramatic Theatre	Small stage	
1949	A Dream Play (Ett drömspel)	Edit		Radio play	
1949	Everyman (Det gamla spelet om Envar förnyat)	The debtor's wife	—N/a	Radio play	
1949	Eld av eld	Gertrud Berg	—N/a	Radio play	
1949	Sanningens pärla		Royal Dramatic Theatre	Small stage	
1949	Anne of the Thousand Days (En dag ev tusen)	Jane Seymour	Royal Dramatic Theatre	Main stage	
1951	Mannen utan själ	—N/a		Radio play	
1951	Ringar i vattnet		—N/a	Radio play	
1953	Doña Rosita the Spinster (Fröken Rosita: Blommornas språk)		Royal Dramatic Theatre	Small stage	
1960	L'Hurluberlu (Brumbjörnen)		Gothenburg City Theatre		
1960	The Trojan Women (Trojanskorna)	Chorus leader	—N/a	Radio play	
1961	Hot Summer Night (Värmebölja)	Nell Palmer	Gothenburg City Theatre		
1965	Mattan		Gothenburg City Theatre	Touring production	
1972	Varför?		—N/a	Radio play	

== Awards and nominations ==
Year	Award	Work	Result	Ref.
1961	Svenska Dagbladet Thaliapriset	—N/a	Won	
