= Making Babies =

Making Babies may refer to:

- Making Babies (2001 film), a Swedish film
- Making Babies (2018 film), an American comedy film
- Making Babies (2023 film), a Canadian short comedy-drama film
- Making babies, or human reproduction
