= Woman Without a Face =

1947 film by Gustaf Molander

- Directed by: Gustaf Molander
- Written by: Ingmar Bergman; Gustaf Molander
- Starring: Alf Kjellin; Anita Björk; Gunn Wållgren
- Cinematography: Åke Dahlqvist
- Edited by: Oscar Rosander
- Music by: Julius Jacobsen
- Release date: 16 September 1947
- Running time: 102 minutes
- Country: Sweden
- Language: Swedish

Woman Without a Face (Swedish: Kvinna utan ansikte) is a 1947 Swedish drama film directed by Gustaf Molander and written by Ingmar Bergman.

== Cast ==
- Alf Kjellin as Martin Grandé
- Anita Björk as Frida Grandé
- Gunn Wållgren as Rut Köhler
- Stig Olin as Ragnar Ekberg
- Olof Winnerstrand as Mr. Grandé, Martin's father
- Linnéa Hillberg as Mrs. Grandé, Martin's mother
- Georg Funkquist as Victor
- Marianne Löfgren as Charlotte, Rut's mother
- Åke Grönberg as Sam Svensson
- Sif Ruud as Magda Svensson
