= Maxida Märak =

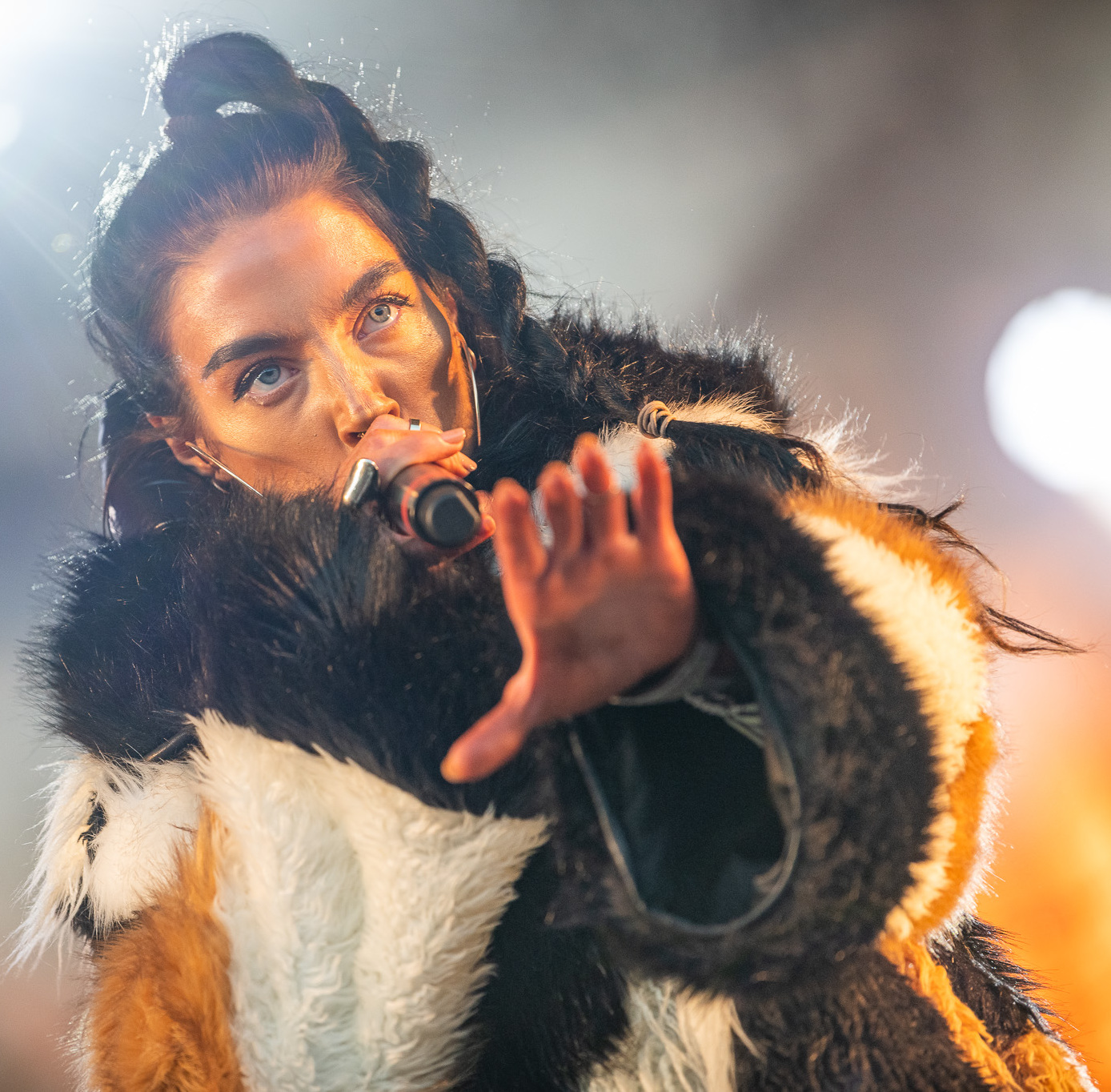
- Märak at Riddu Riđđu, 2019

Background information
- Born: 17 September 1988 (age 38); Stockholm, Sweden
- Origin: Jokkmokk, Sweden
- Genres: Hip hop; joik
- Occupation: Singer

Ida Amanda "Maxida" Märak (born 17 September 1988) is a Swedish-Sámi joik singer, hip hop musician, actress and activist. Märak is a human rights activist with a special interest in the rights of the Sámi people. She has taken part in protests against the establishment of an iron ore mine in Kallak. In 2014, she recorded the album Mountain Songs and other Stories along with the bluegrass band Downhill Bluegrass band.

Also in 2014, she took part in the SVT show Sápmi Sessions along with Aki and King Fari Band. In Sveriges Radio's radio theater Dagbok från Gallok she can be heard as an actress and also the producer of the music. Along with her sister Mimie Märak she toured with the concert Under Asfalten ett Fjäll. In 2015, she sang the World Cup song "Love Last Forever" along with music group Mando Diao for the 2015 skiing world cup.

She starred in the film Glada hälsningar från Missångerträsk by Martina Haag, and she has also toured with Giron sámi teáhter.

Märak presented an episode of Sveriges Radio's show Sommar i P1 on 30 July 2015.

In 2016, she played the role of Evelina Geatki, a poet and Sami activist in the Swedish-French series Midnattssol (a.k.a. Midnight Sun and Jour Polaire).

She featured on "Eanan", a song by Canadian EDM/hip-hop group A Tribe Called Red from their album We Are the Halluci Nation. In 2024, Märak participated in the SVT Christmas calendar Snödrömmar; she also created the show's music.

== Discography ==
=== Studio albums ===
- 2014: Mountain Songs and Other Stories (with Downhill Bluegrass Band)
- 2019: Utopi
- 2024: Anekdot

=== EPs ===
- 2016: 1
- 2017: 5
- 2019: Ärr
- 2021: Så mycket bättre 2021 – Tolkningarna
- 2022: Arvet

=== Singles ===
Title	Year	Peak chart positions	Album
Title	Year	SWE	Album
"Mountain Songs" (with Downhill Bluegrass Band)	2012	—	Non-album single
"Mitt största fan"	2015	—	Non-album single
"Feel That Gold"	2015	—	Non-album single
"Backa bak"	2016	—	Non-album single
"Rebell"	2016	—	Non-album single
"Andas"	2017	—	5
"Långsamt"	2017	—	Non-album single
"Baseball Bat"	2018	—	Non-album single
"Vill ni se en stjärna"	2018	—	Non-album single
"Järnrör"	2018	—	Non-album single
"Hatar"	2019	—	Ärr
"Lova ingenting"	2019	—	Utopi
"Letar lite ljus här"	2019	—	Utopi
"Jåhkåmåhkke"	2021	—	Non-album single
"Salvador"	2021	—	Non-album single
"Nu brinner ängarna"	2021	—	Non-album single
"NikeSunnas joik"	2021	—	Non-album single
"Eloise"	2021	60	Så mycket bättre
"Jag kommer hem igen till slut"	2021	—	Så mycket bättre
"Änglar"	2021	— (Note: "Änglar" did not enter the Swedish Singellista Chart, but peaked at number 11 on the Swedish Heatseeker Chart.)	Så mycket bättre
"Dimma" (featuring Melissa Horn)	2022	—	TBA
"Sirenerna" (featuring Yei Gonzalez)	2022		TBA
