= Moscow Noir =

Television series

- Swedish: Dirigenten
- Inspired by: The Conductor from Saint Petersburg by: Camilla Grebe; Paul Leander-Engström
- Directed by: Mikael Håfström; Johan Brisinger; Mårten Klingberg
- Countries of origin: Sweden; Russia
- Original languages: Swedish; English; Russian
- No. of episodes: 8

Production
- Production companies: Black Spark Film & TV

Original release
- Network: CMore
- Release: December 31, 2018

Moscow Noir (Swedish: Dirigenten) is a Swedish-Russian financial thriller television series. Set in Moscow in 1999, the series focuses on Tom Blixen (Adam Pålsson), a Swedish investment manager who is involved in a shady trade deal with a Russian oil company.

== Cast ==
- Adam Pålsson – Tom Blixen/Johan Berg
- Karolina Gruszka – Olga Ukolova
- Linda Zilliacus – Rebecka Ekholm
- Georg Nikoloff – Dmitri Skurov
- Christopher Wagelin – Fredrik Kastrup
- Brian McCardie – Lord Pendergast
- Juris Zagars – Strelka
- Gediminas Storpirstis – Kruglov

== Episodes ==
No.	Title	Directed by	Written by	Original release date
1	"Episode 1"	Mikael Håfström	Aleksi Bardy & Mikael Håfström & Piodor Gustafsson	December 31, 2018
2	"Episode 2"	Mikael Håfström	Aleksi Bardy & Mikael Håfström & Piodor Gustafsson	December 31, 2018
3	"Episode 3"	Mikael Håfström	Mikael Håfström & Piodor Gustafsson & Max Barron	December 31, 2018
4	"Episode 4"	Mikael Håfström	Mia Ylönen & Mikael Håfström & Max Barron	December 31, 2018
5	"Episode 5"	Johan Brisinger	Mia Ylönen & Piodor Gustafsson & Max Barron	December 31, 2018
6	"Episode 6"	Johan Brisinger	Mia Ylönen & Ben Harris & Piodor Gustafsson & Max Barron	December 31, 2018
7	"Episode 7"	Mårten Klingberg	Max Barron & Piodor Gustafsson	December 31, 2018
8	"Episode 8"	Mårten Klingberg	Max Barron & Piodor Gustafsson	December 31, 2018

== Production ==
The series is based on the novel The Conductor from Saint Petersburg by Camilla Grebe and Paul Leander-Engström, adapted by Aleksi Bardy, Mia Ylönen, Max Barron. It was produced by Black Spark Film & TV and the producer was Piodor Gustafsson. The series consisted of eight episodes, four of which were directed by Mikael Håfström.

== Release ==
The series was originally broadcast in Sweden on C More Entertainment and in Poland on Platforma Canal+. In the United Kingdom it was streamed on All4's Walter Presents, where it premiered on 13 September 2020. In Australia it was broadcast on SBS.
