= Sisters 1968 =

2018 Swedish television miniseries

- English-language promotional poster
- Swedish: Systrar 1968
- Created by: Martina Bigert; Maria Thulin
- Directed by: Kristina Humle
- Composers: Irya Gmeyner; Martin Hederos
- Country of origin: Sweden
- Original languages: Swedish; English

Production
- Producer: Emma Åkesdotter Ronge
- Cinematography: David Grehn

Original release
- Network: SVT1
- Release: 25 December 2018

Sisters 1968 (Swedish: Systrar 1968) is a three-part 2018 Swedish miniseries created and written by Martina Bigert and Maria Thulin. Directed by Kristina Humle, the series centres on Karin (Mikaela Knapp), a politically-inclined aspiring journalist from a working-class background, who takes a summer job with a local newspaper in Ystad. The miniseries premiered 25 December 2018 on SVT1.

== Cast ==
- Mikaela Knapp as Karin Ström: recent journalism school graduate from a working-class background
- Maja Rung as Lottie Åkerman: Karin's unconventional artist friend; has a daughter and a non-monogamous relationship with Mike
- Anna Åström as Ingela Melin: Georg and Ulla's daughter
- Hannes Fohlin as Janne Meyer: dropped out of medical school in favour of socialist organising; from a wealthy background
- Sunjatha Conta as Mike: African-American musician; has a daughter and a non-monogamous relationship with Lottie
- Jens Hultén as Georg Melin: newspaper and hotel owner in Ystad
- Livia Millhagen as Ulla Melin: Georg's wife
- Kim Sulocki as Gottfrid: manager of the hotel in Ystad, started the beauty pageant; runs a secret weekly brothel
- Henrik Norlén as Rune: editor of Ystad Tidning
- Lo Kauppi as Gertrud Ström: Karin's single mother with terminal stomach cancer; works as a cleaner
- Sven Boräng as Håkan: Ingela's fiancé

== Episodes ==
No.	Title	Directed by	Written by	Original release date
1	"Episode 1"	Kristina Humle	Martina Bigert and Maria Thulin	25 December 2018
Karin attempts to sell several articles to a newspaper editor, including anti-Vietnam War writing, but he declines to publish them. Her mother Gertrud, who is secretly suffering from stomach cancer and working as a cleaner, leaves a message with George Melin’s wife Ulla about a possible summer job for Karin at the newspaper he owns. Seeking freelance work, Karin attends a demonstration against Rhodesia, where she interviews protester Janne Meyer, who invites her to join the FNL. Facing financial difficulties, Georg and Ulla consider renting out a room, as their daughter Ingela is soon to be married. At an informal party and art exhibit, Lottie receives an offer for her art, while Karin and Janne meet again and have sex. To revive their struggling paper, Georg proposes hiring a young, radical journalist. Karin is soon offered a temporary job at Ystad Tidning, with accommodation at Georg’s house. She moves to Ystad, is assigned to cover a beauty pageant won by Ingela. She writes a critical article that is rejected by her editor. Karin also invites Lottie to live there and reports on a book club discussing The Feminine Mystique. Janne reunites with Karin in Ystad.
2	"Episode 2"	Kristina Humle	Martina Bigert and Maria Thulin	TBA
As Midsummer approaches, Karin interviews hotel maids and learns that Gottfrid is a groper. After Gottfrid lures Ingela to his office and tries to assault her, she confides in Karin and Lottie; they encourage her to make a political speech. During her crowning as Miss Ystad, the women stage a political protest with a banner where Lottie disrobes. Ingela’s parents scold her, but Ulla begins contemplating her own lack of independence. Rune is thrilled when Karin’s headline about the event makes the front page in Stockholm, and she discovers the hotel functions as a secret gentleman’s club. Mike shows up unexpectedly with his and Lottie’s daughter, Lily. Lottie has a sexual encounter with Mike, Janne, and Ingela. Karin is upset, leading Lottie to dismiss her as too conventional and reveal she previously had sex with Janne before the men leave for Paris. Ulla starts to suspect Georg may be interested in Karin. Amidst fears she may be pregnant, Karin prepares to interview Georg about Gottfrid’s parties. However, before she can confront him, Georg informs her that her mother, Gertrud, has died. Lottie drives a grieving Karin back to Stockholm.
3	"Episode 3"	Kristina Humle	Martina Bigert and Maria Thulin	TBA
Karin is devastated to learn that her mother knew she was going to die but did not want to disturb her work. Gertrud left her a letter revealing her father is Georg. Although grieving, Karin focuses on her article about Gottfrid's parties. Rune tells him about the story; Georg unsuccessfully tries to convince Karin to drop it. Karin infiltrates Gottfrid’s party. Ulla is overwhelmed by hosting duties. Håkan rebuffs Ingela after she initiates sex. Ingela connects Karin with an abortionist, but it is expensive. Lottie, who also read the letter, thinks Georg should pay. Karin steals a painting to cover the cost. Håkan learns Ingela is no longer a virgin and breaks off their engagement. Karin recovers from her abortion and informs Georg about the weekly illegal brothel at his hotel, as well as Gottfrid’s nude photos of young women, including Ingela. In part to protect his reputation, Georg plans fairer working conditions for the maids. Georg and Karin share a heartfelt conversation before she leaves for a permanent journalism job in Stockholm. Ingela visits Karin; she knows they are sisters and plans to study sociology. Karin reunites with Janne. In the final scene, Ulla attends a feminist meeting.

== Production ==
Sisters 1968 was written by Martina Bigert and Maria Thulin. It was produced by Emma Åkesdotter Ronge. Filming was completed in the summer of 2018 in the city of Ystad and a farm outside Sjöbo. The Gamla rådhuset, Ystad stood in for a grand hotel featured in the series.

== Reception ==
The miniseries received an average rating of 3.4 out of 5 on the Swedish review aggregator website Kritiker, based on reviews from 10 critics. It won fictional programme of the year at the Riagalan. The composers were also recognised; Irya Gmeyner and Martin Hederos won best music for a fictional programme.
