= Sally and Freedom =

1981 film

- Directed by: Gunnel Lindblom
- Written by: Margareta Garpe
- Produced by: Ingmar Bergman
- Starring: Ewa Fröling
- Cinematography: Tony Forsberg
- Release date: 28 February 1981
- Running time: 102 minutes
- Country: Sweden
- Language: Swedish

Sally and Freedom (Swedish: Sally och friheten) is a 1981 Swedish drama film directed by Gunnel Lindblom. Gunn Wållgren won the award for Best Actress at the 17th Guldbagge Awards.

== Cast ==
- Ewa Fröling as Sally
- Hans Wigren as Simon
- Leif Ahrle as Jonas
- Gunn Wållgren as Sally's Mother
- Oscar Ljung as Sally's Father
- Svea Holst as Sally's Grandma
- Gunnel Lindblom as Nora
- Kim Anderzon as Inger
