= Veni Vidi Vici (TV series) =

2017 Swedish comedy web television series

- Created by: Rafael Edholm
- Starring: Thomas Bo Larsen; Livia Millhagen

Original release
- Network: Viaplay
- Release: 17 April 2017

Veni Vidi Vici is a Swedish comedy web television series created by Rafael Edholm. The plot follows a Danish film director (Thomas Bo Larsen) in decline. His films get bad reviews, and at home he is financially supported by his wife (Livia Millhagen). He is forced to get a real job. It premiered on April 13, 2017, via Swedish online streaming service Viaplay, as its third original production.

The series received a generally positive review from Karolina Fjellborg in Aftonbladet.

Hulu acquired the streaming rights to the series in October 2017.
