= Maja Rung =

Swedish actress (born 1987)

Maja Matilda Johanna Rung (born 24 April 1987) is a Swedish actress and musical artist. She played the role of Liv Hellström in the SVT series Andra Avenyn, as well as Bonus Family, Sisters 1968, and Modus. She has also had leading roles in two of SVT’s Christmas Calendars ”Mirakel” in 2020 and ”Tidstjuven” in 2025. In theater and musicals she has had roles in ”Cabaret”, ”Kulla-Gulla” and ”Grease”.
