= Details (film) =

2003 Swedish drama film

- Swedish cover
- Directed by: Kristian Petri
- Written by: Jonas Frykberg; Lars Norén (play)
- Produced by: Christer Nilson; Nik Hedman; Lars Kolvig; Enrico Molé
- Starring: Rebecka Hemse; Michael Nyqvist; Jonas Karlsson
- Cinematography: Göran Hallberg
- Edited by: Johan Söderberg
- Music by: David Österberg; Johan Söderberg
- Release date: 10 October 2003
- Running time: 114 minutes
- Countries: Sweden; Denmark
- Language: Swedish

Details (Swedish: Detaljer) is a 2003 Swedish drama film directed by Kristian Petri about a young author and her various relationships over ten years. It was entered into the 26th Moscow International Film Festival.

== Synopsis ==
The film is set in Stockholm during the 1990s. Erik, a book publisher, is married to Ann, a doctor. A manuscript from a young writer named Emma arrives at the publishing house, and Erik falls in love with her. However, she begins a relationship with Stefan, a young playwright who also happens to be Ann's patient. The film follows these four characters over the course of ten years, exploring how their relationships evolve and intertwine.

== Cast ==
Rebecka Hemse .... Emma
Michael Nyqvist .... Erik
Jonas Karlsson .... Stefan
Pernilla August .... Ann
Gunnel Fred .... Eva
Valter Skarsgård .... Daniel (young)
Gustaf Skarsgård .... Daniel (old)
Ingela Olsson .... Actress
Leif Andrée .... Actor
Ebba Hultkvist .... Rineke
