= Cockpit (2012 film) =

- Film poster
- Directed by: Mårten Klingberg
- Written by: Erik Ahrnbom
- Produced by: Rebecka Lafrenz (producer); Mimmi Spång (producer)
- Cinematography: Simon Pramsten
- Edited by: Lars Gustafson
- Music by: Mathias Nille Nilsson
- Release date: 13 July 2012
- Country: Sweden
- Language: Swedish

Cockpit is a 2012 Swedish film directed by Mårten Klingberg.

== Plot ==
After getting fired from his job as a pilot and dumped by his wife, Valle seeks to find a new job. Out of desperation on the job market he disguises himself as a woman in order to get a job from Silver, a company seeking a female pilot. The lines between his female and male life, as well as his personal and love life, starts to become a blur.

Valle gets drawn deeper into the conspiracy when he accidentally becomes a national hero after a successful emergency landing. "She" is dubbed "an angel in the cockpit". Media celebrate "her" image as a role model for girls and a living proof that women handle mentally demanding jobs just as well as men.

The bubble is popped when Valle's co-pilot comes forward, claiming that "the angel in the cockpit" panicked so bad that "she" had to be knocked unconscious in order for the plane to be landed safely. Black box recording confirms this version.

The incident quickly becomes the topic of a heated debate concerning women's rights, abilities, and affirmation policies.

Feeling that he owes it to the women he's inadvertently endangered, Valle, still dressed as a woman, reveals his real identity in order to make the public understand that his failure was not a gender issue, but simply the fault of a human being.

== Cast ==
- Jonas Karlsson as Valle
- Björn Gustafsson as Albin
- Björn Andersson as Harald
- Mårten Klingberg as Jens
- Chatarina Larsson as Susanna
- Sofia Ledarp as Annika
- Gustav Levin as Peter
- Karin Lithman as Caroline
- Tanja Lorentzon
- Ellen Mattsson as Maria
- Marie Robertson as Cecilia
- Måns Westfelt as Gunnar
- Carina Söderman as Rakel
- Sonny Johnson as Pacient
