= Miffo =

2003 Swedish film

- Promotional poster
- Directed by: Daniel Lind Lagerlöf
- Screenplay by: Malin Lagerlöf
- Produced by: Daniel Lind Lagerlöf; Susanne Lundqvist; Joakim Hansson
- Starring: Jonas Karlsson; Livia Millhagen; Ingvar Hirdwall; Liv Mjönes
- Cinematography: Olof Johnson
- Distributed by: Sonet Film AB
- Release date: 1 August 2003 (Sweden)
- Running time: 97 minutes
- Country: Sweden
- Language: Swedish

Miffo is a 2003 Swedish film directed by Daniel Lind Lagerlöf.

== Cast ==
- Jonas Karlsson as Tobias Carling
- Livia Millhagen as Carola Christiansson
- Ingvar Hirdwall as Karl Henrik
- Liv Mjönes as Jenny Brunander
- Kajsa Ernst as Sonja
- Isa Aouifia as Leo
- Fyr Thorwald as Håkan "Håkke" Bodin
- Carina Boberg as Karin
- Gustav Levin as Erik
- Malin Crépin as Anna
- Robin Keller as Jonny
- Jan-Erik Emretsson as Gunnar
- Joel Östlund as Ruben
- Stig Asp as Leif

== Reception ==
The film received a generally negative review from Eva af Geijerstam in Dagens Nyheter, although she praised Livia Millhagen's performance. Millhagen was nominated for a Guldbagge Best Actress Award for her portrayal of Carola.
