= Woman of Darkness =

1966 film

- Directed by: Arne Mattsson
- Written by: Yngve Lyttkens (book); Eva Dahlbeck
- Produced by: Lorens Marmstedt
- Starring: Gunnel Lindblom; Christina Schollin; Gösta Ekman
- Cinematography: Lasse Björne
- Edited by: Carl-Olov Skeppstedt
- Music by: Georg Riedel
- Production company: Svensk Filmindustri
- Distributed by: Svensk Filmindustri
- Release date: 1 October 1966
- Running time: 113 minutes
- Country: Sweden
- Language: Swedish

Woman of Darkness or The Yngsjö Murder (Swedish: Yngsjömordet) is a 1966 Swedish historical crime film directed by Arne Mattsson and starring Gunnel Lindblom, Christina Schollin and Gösta Ekman. It was shot at the Råsunda Studios in Stockholm. The film's sets were designed by the art director P.A. Lundgren. It was based on the real Yngsjö murder case of 1889. It was a critical success and drew significant audiences.

== Cast ==
- Gunnel Lindblom as Anna / Mother
- Christina Schollin as Hanna / Per's wife
- Gösta Ekman as Per / Son-Hanna's husband
- Heinz Hopf as Helmertz / Judge
- Elsa Prawitz as Hilda Persdotter
- Rune Lindström as Wahlbom
- Isa Quensel as Grave-Karna
- Tore Lindwall as Johan Olsson
- Lasse Krantz as Erik Olsson
- Gösta Bernhard as Jöns Persson
- Stefan Ekman as Vicar Hasselqvist
- Frej Lindqvist as H.N. Hansson
- Curt Ericson as Dalman
- Arne Strand as Persson / fångvaktare-jailer
- Gudrun Östbye as Johanna Hansson
- Christian Bratt as Schneider - fängelsedirektör
- Julie Bernby as Hannas mor
- Maritta Marke as Stina Edvards
- Axel Düberg as Johanna Hanssons man
- Cleo Boman as Bengta Jönsdotter
- Birger Lensander as Ola Svensson
- Monique Ernstdotter as Anna Jönsson

== Bibliography ==
- Björklund, Elisabet & Larsson, Mariah. Swedish Cinema and the Sexual Revolution: Critical Essays. McFarland, 2016.
- Qvist, Per Olov & von Bagh, Peter. Guide to the Cinema of Sweden and Finland. Greenwood Publishing Group, 2000.
