= Corner Office (film) =

2022 American film by Joachim Back

- Theatrical release poster
- Directed by: Joachim Back
- Screenplay by: Ted Kupper
- Based on: The Room by Jonas Karlsson
- Produced by: Luke Rivett; Dylan Collingwood; Robert Mitchell; Matt Clarke; David Milchard; Oliver Ridge; Andrew Harvey
- Starring: Jon Hamm; Danny Pudi; Sarah Gadon; Christopher Heyerdahl
- Cinematography: Paweł Edelman
- Edited by: James Norris
- Music by: Frans Bak; Keld Haaning Ibsen
- Production companies: Grindstone Entertainment Group; Tilt9 Entertainment; Godlenlight Films; Anonymous Content
- Distributed by: Lionsgate
- Release dates: June 9, 2022 (Tribeca); August 4, 2023 (United States)
- Running time: 102 minutes
- Country: United States
- Language: English

Corner Office is a 2022 American mystery-comedy drama film directed by Joachim Back and written by Ted Kupper, based on the novel The Room by Jonas Karlsson. The film stars Jon Hamm, Danny Pudi, Sarah Gadon and Christopher Heyerdahl.

The film premiered at the Tribeca Film Festival on June 9, 2022 and was released in theaters on August 4, 2023.

== Cast ==
- Jon Hamm as Orson
- Danny Pudi as Rakesh
- Sarah Gadon as Alyssa
- Christopher Heyerdahl as Andrew
- Allison Riley as Carol
- Bill Marchant as Mitchell
- Kimberley Shoniker as Shannon
- Shawn MacDonald as Bradley
- Veena Sood as the psychiatrist

== Plot ==
Orson, a rigid and socially awkward office worker, begins a new job at the Authority. He considers his coworkers distracting and inefficient, and follows a strict routine intended to maximize his productivity.

Orson discovers a comfortably furnished room near the elevators and restroom and finds that he can work exceptionally well there. When his coworker Rakesh asks why he spends time standing motionless before a blank wall, Orson realizes that no one else can see the room. After Orson unsuccessfully tries to show it to his coworkers, his supervisor, Andrew, orders him to stop using it and sends him to a psychiatrist. The psychiatrist finds him capable of continuing to work, and Orson agrees to avoid the room.

Unable to concentrate as effectively elsewhere, Orson eventually begins returning to it after his coworkers leave. He secretly completes difficult case files and leaves them for Andrew. After Carol discovers that Orson is responsible, his work impresses senior management, and he is assigned increasingly important cases and moved into quality assurance.

At a company party, the receptionist Alyssa asks Orson to show her the room. She says she cannot see it but plays along as he guides her through the doorway. Orson experiences their conversation as occurring inside the room and believes they have formed a special connection, but Alyssa subsequently avoids him.

Growing confident in his importance to the company, Orson asks Andrew for unrestricted use of the room as his workplace. Andrew consults the executive vice president, who examines the building's floor plans and concludes that no space exists between the elevators and restrooms. When Orson continues to insist that the room is real, Andrew fires him.

Orson angrily denounces the company and his coworkers before leaving. He then suddenly runs back into the building as employees pursue him. From their perspective he again stands before the blank wall; from Orson's perspective, he enters the room, where he finally finds peace and quiet.

== Production ==
In February 2021, it was announced Jon Hamm, Danny Pudi, Sarah Gadon, and Christopher Heyerdahl joined the cast of the film, with Joachim Back directing from a screenplay by Ted Kupper.

Principal photography began in February 2021 in Vancouver, British Columbia.

== Release ==
The film premiered at the Tribeca Film Festival on June 9, 2022. It was released in theaters and on demand on August 4, 2023.

== Reception ==
On the review aggregator website Rotten Tomatoes, 22% of 18 critics' reviews are positive, with an average rating of 5.4/10. Metacritic, which uses a weighted average, assigned the film a score of 47 out of 100, based on seven critics, indicating "mixed or average" reviews.
