= Frej Lindqvist =

Swedish actor (born 1937)

- Born: Frej Gunnar Volter Lindqvist; 13 October 1937 (age 88); Helsinki, Finland
- Occupation: Actor
- Years active: 1961–2017
- Spouse: Christina
- Children: 2
- Awards: Thalia Prize (1982)

Frej Lindqvist (born 13 October 1937) is a Swedish actor. He has appeared in more than 50 films and television shows since 1961.

== Early life ==
Frej Gunnar Volter Lindqvist, who is a Swedish-speaking Finn, was born in Helsinki, Finland on 13 October 1937. During World War II, he was sent to Luleå, Sweden, as a Finnish war child. Lindqvist studied philosophy and literary history at Lund University before moving back to Helsinki where he studied at Svenska Teaterns elevskola from 1958 to 1960. He moved back to Sweden in 1964.

In 1982, he was awarded the Thalia Prize by Svenska Dagbladet.

== Personal life ==
Lindqvist and his wife Christina have two children.

== Selected filmography ==
- Woman of Darkness (1966)
- A Handful of Love (1974)
- I Am Maria (1979)
- Den lilla björnen Paddington - kassettband (Berättarröst) (1979)
