= Daniel Lind Lagerlöf =

Swedish film director, screenwriter and producer

- Born: Daniel Magnus Gösta Lind; 6 February 1969; Stockholm, Sweden
- Disappeared: 6 October 2011 (aged 42) near Tanumshede, Sweden
- Status: Missing for 14 years, 9 months and 16 days, presumed dead
- Occupations: Film director, screenwriter, producer
- Years active: 1990–2011
- Spouse: Malin Lagerlöf
- Children: 3

Daniel Lind Lagerlöf (6 February 1969 – missing since 6 October 2011) was a Swedish director, screenwriter and producer.

== Career ==
Lagerlöf began his work in television as an assistant, and directed his first film, Föreställningen (The Performance) in 1990. In 1997, he began working on Skärgårdsdoktorn, a highly successful drama series in Sweden and Norway. After it ended in 2000, Lagerlöf worked on several Beck-films, before returning to television. His last completed project was the three-part mini-series Bibliotekstjuven (the Library Thief), written by his wife Malin Lagerlöf.

In 2008, he made his stage directing debut with Hjalmar Söderberg's The Serious Game at Stockholm City Theater. The production starred Livia Millhagen as Lydia Stille and Gustaf Skarsgård as Arvid Stjärnblom. Dagens Nyheter critic Jenny Aschenbrenner gave the play a positive review, praising the acting, direction, and staging.

== Personal life ==
Lagerlöf married his long-time girlfriend Malin Lagerlöf in 1997. They had three children together.

== Disappearance ==
On 6 October 2011, Lagerlöf disappeared during preparations for the filming of Camilla Läckberg's Fjällbackamorden - Strandriddaren while scouting a planned filming location in the Tjurpannan nature reserve, with two crew members. The trio had split up but Lagerlöf did not meet up with the group again as planned. Lagerlöf left behind a wife and three children.

It is believed Lagerlöf was caught on slippery rocks by large waves sweeping the area and pulled out to sea near the steep cliffs outside Tanumshede in Bohuslän. There were no witnesses to what actually happened. As of 2024, no remains have been found, and Lagerlöf is presumed deceased.

== Selected filmography ==
- 1999 – Breaking out (Vägen ut)
- 2001 – Making Babies (Hans och hennes)
- 2002 – Beck – Annonsmannen
- 2002 – Beck – Pojken i glaskulan
- 2003 – Miffo
- 2005 - Road to Italy (Buss till Italien)
- 2005 - Medicinmannen
- 2006 - Svalan, katten, rosen, döden
- 2007 - The Pyramid
- 2009 - The Man Under the Stairs (TV-series)
- 2009 - Johan Falk: Operation Nightingale
- 2011 - Bibliotekstjuven

== See also ==
- List of people who disappeared mysteriously: post-1970
