= Gunn Wållgren =

Swedish actress (1913–1983)

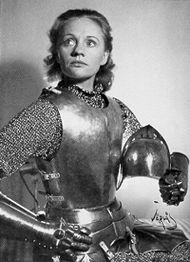
- As Joan of Arc, Royal Dramatic Theatre, 1948.
- Born: Gunnel Margaret Haraldsdotter Wållgren; 16 November 1913; Gothenburg, Sweden
- Died: 4 June 1983 (aged 69); Stockholm, Sweden
- Occupation: Actress
- Years active: 1934–1982
- Spouses: Hampe Faustman (m. 1941; div. 1949) Per-Axel Branner (m. 1954; died 1975)
- Children: 2

Gunn Wållgren (born Gunnel Margaret Haraldsdotter Wållgren; [vɔlɡreːn]; (16 November 1913 – 4 June 1983) was a Swedish stage and film actress. She is best remembered for her role in Ingmar Bergman's film Fanny and Alexander.

== Personal life ==
Gunn Wållgren was born in Gothenburg on 16 November 1913. In her teenage years, she began performing with a local children's theater group. Her father did not support her aspirations, and in an attempt to distract her, he sent her overseas on a trip to Switzerland. Gunn persisted in her ambition to pursue a career in acting. She secretly applied for the Royal Dramatic Theatre's acting school in Stockholm in 1934 and was admitted. One of her teachers was Hilda Borgström, the famous Swedish film and stage actor.

In 1941, Wållgren married Hampe Faustman (born Erik Stellan Chatham), an actor and film director and they had two daughters, Susanne and Elaine. They divorced in 1948. She later married Per-Axel Branner, a stage director, in 1954 and they were together until his death in 1975.

== Career ==
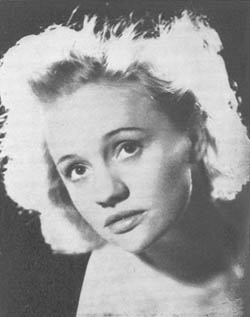
Gunn Wållgren, 1940s

=== Theater ===
Wållgren was awarded her first major role in 1936, at the Royal Dramatic Theatre portraying Mildred in Eugene O'Neill's Ah, Wilderness!, which was a long-running production. Wållgren received an immediate contract with the Royal Dramatic Theatre after her graduation from drama school in 1937. Despite working at different theatres throughout her life, Wållgren always returned to the Swedish national stage. Stage performances by Wållgren include her portrayal of Sorel Bliss in Noël Coward's Hay Fever in 1937, Celia in Shakespeare's As You Like It 1938 (directed by Alf Sjöberg), Curley's wife in the original Swedish staging of John Steinbeck's Of Mice and Men in 1940, Iphigenia in Goethe's Iphigenia in Tauris 1941, Ophelia in the classic 1942 staging of Hamlet (opposite Lars Hanson in the title role), Mary Grey/Joan of Arc in Joan of Lorraine by Maxwell Anderson in 1948, Catherine Sloper in The Heiress by Ruth and Augustus Goetz in the 1950/51 season, Indra's daughter in the Olof Molander-staging of Strindberg's A Dream Play 1955, Nina in Chekhov's The Seagull 1955, Masha in Chekhov's Three Sisters 1958, Isabella in Shakespeare's Measure for Measure 1958, Nora in Ibsen's A Doll's House 1962, Gerda in Strindberg's Storm 1964, Mrs. Alving in Ibsen's Ghosts, the grand portrayal of Madame Liubov Andreievna Ranevskaya in The Cherry Orchard by Chekhov in 1967, Martha Brewster in Arsenic and Old Lace in 1970, the title role of Agnes in Kent Andersson's 1972 play, Lena in Fugard's Boesman and Lena 1977 and Ethel Thayer in Sista Sommaren (play based on the film On Golden Pond, starring Katharine Hepburn in the same role) in 1981.

=== Film ===
Wållgren's film debut was in Sonja in 1943, but her breakthrough came with Kvinnor i fångenskap the same year, where Wållgren portrayed a young prisoner on the run. She had roles in films such as Flickan och djävulen (opposite Stig Järrel) 1944, Var sin väg 1946, Medan porten var stängd 1946 (written & directed by Hasse Ekman), Kvinna utan ansikte 1947 (with an early script by Ingmar Bergman), Glasberget 1953 (directed by Hasse Ekman) and Klänningen1964 (directed by Olof Molander with a script by Vilgot Sjöman), among others.

Her supporting role in Gunnel Lindblom's debating drama Sally och friheten (1981) (Sally and Freedom) about a woman dealing with painful memories and the reality of an abortion earned her the Guldbagge Award (the Golden Beetle) for Best Actress.

Wållgren received critical acclaim for her portrayal of the grandmother in Ingmar Bergman's film Fanny och Alexander (1982), which was the last role of her life.

== Death and legacy ==
Shortly after filming Fanny and Alexander, Wållgren was diagnosed with terminal cancer. Her condition deteriorated quickly and she died on 4 June 1983.

The The Gunn Wållgren Memorial Fund was established in 1984, and the Gunn Wållgren Awards (Swedish: Gunn Wållgren-stipendiet) were established in her honour. An actor and an opera singer each receive a scholarship award each year on Wållgren's birthday in November.

== Filmography ==
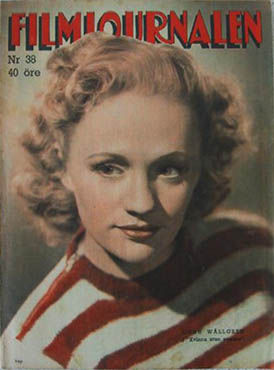
On the cover of Filmjournalen, 1947

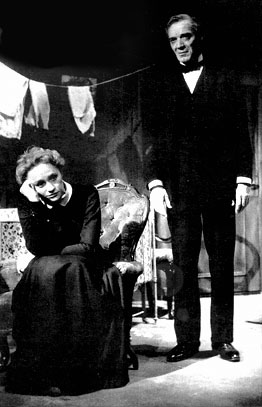
On stage: as Indra's daughter in A Dream Play by August Strindberg, The Royal Dramatic Theatre, 1955

- Imprisoned Women (1943) as Viola
- The Sixth Shot (1943) as Lulu
- Sonja (1943) as Sonja's Room-mate
- Ordet (1943) as Kristina
- The Girl and the Devil (1944) as Karin
- The Emperor of Portugallia (1944) as Klara Fina Gulleborg
- Crime and Punishment (1945) as Sonja
- The Journey Away (1945) as Ellen Andersson
- Desire (1946) as Ingrid
- While the Door Was Locked (1946) as Marianne Sahlen
- Harald the Stalwart (1946) as Peasant woman
- Woman Without A Face (1947) as Rut Köhler
- Each to His Own Way (1948) as Birgit Sundell
- The Nuthouse (1951) as Maggan
- The Glass Mountain (1953) as Otti Moreus
- The Dress (1964) as Helen Fürst
- Asmodeus (1966, TV film) as Madame de Berthas
- Kvinnas man (1966, TV film) as Lotta Friman
- Tartuffe (1966, TV Movie) as Elmire
- Fadren (aka Strindberg's The Father) (1967, TV film) as Laura
- Gengångare (aka Ibsen's Ghosts) (1967, TV Movie) as Candida
- Miss and Mrs Sweden (1969) as Rose Persson-Silvergrå
- Frida och hennes vän (1970, TV Mini-Series) as Fridas mor
- Söderkåkar (1970, TV Mini-Series) ) as Hanna Johnsson
- The Man Who Quit Smoking (1972) as Aunt Gunhild
- Kvartetten som sprängdes (1973, TV series) as Mrs. Åvik
- Rulle på Rulseröd (1974, TV Series) as Farmor
- Agnes (1974, TV film) as Agnes
- Förvandlingen (1976) as Gregor's Mother
- Leva livet (1976, TV film) as Mrs. Blom
- The Brothers Lionheart (1977) as Sofia
- Strandvaskeren (1978, TV Series) as Grandmother
- Svartskallen (1981, TV film) as Inez Bergman
- Sally and Freedom (1981) as Sally's Mother
- Fanny and Alexander (1982) as Helena Ekdahl - Ekdahlska huse

== Awards ==
- The Eugene O'Neill Award (1959)
- The Swedish Theatre Critics' Award (1962)
- The Guldbagge Award for Best Actress (1981)

== See also ==
- The Gunn Wållgren Award
