= Irene Lindh =

Swedish actress and singer (born 1945)

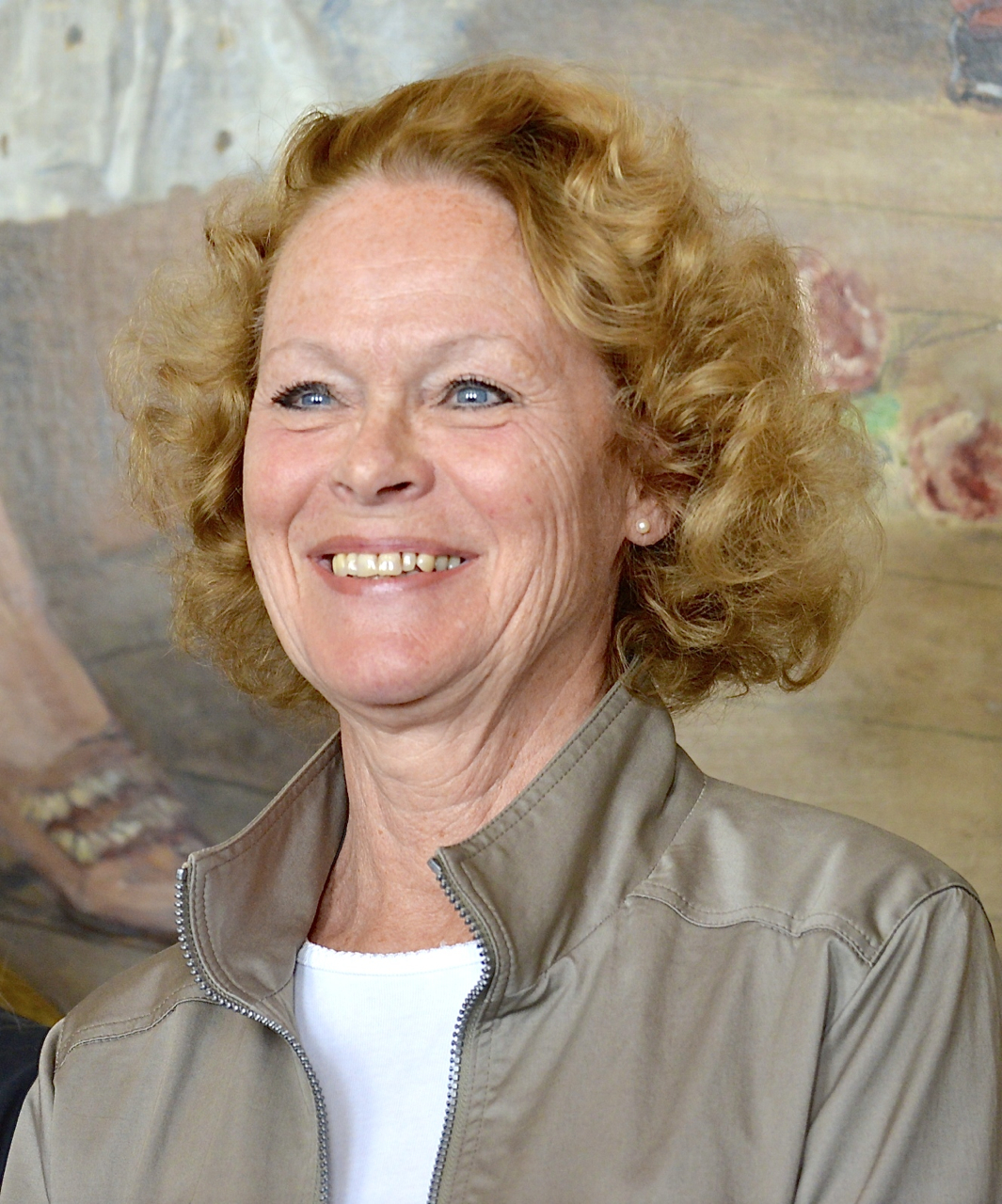
- Lindh in 2014.
- Born: Lena Irene Lindh; 13 October 1945 (age 80); Stockholm, Sweden
- Occupations: Actress, voice actress, singer
- Years active: 1967–present
- Spouse: Bernt Sisth
- Children: Maria Lindh (1969–2011)

Lena Irene Lindh (born 13 October 1945) is a Swedish stage and film actress and singer.

Lindh was born in Stockholm. She got her start in acting at eleven years of age at Vår teater, a children's theatre in Stockholm. Lindh studied at the Royal Dramatic Training Academy from 1964 to 1967. She is best known to international audiences for her role as Jenny Hultin in Arne Dahl: Misterioso, a Swedish television crime series.

Since her acting school days, Lindh has worked at the Royal Dramatic Theatre in Stockholm; her first performance was as an extra in Troilus and Cressida in 1967. She has played a range of roles at the Dramatic Theatre, including Albine in Britannicus in 1976, Œnone in Phèdre in 2006, Mistress Page in The Merry Wives of Windsor in 2009, and the Duchess of York in Richard III in 2014.

Lindh has also worked as a voice actor, and provided the voice of Petunia Dursley when the Harry Potter films were dubbed into Swedish. She is the Swedish voice of Zira in The Lion King 2: Simba's Pride. She is also a singer, and has released a record with Carl Jonas Love Almqvist's Songes.

== Awards ==
- 2004 The Eugene O'Neill Award
- 2005 Litteris et Artibus
