= Adam Pålsson =

Swedish actor and musician (born 1988)

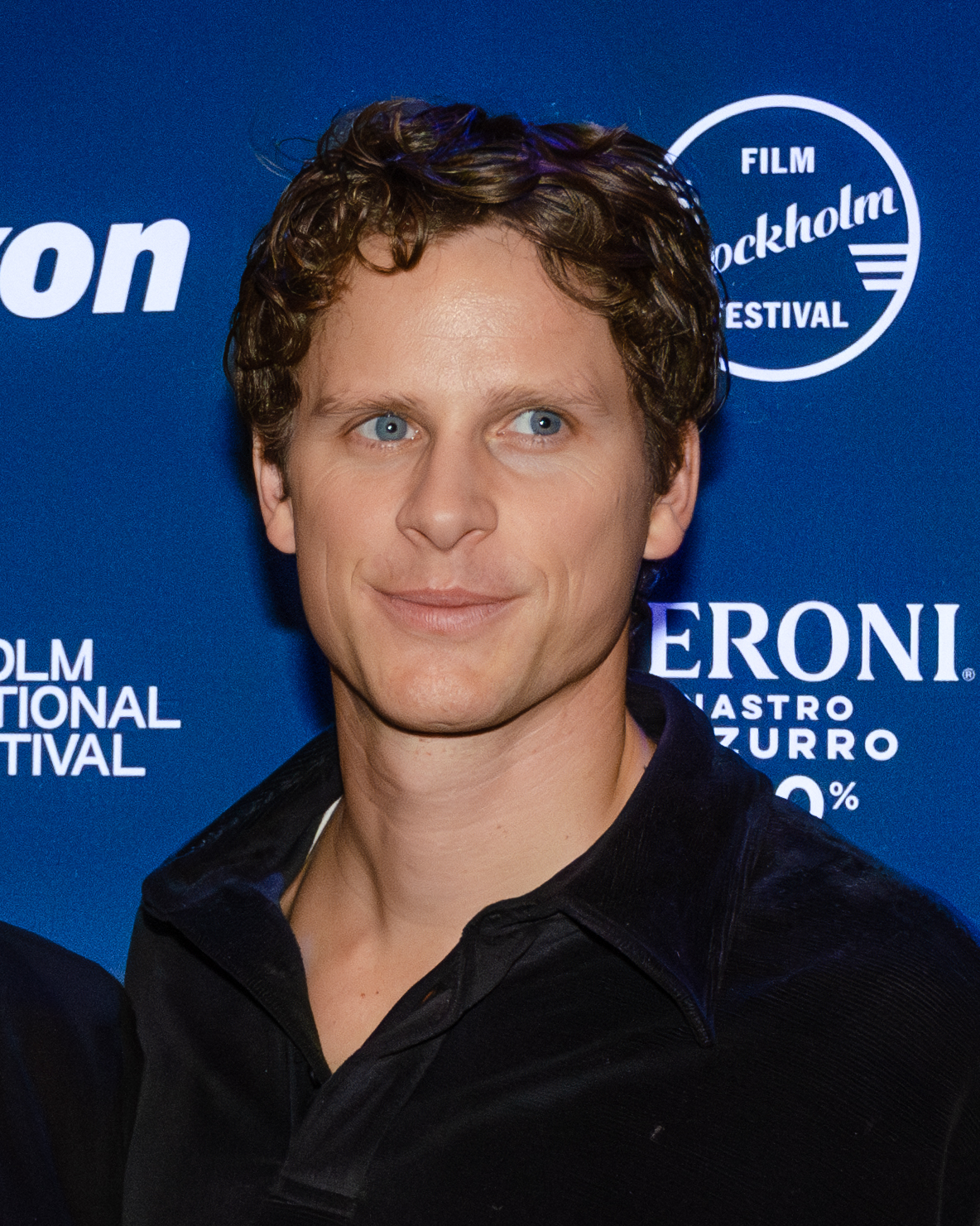
- Pålsson in 2023
- Born: Adam Gustav Justus Pålsson; 1988 (age 37–38); Haninge, Sweden
- Occupations: Actor, musician
- Partner: Celie Sparre
- Children: 2

Adam Gustav Justus Pålsson (born 1988) is a Swedish actor and musician. He has worked at the Royal Dramatic Theatre in Stockholm and is known for his leading television roles as Christian in SVT's Before We Die (2017-2019), Tom Blixen in C More's Moscow Noir (2018) and Kurt Wallander in Netflix's Young Wallander (2020-2022).

== Biography ==
Adam Gustav Justus Pålsson was born in 1988 in Haninge. In 2005, he appeared in Road to Italy.

Pålsson was educated at the Swedish National Academy of Mime and Acting in Stockholm between 2008 and 2011. In 2012, he had his own play Frida är gravid! performed at Teater Galeasen. He has also written and performed his own version of Hamlet, inspired by William Shakespeare and Heiner Müller at Stockholm's Stadsteater in 2010.

Pålsson is perhaps best known for his role in Jonas Gardell's series Don't Ever Wipe Tears Without Gloves which was broadcast on SVT, and for playing the lead role in Ted: För kärlekens skull, a 2018 biopic about the Swedish singer/songwriter Ted Gärdestad. He also played a major role, as Emil, in the third series of The Bridge.

Pålsson used to be the lead singer in an indie rock group, ÅR&DAR.

He played Mads in Armando Iannucci’s space sitcom Avenue 5 who was a gormless but good-looking crew-member. Initially he was supposed to be an extra, but was given a part and a name. Pålsson went for the role as he admires Iannucci so much.

He plays Kurt Wallander in the 2020 Netflix/Yellow Bird production Young Wallander. In an interview in The Guardian he explained he was able to connect with the character of Wallander as his family are from the same area of Sweden. He is also the only Swedish actor in the series. He had a main role in the Swedish crime drama series Before We Die.
