= The Glass Mountain (1953 film) =

1953 film

- Directed by: Gustaf Molander
- Written by: Sigfrid Siwertz (novel); Hasse Ekman; Gustaf Molander
- Produced by: Allan Ekelund
- Starring: Hasse Ekman; Eva Henning; Gunn Wållgren
- Cinematography: Åke Dahlqvist
- Edited by: Oscar Rosander
- Music by: Erik Nordgren
- Production company: Svensk Filmindustri
- Distributed by: Svensk Filmindustri
- Release date: 26 December 1953
- Running time: 101 minutes
- Country: Sweden
- Language: Swedish

The Glass Mountain (Swedish: Glasberget) is a 1953 Swedish drama film directed by Gustaf Molander and starring Hasse Ekman, Eva Henning and Gunn Wållgren. It was shot at the Råsunda Studios in Stockholm. The film's sets were designed by the art director P.A. Lundgren.

== Cast ==
- Hasse Ekman as Stellan Sylvester
- Eva Henning as Marta von Born
- Gunn Wållgren as Otti Moreus
- Margit Carlqvist as Iris
- Isa Quensel as Luiza Cabral
- Gunnar Björnstrand as Dr. Dalander
- Aurore Palmgren as Cemetery Worker
- Hugo Björne as Johannes
- Astrid Bodin as Telegraphist
- Helga Brofeldt as Marta's landlady
- Sven-Axel Carlsson as Messenger
- John Ivar Deckner as Professional dancer
- Elsa Ebbesen as Ida, nurse
- Paul Lakovary as Foreign glass customer
- Sten Lindén as Driver
- Lennart Lundh as Foreign department clerk
- Ulla Nyrén as Professional dancer
- Prico Paschetto as Foreign glass customer
- Gunvor Pontén as Miss Berg, Sylvester's secretary
- Hanny Schedin as Kristin, Sylvester's housemaid
- Greta Stave as Nurse
- Carl-Gunnar Wingård as Lodger

== Bibliography ==
- Qvist, Per Olov & Von Bagh, Peter . Guide to the Cinema of Sweden and Finland. Greenwood Publishing Group, 2000.
- Wallengren, Ann-Kristin. Welcome Home Mr Swanson: Swedish Emigrants and Swedishness on Film. Nordic Academic Press, 2014.
