= Only a Mother =

1949 film

- Directed by: Alf Sjöberg
- Written by: Alf Sjöberg
- Based on: Rya-Rya by Ivar Lo-Johansson
- Produced by: Carl-Anders Dymling
- Starring: Eva Dahlbeck; Ragnar Falck; Ulf Palme
- Cinematography: Martin Bodin
- Edited by: Oscar Rosander
- Music by: Dag Wirén
- Production company: Svensk Filmindustri
- Distributed by: Svensk Filmindustri
- Release date: 31 October 1949
- Running time: 92 minutes
- Country: Sweden
- Language: Swedish

Only a Mother (Swedish: Bara en mor) is a 1949 Swedish drama film written and directed by Alf Sjöberg and starring Eva Dahlbeck, Ragnar Falck and Ulf Palme. It featured the acting debut of Max Von Sydow.

The film's sets were designed by the art director Nils Svenwall.

== Main cast ==
- Eva Dahlbeck as Maria, aka Rya-Rya
- Ragnar Falck as Henrik, Rya-Rya's husband
- Ulf Palme as Hammar
- Hugo Björne as Eniel
- Åke Fridell as Inspector
- Mona Geijer-Falkner as Emili
- Max von Sydow as Nils
- Margaretha Krook as Berta
- Mimi Pollak as Erika Rost
- Elsa Widborg as Cowman's wife
- Olof Widgren as Rya-Rya's Father
- Ulla Smidje as Cecilia, the sick girl
- Sif Ruud as Teacher
- Signe Rydberg-Eklöf as Rya-Rya's Mother
- Ernst Brunman as School council's chairman
- Nils Hultgren as Alm, Cecilia's father

== Bibliography ==
- Gunnar Iverson, Astrid Soderbergh Widding & Tytti Soila. Nordic National Cinemas. Routledge, 2005.
