= Young Wallander =

Anglo-Swedish police procedural TV series

- Promotional poster
- Created by: Crime Drama; Thriller
- Based on: Kurt Wallander series by Henning Mankell
- Developed by: Ben Harris
- Starring: Adam Pålsson
- Composer: Matti Bye
- Countries of origin: Sweden; United Kingdom
- Original language: English
- No. of seasons: 2
- No. of episodes: 12

Production
- Executive producers: Ben Harris; Jon Mankell; Chris Lunt; Michael A. Walker
- Producer: Berna Levin
- Cinematography: Gaute Gunnari
- Running time: 36–52 minutes
- Production company: Yellow Bird

Original release
- Network: Netflix
- Release: 3 September 2020 – 17 February 2022

Young Wallander is a crime drama television series, based on Henning Mankell's fictional Inspector Kurt Wallander. The series premiered on Netflix on 3 September 2020. Star Adam Pålsson explained that the pre-imagining (i.e., Young Wallander being set in the present day) made more sense than a straight prequel, as it allowed for the social commentary which is a strong element of Mankell's original Wallander. This choice of setting the series in the modern day has been criticised in a number of reviews.

In November 2020, Young Wallander was renewed for a second series, which was premiered on Netflix on 17 February 2022, subtitled as Killer's Shadow. There are no plans for a third series.

== Premise ==
Young Wallander is a young, edgy, and modern series that sees Henning Mankell's iconic detective, Kurt Wallander, investigate his gripping first case. The story focuses on the formative experiences – professional and personal – faced by Kurt as a recently graduated police officer in his early twenties.

— Netflix

== Cast and characters ==
- Adam Pålsson as Kurt Wallander
- Richard Dillane as Superintendent Josef Hemberg (series 1)
- Leanne Best as Frida Rask
- Ellise Chappell as Mona
- Yasen Atour as Reza Al-Rahman
- Charles Mnene as Bashir "Bash"
- Jacob Collins-Levy as Karl-Axel Munck (series 1)
- Alan Emrys as Gustav Munck (series 1)
- Jack Bandeira as Markus
- Kiza Deen as Mariam
- Jordan Adene as Ibra (series 1)
- Josef Davies as Sören
- Tomiwa Edun as Superintendent Samuel Osei (series 2)
- Lisa Hammond as Roberta Modin (series 2)
- Lewis Mackinnon as Elias Fager (series 2)
- Kim Adis as Katja Nilssen (series 2)

== Episodes ==
=== Series overview ===
Series overview
Series	Title	Episodes	Originally released
1	Young Wallander	6	3 September 2020
2	Killer's Shadow	6	17 February 2022

=== Season 1 (2020) ===
No. overall	No. in season	Title	Directed by	Written by	Original release date
1	1	"Episode 1"	Ole Endresen	Ben Harris	September 3, 2020
In Malmö, a young Kurt Wallander becomes witness when local Hugo Lundgren, who is tied to a fence with a grenade in his mouth, blows up in his neighbourhood. The police suspect Ibra, a young boy who lives in his neighbourhood, whom Wallander also knows. He promises the boy's mother to find out why he was suspected. Despite his efforts, he learns that the police have evidence based on the boy's arguments with Lundgren the same day before he died. Lundgren's murder sparks anti-immigration protests in the city, which Wallander is attached to. Amid the protests, neo-nazis burst through the protesters, causing havoc, and start attacking bystanders and other officers. Wallander sees the man from the scene of Lundgren's murder and chases him through a subway station before cornering him by a locked gate. The man chants in a foreign language as Wallander moves in to arrest him, but the man pulls out a knife and stabs him before fleeing.
2	2	"Episode 2"	Ole Endresen	Ben Schiffer	September 3, 2020
Waking up in the hospital, Wallander discovers that Reza has been placed into intensive care after the anti-immigration protests spiralled out of control. He and Hemberg later talk to Hugo Lundgren's parents again about their son's whereabouts. While Wallander speaks to the father, Hemberg talks to the mother, who reveals that she knew that Hugo snuck out the night of his death and that the father was informed to cause him any stress. Wallander speaks to Mona, a pro-immigration protester who works at a local shelter, about the man he was chasing. She also treats his wound before leaving. Hemberg and Wallander speak to Isak, Hugo's best friend, who reveals that they both frequented a nightclub named The Cube, and on the night of his death, Isak had left him there. Hemberg questions Ibra's mother, who subsequently reveals that she didn't know about Ibra's whereabouts after going to bed. At The Cube, Wallander speaks to Bash about supporting Ibra, which he is reluctant to do, but later agrees. On his way out, Wallander is attacked by club guards.
3	3	"Episode 3"	Ole Endresen	Jessica Ruston	September 3, 2020
Wallander wakes up beside a lake and struggles his way back to the city. He returns to the church, where Mona again tends to his wounds. Continuing to work with Hugo Lundgren's case, Wallander and Rask talk to Gustav Munck, the founder of the Munck Foundation. They inquire if he knows anything about their suspect, who Wallander suspects after all were staying at the church shelter. Munck gives them the address for the newly located shelter, where they speak to the refugees about if they have seen their suspect. However, in the midst of it, they are called to Lundgren's football club, where Rickard Lundgren has threatened the coach. Wallander manages to talk him down and brings him back home. Bash also gives a statement to the police, which leads to Ibra getting released. Reza's wife, Jasmine, receives news that he has woken up in hospital. The next day, when Wallander arrives at the relocated shelter, Yara, one of the refugees he spoke to, has been reported missing after having not shown up to her doctor's appointment. The police manage to track her phone after she made a 23-second call to her husband and discover that she is in Västra Ingelstad. Wallander arrives in the forest where Yara is, together with her husband Zemar. He reveals that he was blackmailed by a powerful man into supposedly killing Hugo Lundgren. Reinforcements arrive and bring Yara and Zemar to the station, where an unknown sniper shoots him.
4	4	"Episode 4"	Jens Jonsson	Anoo Bhagavan	September 3, 2020
Wallander, Hemberg, and other police officers storm the neighbouring building of the police station and make their way to the roof, where they discover that the sniper is Rickard Lundgren, Hugo's father, who is arrested and claims that he gave his son justice by killing Zemar. Yara is later questioned about Zemar, detailing that the man that had blackmailed him, had threatened to deport them if he didn't do as he was told. She also explains that Zemar did small jobs prior to his last assignment. After expressing a theory about the blackmailer, Hemberg sends Wallander to take a few days off work. In the meantime, he discovers that Ibra has gotten involved with a local gang, and later gets Bash to look into it. He also visits Reza, and they look into the Lundgren case and the church attack, and discover a common connection to the Munck Foundation, though Reza points out there is no clear motive, which also Hemberg told Wallander earlier. Wallander later convinces Rask to assist him with the Muncks after discovering that Hugo's best friend, Isak, was in a photograph with Karl-Axel. Karl-Axel claims that he barely knows Isak, though Wallander suspects otherwise. He later finds Isak at a crack house after he is reported missing, and Isak explains that he was involved with drugs and that he fears that the people he owes a debt to are after him. He argues that it must be the same killer given that his dog and Hugo were both killed with a grenade and that Gustav Munck was the one who hosted the parties he sold drugs at.
5	5	"Episode 5"	Jens Jonsson	Ben Harris	September 3, 2020
Feeling that Gustav Munck has a connection to Hugo Lundgren and his murder, Wallander goes to the 70th birthday party for Leopold Munck, hosted by the Munck family with Mona to try and get something out of Gustav. At the party, he also encounters Leopold's ex-wife before questioning Gustav. He denies that he knows Hugo and accuses Wallander of throwing around accusations before asking him to leave. Mona expresses anger at Kurt for using her to question Gustav. Wallander later sees Ibra with a gang on his way home and asks Bash for help. He confronts the rival gang that beats Ibra and Bash interrupts, managing to calm the tension. At the police station, Isak is brought in to identify the man who threatened him, who turns out to be one of the enforcers at The Cube, but the club has closed. The investigation later connects arms dealer Eman "Dodo" Dodovitch to the Munck family, but Dodovitch proves it was legal business. With Reza's help, Wallander digs into Gustav Munck's past, expecting to find something that proves his theory that Gustav was in the shadows of his brother Karl-Axel. They discover a case from his boarding school where a younger student was tortured, which had led to Munck getting expelled. However, the school never reported the incident. Wallander later speaks to the victim, Thomas Van Rosen, who reluctantly gives him an account of what happened. However, he also reveals that Gustav was not the one who tortured him.
6	6	"Episode 6"	Jens Jonsson	Ben Harris	September 3, 2020
Wallander manages to convince Hemberg and Rask that Karl-Axel Munck is responsible for the murder of Hugo Lundgren, but Hemberg points out that they don't have concrete evidence. As a result, Wallander begins to follow Munck and is told by Hemberg to have patience. Wallander later speaks to Leopold Munck, who reveals that he had changed the inheritance to Gustav because he had built the foundation from the ground up. Wallander concludes that Karl-Axel wasn't aware of the change. The Commissioner questions Karl-Axel's motives and reveals that Munck's funds youth programmes, shelter, and other social projects. Hemberg and Wallander speak to Karl-Axel themselves, using their questioning about Dodo as a diversion to get DNA samples, which Hemberg manages. They conclude that Karl-Axel must have wanted to get rid of his brother to stay relevant to their father. Wallander concludes that Karl-Axel must have targeted Gustav's newly opened shelter; however, it's revealed that the bomb is not there. Wallander concludes that Karl-Axel did know about the inheritance change after discovering that it took effect the previous Thursday. He learns from Mona that Gustav had canceled the shelter's opening in favour of looking into the new Munck shipping facility. He and Hemberg race to the facility, securing Gustav and the workers. However, the bomb is in Gustav's car and explodes, killing Hemberg in the process. Though Wallander and Rask question Karl-Axel, he denies responsibility but gives them gratitude for saving Gustav's life. Following Hemberg's death, Wallander resigns from the police and invites Mona to his home for the first time.

=== Season 2 (2022) ===
No. overall	No. in season	Title	Directed by	Written by	Original release date
7	1	"Episode 1"	Jens Jonsson	Chris Lunt, Michael A. Walker	February 17, 2022
After he reconsiders leaving law enforcement, Kurt is assigned to identify the victim in a standard hit-and-run case that turns out to be anything but.
8	2	"Episode 2"	Jens Jonsson	Chris Lunt, Michael A. Walker	February 17, 2022
The death of Elias Fager goes public thanks to a leak that infuriates new superintendent Osei. Reza reveals his lingering bitterness toward Kurt.
9	3	"Episode 3"	Jens Jonsson	Chris Lunt, Michael A. Walker	February 17, 2022
Internal Affairs asks hard questions about Rask's interrogation of Elias eight years ago. Kurt realizes an eyewitness isn't telling the whole truth.
10	4	"Episode 4"	Mani Maserrat-Agah	Chris Lunt, Michael A. Walker	February 17, 2022
Following another murder, Rask is taken off the case by Osei. Kurt begins working with a new partner to follow a trail that leads them into the past.
11	5	"Episode 5"	Mani Maserrat-Agah	Chris Lunt, Michael A. Walker	February 17, 2022
Reza develops a theory about the night of the murder that casts suspicion on someone uncomfortably close by — but feels that Kurt is holding him back.
12	6	"Episode 6"	Mani Maserrat-Agah	Chris Lunt, Michael A. Walker	February 17, 2022
The puzzle pieces of two cases years apart finally fit together, leading the detectives to startling conclusions about a senior government official.

== Production ==
On 11 September 2019, it was announced that filming had begun. Although set in Malmö, Sweden, it was shot in and around Vilnius, Lithuania.

== Reception ==
On the review aggregator website Rotten Tomatoes, 64% of 14 critics' reviews for the first season are positive. The website's consensus reads, "Bearing little resemblance to the beloved procedural it presumes to reboot, Young Wallander is dispiritingly unenlightening as a prequel and merely functional as a drama in its own right."

The Guardian's Ellen E. Jones gave the series three out of five stars writing: "Netflix's prequel to the Wallander novels and TV series takes place in the present day, weaving in contemporary politics – but would a straight origin story have been better?" Jones felt a more traditional prequel set in the 1970s may have been more interesting: "Just imagine if the show had researched and recreated 70s Malmö, where the Henriksson-timeline Wallander would have been a rookie? Imagine exploring how that very specific time and place – the era of plane hijacking, radical politics and Abba's Eurovision win – shaped Wallander's character? Now that would have been a case worth digging into."

Chris Bennion of The Telegraph rated the series one star out of five. "Here we have it, ladies and gentlemen – surely the worst TV drama of the streaming era. Or, to put it another way, if you loved Wallander, you'll hate Young Wallander."

Beth Webb of NME gave it three out of five stars. Webb states, "Despite its strong aesthetic, the show's target audience seems unclear. Wallander has built a sizeable following over its extended lifespan, and older fans may struggle to connect with this modern version. But the story doesn't feel suitable for a younger audience either. As a short, suspense-laden crime drama, this is a justifiable watch, especially with its low-episode count. For those seeking another dose of their favourite seasoned Swedish inspector, however, you're better off revisiting the original."
