= Gustav Levin =

Swedish actor (born 1952)

Tor Gustav Ebbe Levin (born 10 September 1952 in Sigtuna, Sweden) is a Swedish actor. He studied at Skara Skolscen and later at the Swedish National Academy of Mime and Acting.

== Filmography ==
=== Film ===
- Pillertrillaren (1994)
- The Christmas Oratorio (1996)
- Under ytan (1997)
- Hamilton (1998)
- Miffo (2003)
- Van Veeteren: Moreno och tystnaden (2006)
- Offside (2006)
- Beck – I Guds namn (2007)
- Cockpit (2012)

=== Television ===
- Tre kärlekar (1989)
- Snoken (1993-1996)
- Skärgårdsdoktorn (1997)
- Woman with Birthmark (2001)
- Tusenbröder (2002)
- Oskyldigt dömd (2008)
