= Tidstjuven =

- Country of origin: Sweden
- Original language: Swedish
- No. of episodes: 24

Original release
- Network: SVT1; SVT Barn; SVT Play
- Release: 1 December – 24 December 2025

Related
- Snödrömmar (2024); Den Ofrivillige Tomten (2026 TV-Serie) (2026)

Tidstjuven (English: The Time Thief) is the Sveriges Television's Christmas calendar series for 2025. It was broadcast daily from 1 December to 24 December 2025 (Christmas Eve).

== Plot ==
In 2025, eleven-year-old Clint Östskog investigates the mysterious disappearance of his father on Christmas Eve in 2020. Ever since that day, Clint hates everything about Christmas. On 1 December, Clint meets the time travelling thief Bildsköne Bengtsson, who has binoculars which can be used for time travel. Clint realizes that his father might be stuck in the age of the Vikings after finding the binoculars.

== Cast ==
- Simon J. Berger – Bildsköne Bengtsson
- Gusten Wickberg – Clint Östskog
  - Billie Wadman – Clint 5 years
- Blanca Eliasson – Vida
- Maja Rung – Moa (mother)
- Inger Nilsson – Nettan
- Lisette Pagler – Cindy
- Christoffer Nyqvist – Ingo
- Fredrik Lexfors – Mårten
- Sissela Kyle – Sirpa
- Per Svensson – Erland
- Richard Ulfsäter – Pontus (father)
- Siham Shurafa – Aissa
- Andreas Rothlin Svensson – Gustav Vasa
- Elvira Ral Lustig – Märta
- Lennart Bäck – försäljaren
- Johannes Bah Kuhnke – Jacop Andersen
- Linda Ulvaeus – maid Maria
- Emelie Florén – witch
- Loa Falkman – häxdomare
- Pennie Helsén – Lisa
- Aminah Al Fakir – sister Vendela
- Cecilia Nilsson – abbedissa
- Bengt-Åke Rundqvist – man 1700s
- Johannes Kuhnke – Bråke
- Magnus Samuelsson – Esbjörn Holmgång
- Björn Ulvaeus – himself
- Mark Levengood – himself
