= Snödrömmar =

- Country of origin: Sweden
- Original language: Swedish
- No. of episodes: 24

Original release
- Network: SVT1; SVT Barn; SVT Play
- Release: 1 December – 24 December 2024

Related
- Trolltider - legenden om Bergatrollet (2023); Tidstjuven (2025)

Snödrömmar (English: Snow Dreams) is the Sveriges Television's Christmas calendar series for 2024. It was broadcast daily from 1 December to 24 December 2024 (Christmas Eve).

Swedish is the main language of the series, with some Southern Sámi. There is also a version dubbed in Southern Sámi and a version subtitled in Northern Sámi.

== Plot ==
Snödrömmar is a story about a Southern Sami family that run a ski resort. No snow falls this year—mysteriously, only on their particular mountain—putting their home and livelihood at risk. The family's two daughters Ristin and Aila become involved in a quest to find out the reason and bring back the snow.

Their recently deceased grandmother had known the secret behind the strange occurrence, and her spirit guides them. City councillor Lena wants the resort to fail so that she can build an arena on the site, and uses underhand tactics against the family. The girls' mother Maggan tries to keep the business running, including pandering to her guests, an obnoxious food influencer and his girlfriend.

== Roles ==
- Ellá Márge Nutti – Ristin
- Hedvig Åhrén – Aila
- Anna Åsdell – mother Maggan
- Pávva Pittja – Nils-Anders
- Christine Meltzer – Lena
- Olle Sarri – Sören
- Måns Nathanaelson – Olle
- Shirley Clamp – Rebecka
- Olov-Anders Sikku – Antaris
- Andreas Lantz – mysterious man
- Nik Märak – Sire
- Ánndaris Rimpi – Krästa
- Per-Henrik Marakatt – Dortje
- Maj-Doris Rimpi – Stina
- Ola Stinnerbom – Per Markus
- Maxida Märak – herself
- Jörgen Stenberg – joiker
