= Malin Lagerlöf =

Swedish screenwriter and playwright (born 1968)

- Born: 1968 (age 57–58) Lidingö, Sweden
- Occupation: Screenwriter; playwright
- Spouse: Daniel Lind Lagerlöf
- Children: 3

Malin Lagerlöf (born 1968), also credited as Malin Lagerlöf-Holst, is a Swedish screenwriter and playwright. She had a number of collaborations with director husband Daniel Lind Lagerlöf, until his disappearance in 2011. She was nominated for the Guldbagge Award for Best Screenplay for Breaking Out (1999).

== Life and career ==
She was born in 1968 in Lidingö. She is the youngest of five born to a civil engineer father and a homemaker mother. She wrote Baby Jane, which premiered at Stockholm City Theater in 1993. Another of her plays, I badhuset, was shown at Storsjöteatern the following year. Lagerlöf wrote Fången på fyren, a play about Swedish Maritime Administration whistleblower and scapegoat Anders Ahlmark. It premiered in 1995 at Gothenburg City Theater, with direction by Eva Dahlman.

For Breaking Out (1999), she was nominated for the Guldbagge Award for Best Screenplay. She was the screenwriter for Miffo (2003), directed by Daniel Lind Lagerlöf. The film received a positive review from Gunnar Rehlin in Variety. She collaborated again with Lind Lagerlöf again on Road to Italy (2005). The film received a positive review from Gunnar Rehlin in Variety. Jens Peterson and Jeanette Gentele gave it mixed reviews in Aftonbladet and Svenska Dagbladet, respectively.

Her husband disappeared on 6 October 2011 while scouting filming locations at the Tjurpannan Nature Reserve outside Tanumshede in Bohuslän. They had three children together. She later wrote a book about the experience of his disappearance, Dagbok från ditt försvinnande (2016). Alongside Mats Strandberg, she wrote the 2025 series Blood Cruise.

== Writing credits ==
=== Screenwriting ===
Year	Title	Notes	Ref.
1999	Breaking Out		
2001	Making Babies		
2003	Miffo		
2005	Road to Italy		
2017	Farang	TV series	
2024	Så länge hjärtat slår		

=== Playwriting ===
Year	Title	Notes	Ref.
1993	Baby Jane		
1994	I badhuset		
1994	Elva nätter före jul		
1995	Fången på fyren		
2001	Olof Palmes leende		
2012	Fursten		
