= Gunn Wållgren Award =

Swedish theatre award

The Gunn Wållgren Award (Swedish: Gunn Wållgren-stipendiet), also translated as Gunn Wållgren Stipend or Gunn Wållgren Scholarship, is an annual Swedish theatre award. Two awards are given each year: one to an actor or actress, and one to an opera singer.

== History and description ==
The Gunn Wållgren Award (or Stipend, or Scholarship) was established in memory and honour of notable Swedish stage and film actress Gunn Wållgren (1913–1983). The Gunn Wållgren Memorial Fund was established in 1984.

Grants from the Gunn Wållgren Memorial Fund are jointly awarded by the Royal Dramatic Theatre, the Royal Swedish Opera, and the Royal Swedish Academy of Music. Awards are given out annually on the anniversary of Wållgren's birthday (November 16) to a young promising Swedish actress of the stage, described as “artistically deserving dramatic and lyrical artists”.

As of 2026 the prize sum consists of 40,000 Swedish krona for each recipient.

== Recipients ==
=== Actors ===
Year	Awardee(s)	Ref.
1989	Lena Endre	
2006	Livia Millhagen	
2010	Magnus Ehrner	
2011	Kicki Bramberg	
2014	Per Mattsson	
2016	Magnus Roosmann	
2018	Karl-Magnus Fredriksson	
2024	David Fukamachi Regnfors	
2026	Lindy Larsson	

=== Opera singers ===
Opera singers have been receiving awards from the foundation since 1987.

In 2014, Marianne Hellgren Staykov was the recipient of the scholarship.

Johanna Rudström received the Gunn Wållgren scholarship in 2024.

Karolina Blixt was the recipient of the opera award in 2026.
