= Breaking Out (film) =

- Swedish cover.
- Directed by: Daniel Lind Lagerlöf
- Written by: Malin Lind Lagerlöf
- Produced by: Peter Possne
- Starring: Björn Kjellman; Shanti Roney; Peter Haber; Viveka Seldahl; Michael Nyqvist; Thomas Hanzon
- Distributed by: Sonet Film
- Release date: 19 February 1999 (Sweden)
- Running time: 103 minutes
- Country: Sweden
- Language: Swedish

Breaking Out (Swedish title: Vägen ut) is a 1999 Swedish comedy-drama film directed by Daniel Lind Lagerlöf.

== Plot ==
The film is about stage actor Reine who quits his job because he is tired of his boss messing people around. He takes a job at the Kumla Prison in hope that he can set up a play acted by the prisoners. The prisoners are not very interested until five of them realize that if they agree to do the play, they can escape while at a theatre. As the plot evolves, the actors are to various degrees forced to weigh this to their strengthening desire to do the play.

== Cast ==
- Björn Kjellman as Reine
- Shanti Roney as Glenn
- Peter Haber as Jakobsson
- Viveka Seldahl as Hillevi
- Michael Nyqvist as Diego
- Thomas Hanzon as Ekman
- Göran Ragnerstam as Heikki
- Oliver Loftéen as Andrej
- Lamine Dieng as Kostas
