= Ingela Olsson =

Swedish actress (born 1958)

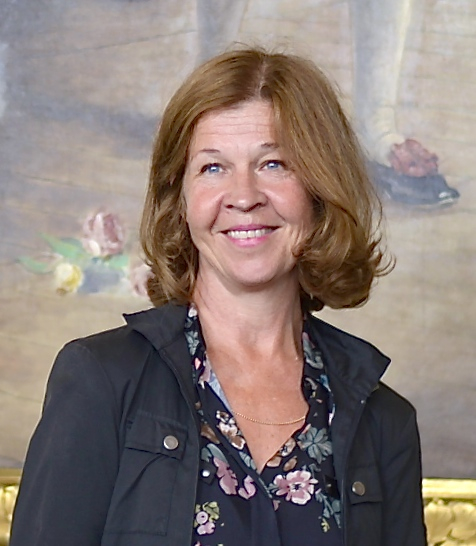
Ingela Olsson in August 2014

Ingela Maria Olsson (born 28 February 1958 in Nybro, Sweden) is a Swedish actress.

Olsson was active in many different theatre groups during the 1980s. She started working at the Galeasen theatre in 1989, and appeared at the Stockholm City Theatre, Parkteatern, Orionteatern, Royal Dramatic Theatre, and radioteatern. Her film debut, in 1989 was Annika Silkeberg's Ömheten. She is most commonly known for her part as Inger in Så som i himmelen.

== Filmography ==
- 2021 - Young Royals (Netflix series)
- 2018 – The Truth Will Out (TV series)
- 2004 - As It Is in Heaven
- 2003 - Detaljer
- 2003 - Järnvägshotellet (TV)
- 2002 - Skeppsholmen (TV series guest role)
- 2001 - Beck – Hämndens pris
- 2001 - Hans och hennes
- 2000 - Skärgårdsdoktorn (TV series guest role)
- 2000 - Dubbel-8
- 1997 - Emma åklagare (TV series guest role)
- 1992 - Rederiet (TV series)
