= Helsingborg City Theatre =

Theatre in Helsingborg, Sweden

Coordinates: 56°3′1.2″N 12°41′18.9″E

Helsingborg City Theatre (Swedish: Helsingborgs stadsteater) is the city theatre of Helsingborg, Sweden.

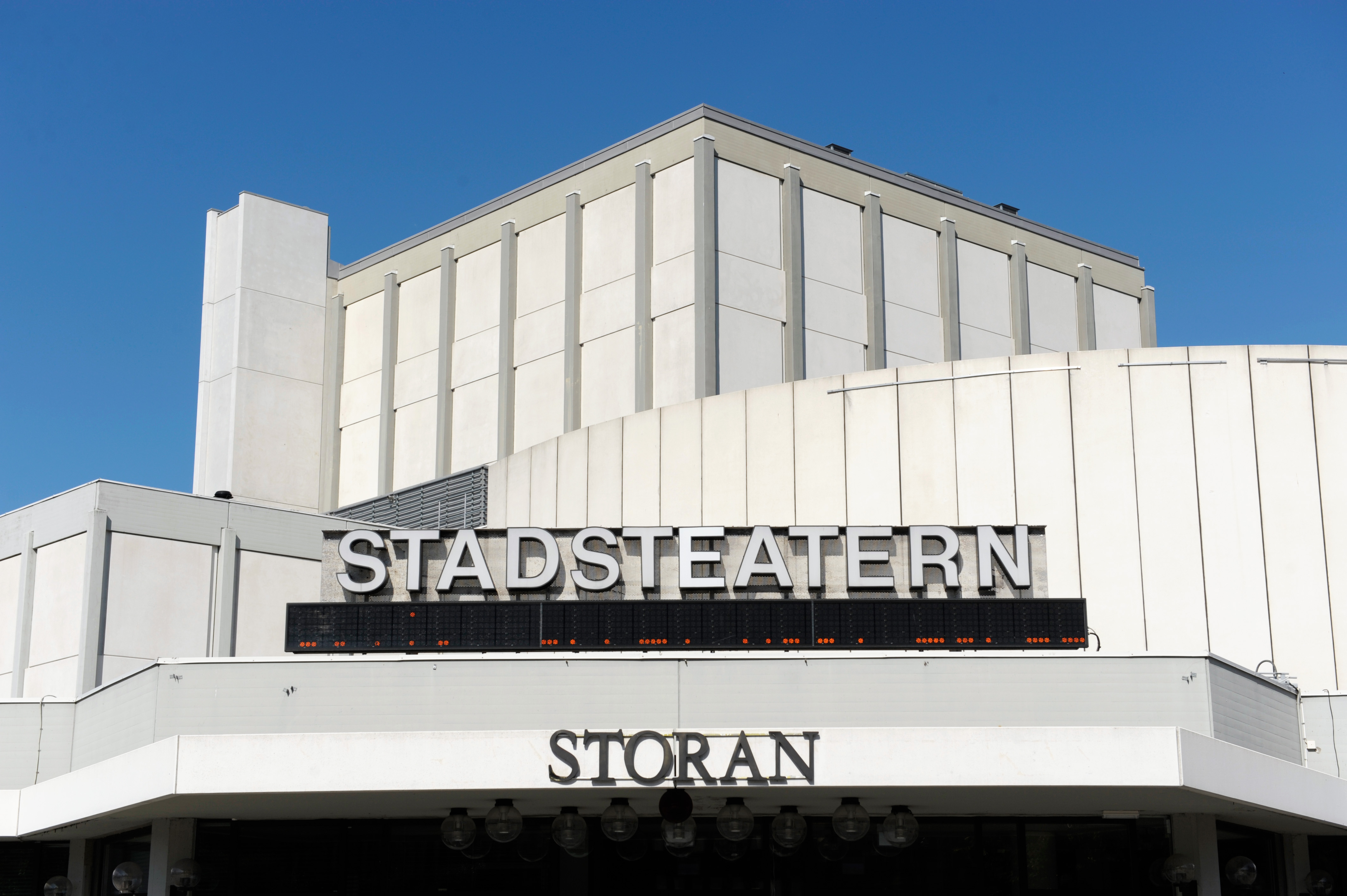
Helsingborg City Theatre

The present Helsingborg City Theatre was built in 1921, after the old Helsingborg Theatre (located at the same place, built in 1877) was demolished. The building was designed by the local architectural firm Arkitektfirman Arton. But even before that the location harboured a small theatre house dating back to 1821. Being a well-placed geographical link between Sweden and Denmark, Helsingborg has a proud and steady theatre tradition, particularly from European guest touring theatre companies.

The theatre's productions became famous through the management of director Ingmar Bergman, who managed Helsingborg City Theatre in the years 1944–46. In 2010, Ingmar Bergman square was named after him to honour his contributions to the city's theater-culture. The theater underwent several major reorganizations during the 2000s and since 1 January 2015 has been part of the municipal company Helsingborg Arena & Scen AB.
