= Margaretha Byström =

Swedish actress (born 1937)

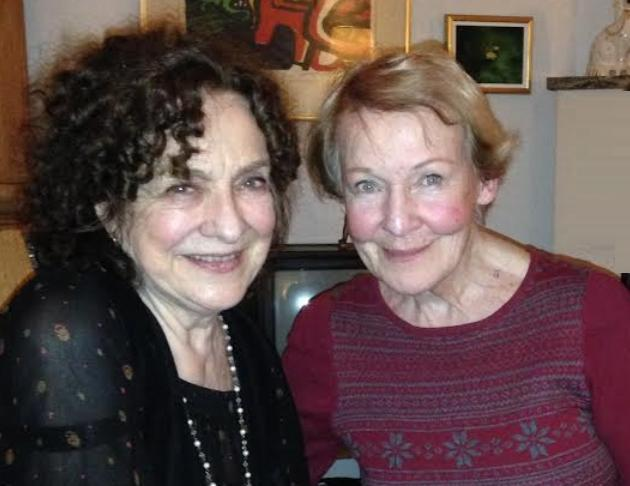
Byström (right) at the 86th birthday party of Gunvor Pontén (left) in Stockholm, February 11 2015

Margaretha Byström (born 2 August 1937, in Stockholm) is a Swedish actress (film, theater, television), writer and director. Margaretha is most famous for her portrayal as the elegant and ambitious Katarina Remmer in the long running Swedish soap opera Rederiet.

== Selected filmography ==
- Summer Paradise (1977)
- A Walk in the Sun (1978)
