= Jonas Karlsson =

Swedish actor and author (born 1971)

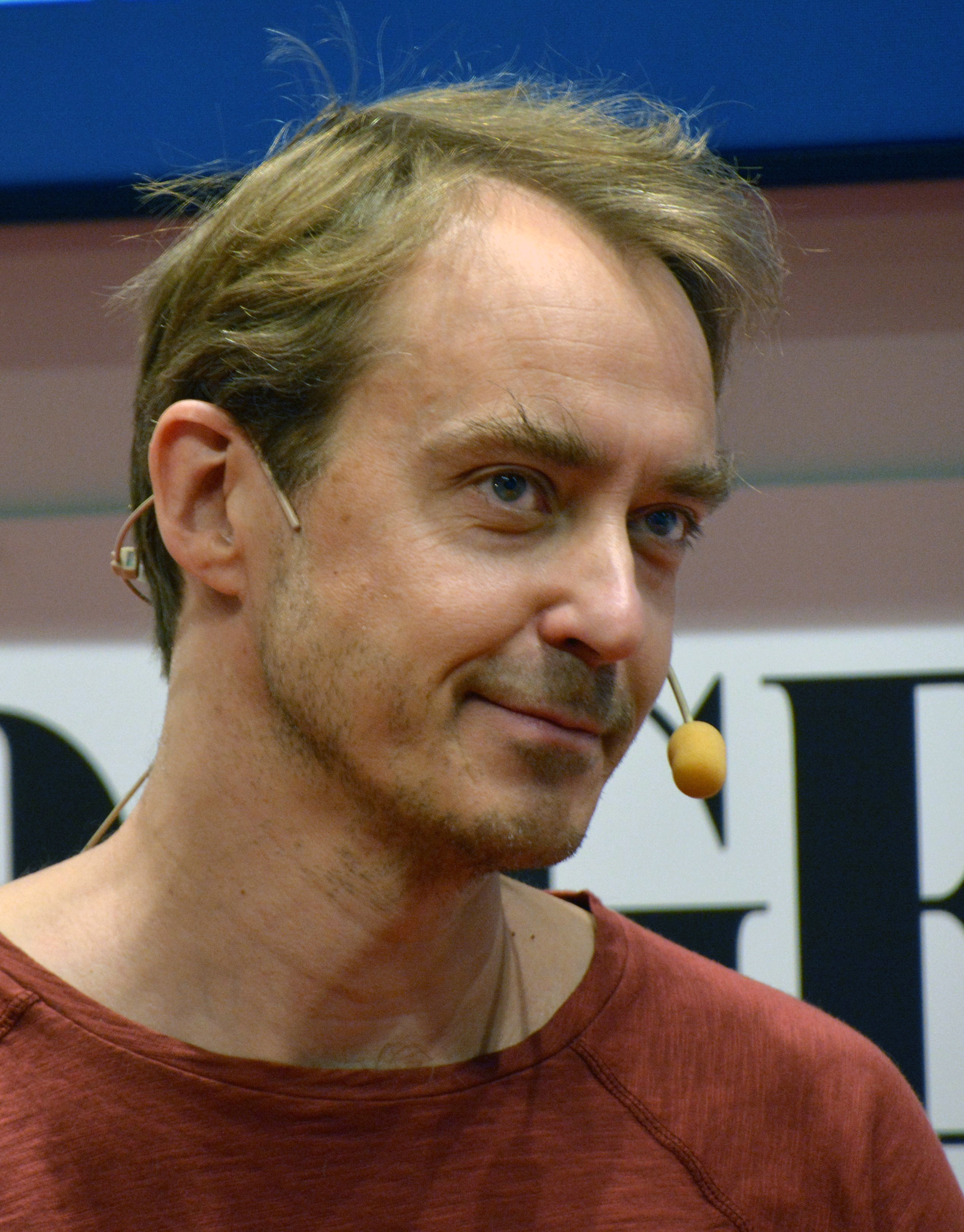
- Karlsson in 2019
- Born: Sven Bert Jonas Karlsson; 11 March 1971 (age 55); Salem, Sweden
- Occupations: Actor; author
- Years active: 1981–present
- Awards: Guldbagge Award for Best Actor in a Leading Role (2004, 2022)

Sven Bert Jonas Karlsson (born 11 March 1971) is a Swedish actor and author. He has won two Guldbagge Award for Best Actor in a Leading Role, the first for Details (2003) and the second for Sagan om Karl-Bertil Jonssons julafton (2021).

== Early life ==
Sven Bert Jonas Karlsson was born on 11 March 1971 in Salem, Sweden. He grew up in Värmdö.

== Career ==
=== Acting ===
He made his film debut in Rasmus på luffen (1981), at the age of ten.

Karlsson co-starred with Johanna Sällström in Making Babies (2001). Both their performances were positively received by Olov Andersson in Aftonbladet.

He and Livia Millhagen played Johan and Marianne, respectively, in a 2009 stage adaptation of Ingmar Bergmans's 1973 miniseries Scenes from a Marriage. The production, directed by Stefan Larsson, premiered at the Royal Dramatic Theater. Expressen theater critic Margareta Sörenson praised the performances of both Millhagen and Karlsson.

He won a Guldbagge Award for Best Actor in 2004 for the movie Details.

He appeared in Black Mirror's third season finale, "Hated in the Nation."

For his role as Tommy Lund in Riding in Darkness (2022), he was nominated for Best Male Performance in a Television Production at Kristallen 2023. He also earned an International Emmy nomination.

=== Writing ===
In 2007, he made his literary debut with the short story collection Det andra målet. His second short story collection Den perfekte vännen was released in 2009, and received praise from Jonas Thente in Dagens Nyheter.

He wrote three short novels that were translated into English: The Room, The Invoice, and The Circus. The Room was adapted into the 2022 American English-language film Corner Office starring Jon Hamm. His writing often features weird characters and Kafkaesque surrealism.

== Acting credits ==
=== Film ===
Year	Title	Role	Notes	Ref.
1981	Rasmus på luffen			
1993	Sökarna			
1999	Tsatsiki, morsan och polisen			
2000	Once in a Lifetime			
2001	Tsatsiki – vänner för alltid			
2001	Making Babies			
2003	Details			
2004	Strings			
2005	Storm			
2005	Bang Bang Orangutang			
2006	Offside			
2010	Bad Faith - Ond Tro			
2012	Cockpit	Valle		
2017	The Snowman			
2018	Ted – För kärlekens skull			
2021	Sagan om Karl-Bertil Jonssons julafton	Tyko Johnsson		
2022	Together 99	Jonas		
2024	Jönssonligan kommer tillbaka	Vanheden		
2025	The Von Fersens		Netflix	

=== Television ===
Year	Title	Role	Notes	Ref.
2015–2023	Beck			
2016	Black Mirror	Rasmus Sjöberg	Episode: "Hated in the Nation"	
2019	Riding in Darkness	Tommy Lund		
2024–present	Doktrinen			
2026	Vaka			

=== Theater ===
Year	Title	Role	Theater	Notes	Ref.
2009	Scenes from a Marriage	Johan	Royal Dramatic Theater	Little stage	
2015	Ladykillers	The Professor	Oscar Theater		
2019	Waiting for Godot	Estragon	Royal Dramatic Theater	Little stage	

== Bibliography ==
- Det andra målet (2007)
- Den perfekte vännen : noveller (2009)
- Spår i Snön (2011)
- Spelreglerna (2012)
- God jul : en berättelse (2013)
- Fakturan (2014)

== Awards and nominations ==
Year	Award	Work	Result	Ref.
2004	Guldbagge Award for Best Actor in a Leading Role	Details	Won	
2021	Guldbagge Award for Best Actor in a Leading Role	Sagan om Karl-Bertil Jonssons julafton	Won	
