= Staffan Valdemar Holm =

Swedish-German theatre director (born 1958)

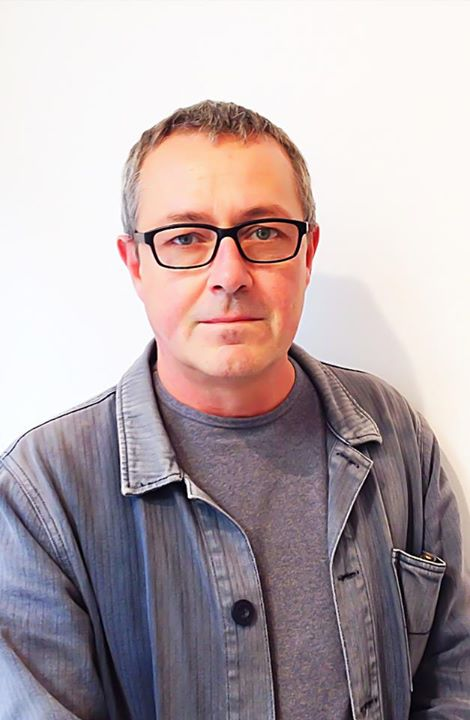
Staffan Valdemar Holm (2012)

Staffan Valdemar Holm (born 7 October 1958 in Tomelilla, Skåne) is a Swedish-German theatre director.

Staffan Valdemar Holm was trained at Statens Teaterskole in Copenhagen, Denmark. He was managing director of the Royal Dramatic Theatre in Stockholm, Sweden, 2002-08.

Staffan Valdemar Holm is from 2011 managing director (Generalintendent) of Düsseldorfer Schauspielhaus in Düsseldorf, Germany.
