= Making Babies (2001 film) =

2001 film by Daniel Lind Lagerlöf

- Swedish cover.
- Directed by: Daniel Lind Lagerlöf
- Written by: Malin Lagerlöf
- Produced by: Daniel Lind Lagerlöf
- Starring: Jonas Karlsson, Johanna Sällström, Shanti Roney
- Distributed by: Hägring AB, Sonet Film
- Release date: 2001
- Running time: 96 minuter
- Language: Swedish

Making Babies (Swedish title: Hans och hennes) is a Swedish film from 2001, directed by Daniel Lind Lagerlöf.

Johan and Anna-Karin live somewhere in the countryside. Despite attempts, Anna-Karin can't get pregnant and the relationship with Johan is suffering because he never shoots.

== Characters ==
- Jonas Karlsson - Johan
- Johanna Sällström - Anna-Karin
- Ralph Carlsson - Henrik
- Shanti Roney - Clarence
- Michalis Koutsogiannakis - Dimitris
- Lisa Lindgren - Åsa

== Reviews ==
The film was reviewed by Aftonbladet, Nöjesguiden, TV Guide, and others.
