= Beck (Swedish TV series) =

Swedish crime drama television series

- Genre: Crime drama
- Based on: Martin Beck – The Story of a Crime by Maj Sjöwall and Per Wahlöö
- Developed by: Rolf Börjlind
- Written by: Rolf Börjlind; Cilla Börjlind
- Starring: Peter Haber; Mikael Persbrandt; Malin Birgerson; Ingvar Hirdwall; Rebecka Hemse; Måns Nathanaelson; Peter Hüttner; Stina Rautelin; Marie Göranzon; Anna Asp; Elmira Arikan; Jonas Karlsson; Åsa Karlin; Bo Höglund; Kristofer Hivju; Jennie Silfverhjelm; Martin Wallström
- Composer: Adam Nordén
- Country of origin: Sweden
- Original language: Swedish
- No. of seasons: 10
- No. of episodes: 54

Production
- Executive producer: Lars Blomgren
- Producer: Tomas Michaelsson
- Cinematography: Olof Johnson
- Editor: Tomas Täng
- Running time: 90 minutes (approx.)
- Production company: Filmlance International AB

Original release
- Network: Egmont Film
- Release: 27 June 1997 – present

Beck is a Swedish crime drama movie series, based on characters featured in the Martin Beck novels of Maj Sjöwall and Per Wahlöö, starring Peter Haber as the titular character. The first three series and two specials were released direct-to-video, with a small number of episodes also concurrently released theatrically. To date, fifty four episodes have been filmed, with all episodes from the fourth series onwards broadcast on C More.

The first series was written entirely by Rolf Börjlind, while several episodes in series two and three, and the two specials, were co-written by Rolf and Cilla Börjlind. From the books, the character of Kollberg is entirely omitted from the TV series. Mikael Persbrandt announced in 2015 that he would be leaving the series to focus on other projects, although he did return to film Gunvald, the first episode of series six. In 2015, the series was acquired by the BBC as part of their international crime drama slate. The first episode to be broadcast was Buried Alive, on BBC Four.

== Cast ==
- Peter Haber as Martin Beck
- Mikael Persbrandt as Gunvald Larsson (Series 1–5)
- Rebecka Hemse as Inger Beck
- Ingvar Hirdwall as neighbour Valdemar (Series 1–9)
- Peter Hüttner as coroner Oljelund (Series 1–Specials)
- Stina Rautelin as Lena Klingström (Series 1–Specials)
- Malin Birgerson as Alice Levander (Series 2)
- Bo Höglund as waiter Mats (Series 1–Specials)
- Marie Göranzon as Margareta Oberg (Series 2–3)
- Måns Nathanaelson as Oskar Bergman (Series 3–)
- Anna Asp as Jenny Bodén (Series 4–10)
- Elmira Arikan as Ayda Çetin (Series 4–)
- Jonas Karlsson as Klas Fredén (Series 4–9)
- Åsa Karlin as Andrea Bergström (Series 4–8)
- Kristofer Hivju as Steinar Hovland (Series 5–)
- Jennie Silfverhjelm as Alexandra 'Alex' Beijer (Series 6–)
- Martin Wallström as Josef Eriksson (Series 7–)
- Valter Skarsgård as Vilhelm Beck (Series 8–)
- Nina Zanjani as Ebba Ståhl (Series 10–)

== Episodes ==
=== Series 1 (1997–1998) ===
No. overall	No. in season	Title	Directed by	Written by	Original release date
1	1	"Beck – Lockpojken" "The Decoy Boy"	Pelle Seth	Rolf Börjlind	27 June 1997
A person who works at the incineration plant in Stockholm finds a body among the garbage on his way to the oven. Martin Beck has to take care of the difficult case. He assumes that a very brutal murder has been committed, but he does not know when, where, or how. His only clue is a coded address on the Internet, from a man who will murder again.
2	2	"Beck – Mannen med ikonerna" "The Man with the Icons"	Pelle Seth	Rolf Börjlind	17 December 1997
A Russian petty criminal gets caught by his own mistakes in a major criminal tangle. Those who have taken hold of him know all about his past. A rather miserable background bordered by house murders, looting, and smuggling.
3	3	"Beck – Vita nätter" "White Nights"	Kjell Sundvall	Rolf Börjlind	27 February 1998
White Nights is another name for a 2-3 day long rave where everyone dances but with amphetamine or ecstasy in their blood. The drugs are smuggled into the country hidden among medical equipment addressed to a Swedish hospital with trucks from Eastern Europe. Beck gets involved but not just for police reasons.
4	4	"Beck – Öga för öga" "Eye for an Eye"	Kjell Sundvall	Rolf Börjlind	27 March 1998
A series of murders is discovered around the country, seemingly completely unrelated but all with the same denominator: all the victims have had their eyes cut out after being killed.
5	5	"Beck – Pensionat Pärlan" "The Pearl Hotel"	Kjell Sundvall	Rolf Börjlind	8 April 1998
When the price of a passport and a ticket to Sweden is to smuggle in a small bottle of liquid metal taped to your body, the consequences can be very tragic.
6	6	"Beck – Monstret" "The Monster"	Harald Hamrell	Rolf Börjlind	20 May 1998
Bomb threat at a police station in Stockholm. The bomb squad's robot smashes the briefcase with the bomb. The briefcase contains an infant. Shocked by the cruelty, Beck's group tries to keep it all a secret. But the killer has other plans. The entire country's newspapers will soon receive an e-mail, where everything will be revealed about the child.
7	7	"Beck – The Money Man" "The Money Man"	Harald Hamrell	Rolf Börjlind	3 June 1998
A homosexual police officer has provided gangster Gavling with information from the National Police's archives. When he no longer wants to participate in disclosing information, he is murdered.
8	8	"Beck – Spår i mörker" "Trails in Darkness"	Morten Arnfred	Rolf Börjlind	31 October 1998
Beck is setting off on holiday with a colleague and girlfriend, Lena Klingström, when several gruesome murders in the Stockholm Metro force him to return. Without any type of motivation he is forced to lead the investigation. Four things connect the murders: they are all in the underground, they are all beheadings and the murderer has left a sign.

=== Series 2 (2001–2002) ===
No. overall	No. in season	Title	Directed by	Written by	Original release date
9	1	"Beck – Hämndens pris" "The Revenge"	Kjell Sundvall	Rolf Börjlind & Cilla Börjlind	27 June 2001
A police car pulls over near a van on a desolate highway where two young men are changing a flat tire. Two officers step out of the car and offer their help. Suddenly a third person gets out of the van. One of the officers reacts instantly when he recognises the man is a well-known criminal. Having been involved in a robbery at a military camp ten minutes before, the van is loaded with explosives and assault rifles. Hours later the two police officers are found shot dead in an execution style. Beck is assigned to the case and is offered all the resources he needs to solve the case. The hunt is complicated by the fact Larsson was a close friend of one of the officers murdered and he makes it clear he is ready to use any methods necessary to find the killer.
10	2	"Beck – Mannen utan ansikte" "The Man With no Face"	Harald Hamrell	Rolf Börjlind & Cilla Börjlind	7 November 2001
Two nocturnal dog walkers find the dead body of a third in the woods. His face has been cut off. Could the dead man's job as a burglar alarm salesman have had anything to do with his gruesome death?
11	3	"Beck – Kartellen" "The Cartel"	Kjell Sundvall	Rolf Börjlind & Cilla Börjlind	12 December 2001
When a restaurant owner is murdered, the police must investigate the criminal's involvement in the restaurant industry. Gunvald Larsson has to stay in the office because he walks on crutches after injuring his foot. Instead, it will be Martin Beck and his colleague Alice Levander who will investigate the case.
12	4	"Beck – Enslingen" "The Recluse"	Kjell Sundvall	Rolf Börjlind & Cilla Börjlind	16 January 2002
A body of a young naked Thai woman is found in Stockholm. At the same time, a lone elderly man is found murdered in a secluded cottage
13	5	"Beck – Okänd avsändare" "Sender Unknown"	Harald Hamrell	Rolf Börjlind & Cilla Börjlind	13 February 2002
An auditor is found shot in the long-term parking lot at Arlanda Airport. The man has neither a ticket nor luggage, but Martin Beck soon discovers that the murdered man had booked a one-way ticket to Malaysia.
14	6	"Beck – Annonsmannen" "The Ad Man"	Daniel Lind Lagerlöf	Rolf Börjlind & Cilla Börjlind	20 March 2002
A man rapes several women after meeting them via social media. Martin Beck, Gunvald Larsson and Alice Levander unravel the case, which turns out to be about revenge.
15	7	"Beck – Pojken i glaskulan" "The Boy in the Glass Bowl"	Daniel Lind Lagerlöf	Rolf Börjlind & Cilla Börjlind	10 April 2002
A woman is found dead in her home. In the house is her autistic son, with the murder weapon in his hand. But it will not be long before Martin Beck and his colleagues suspect that something is not right ...
16	8	"Beck – Sista vittnet" "Blind Profit"	Harald Hamrell	Rolf Börjlind & Cilla Börjlind	4 January 2002
In short order, the bodies of three Latvian prostitutes are found, all with their faces burned off with acid. Beck learns he has serious heart disease and meets a woman in a restaurant to whom he is strongly attracted.

=== Series 3 (2006–2007) ===
No. overall	No. in season	Title	Directed by	Written by	Original release date
17	1	"Beck – Skarpt läge" "The Scorpion"	Harald Hamrell	Rolf Börjlind & Cilla Börjlind	28 June 2006
An abused woman is feverishly sought by police for the murder of her ex-husband but is being hidden by abused woman-advocates. At the same time, Gunvald Larsson discovers a police report that his long-estranged sister has been abused. He confronts her with his knowledge, but she denies it.
18	2	"Beck – Flickan i jordkällaren" "The Unclaimed Girl"	Harald Hamrell	Rolf Börjlind & Cilla Börjlind	6 December 2006
The body of a little girl is discovered neatly tucked into a makeshift bed in a root cellar deep in the woods. With a plate of food beside her, she has starved to death. Shortly after, a reclusive farmer is found hanged, with a suicide note confessing to the crime. Lena Klingström reappears, looking for a job.
19	3	"Beck – Gamen" "The Vulture"	Kjell Sundvall	Rolf Börjlind & Cilla Börjlind	17 January 2007
Former sports minister John Vedén disappears and it quickly becomes apparent that his disappearance is connected to his gambling addiction.
20	4	"Beck – Advokaten" "The Lawyer"	Kjell Sundvall	Rolf Börjlind & Cilla Börjlind	21 February 2007
Known lawyer Patrik Hansson is found brutally murdered in his home. The murder initially looks like an open and shut case - Hansson had been involved in a case where a company has been indicted for lying about the circumstances surrounding a serious environmental crime. When Beck and Klingström go through Hansson's office, they find evidence that casts new light on the investigation - but who pulled the strings, and why? To find the solution, they have to dig further into Hansson's past and find a picture that is even more complicated than they thought.
21	5	"Beck – Den japanska shungamålningen" "The Japanese Shunga Painting"	Kjell Sundvall	Rolf Börjlind & Cilla Börjlind	5 June 2007
Martin Beck and Hans Sperling, German detective and Beck's friend who is visiting Stockholm for an art auction, discover in Sperling's hotel the dead body of an art agent who outbid Sperling for a Japanese shunga erotic print. She has been murdered and the crime scene arranged to resemble Chagall's painting The Woman and the Roses. Two Chagall prints and the shunga print are missing from her room. Soon three more bodies are found, arranged to resemble the shunga print. Who is constructing these gruesome reproductions, and why?
22	6	"Beck – Den svaga länken" "The Weak Link"	Harald Hamrell	Rolf Börjlind & Cilla Börjlind	23 March 2007
Beck investigates a series of rapes and murders that occur at night in a public park.
23	7	"Beck – Det tysta skriket" "The Silent Scream"	Harald Hamrell	Rolf Börjlind & Cilla Börjlind	19 September 2007
Two young girls are killed by a train. Evidence at the scene suggests they were dragged onto the tracks by a third person.
24	8	"Beck – I Guds namn" "In the Name of God"	Kjell Sundvall	Rolf Börjlind & Cilla Börjlind	10 October 2007
A paparazzo is beaten to death. While the homicide team goes through his photographs, Police Chief Margareta Oberg conceals two photos from the rest of the team. She is then killed in her home. What was in the photographs that could have led to her death?

=== Specials (2009–2010) ===
No. overall	No. in season	Title	Directed by	Written by	Original release date
25	S1	"Beck – I stormens öga" "The Eye of the Storm"	Harald Hamrell	Rolf Börjlind & Cilla Börjlind	26 August 2009
Beck and his colleagues link the discovery of a burned female body to the hunt for a group of environmentalists engaged in terrorism across borders. Larsson knew the woman believed to have been murdered and is suspected by SÄPO (Swedish Security Services) of involvement. While the terrorists plan an attack that could have dire consequences, Larsson is taken off the case.
26	S2	"Beck – Levande begravd" "Buried Alive"	Harald Hamrell	Rolf Börjlind & Cilla Börjlind	22 June 2010
In a playground in a park, a child finds a buried wooden box, and police discover that it contains the body of a famous and well-respected prosecutor. Martin Beck and his police team initially suspect the criminal leader of a motorcycle gang of the attack, but they have to re-evaluate the case once the gang leader is found murdered, his corpse in a similar wooden box. Soon, more wooden boxes are found and the police realise that they are part of a cat and mouse game with a serial killer. The investigation soon shows that there is a connection between the victims in the form of an event nine years ago, and police think that they know the identity of the killer; but what Martin Beck does not suspect is that his own life is at stake too, as the real murderer has chosen him as the next victim.

=== Series 4 (2015) ===
No. overall	No. in season	Title	Directed by	Written by	Original release date
27	1	"Beck – Rum 302" "Room 302"	Mårten Klingberg	Mikael Syrén	1 January 2015
A young woman is found strangled in a hotel room. The investigation leads Beck and Gunvald towards Stureplan, Stockholm's nightlife and its dark sides.
28	2	"Beck – Familjen" "The Family"	Mårten Klingberg	Mårten Klingberg	10 January 2015
A famous gangster is shot to death right in front of his family. Shortly afterwards, a woman is brutally run over in a parking lot. Is there a connection between the cases?
29	3	"Beck – Invasionen" "Invasion"	Stephan Apelgren	Daniel Karlsson	21 March 2015
The bodies of two men are found and despite diligent attempts, one cannot be identified. When another man then takes his life, the investigation picks up speed and the clues seem to lead to an Islamist terrorist cell.
30	4	"Beck – Sjukhusmorden" "The Hospital Murders"	Stephan Apelgren	Antonia Pyk	28 March 2015
The son of a recently deceased ALS (Amyotrophic Lateral Sclerosis) patient accuses his mother's doctor of causing her death. Shortly afterwards, the doctor falls to his death from the hospital's roof. What at first is believed to be a suicide quickly turns out to be a murder.

=== Series 5 (2016) ===
No. overall	No. in season	Title	Directed by	Written by	Original release date
31	1	"Beck – Gunvald" "Gunvald"	Mårten Klingberg	Mikael Syrén	1 January 2016
A journalist is beaten to death in his home. At the crime scene, clues lead the police to a known collector who has previously been punished. The colleague of the murdered man says that the man was engaged in investigative journalism and was currently working on a book about a known criminal and that he was repeatedly threatened both for his ethnic background and his political stance.
32	2	"Beck – Steinar" "Steinar"	Mårten Klingberg	Josefin Johansson	6 February 2016
An unidentified body is found in the remains of a burnt-out caravan. Arson is suspected and the Beck group is involved. Martin Beck's chief Klas Fredén has recruited the Norwegian police Steinar Hovland to the group. He quickly turns out to be Gunvald's exact opposite, which both facilitates and complicates the collaboration with Martin.
33	3	"Beck – Vid vägs ände" "End of the Road"	Jörgen Bergmark	Stefan Thunberg	5 March 2016
A former police officer and his family fall victim to a brutal triple murder. During the crime scene investigation, weapons are found that link the man to organised crime. The findings significantly increase the drama in the investigation and the questions pile up. Why did the man have these weapons and are there colleagues left in service who know anything?
34	4	"Beck – Sista dagen" "The Last Day"	Jörgen Bergmark	Antonia Pyk	2 April 2016
Two traffic officers attempt to stop a car that is driving too fast. When the car stops, the driver gets out and shoots one of the officers dead. There is not much to go on at the beginning, but with the help of CCTV cameras, the car soon is identified. Beck and the team storm into the apartment of the car owner, where they unexpectedly find him also shot dead. As Beck begins the hunt for the murderer anew, murderer takes steps towards carrying out his next deadly plan of revenge.

=== Series 6 (2018) ===
No. overall	No. in season	Title	Directed by	Written by	Original release date	UK air date
35	1	"Beck – Ditt eget blod" "Flesh and Blood"	Mårten Klingberg	Mårten Klingberg	1 January 2018	3 November 2018
Beck, now retired, returns to help SÄPO track down a Syrian immigrant who has defected to ISIS. Meanwhile, Steinar and the team investigate the disappearance of a sixteen-year-old girl from Stockholm city centre, but the two cases collide when the girl's boyfriend turns out to be the brother of the man Beck is trying to track down.
36	2	"Beck – Den tunna isen" "Thin Ice"	Mårten Klingberg	Katarina Ewers	3 February 2018	10 November 2018
The murder of an ice hockey coach, which appears initially to be an open-and-shut case, is complicated by a targeted campaign of attacks against a group of refugees living at a nearby hostel. Meanwhile, Steinar is devastated to learn that he has been passed over for the position of permanent team leader in favour of Alex.
37	3	"Beck – Utan uppsåt" "Without Intent"	Jörgen Bergmark	Wilhelm Behrman	3 March 2018	17 November 2018
A young girl arrives home from school to find her mother lying at the bottom of the stairs, having seemingly fallen to her death - but signs of a struggle in the family home suggest that her death may in fact be murder. Meanwhile, Alex arrives for her first day as team leader, and Steinar struggles to cope with the shift of power.
38	4	"Beck – Djävulens advokat" "The Devil's Advocate"	Jörgen Bergmark	Johan Bogaeus	7 April 2018	24 November 2018
The murder of a restaurant owner who is gunned down in front of a diner full of customers has unexpected repercussions for Alex, whose brother, Paul, represented two men expected of involvement in the killing. Meanwhile, Steinar, amidst tension with Alex and the breakdown of his marriage, accepts the offer of a transfer from Klas.

=== Series 7 (2020–2021) ===
No. overall	No. in season	Title	Directed by	Written by	Original release date	UK air date
39	1	"Beck – Undercover" "Undercover"	Pontus Klänge	Johan Bogaeus	6 November 2020	3 July 2021
A young boy has been found murdered, and the Beck group's investigation leads them to a narcotics network.
40	2	"Beck – Utom rimligt tvivel" "Beyond Reasonable Doubt"	Pontus Klänge	Veronica Zacco	4 December 2020	10 July 2021
During a spontaneous intervention, a macabre find is made in the trunk of a car. It will be Alex's task to lead the investigation of a cruel murder mystery, all the while the Beck group is put under severe pressure both internally and externally.
41	3	"Beck – Döden i Samarra" "Death in Samarra"	Lisa Ohlin	Fredrik Agetoft	1 January 2021	17 July 2021
A candidate for the Nobel Peace Prize is brutally stabbed to death in central Stockholm just after a meeting with two lawyers from the International Criminal Court in The Hague.
42	4	"Beck – Den förlorade sonen" "The Lost Son"	Lisa Ohlin	Stefan Thunberg	5 February 2021	24 July 2021
A jawbone is found in the middle of the forest. When the rest of the body is found, it turns out that it has just recently been moved and belongs to Viktor Eklund, who has been missing for five years.

=== Series 8 (2021–2022) ===
No. overall	No. in season	Title	Directed by	Written by	Original release date	UK air date
43	1	"Beck – Ett nytt liv" "Haunted by the Past "	Pontus Klänge	Peter Arrhenius	25 December 2021	7 May 2022
After three months of rehabilitation, Martin Beck is back on duty. His group is thrown into a case where the body of a notorious Danish professional criminal is found in the water at Liljeholmen.
44	2	"Beck – Rage Room" "Rage Room "	Pontus Klänge	Johan Bogaeus	January 21, 2022	14 May 2022
A murder in a wooded area and a man who died suddenly in a heart attack after being awakened in the middle of the night by a masked burglar. The Beck group is facing another tough case where internal tensions and loyalties are being put to the test.
45	3	"Beck – 58 minuter" "58 Minutes "	Lisa Ohlin	Anna Platt	February 18, 2022	21 May 2022
When Alex Beijer participates in a TV morning show which develops into a nightmare when a hostage situation arises in the TV studio, she needs the support of the rest of the group to find a solution.
46	4	"Beck – Den gråtande polisen" "The Crying Cop "	Lisa Ohlin	Fredrik Agetoft	March 18, 2022	28 May 2022
After a 14-year-old boy is shot by police, an anti-violence demonstration gets out of hand. The police are forced to take further blame. A massacre takes place on a bus near the Police Academy. A tip from Martin's police cadet grandson Vilhelm leads the Beck group to a long-time anti-police activist. The plot borrows its central idea from The Laughing Policeman (1968), one of the original novels.

=== Series 9 (2022–2024) ===
In February 2022, the shooting of four Beck films began in Stockholm. (Beck 47–50)

No. overall	No. in season	Title	Directed by	Written by	Original release date	UK air date
47	1	"Beck – Dödsfällan (The Death Trap)"	Niklas Ohlson	Peter Arrhenius	25 December 2022	1 July 2023
Police trainee Vilhelm Beck, Martin's grandson, is out on an internship with his supervisor. During a routine burglary case, he finds a dead 17-year-old boy at the scene of the crime. It immediately becomes a case for Alex and the others in the Beck group.
48	2	"Beck – Quid Pro Quo"	Dennis Magnusson	Pontus Klänge	17 March 2023	8 July 2023
Steinar Hovland and Josef are assigned to investigate a death at a flea market - where SÄPO shows an unusual interest.
49	3	"Beck – Inferno"	Pontus Klänge	Annika Sandahl	8 December 2023	15 July 2023
Josef is suspended, pending an investigation of his alleged assault of a SÄPO agent. But he is not idle for long. Meanwhile, the Beck group investigates a shooting.
50	4	"Beck – Deadlock"	Niklas Ohlson	Johan Bogaeus	9 February 2024	22 July 2023
The Beck group is called out to investigate the brutal murder of a man in his own apartment. Soon after, Beck's grandson Vilhelm is taken hostage.

=== Series 10 (2024–2025) ===
In February 2024 it was announced that season 10 would include 2 new movies (Beck 51–52) and will be released during later part of 2024 (51) and in 2025 (52).

No. overall	No. in season	Title	Directed by	Written by	Original release date	UK air date
51	1	"Beck – Vilhelm"	Per Hanefjord	Annika Sandahl	6 December 2024	9 August 2025
A delivery gone wrong turns deadly in a Stockholm apartment. As Vilhelm Beck's team responds, his past trauma resurfaces. His personal probe into the execution-style killing leads to unexpected connections with the Beck group.
52	2	"Beck – Den osynlige mannen" "The Invisible Man"	Per Hanefjord	Fredrik Agetoft; Peter Arrenius	21 June 2025	9 August 2025
After a brutal murder, Alex teams up with suspended Vilhelm and Josef. The victim has ties to Howl, a digital university studying men's roles. The case connects to the "Balcony Man" investigation, bringing Beck back.

=== Series 11 (2025–2026) ===
In September 2024 it was announced that season 11 would include two new movies (Beck 53–54), which would be produced during 2025. The release dates were announced in the autumn of 2025; Ashes to Ashes on the 5th of December 2025 and In the shadows on the 20th of March 2026.

No. overall	No. in season	Title	Directed by	Written by	Original release date
53	1	"Beck – Ur Askan" "Ashes to Ashes"	Lisa Farzaneh	Annika Sandahl; Fredrik Agetoft	5 December 2025
A pastor is found burned to death in Jericho Parish Church. The investigation turns complicated after finding out that the church's other pastor is a childhood friend of Alex's, making the case personal. Alex is forced to deal with a conflict between her professional responsibilities and her past.
54	2	"I skuggorna" "In the shadows"	Lisa Farzaneh	Fredrik Agetoft	20 March 2026
A shooting in a Stockholm suburb leads the police to a criminal gang, whose members are located a short distance from the crime scene. It turns out that they may have been transported there by a masked person with unknown motives. A cross-border police operation is launched to both arrest the gang leader and stop the unknown perpetrator before the next attack.

=== Series 12 (2026–2027) ===
At the beginning of 2026, two further movies were announced for the 12 series, The filming was scheduled to start in the spring of 2026. Beck 55 will be released on the 27th of november 2026.

No. overall	No. in season	Title	Directed by	Written by	Original release date
55	1	"Syndens lön" "The Wages of Sin"	Per Hanefjord	Peter Arrhenius	27 November 2026
A young man with ties to the criminal underworld is found shot dead. The investigation quickly points toward a criminal family being targeted in a bloody act of revenge, but it soon becomes apparent that the threat is coming from a completely unexpected direction
56	2	TBA	TBA	TBA	TBA

=== Series 13 (2027–TBD) ===
In september of 2026, two further movies were announced for the 13 series, The filming was scheduled to start in the spring of 2027.

No. overall	No. in season	Title	Directed by	Written by	Original release date
57	1	TBA	TBA	TBA	TBA
58	2	TBA	TBA	TBA	TBA

=== Home Video ===
MHZ Choice DVD released Beck on DVD in the U.S.A.

- Volume 01 = episodes # 1,2,3
- Volume 02 = episodes # 4,5,6
- Volume 03 = episodes # 7,8,9
- Volume 04 = episodes # 10,11,12
- Volume 05 = episodes # 13,14,15
- Volume 06 = episodes # 16,17,18
- Volume 07 = episodes # 19,20,21
- Volume 08 = episodes # 22,23,24
- Volume 09 = episodes # 25,26,27
- Volume 10 = episodes # 28,29,30,31
- Volume 11 = episodes # 32,33,34
- Volume 12 = episodes # 35,36,37,38

MHZ Choice Network streams seasons 1 through 8 in the U.S.A. Season 9 will begin streaming on May 21, 2024.
