= Bo Höglund =

Swedish actor (born 1948)

Bo Sven Gunnar Höglund (born 27 May 1948 in Huddinge, Stockholm County) is a Swedish actor.

Höglund has been employed at Östgötateatern in Norrköping and Linköping since 1983. He has appeared in productions such as Kyrkbröllop, Hämndaria, Don Juan, Dreyfus, Amadeus and The Wizard of Oz. He has toured with the National Swedish Touring Theatre and acted in TV shows including Fiendens fiende, Nya tider, c/o Segemyhr and Rederiet. For four seasons he worked with Nils Poppe at Fredriksdalsteatern in Helsingborg. Höglund is best known for his role as Mats the waiter in the Martin Beck series.

== Selected filmography ==
- Beck – Den svaga länken (2007)
- Beck – Enslingen (2002)
- Beck – Sista vittnet (2002)
- Beck – Kartellen (2002)
- 2002 – Nya tider
- 2001 – Skilda världar
- 1998 – Rederiet
- Beck – The Money Man (1998)
- Beck – Monstret (1998)
- Beck – Vita nätter (1998)
- Beck – Öga för öga (1998)
- Beck – Pensionat Pärlan (1997)
- Beck – Mannen med ikonerna (1997)
- Beck – Lockpojken (1997)
- 1994 – Bröderna Östermans huskors
- 1991 – Harry Lund lägger näsan i blöt!
- 1990 – Fiendens fiende
- 1989 – Offren
- 1983 & 1991 - Blomman från Hawaii (Theatre)
