= Chock (TV series) =

1997 Swedish TV series

- Directed by: Mikael Håfström; Daniel Bergman; Ulf Malmros
- Presented by: Ernst-Hugo Järegård
- Starring: Kjell Bergqvist; Jan Mybrand; Rebecka Hemse; Thomas Bo Larsen; Catharina Alinder; Per Morberg; Stefan Sauk
- Country of origin: Sweden
- Original language: Swedish

Chock is a Swedish horror television series that was broadcast in 1997. It was made in the style of horror shows like Tales from the Crypt.

Each episode was presented by the Swedish cult actor and horror host Ernst-Hugo Järegård. Episodes were directed by Mikael Håfström, Daniel Bergman and Ulf Malmros.

== Episodes ==
=== 1. The Angel of Death ===
All the patients at a certain room in a hospital die from what appear to be natural causes.

=== 2. Meat ===
A psychopathic man becomes obsessed with watching a wealthy and obese woman eat. Meanwhile, the woman's husband is planning on murdering her. The man's old mother is equally obese and unable to move because of her age. She also seems unable to speak. The man secretly films the woman eating with a home camera, saving a large number of tapes of her eating different meals. One night, the husband is going out to a meeting and puts poison into the woman's juice. After he leaves, the man enters the house and kills the woman. In the episode's gruesome finale, the man stocks up the woman's flesh in his fridge, then serves some of it to his mother who happily eats it unaware of the dish's origin. The man then prepares a meal for two from the woman's meat and while having one for himself serves the other to a television set showing the woman eat. He then pretends he is having dinner with the woman, before he and his mother succumb to the poison still being in the woman's system at the time of her death.

=== 3. Forbidden Fruit ===
A girl (Rebecka Hemse) has a strange fear of bananas. She believes them to be infested with snake eggs that will hatch inside her. A doctor manages to treat her against the fear and she starts eat bananas. In a chilling twist she feels sick and is taken to the hospital and it turns out a snake actually has hatched inside her. The final shot shows a snake lying by her bed, indicating that she had given birth to it.

=== 4. The Hitchhiking Girl ===
Two Danes on vacation in Sweden come across a hysterical girl.

=== 5. High Beam ===
A woman is being chased through the countryside by a truck.

=== 6. When the Phone Rings... ===
A man (Kjell Bergqvist) is in desperate need of money and takes a job as a babysitter for the daughter of a wealthy couple. He is terrorized by the daughter and a mysterious caller, in the end becoming so desperate that he phones the man to whom he is in heavy debt for help.

=== 7. Till Death Do Us Part ===
A prisoner is released from prison and goes after his wife, who did not visit him during his imprisonment.

=== 8. Honor ===
A robber is trying to pull off a gamble that will leave her with all the money.

== Cast ==
- Ernst-Hugo Järegård - Ghastly Man (presenter)

=== Main characters ===
- Kjell Bergqvist - Dr. Leif Tegnell / Mårten
- Jan Mybrand - The Son
- Rebecka Hemse - Julia
- Thomas Bo Larsen - Robert
- Catharina Alinder - Driver
- Per Morberg - Harry
- Stefan Sauk - Zac

=== Supporting cast ===
- Amanda Ooms
- Claes Ljungmark - Dr. Rose
- Jasmine Heikura - Ella
- Vanna Rosenberg - Aina K.
- Peter Palmér - Doctor
- Zelda Rubinstein - Mom
- Johan Rabaeus - Ulf Jansson
- Per Svensson - Police
- Thomas Hellberg - Appelkvist
- Karin Hagås - Sofie
- Paul Fried - Killer
- Jacqueline Ramel - Robber
- Timothy Earle - Tom
