= Beck – Vita nätter =

1998 Swedish television film

- Swedish DVD cover
- Written by: Rolf Börjlind
- Directed by: Kjell Sundvall
- Starring: Peter Haber; Mikael Persbrandt; Stina Rautelin
- Country of origin: Sweden
- Original language: Swedish

Production
- Producers: Lars Blomgren; Thomas Lydholm
- Running time: 84 minutes

Original release
- Release: 1998

Beck – Vita nätter (English: Beck – White Nights) is a 1998 Swedish police film about Martin Beck, directed by Kjell Sundvall.

== Cast ==
- Peter Haber as Martin Beck
- Mikael Persbrandt as Gunvald Larsson
- Stina Rautelin as Lena Klingström
- Per Morberg as Joakim Wersén
- Ingvar Hirdwall as Martin Beck's neighbour
- Rebecka Hemse as Inger (Martin Beck's daughter)
- Fredrik Ultvedt as Jens Loftsgård
- Michael Nyqvist as John Banck
- Anna Ulrica Ericsson as Yvonne Jäder
- Peter Hüttner as Oljelund
- Bo Höglund as Mats (the waiter)
- Emil Forselius as Mikael Sjögren (Martin Beck's son)
- Dubrilla Ekerlund as Nina (Mikael's girlfriend)
- Katarina Ewerlöf as Jeanette Bolin
- Lennart Hjulström as Lennart Gavling
- Torsten Wahlund as Bengt "Ugglan" Hakdahl
- Lennart R. Svensson as the fieldworker
- Douglas Johansson as the man from LIC
- Jonas Uddenmyr as Anders Johansson
- Tytte Johnsson as Agneta (Mikael's mother)
