= Beck – Mannen med ikonerna =

1997 Swedish television film

- Swedish DVD-cover
- Written by: Rolf Börjlind
- Directed by: Pelle Seth
- Starring: Peter Haber; Mikael Persbrandt; Figge Norling; Stina Rautelin
- Country of origin: Sweden
- Original language: Swedish

Production
- Producers: Lars Blomgren; Thomas Lydholm
- Running time: 91 min

Original release
- Release: 1997

Beck – Mannen med ikonerna (English: Beck – The Man with the Icons) is a 1997 film about the Swedish police detective Martin Beck directed by Pelle Seth.

== Cast ==
- Peter Haber as Martin Beck
- Mikael Persbrandt as Gunvald Larsson
- Figge Norling as Benny Skacke
- Stina Rautelin as Lena Klingström
- Per Morberg as Joakim Wersén
- Åke Lundqvist as Oleg Vassiljev, "Mannen med ikonerna"
- Ingvar Hirdwall as Martin Beck's neighbour
- Rebecka Hemse as Inger (Martin Beck's daughter)
- Fredrik Ultvedt as Jens Loftsgård
- Michael Nyqvist as John Banck
- Anna Ulrica Ericsson as Yvonne Jäder
- Peter Hüttner as Oljelund
- Bo Höglund as Mats (the waiter)
- Jörgen Andersson as a police from the Swedish Security Service (SÄPO)
- Dan Johansson as a police from SÄPO
- Lilian Johansson as Rosa Andrén
- Vladimir Dikanski as Jurij Gulkov
- Paul Fried as Arne Enberg
- Michael Kallaanvaara as Pekka
