= Beck – Spår i mörker =

1997 television film

- Swedish DVD-cover
- Written by: Rolf Börjlind
- Directed by: Morten Arnfred
- Starring: Peter Haber; Mikael Persbrandt; Stina Rautelin; Cecilia Häll; Carlo Schmidt
- Music by: Ulf Dageby
- Countries of origin: Sweden; Germany; Denmark; Norway
- Original language: Swedish

Production
- Producers: Lars Blomgren; Thomas Lydholm
- Cinematography: Eric Kress
- Running time: 90 min (Theater); 86 min (TV/VHS); 85 min (DVD)
- Production company: Victoria Film A/S

Original release
- Release: 31 October 1997

Beck – Spår i mörker (Beck - Trails in Darkness) is a 1997 film about the Swedish police detective Martin Beck directed by Morten Arnfred. It is the eighth film about Martin Beck with Peter Haber as Martin Beck and Mikael Persbrandt as Gunvald Larsson.

== Plot ==
Martin Beck is on his way to a vacation with his colleague and girlfriend Lena Klingström when several gruesome murders in the Stockholm Metro force him to return. Without any kind of motivation, he is forced to lead the investigation of the strange murders. There are four things connecting the murders: they are all in the underground, they are all decapitations, and a sign is left by the murderer/murderers. This sign is "X-(", which means "death" in 1337. The last connecting thing is that before every murder, all lights have been turned off (note that this was faked and in reality impossible).

As the investigation progresses it becomes clear that Erik Lindgren, a man who works in the underground, has some kind of connection to the murderers. Once found, he explains that the murderers are youngsters that mostly inhabit the tunnels (actually a closed-down factory connected to the tunnels in the outskirts of the city), playing action games (more specifically, "Final Doom") against "other fools around the globe". He suspects that his sister, Annika is part of the gang, and explains how he's tried to "pull her out of the shit". The group has even written a letter to him stating that "You talk to the cops and Kickfoot [Annika] dies". When Erik guides Beck to the entrance of the hideout of the gang, they are ambushed by the murderers, but the Swedish task force arrives just in time to save Beck, though too late for Erik.

Eventually, Beck finds Annika, who initially denies any knowledge about the murders; however, when Beck describes to Annika how much Erik loved her and that he was murdered by the gang, she suddenly breaks down and says that he brought it on himself by trying to interfere with her business, although she did not want her peers to kill him. She eventually proceeds to describe the whole truth: the group assumes their Final Doom characters in real life and plays the game by killing people in the underground in order to obtain so-called frags and thereby advance to new levels. This activity is not limited to Sweden, but shared with people around the world engaging in similar murders. Annika was not part of the actual killings, however, instead being in charge of technical areas.

Beck manages to convince Annika to take Beck and the task force to the hideout, which is empty save for a single little boy Beck and Gunvald had met earlier, who is playing Final Doom. He tells Annika that the others are out on a raid. By reading text files on one of the computers, Annika discovers that they are raiding the station underneath Odenplan (in reality this was filmed at St Eriksplan, which is one station west of Odenplan). Beck and the task force arrive just in time to arrest the murderers, who are armed with machetes and night vision goggles. Stefan, the leader, attempts to kill Annika upon finding out that she betrayed them, but Gunvald shoots him in the leg. When Beck arrives to the street, an American journalist asks him if there is a connection to some similar murders in New York (which is heavily implied as both Erik and Annika explained that the killings were taking place internationally) and he tells Klingström that he may not be able to go on the planned vacation, because he may have to go to New York and assist with the investigation.

== Cast ==
- Peter Haber as Martin Beck
- Mikael Persbrandt as Gunvald Larsson
- Stina Rautelin as Lena Klingström
- Cecilia Häll as Annika Lindgren
- Carlo Schmidt as Erik Lindgren
- Per Morberg as Joakim Wersén
- Kasper Lindström as Jens (a kid)
- Ingvar Hirdwall as Martin Beck's neighbour
- Rebecka Hemse as Inger (Martin Beck's daughter)
- Fredrik Ultvedt as Jens Loftsgård
- Michael Nyqvist as John Banck
- Lasse Lindroth as Peter (Inger's boyfriend)
- Staffan Göthe as Henrik Magnusson
- Margareta Niss as Elisabeth Ernström
- Ulf Eklund as Bengt Nihlfors
- Boman Oscarsson as a journalist
- Daniel Larsson as Stefan

== Production ==
All the footage from "Final Doom" is taken from modified parts of Marathon 2: Durandal by Bungie.

== Release and reception ==
The premier in Sweden was on 31 October 1997. It was released on VHS in February 1998 and on DVD 13 November 2002. The film had 1,595,000 viewers in Sweden when it was broadcast on TV4 in 2002.
