= Peter Hüttner =

Swedish actor and writer (born 1945)

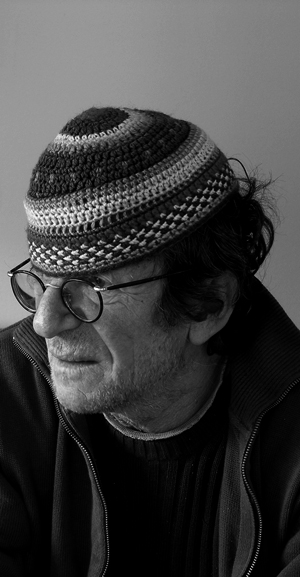
- Born: 10 December 1945 (age 80); Gothenburg, Sweden
- Occupation: Actor
- Years active: 1974–present

Peter Hüttner (born 10 December 1945) is a Swedish actor and writer.

Hüttner began his theatrical career at Folkteatern in Gothenburg 1968 and was subsequently employed on Atelierteatern. He is trained at the stage school in Malmö 1969–73. He has worked on Helsingborg City Theatre, Stockholm City Theatre, Gothenburg City Theatre, National Swedish Touring Theatre and Folkteatern. Hüttner is best known for his role as Oljelund in the films about the police Martin Beck.

== Filmography ==
- Beck – Levande begravd (2010)
- Beck – I Guds namn (2007)
- Beck – Det tysta skriket (2007)
- Beck – Den svaga länken (2007)
- Beck – Den japanska shungamålningen (2007)
- Beck – Gamen (2007)
- Beck – Advokaten (2006)
- Beck – Flickan i jordkällaren (2006)
- Beck – Skarpt läge (2006)
- Beck – Sista vittnet (2002)
- Beck – Pojken i glaskulan (2002)
- Beck – Annonsmannen (2002)
- Beck – Okänd avsändare (2002)
- Beck – Enslingen (2002)
- Beck – Kartellen (2002)
- Beck – Mannen utan ansikte (2001)
- Beck – Hämndens pris (2001)
- Hur som helst är han djävligt död (2000)
- Beck – Spår i mörker (1998)
- Beck – The Money Man (1998)
- Beck – Monstret (1998)
- Beck – Öga för öga (1998)
- Beck – Vita nätter (1998)
- Beck – Pensionat Pärlan (1997)
- Beck – Mannen med ikonerna (1997)
- Beck – Lockpojken (1997)
- 1995 – Vita lögner
- Pariserhjulet (1993)
- Den stora badardagen (1991)
- 1990 – Apelsinmannen
- 1988 – Varuhuset
- 1987 – Undanflykten
- Morrhår och ärtor (1986)
- 1985 – Anden i flaskan
- Varning för Jönssonligan (1981)
- En kärleks sommar (1979)
- 1978 – Bevisbördan
- The Tempest (1974)
