= Paul Fried =

Paul Fried may refer to:

- Paul Fried (musician), American musician, bass player for band Audiovent
- Paul Fried (actor) (born 1958), Swedish actor and former writer
