= Beck: The Eye of the Storm =

- Written by: Cecilia Börjlind; Rolf Börjlind
- Directed by: Harald Hamrell
- Starring: Peter Haber; Mikael Persbrandt
- Country of origin: Sweden
- Original language: Swedish

Production
- Producer: Lars Blomgren

Original release
- Release: 26 August 2009

Beck: The Eye of the Storm (Swedish: Beck – I stormens öga) is a 2009 film about the Swedish police detective Martin Beck, directed by Harald Hamrell. It is the 25th film in the series of chief inspector Martin Beck with Peter Haber in the role of Beck and Mikael Persbrandt as Gunvald Larsson. The producer is Lars Blomgren and production company is Filmlance.

== Plot ==
Martin Beck and his colleagues are linked by the discovery of a burned female body to the hunt for a group of environmentalists engaged in terrorism across borders. Gunvald Larsson knew the woman believed to have been murdered and is suspected by SÄPO (Swedish Security Services) of involvement. Whilst the terrorists plan an attack that could have dire consequences officially Gunvald is off the case.

== Cast ==
- Peter Haber as Martin Beck
- Mikael Persbrandt as Gunvald Larsson
- Måns Nathanaelson as Oskar Bergman
- Ingvar Hirdwall as Martin Beck's neighbour
- Sven Ahlström as Tore Wiman
- Ann-Sofie Rase as Anita Åstrand
- Kirsti Torhaug as Kim Reeshaug
- Christoffer Hedén as Tom Reeshaug
- Daniel Götschenhielm as Lars Behger
- Stephen Rappaport
- Daniel Goldmann
- Suzanna Dilber
- Johannes Alfvén
- Erik Johansson
- Tobias Aspelin
- Marianne Sand Näslund
- Leila Haji as Merlina
