= Beck (film) =

- Swedish DVD-cover
- Written by: Rolf Börjlind
- Directed by: Pelle Seth
- Starring: Peter Haber; Mikael Persbrandt; Figge Norling; Stina Rautelin
- Country of origin: Sweden
- Original language: Swedish

Production
- Producers: Lars Blomgren; Thomas Lydholm
- Running time: 94 min

Original release
- Release: 27 June 1997

Beck, later called Beck – Lockpojken, is a 1997 film about the Swedish police detective Martin Beck directed by Pelle Seth and written by Rolf Börjlind.

== Cast ==
- Peter Haber as Martin Beck
- Mikael Persbrandt as Gunvald Larsson
- Figge Norling as Benny Skacke
- Stina Rautelin as Lena Klingström
- Per Morberg as Joakim Wersén
- Niklas Falk as judge Lagerfeldt
- Ingvar Hirdwall as Martin Beck's neighbour
- Rebecka Hemse as Inger (Martin Beck's daughter)
- Fredrik Ultvedt as Jens Loftsgård
- Mikael Nyqvist as John Banck
- Anna Ulrica Ericsson as Yvonne Jäder
- Peter Hüttner as Oljelund
- Bo Höglund as Mats (the waiter)
- Stefan Roos as Keith Karlsson
- Oskar Löfkvist as Aron
- Lamin Touray as Nicklas
- Roderyk Mundenius as Paaren
- Mina Azarian as Ino (Paaren's mother)
