= Fredrik Ultvedt =

Swedish actor (born 1961)

Fredrik Johannes Ultvedt (born 9 April 1961 in Stockholm) is a Swedish actor, best known for his role as Jens Loftegård in the Beck series.

== Filmography ==
As actor:

- Honongsvargar (1990)
- Storstad (1990)
- Tre terminer (1991 - TV series)
- Snoken (1993 - TV series)
- NileCity 105,6 (1993 - TV series)
- Percy tårar (1996 - TV series)
- Beck – Lockpojken (1997)
- Beck – Mannen med ikonerna (1997)
- Beck – Pensionat Pärlan (1997)
- Beck – Spår i mörker (1997)
- Selma & Johanna – en roadmovie (1997)
- Beck – The Money Man (1998)
- Beck – Monstret (1998)
- Beck – Vita nätter (1998)
- Beck – Öga för öga (1998)
- OP7 (1998 TV series)
- Tre Kronor (1999 TV series)
- Det grovmaskiga nätet (2000)

As director:

- Vänner och fiender (1996 - TV series)
