= Mats Rudal =

Swedish actor (born 1963)

Mats Ola Rudal (born 28 February 1963 in Östersund, Sweden) is a Swedish actor and policeman.

== Selected filmography ==
- 1997 - Snoken (TV)
- 1997 - Skilda världar (TV)
- 1999 - Sjön
- 2002 - Cleo
- 2002 - Beck – Kartellen
- 2003 - Kvarteret Skatan (TV)
- 2005 - Kommissionen (TV)
- 2005 - Kvalster (TV)
- 2006 - Kronprinsessan (TV)
- 2006 - Wallander – Luftslottet
- 2007 - Pyramiden
- 2007 - Ett gott parti (TV)
- 2008 - Livet i Fagervik (TV)
- 2008 - Oskyldigt dömd (TV)
