= Lasse Lindroth =

Swedish comedian (1972–1999)

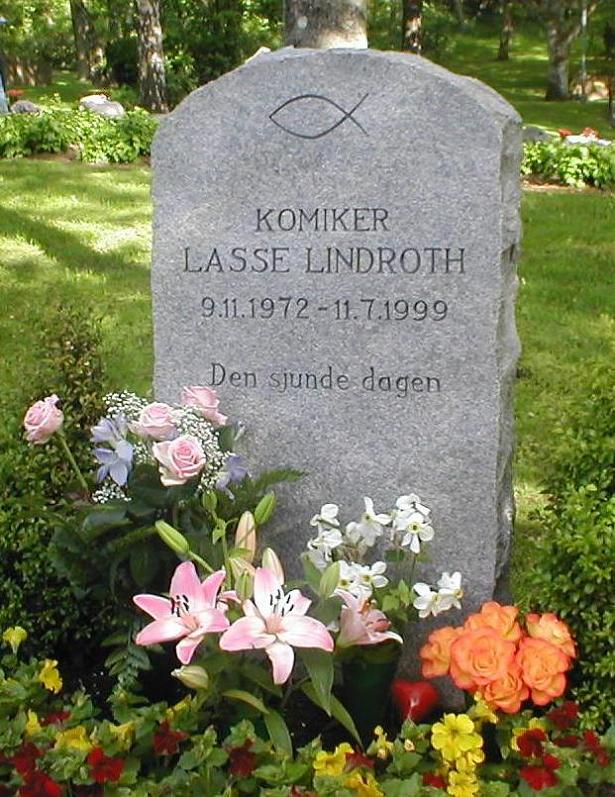
- The grave of Lasse Lindroth in Varberg
- Born: Cambiz Fachericia; 9 November 1972; Teheran, Iran
- Died: 11 July 1999 (aged 26); Uddevalla, Sweden
- Occupations: Comedian; writer; actor
- Years active: 1994–1999
- Spouse: Emma Lindroth Steinwall

Lars Erik Oliver "Lasse" Lindroth (born Cambiz Fachericia; 9 November 1972 – 11 July 1999) was an Iranian-Swedish comedian, actor and writer.

Lindroth was born in Teheran, Iran, as Cambiz Fachericia, and was adopted by a Swedish family from Täby around the age of six months.

He became popular in Sweden as a comedian in the mid-1990s, under the stage name Ali Hussein. From there he went on to also write books and play parts in films and on TV. For example, he played in the TV series Sjukan, which was a Swedish version of British sitcom Only When I Laugh.

His Iranian origin allowed him to play on the prejudices about immigrants from different countries, while also making jokes about racists of all sorts. This made him unpopular in the nationalist movements.

He died in an automobile accident on E6 near Uddevalla at 26 years of age.

== Filmography ==
- 1995 - Sjukan (television)
- 1996 - Tratten och Finkel (television)
- 1997 - Sanning eller konsekvens
- 1997 - Beck – Pensionat Pärlan
- 1997 - Beck – Spår i mörker
- 1998 - Beck – Öga för öga
- 1998 - Beck – The Money Man
