= Anne-Li Norberg =

Swedish actress (1953–2018)

- Born: 5 October 1953; Sollentuna, Sweden
- Died: 17 August 2018 (aged 64)
- Occupation: Actress
- Years active: 1988-2018

Anne-Li Ingvarsdotter Norberg (5 October 1953 – 17 August 2018) was a Swedish actress. Norberg studied acting at Svenska Artist- och musikskolan and later as well at Kulturama. She graduated from stage school in Malmö in 1978 from the same class as actor Rolf Lassgård. During the 1970s and 1980s, she was in a relationship with actor Peter Haber and the couple had a child together actress Nina Haber.

Norberg died on 17 August 2018 from cancer.

== Selected filmography ==
- 1988: Venus 90 - Receptionist vid Perfecturum
- 1989: S/Y Joy - Seglarflicka
- 1989: Förhöret (TV Movie) - Journalist
- 1990: Black Jack - Policewoman
- 1990: Fiendens fiende (TV Mini-Series) - Bredbergs hustru
- 1991: Goltuppen (TV Mini-Series) - Jansson
- 1991: Harry Lund lägger näsan i blöt! - Eva
- 1993: Sunes sommar - resebyråkvinnan
- 1994: Polismördaren - Sigbrit Mård
- 1995: Tre Kronor (TV Series) - Portiern
- 1995: Tribunal (TV Movie) - Rådgivare
- 1996: Zonen (TV Mini-Series) - Major Drakenberg
- 1997: Emma åklagare (TV Series) - Eva Laurén
- 1997: Snoken (TV Series) - Ursula Sandler
- 1997: Skärgårdsdoktorn (TV Series) - Ann-Catherine Franzén
- 1998: Rederiet (TV Series) - Läkare 8
- 2000: Det grovmaskiga nätet (TV Mini-Series) - Sköterska
- 2001: En sång för Martin
- 2001: Känd från TV - Anchorwoman
- 2002: Beck (TV Series) - Eva Örnberg
- 2001: Jordgubbar med riktig mjölk - Kajsa
- 2002: Bella - bland kryddor och kriminella (TV Series) - Liv
- 2003: Paragraf 9 (TV Series) - Anna-Karin Norberg
- 2005: Kommissionen (TV Series) - Mirjam Nord
- 2005: Örnen (TV Series)
- 2006: Min frus förste älskare - Receptionist
- 2009: Oskyldigt dömd (TV Series)
- 2009-2010: Guds tre flickor (TV Series) - Karin
- 2010: Våra vänners liv (TV Series) - Davids mamma
- 2010: Den fördömde (TV Series)
- 2011: Maria Wern (TV Series) - Sjuksköterska
- 2011: The Girl with the Dragon Tattoo - Lindgren
- 2011: Juni - Oskars mamma
- 2012: Arne Dahl (TV Mini-Series) - Blomsterhandlare
- 2012: Morden i Sandhamn (TV Series) - Eva
- 2013: Bäst före - Ingela
- 2013-2014: Äkta människor (TV Series) - Justitierådet / Justitieråd
- 2014: Tjockare än vatten (TV Series) - Görel Hansson (försäkringsdam)
- 2015: Solsidan (TV Series) - Anita Wechselmann (final appearance)
