= Beck – The Money Man =

1998 Swedish thriller

- Swedish DVD-cover
- Genre: thriller
- Written by: Rolf Börjlind
- Directed by: Harald Hamrell
- Starring: Peter Haber; Mikael Persbrandt; Stina Rautelin
- Music by: Ulf Dageby
- Country of origin: Sweden/Norway/Denmark/Germany
- Original language: Swedish

Production
- Producers: Lars Blomgren; Thomas Lydholm
- Cinematography: Olof Johnson
- Running time: 87 min

Original release
- Release: 1998

Beck – The Money Man is a 1998 television crime thriller about the Swedish police detective Martin Beck directed by Harald Hamrell.

== Cast ==
- Peter Haber as Martin Beck
- Mikael Persbrandt as Gunvald Larsson
- Stina Rautelin as Lena Klingström
- Per Morberg as Joakim Wersén
- Ingvar Hirdwall as Martin Beck's neighbour
- Rebecka Hemse as Inger (Martin Beck's daughter)
- Fredrik Ultvedt as Jens Loftegård
- Michael Nyqvist as John Banck
- Lennart Hjulström as Gavling
- Lasse Lindroth as Peter (Inger's boyfriend)
- Bengt Nilsson as Leonard
- Peter Hüttner as Oljelund
