= Harald Hamrell =

Swedish actor

- Born: Ivar Olof Harald Hamrell; 13 December 1960 (age 64); Uppsala, Sweden
- Occupation(s): Film director, actor

Ivar Olof Harald Hamrell (born 13 December 1960 in Uppsala, Sweden) is a Swedish actor, film director and screenwriter.

He is the son of Swedish mathematician Sonja Lyttkens.

== Selected filmography ==
- 1975 – Pojken med guldbyxorna (TV)
- 1975 – Ungkarlshotellet (TV film)
- 1976 – The Man on the Roof
- 1981 – Operation Leo
- 1984 – Sköna juveler
- 1986 – Studierektorns sista strid (TV)
- 1987 – Nionde kompaniet
- 1988 – Mimmi (TV)
- 1989 – Täcknamn Coq Rouge
- 1990 – Storstad (director)
- 1993 – Snoken (TV) (even director)
- 1994 – Den vite riddaren (TV) (even director)
- 1996 – Sånt är livet
- 1996 – Vinterviken (even director and screenwriter)
- 1998 – Beck – Moneyman (director)
- 1998 – Beck – Monstret (director)
- 1997 – Emma åklagare (TV)
- 1999 – En häxa i familjen (director)
- 1999 – In Bed with Santa (screenwriter)
- 2001 – Beck – Mannen utan ansikte (director)
- 2002 – Beck – Sista vittnet (director)
- 2002 – Beck – Okänd avsändare (even director)
- 2003 – Ramona (even director)
- 2004 – Om Stig Petrés hemlighet (TV) (even director)
- 2006 – Beck – Flickan i jordkällaren (director)
- 2006 – Beck – Skarpt läge (director)
- 2007 – Beck – Det tysta skriket (director)
- 2007 – Beck – Den svaga länken (even director)
- 2008 – Livet i Fagervik (TV)
- 2009 – Beck – I stormens öga (director)
- 2010 – Kommissarie Späck
- 2010 – Beck – Levande begravd (director)
- 2011 – Arne Dahl: Misterioso
- 2012 – Real Humans (TV)
