= Hemse (disambiguation) =

Hemse is a locality in Gotland County, Sweden

Hemse may also refer to:

- Rebecka Hemse, a Swedish actress
- 10124 Hemse, an asteroid
