= Beck – Okänd avsändare =

- Swedish DVD-cover
- Written by: Cilla Börjlind; Rolf Börjlind
- Directed by: Harald Hamrell
- Starring: Peter Haber; Mikael Persbrandt; Malin Birgerson
- Country of origin: Sweden
- Original language: Swedish

Production
- Producers: Lars Blomgren; Börje Hansson
- Running time: 100 min

Original release
- Release: 2002

Beck – Okänd avsändare (English: Beck – Sender Unknown) is a 2002 film about the Swedish police detective Martin Beck directed by Harald Hamrell.

== Cast ==
- Peter Haber as Martin Beck
- Mikael Persbrandt as Gunvald Larsson
- Malin Birgerson as Alice Levander
- Marie Göranzon as Margareta Oberg
- Rebecka Hemse as Inger
- Mårten Klingberg as Nick
- Peter Hüttner as Oljelund
- Gustaf Hammarsten as Klas Duvander
- Ingvar Hirdwall as Valdemar, Martin Beck's neighbour
- Michael Flessas as Jurij Rostoff
- Annika Hallin as Mamman
