= Sanna Lundell =

Swedish television host

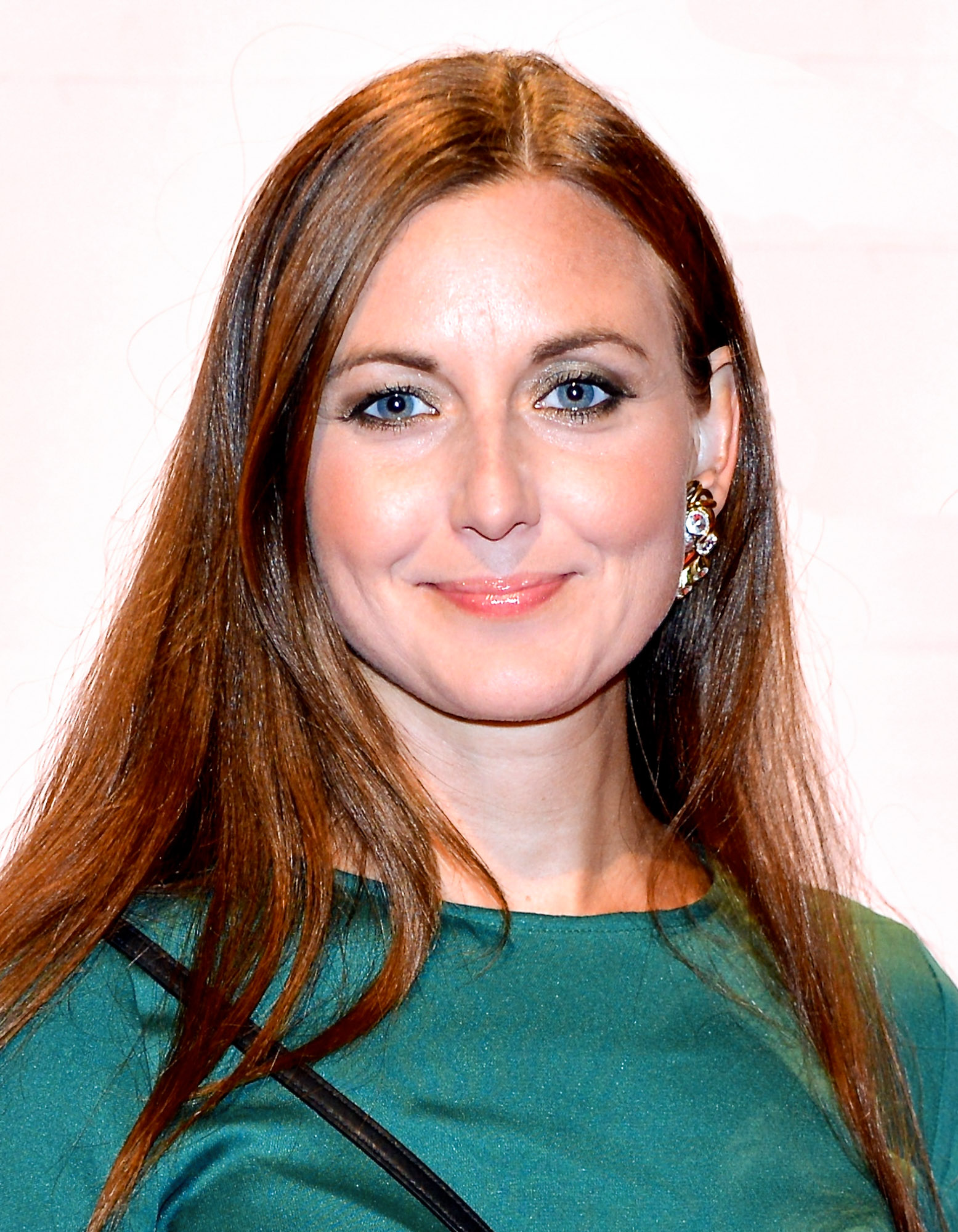
- Sanna Lundell in August 2013
- Born: 6 November 1978 (age 47); Stockholm, Sweden
- Occupations: Television presenter and journalist
- Partner: Mikael Persbrandt (2005–present)
- Children: 4

Sanna Cecilia Lundell (born 6 November 1978) is a Swedish freelance journalist and television presenter.

== Biography ==
Lundell was born in Stockholm, Sweden. She is the daughter of the singer Ulf Lundell. She has done journalistic work for the magazines Mama, M-Magasin, Hennes, and the Aftonbladet newspaper. She has also been working as a television presenter at TV3 with shows such as Sanning och konsekvens along with Robert Aschberg, and Stalkers with Hasse Aro. Since June 2013 she has been presenting the documentary series TV3 Dokumentär. She participated as a celebrity contestant in Let's Dance 2019, which was broadcast on TV4

Lundell is in a relationship with actor Mikael Persbrandt and the couple has three children together. She also has one child from a previous relationship with Wille Crafoord.
