= Mikael Persbrandt =

Swedish actor

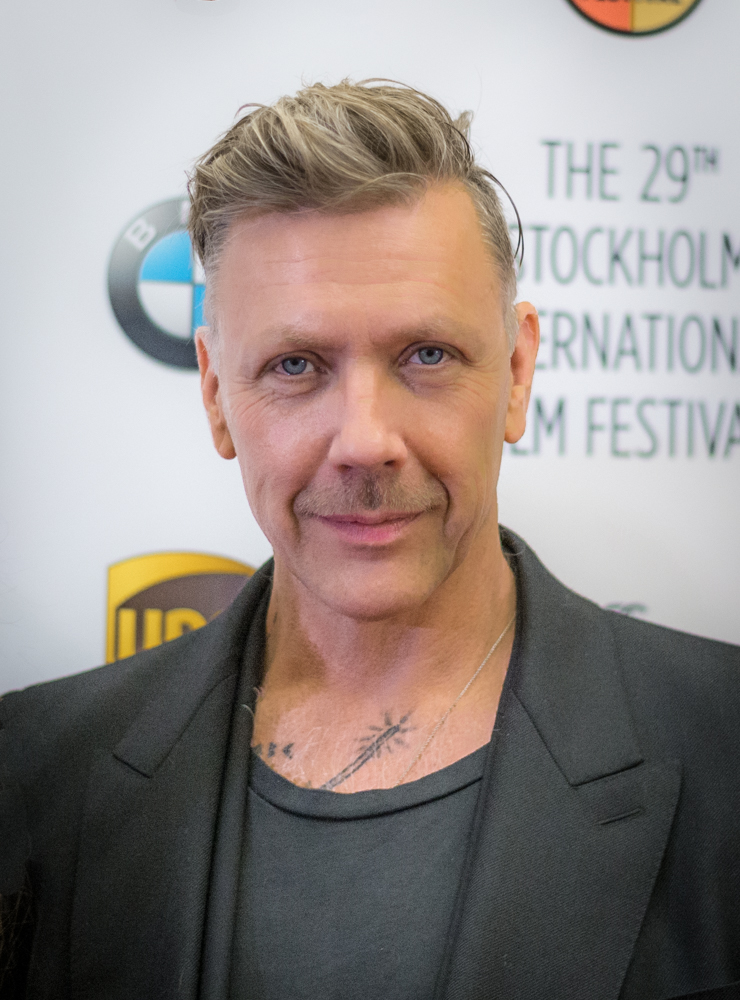
- Persbrandt in 2018
- Born: Mikael Åke Persbrandt; 25 September 1963 (age 63); Järfälla, Stockholm, Sweden
- Occupation: Actor
- Years active: 1984–present
- Partner(s): Maria Bonnevie (1998–2003); Sanna Lundell (2005–present)
- Children: 3

Mikael Åke Persbrandt (Swedish pronunciation: [ˈmîːkaɛl ˈpæ̂ːʂbrant]; born 25 September 1963) is a Swedish actor. In Swedish films, he is perhaps best known for playing Gunvald Larsson in the Beck series of movies. He is internationally known for his starring role in the Academy Award-winning feature, In a Better World, directed by Susanne Bier. His performance earned him a 2011 European Film Award nomination for Best Actor. Other parts include the role of Carl Hamilton from the novels by Jan Guillou, Beorn in The Hobbit, as well as Jakob Nyman in the English TV series Sex Education.

== Early life ==
Persbrandt was born and grew up in Jakobsberg, Järfälla Municipality, Stockholm County. He was baptized in the Finnish Church in Gamla stan. Persbrandt has stated that he has Swedo-Finnish ancestry from Åland on his mother's side, and that he thinks his paternal ancestors were Walloons.

== Career ==
He has performed onstage with the Royal Dramatic Theatre in Stockholm and in numerous film and TV roles. Persbrandt is well known for his role as the hardboiled police inspector Gunvald Larsson, in the Beck series of films. He won the Guldbagge Award for Best Actor in a leading role twice, the first in 2009 for Everlasting Moments and the second in 2014 for Nobody Owns Me. In 2015, Persbrandt reported that he would quit starring in his popular role of Gunvald Larsson. In 2019, Persbrandt began playing Jakob Nyman in the Netflix comedy drama Sex Education. He was a leading actor in the film The Salvation.

== Public image and legal issues ==
=== Sex appeal ===
Persbrandt has often been noted for his good looks, and when Swedish media makes lists of the most attractive Swedish men, he has often been on those lists.

=== Expressen dispute ===
In December 2005, Persbrandt notified police that the newspaper Expressen had made false accusations about him having acute alcohol poisoning and being admitted to a clinic in Uppsala. The information was inaccurate. Expressen apologised and admitted that their information was false, but the apology was not accepted by Persbrandt. Otto Sjöberg, at the time editor of the newspaper was fined 75,000 SEK (≈ 6800 €, US$8900), in damages to Persbrandt.

=== Drug use ===
Persbrandt was arrested twice in 2011 for cocaine use and received a fine. In April 2014, he was sentenced to five months' imprisonment for another cocaine offence, but on appeal this was reduced to 75 hours' community service.

== Personal life ==
He is in a relationship with Sanna Lundell and the couple have three children together. He had previously been married to Maria Bonnevie.

== Theatre ==
All the performances are in Swedish.

Year	Play	Venue	Role
1984	King Lear	The Royal Dramatic Theatre	Extra
1985	Julius Caesar	The Royal Dramatic Theatre	Extra
1991	Rekviem	Teater Galeasen	
1992	Ferrando Bruno	Teater Galeasen	
1993	Gatan	Teater Galeasen	
1993	Roberto Zucco	Teater Galeasen	
1994	Three Sisters	Teater Galeasen	
1995	Änglar	Teater Galeasen	
1996	Puntila	The Royal Dramatic Theatre	
1996	Death of a salesman	Teater Plaza	
1998	The Good Person of Szechwan	The Royal Dramatic Theatre	
1998	Lång dags färd mot natt	The Royal Dramatic Theatre	
1999	Don Juan	The Royal Dramatic Theatre	
2000	Maria Stuart	The Royal Dramatic Theatre	
2000	Vildanden	The Royal Dramatic Theatre	
2002	Leka med elden	The Royal Dramatic Theatre	
2004	Arbetarklassens sista hjältar	Lilla elverket	
2005	Miss Julie	The Royal Dramatic Theatre	
2005	Lik som män	Vasateatern	
2007	Måsen	Teater Galeasen	
2009	I väntan på Godot	Stockholm City Theatre	
2014	Dödsdansen	Maxim Theatre	

== Filmography ==
Film and television roles
Year	Film	Role	Notes
1992	Rederiet	Ola Simonsson	
1994	The Police Murderer	Police 1	
1994	Svensson, Svensson	Jesper	
1995	Sommaren	Peter	
1996	Anna Holt	Jocke	
1996	Under ytan	Roffe	
1997	Beck – Lockpojken	Gunvald Larsson	
1997	Beck – Mannen med ikonerna	Gunvald Larsson	
1997	Beck – Spår i mörker	Gunvald Larsson	
1997	Beck – Pensionat Pärlan	Gunvald Larsson	
1997	9 millimeter	Konstantin	
1998	Beck – Öga för öga	Gunvald Larsson	
1998	Sista kontraktet	Roger Nyman	
1998	102 Years in the Heart of Europe: A Portrait of Ernst Jünger	Reader	Voice role, documentary
1998	Beck – The Money Man	Gunvald Larsson	
1998	Beck – Monstret	Gunvald Larsson	
1998	Beck – Vita nätter	Gunvald Larsson	
1998	Vuxna människor	Georg	
1998	Mulan	Shan Yu	Swedish dubbing
1999	Dödlig drift	Andreas Persson	
1999	Dinosaur	Kron	Swedish dubbing
1999	Gossip	Åke Frigårdh	
2000	Titan A.E.	Tek	Swedish dubbing
2000	Beck – Hämndens pris	Gunvald Larsson	
2001	Beck – Mannen utan ansikte	Gunvald Larsson	
2001	Beck – Kartellen	Gunvald Larsson	
2001	Beck – Enslingen	Gunvald Larsson	
2001	Atlantis: The Lost Empire	Doctor Joshua Strongbear Sweet	Swedish dubbing
2002	Nu	Adam	
2002	Beck – Okänd avsändare	Gunvald Larsson	
2002	Beck – Annonsmannen	Gunvald Larsson	
2002	Beck – Sista vittnet	Gunvald Larsson	
2002	Alla älskar Alice	Johan Lindberg	
2002	Beck – Pojken i glaskulan	Gunvald Larsson	
2003	Rånarna	Frank/Richard	
2003	Tre solar	Ulf	
2003	Finding Nemo	Gill	Voice, Swedish dubbing
2004	Dag och natt	Thomas	
2005	Medicinmannen	Martin Holst	
2005	Bang Bang Orangutang	Åke Jönsson	
2005	Som man bäddar	Jocke	
2005	Inga tårar	Lars Bjerking	
2005	Tjocktjuven	The Priest	
2006	Open Season	Boog	Swedish dubbing
2006	Beck – Skarpt läge	Gunvald Larsson	
2006	Beck – Flickan i jordkällaren	Gunvald Larsson	
2006	Beck – Gamen	Gunvald Larsson	
2006	Beck – Advokaten	Gunvald Larsson	
2007	Beck – Den japanska shungamålningen	Gunvald Larsson	
2007	Beck – Den svaga länken	Gunvald Larsson	
2007	Beck – Det tysta skriket	Gunvald Larsson	
2007	Beck – I Guds namn	Gunvald Larsson	
2007	Ett öga rött	Himself	
2007	Solstorm	Thomas Söderberg	
2008	Kautokeino-opprøret	Carl-Johan Ruth	
2008	Everlasting Moments	Sigfrid Larsson	
2008	Die Patin – Kein Weg zurück	Sergej Assinowitsch	
2008	Himlens hjärta	Lars	
2008	Oskyldigt dömd	Markus Haglund	
2009	Beck – I stormens öga	Gunvald Larsson	
2010	Beck – Levande begravd	Gunvald Larsson	
2010	In a Better World	Anton	
2011	Stockholm East	Johan	
2011	Hamilton: In the Interest of the Nation	Carl Hamilton	
2012	The Hypnotist	Erik Maria Bark	
2012	Agent Hamilton: But Not If It Concerns Your Daughter	Carl Hamilton	
2013	Mig äger ingen	Hasse	
2013	The Hobbit: The Desolation of Smaug	Beorn	
2014	The Hobbit: The Battle of the Five Armies	Beorn	
2014	En sång från hjärtat	Thomas Jacob	
2014	The Salvation	Peter	
2014	Beck – Rum 302	Gunvald Larsson	
2015	Beck – Familjen	Gunvald Larsson	
2015	Beck – Invasionen	Gunvald Larsson	
2015	Beck – Sjukhusmorden	Gunvald Larsson	
2016	Beck – Gunvald	Gunvald Larsson	
2016	Alone in Berlin	Standartenführer Prall	
2016	The Siege of Jadotville	Dag Hammarskjöld	
2017	King Arthur: Legend of the Sword	Greybeard	
2018	Tårtgeneralen	Hasse P	
2018	X&Y	Himself	
2019–2021	Sex Education	Jakob Nyman	Main role
2019	Invisible Heroes	Harald Edelstam	
2020	Eurovision Song Contest: The Story of Fire Saga	Victor Karlosson	
2021	Tills solen går upp / The Unlikely Murderer	Hans Holmér	
2022	The Kingdom	Helmer Jr.	5 episodes
2023	Poromafia	Stagge	8 episodes
2023	Foundation	The Mule	4 episodes
2023	Hammarskjöld	Dag Hammarskjöld	
TBA	Agent Hamilton: In Her Majesty's Service	Carl Hamilton	Filming
TBA	Sophie's War	Franz	Pre-production

== Discography ==
=== Albums ===
Year	Album	Peak positions
Year	Album	DEN
2014	Someone You Love	29
