= Cecilia Häll =

Swedish actress

- Born: Anna Cecilia Ingegärd Häll; 10 June 1978 (age 47); Norrahammar, Sweden
- Occupation: Actress
- Years active: 1995–present
- Spouse: Joakim Nätterqvist (divorced)
- Children: 1

Cecilia Häll (born 10 June 1978) is a Swedish actress. She was married to the actor Joakim Nätterqvist and together they have a child.

== Filmography ==
- Tre kronor (1996–99)
- Lilla Jönssonligan och cornflakeskuppen (1996)
- Beck – Spår i mörker (1997)
- Kommissionen (2005)
- 100 Code (2015)
