= Marika Lindström =

Swedish actress (born 1946)

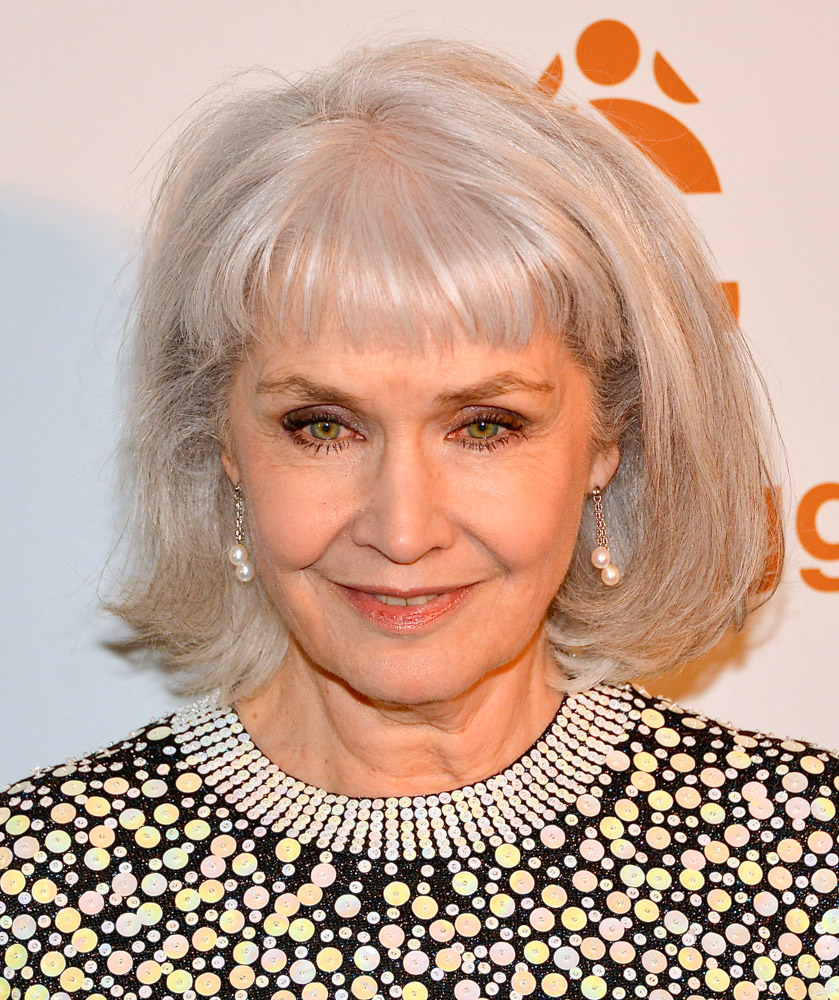
- Lindström in 2013
- Born: 25 November 1946 (age 79); Skellefteå, Sweden
- Occupation: Actress

Marika Lindström (born 25 November 1946) is a Swedish actress who has appeared in numerous films in her native Sweden as well as appearing in TV shows such as Emma åklagare and Tre kärlekar. Marika Lindström has long been a part of the ensemble at Stockholm City Theatre. She appeared in the SVT series Vår tid är nu in 2017.

She was born on 25 November 1946 in Skellefteå, Sweden. She was nominated for the Guldbagge Award for Best Supporting Actress for Burn All My Letters (2022). She was married to fellow actor Ingvar Hirdwall until his death in 2023.
