= Göta kanal 2 – Kanalkampen =

2006 film

- Directed by: Pelle Seth
- Written by: Bengt Palmers (writer)
- Produced by: Anders Birkeland; Göran Lindström
- Cinematography: Jens Fischer
- Edited by: Darek Hodor; Katarina Wiklund
- Release dates: 21 December 2006 (Motala); 25 December 2006 (Sweden)
- Running time: 94 minutes
- Country: Sweden
- Language: Swedish

Göta kanal 2 – Kanalkampen (English: Göta Canal 2 - Canal Battle) is a comedy film directed by Pelle Seth.

It is a sequel to Göta kanal eller Vem drog ur proppen? and was followed by Göta kanal 3: Kanalkungens hemlighet.

The film was first released to the Royal Cinema in Motala on 11 December 2006 before being generally released to cinemas in Sweden on 25 December the same year.

== Cast ==
- Morgan Alling as Röde Börje
- Pino Ammendola as Dario
- Kim Anderzon as Lena
- Sigge Avander as Vaitor / Man with hound in car
- Danilo Bejarano as Sergio
- Mats Bergman as Farmer
- Kjell Bergqvist as Sluiceguard
- Janne 'Loffe' Carlsson as Janne Andersson
- Görel Crona as Sluiceguard-wife
- Daniella Dahmén as Female officer 1
- Henrik Dorsin as Host
- Julia Dufvenius as ICA-cashier
- Rafael Edholm as Benito
- Lena Endre as Vonna Jigert
- Ola Forssmed as Glider
- Svante Grundberg as Canoer
- Peter Haber as excavator-operator
- Magnus Härenstam as Peter Black
- Pia Johansson as Rita
- Nadine Kirschon as Fia
- Maria Langhammer as Female officer 2
- Peter Lorentzon as Patrik
- Regina Lund as Twin
- Henrik Lundström as Basse
- Claes Malmberg
- Claes Månsson as Sailor
- Johan Rabaeus as Isidor Hess
- Eva Röse as Petra Andersson
- Allan Svensson as Sluiceguard
- Linus Wahlgren as Filip
- Johan Wahlström as EU-bureaucrat
- Christopher Wollter as MC-officer
- Katarina Cohen
