= Kjell Sundvall =

Swedish director/producer (born 1953)

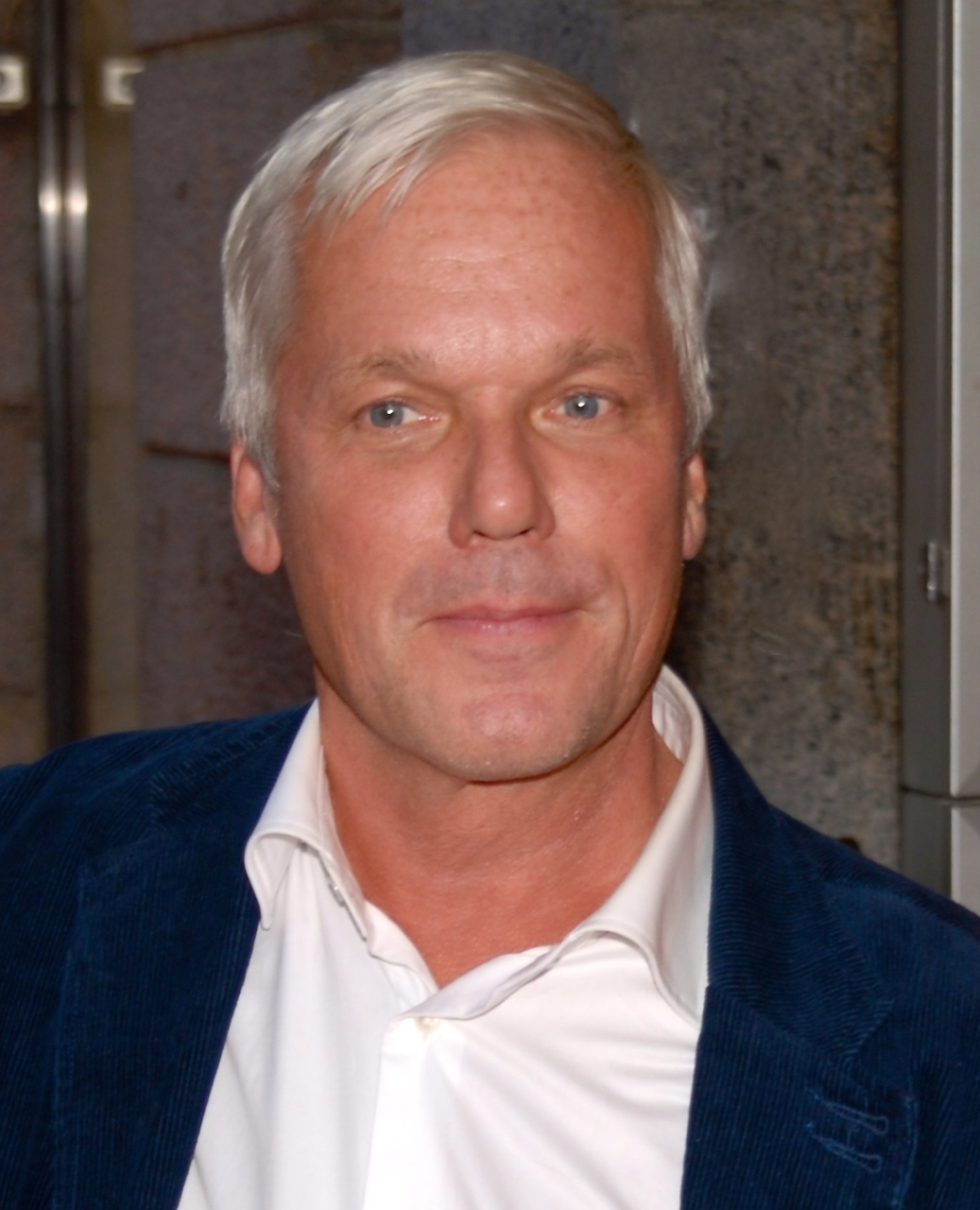
- Sundvall in 2011
- Born: Kjell Gösta Sundvall; 31 March 1953 (age 72); Boden, Sweden
- Occupations: Director, producer
- Years active: 1977–present
- Spouse: Madeleine Stenberg (m. 1988; div. 1992)

Kjell Gösta Sundvall (born 31 March 1953) is a Swedish director/producer.

Sundvall has directed a series of films about the police officer Martin Beck (played by Peter Haber).

== Selected filmography ==
- 2015 - Prästen i paradiset
- 2015 - I nöd eller lust
- 2011 - Jägarna 2
- 2008 - Livet i Fagervik (TV series)
- 2008 - Ulvenatten
- 2007 - Beck – Gamen
- 2006 - Beck – Advokaten
- 2005 - Vinnare och förlorare
- 2004 - Hotet
- 2002 - Grabben i graven bredvid from the book by Katarina Mazetti
- 2002 - Beck – Enslingen
- 2002 - Beck – Kartellen
- 2001 - Beck – Hämndens pris
- 1999 - Tomten är far till alla barnen
- 1998 - c/o Segemyhr
- 1998 - Sista Kontraktet (The Last Contract)
- 1997 - Beck – Pensionat Pärlan
- 1996 - Jägarna (Hunters)
- 1986 - I lagens namn
- 1983 - Lyckans ost
- 1981 - Inget att bråka om, Johansson (TV film)
- 1980 - Vi hade i alla fall tur med vädret (TV film)
- 1980 - Jackpot (TV film)
