= Kommissionen =

Swedish television series

Kommissionen, (in English: The Commission) is a 2005 Swedish TV series comprising 12 episodes.

The series, set in and around Stockholm, deals with the effects and political aftermath of a terrorist attack that destroys Rosenbad, the Ministry for Foreign Affairs and much of the Riksdag building.

Kommissionen was shot in 2004 and was scheduled for airing on SVT in the spring of 2005, but it was postponed until the autumn. When aired on television, it was simultaneously released on DVD and as a book.

== Selected cast ==
- Katarina Ewerlöf - Lena Lagerfeldt,
- Loa Falkman - Rolf G. Johansson, Prime Minister of Sweden
- Chatarina Larsson - Grete Ancker
- Helge Skoog - Sigvard Borg
- Göran Gillinger - Nils Folkesson
- Peter Perski - Karim Mahmoudi
- Cecilia Häll - Unni Hoffner
- Anna Ulrika Ericsson - Anne Petersson
- Thomas Hedengran - Yngwe
