= Måns Nathanaelson =

Swedish actor (born 1976)

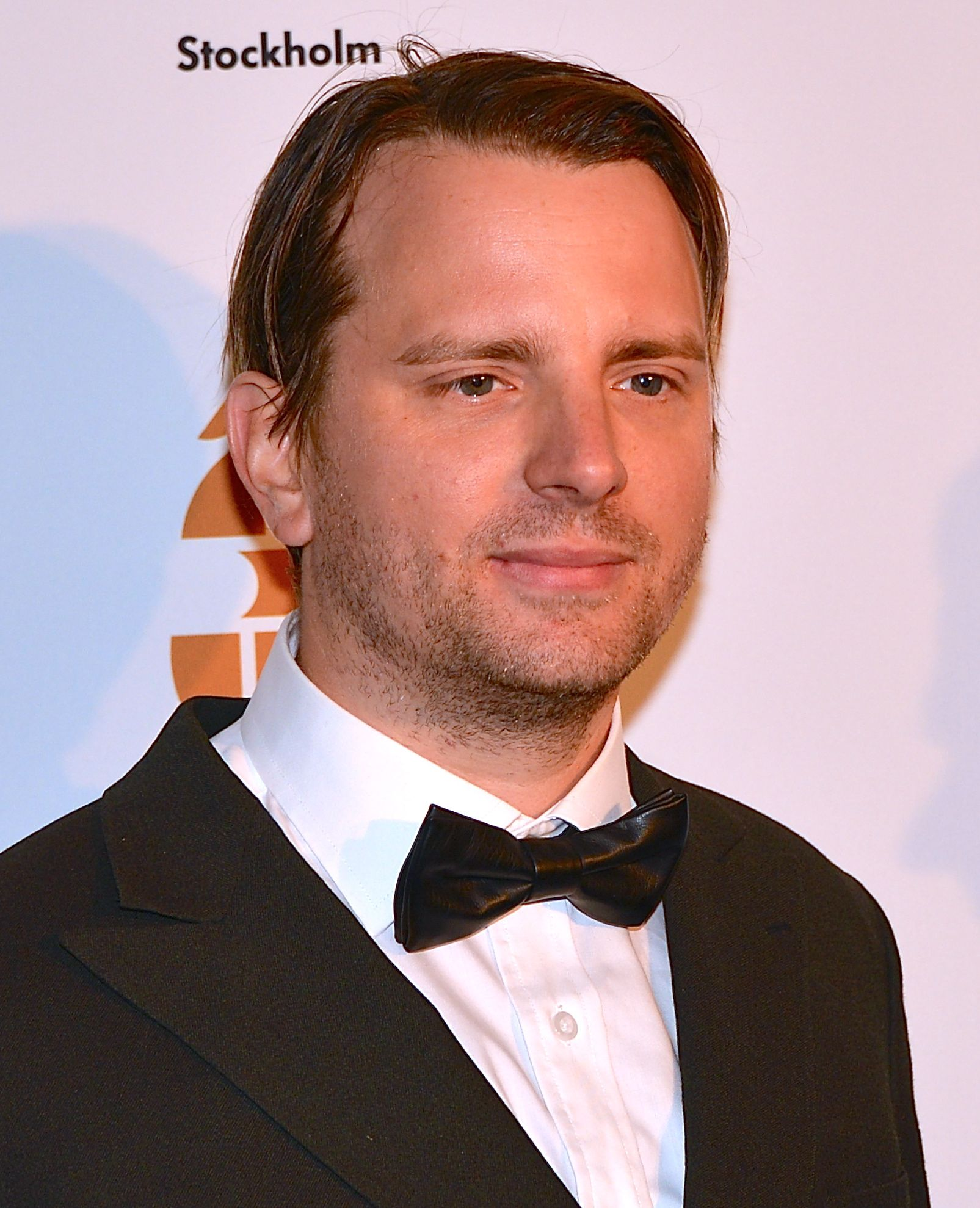
- Born: Måns Gustaf Daniel Nathanaelson; 18 September 1976 (age 49); Stockholm, Sweden
- Occupation: Actor

Måns Gustaf Daniel Nathanaelson (born 18 September 1976 in Stockholm, Sweden) is a Swedish actor, best known his role as Oskar Bergman in the films about the police detective Martin Beck. In 2024, he had a lead role in the SVT Christmas calendar ”Snödrömmar”.

== Filmography ==
- Äkta Människor (2012)
- Beck – Levande begravd (2010)
- I taket lyser stjärnorna (2009)
- Beck – I stormens öga (2009)
- Oskyldigt dömd (2008)
- Beck – I Guds namn (2007)
- Beck – Det tysta skriket (2007)
- Beck – Den svaga länken (2007)
- Beck – Den japanska shungamålningen (2007)
- Beck – Gamen (2007)
- Beck – Advokaten (2006)
- Beck – Flickan i jordkällaren (2006)
- Beck – Skarpt läge (2006)
- Frostbiten (2006)
- Kim Novak badade aldrig i Genesarets sjö (2005)
- Mongolpiparen (2004)
- 1997 – Vita lögner
- 1992–97 - Rederiet
