= Katarina Cohen =

Swedish actress (born 1975)

Katarina Cohen (born 1975) is a Swedish actress. She is best known for her role as Josefin in the TV series Glappet.

She was born in 1975 in Amsterdam. Cohen graduated from the Theaterschool in Stockholm in 2002.

== Filmography ==
- 1996 – Lögn
- 1997 – Glappet
- 1999 – Jakten på en mördare
- 2002 – Suxxess
- 2002 – Rederiet
- 2003 – Järnvägshotellet
- 2004 – Kvarteret skatan
- 2005–2010 – Jonson och Pipen
- 2006 – Göta kanal 2 – Kanalkampen
- 2010 – Tusen gånger starkare
- 2010 – Fröken Märkvärdig & karriären
- 2011 – Gengångare
- 2012 – Isdraken
- 2012 – Arne Dahl: Upp till toppen av berget
- 2013 – Lutningen
