= Peter Perski =

Swedish actor (born 1970)

Peter Perski (born 6 January 1970 in Stockholm) is a Swedish actor.

== Selected filmography ==
- 2008 - Murder in Sweden (TV)
- 2005 - Kommissionen (TV)
- 2004 - Eko
- 2003 - Utan dig
- 2001 - Rederiet (TV)
- 2000 - Livet är en schlager
- 1996 - Jägarna
