= Beck – Enslingen =

- Swedish DVD cover
- Written by: Cilla Börjlind; Rolf Börjlind
- Directed by: Kjell Sundvall
- Starring: Peter Haber; Mikael Persbrandt; Malin Birgerson
- Country of origin: Sweden
- Original language: Swedish

Production
- Producers: Lars Blomgren; Börje Hansson
- Running time: 90 minutes

Original release
- Release: 2002

Beck – Enslingen (English: Beck – The Loner) is a 2002 Swedish police film about Martin Beck, directed by Kjell Sundvall.

== Cast ==
- Peter Haber as Martin Beck
- Mikael Persbrandt as Gunvald Larsson
- Malin Birgerson as Alice Levander
- Marie Göranzon as Margareta Oberg
- Hanns Zischler as Josef Hillman
- Ingvar Hirdwall as Martin Beck's neighbour
- Rebecka Hemse as Inger (Martin Beck's daughter)
- Jimmy Endeley as Robban
- Mårten Klingberg as Nick
- Peter Hüttner as Oljelund
- Carl Kjellgren as Sven Adolfsson
