= Suzanna Dilber =

Swedish actress and author

Suzanna Antoinetta Snezana Dilber (born 16 July 1976 in Norrköping) is a Swedish actor and author.

In March 2012, she made her debut as an author with the novel Double Exposure, followed in 2015 by her second novel, Betrayed.

== Selected filmography ==
- 2013 – Crimes of Passion
- 2011 – Arne Dahl: Misterioso
- 2009 – Beck – I stormens öga
- 2008 – Livet i Fagervik (TV)
- 2007 – Hoppet
- 2005 – Harry Potter and the Goblet of Fire (as Rita Skeeter's voice)
- 2005 – Wallander – Mastermind
- 2005 – Häktet (TV)
- 2003 – Paradiset
