= Beck – Monstret =

- Swedish DVD-cover
- Written by: Rolf Börjlind
- Directed by: Harald Hamrell
- Starring: Peter Haber; Mikael Persbrandt; Stina Rautelin
- Country of origin: Sweden
- Original language: Swedish

Production
- Producers: Lars Blomgren; Thomas Lydholm
- Running time: 84 min

Original release
- Release: 1998

Beck – Monstret (English: Beck – The Monster) is a 1998 film about the Swedish police detective Martin Beck directed by Harald Hamrell.

== Cast ==
- Peter Haber as Martin Beck
- Mikael Persbrandt as Gunvald Larsson
- Stina Rautelin as Lena Klingström
- Per Morberg as Joakim Wersén
- Ingvar Hirdwall as Martin Beck's neighbour
- Rebecka Hemse as Inger (Martin Beck's daughter)
- Fredrik Ultvedt as Jens Loftsgård
- Peter Hüttner as Oljelund
- Björn Gedda as Sture Andersson
- Magnus Roosmann as Gert Ahlgren
- Hans Jonsson as Ove Lundin
- Anna Lindholm as Anita
- Sten Ljunggren as Anita's father
