= Stina Rautelin =

Swedish-speaking Finnish actress (1963–2023)

- Born: Stina Agnes Elisabeth Rautelin; 25 October 1963; Helsinki, Finland
- Died: 26 April 2023 (aged 59); Stockholm, Sweden
- Occupation: Actress
- Children: 2

Stina Agnes Elisabeth Rautelin (25 October 1963 – 26 April 2023) was a Swedish-speaking Finnish actress. She is best known for her role as Lena Klingström in the Swedish television series about Martin Beck. She spoke both Swedish and Finnish.

Rautelin moved to Sweden in 1995 and remained professionally active there. Rautelin died in Stockholm on 26 April 2023, at the age of 59. She had two children.

== Television ==
- Radioskugga (1995)
- På liv och död (1996)
- Beck – Mannen med ikonerna (1997)
- Beck – Spår i mörker (1998)
- Beck – The Money Man (1998)
- Beck – Monstret (1998)
- Beck – Pensionat Pärlan (1998)
- Beck – Öga för öga (1998)
- Beck – Vita nätter (1998)
- Rederiet (1998)
- Beck – Gamen (2006)
- Beck – Flickan i jordkällaren (2006)
- Beck – I Guds namn (2007)
- Beck – Den japanska shungamålningen (2007)
- Beck – Det tysta skriket (2007)
- Beck – Den svaga länken (2007)
- Beck – Advokaten (2007)
- Beck – Levande begravd (2010)
- Beck – Familjen (2015)

== Films ==
- Beck – Lockpojken (1997)
- Tomten är far till alla barnen (1999)
- Tjocktjuven (2006)
