= Beck – Levande begravd =

2009 film by Harald Hamrell

- Written by: Rolf Börjlind; Cecilia Börjlind
- Directed by: Harald Hamrell
- Starring: Peter Haber; Mikael Persbrandt; Stina Rautelin; Måns Nathanaelson
- Country of origin: Sweden
- Original language: Swedish

Production
- Producer: Lars Blomgren

Original release
- Release: 27 December 2009

Beck – Levande begravd (English: Beck – Buried Alive) is a 2009 film about the Swedish police detective Martin Beck directed by Harald Hamrell.

The 26th film in the series of chief inspector Martin Beck, with Peter Haber in the role of Beck and Mikael Persbrandt as Gunvald Larsson. It was directed by Harald Hamrell, the producer was Lars Blomgren and the production company was Filmlance. Recording began in September 2008. Additional members of the cast include Stina Rautelin, Ingvar Hirdwall, Måns Nathanaelson, Rebecka Hemse and Jessica Zandén.

== Plot ==
In a playground in a park, a child finds a buried wooden box, and police discover that it contains the body of a famous and well-respected prosecutor. Martin Beck and his police team initially suspect the criminal leader of a motorcycle gang of the attack, but they have to re-evaluate the case once the gang leader is found murdered, his corpse in a similar wooden box. Soon, more wooden boxes are found and the police realise that they are part of a cat and mouse game with a serial killer. The investigation soon shows that there is a connection between the victims in the form of an event nine years ago, and police think that they know the identity of the killer; but what Martin Beck does not suspect is that his own life is at stake too, as the real murderer has chosen him as the next victim.

== Cast ==
- Peter Haber as Martin Beck
- Mikael Persbrandt as Gunvald Larsson
- Stina Rautelin as Lena Klingström
- Måns Nathanaelson as Oskar Bergman
- Ingvar Hirdwall as Martin Beck's neighbour
- Rebecka Hemse as Inger (Martin Beck's daughter)
- Jessica Zandén as Annika Runfelt
