= Pelle Seth =

Swedish film director, cinematographer, and screenwriter

- Occupation: Director

Per Gustaf ("Pelle") Seth (born 5 June 1946 in Stockholm) is a Swedish film director, cinematographer and screenwriter.

== Selected filmography ==
- 1987 - Träff i helfigur (TV)
- 1997 - Beck – Mannen med ikonerna (director)
- 1997 - Beck – Lockpojken (director)
- 2006 - Göta kanal 2 – Kanalkampen (director)
