= Timothy Earle =

American archaeologist and economic anthropologist

- Born: 1946 (age 79–80)
- Occupation: Anthropologist
- Known for: Political economy of chiefdoms; Staple finance and wealth finance; Materialization of ideology; Maritime mode of production; How Chiefs Come to Power
- Title: Professor emeritus of anthropology
- Awards: Lifetime Achievement Award (Society for American Archaeology, 2023); Felix Neubergh Prize (2020)

Academic background
- Education: Harvard College; University of Michigan

Academic work
- Institutions: Northwestern University; University of California, Los Angeles

Timothy Earle (born 1946) is an American archaeologist and economic anthropologist. He is professor emeritus of anthropology at Northwestern University, where he earlier served as department chair. His research concerns the political economy of chiefdoms and early complex societies, based on comparative archaeological fieldwork in Polynesia, the Andes, and Europe. His work examines long-term social and political change in prehistoric societies, including the relationships between economic organization, political authority, and ideology.

Before Northwestern he taught for more than two decades at the University of California, Los Angeles, where he directed the Institute of Archaeology. His books include How Chiefs Come to Power (1997) and, with Allen W. Johnson, The Evolution of Human Societies (1987; 2nd ed. 2000). Jonathan Haas, reviewing How Chiefs Come to Power in American Anthropologist, called it a "powerful synthesis" of theory and data on the political economy of chiefdoms. Elman R. Service's review of The Evolution of Human Societies in the same journal treated its case analyses of evolutionary change as successful and clearly argued.

Earle was elected to the American Academy of Arts and Sciences in 2014 and to the National Academy of Sciences in 2023. In 2023 he received the Lifetime Achievement Award of the Society for American Archaeology, which credited him with helping to develop the concepts of staple finance and wealth finance in the archaeology of chiefdoms.

== Early life and education ==
Earle received a B.A. in anthropology from Harvard College in 1969 and a Ph.D. in anthropology from the University of Michigan in 1973.

== Career ==
Earle joined the faculty of the University of California, Los Angeles in 1973 and taught there through 1995; he directed UCLA's Institute of Archaeology from 1987 to 1992. During this period, he collaborated with anthropologist Allen W. Johnson, with whom he co-authored The Evolution of Human Societies: From Foraging Group to Agrarian State, first published in 1987.

In 1995 he moved to Northwestern University as professor of anthropology. He served as department chair from 1995 to 2000 and again in 2009–2010, and later became professor emeritus. He served as president of the Archaeology Division of the American Anthropological Association (1993–1997).

== Research ==
=== Comparative political economy ===
Earle's fieldwork has compared pathways to centralized power across regions, including Hawaii, Peru and Argentina in the Andes, and Denmark and Hungary in Europe. Profiles by the American Academy of Arts and Sciences and by Northwestern's Weinberg College describe that comparative work as documenting alternative pathways to centralized power, including irrigation and agricultural intensification, engineered landscapes, and the translation of land tenure into political hierarchy and economic control. Evanston Now likewise notes his interest in attached specialists who produce weapons and wealth, and in prestige-goods exchange.

Long-term comparative fieldwork in Hawaii, Peru, Denmark, and Hungary has examined irrigation, storage, and chiefly political economy across those regions.

In A Primer on Chiefs and Chiefdoms (2020), Earle examined different forms of chiefly political organization through the comparison of their political economies. The book considers variation in the organization of chiefdoms and the economic processes associated with the development and exercise of political authority.

=== Staple finance, wealth finance, and chiefdoms ===
The Society for American Archaeology's 2023 award citation credited his long-term research on chiefdoms with helping to establish "staple finance" and "wealth finance" as standard terms for how political leaders mobilize resources and labor. With Terence N. D'Altroy he developed that distinction in a 1985 Current Anthropology article on storage and finance in the Inka political economy.

In How Chiefs Come to Power: The Political Economy in Prehistory (Stanford University Press, 1997), Earle argued that chiefly authority rests on linked economic, military, and ideological sources of power, using comparative evidence from prehistoric Denmark, Andean Peru, and Hawaii. Haas's American Anthropologist review treated the book as a synthesis of theory and archaeological case material on chiefdom political economy. He surveyed the archaeological and ethnohistorical literature on chiefdoms in a 1987 Annual Review of Anthropology article.

With Allen W. Johnson he published The Evolution of Human Societies: From Foraging Group to Agrarian State (Stanford University Press, 1987; second edition 2000). Service's review of the first edition emphasized the book's clear argument and case-based analysis of evolutionary change.

=== Ideology and Bronze Age economies ===
With Elizabeth DeMarrais and Luis Jaime Castillo he co-authored "Ideology, Materialization, and Power Strategies" (1996), which argued that ideology becomes effective as a source of political power when it is materialized in ceremonies, objects, monuments, and writing.

Earle's research on Bronze Age societies has examined economic organization and the relationship between production, exchange, and political authority. His books include Bronze Age Economics: The Beginnings of Political Economies (2002) and Organizing Bronze Age Societies (Cambridge University Press, 2010), edited by Earle and Kristian Kristiansen. The latter compares household economies and settlement organization in Sicily, Hungary, and southern Scandinavia.

=== Maritime mode of production ===
With Johan Ling and Kristian Kristiansen, Earle co-authored "Maritime Mode of Production: Raiding and Trading in Seafaring Chiefdoms" (2018), published in Current Anthropology. The article proposed a model of maritime political economies in which raiding, trading, and the control of seafaring activities contributed to the organization of chiefly power.

Drawing on archaeological evidence from Bronze Age Scandinavia and comparisons with Viking Age societies, the authors examined how control over boats, trading expeditions, and maritime networks could enable political leaders to mobilize wealth and maintain relationships extending beyond agricultural settlements. They presented maritime production and exchange as a possible pathway to political organization in societies characterized by dispersed populations and long-distance interaction.

=== Premodern economies ===
With archaeologist Kenneth Hirth, Earle edited Premodern Economies: A Global Perspective (Cambridge University Press, 2026), a comparative volume examining the organization of economic activity in societies before or outside extensive integration with modern economic systems.

The volume compares thirteen cases of premodern economies, examining processes such as resource mobilization, labor organization, economic specialization, exchange, inequality, and the distribution of goods. Its comparative approach considers differences in political scale and economic institutions across societies.

In their introductory chapter, Hirth and Earle described the project as an effort to develop a comparative understanding of economic organization using archaeological, historical, and anthropological evidence. The book addresses economic processes including household production, specialization, labor, commerce, and the relationship between economic activity and political institutions.

== Awards and honors ==
Earle received the Felix Neubergh Prize in archaeology from the University of Gothenburg in 2020. In 2023 the Society for American Archaeology awarded him its Lifetime Achievement Award. He was elected a fellow of the American Academy of Arts and Sciences in 2014 and a member of the National Academy of Sciences in 2023.

== Selected works ==
=== Books ===
- Johnson, Allen W.; Earle, Timothy (2000). The Evolution of Human Societies: From Foraging Group to Agrarian State (2nd ed.). Stanford University Press. ISBN 978-0-8047-3873-6.
- Earle, Timothy (1997). How Chiefs Come to Power: The Political Economy in Prehistory. Stanford University Press. ISBN 978-0-8047-2856-0.
- Earle, Timothy (2002). Bronze Age Economics: The Beginnings of Political Economies. Westview Press. ISBN 978-0-8133-3877-4.
- Earle, Timothy; Kristiansen, Kristian, eds. (2010). Organizing Bronze Age Societies: The Mediterranean, Central Europe, and Scandinavia Compared. Cambridge University Press. doi:10.1017/CBO9780511779282. ISBN 978-0-521-76466-7.
- Earle, Timothy (2020). A Primer on Chiefs and Chiefdoms. Eliot Werner Publications. ISBN 978-0-9898249-9-6.
- Hirth, Kenneth; Earle, Timothy, eds. (2026). Premodern Economies: A Global Perspective. Cambridge University Press. doi:10.1017/9781009677202. ISBN 9781009677219.

=== Selected articles ===
- D'Altroy, Terence N.; Earle, Timothy K. (1985). "Staple Finance, Wealth Finance, and Storage in the Inka Political Economy". Current Anthropology. 26 (2): 187–206. doi:10.1086/203249.
- Earle, Timothy (1987). "Chiefdoms in Archaeological and Ethnohistorical Perspective". Annual Review of Anthropology. 16: 279–308. doi:10.1146/annurev.an.16.100187.001431.
- DeMarrais, Elizabeth; Castillo, Luis Jaime; Earle, Timothy (1996). "Ideology, Materialization, and Power Strategies". Current Anthropology. 37 (1): 15–31. doi:10.1086/204472.
- Ling, Johan; Earle, Timothy; Kristiansen, Kristian (2018). "Maritime Mode of Production: Raiding and Trading in Seafaring Chiefdoms". Current Anthropology. 59 (5): 488–524. doi:10.1086/699613. hdl:10852/65647.
