= Per Morberg =

Swedish actor (born 1960)

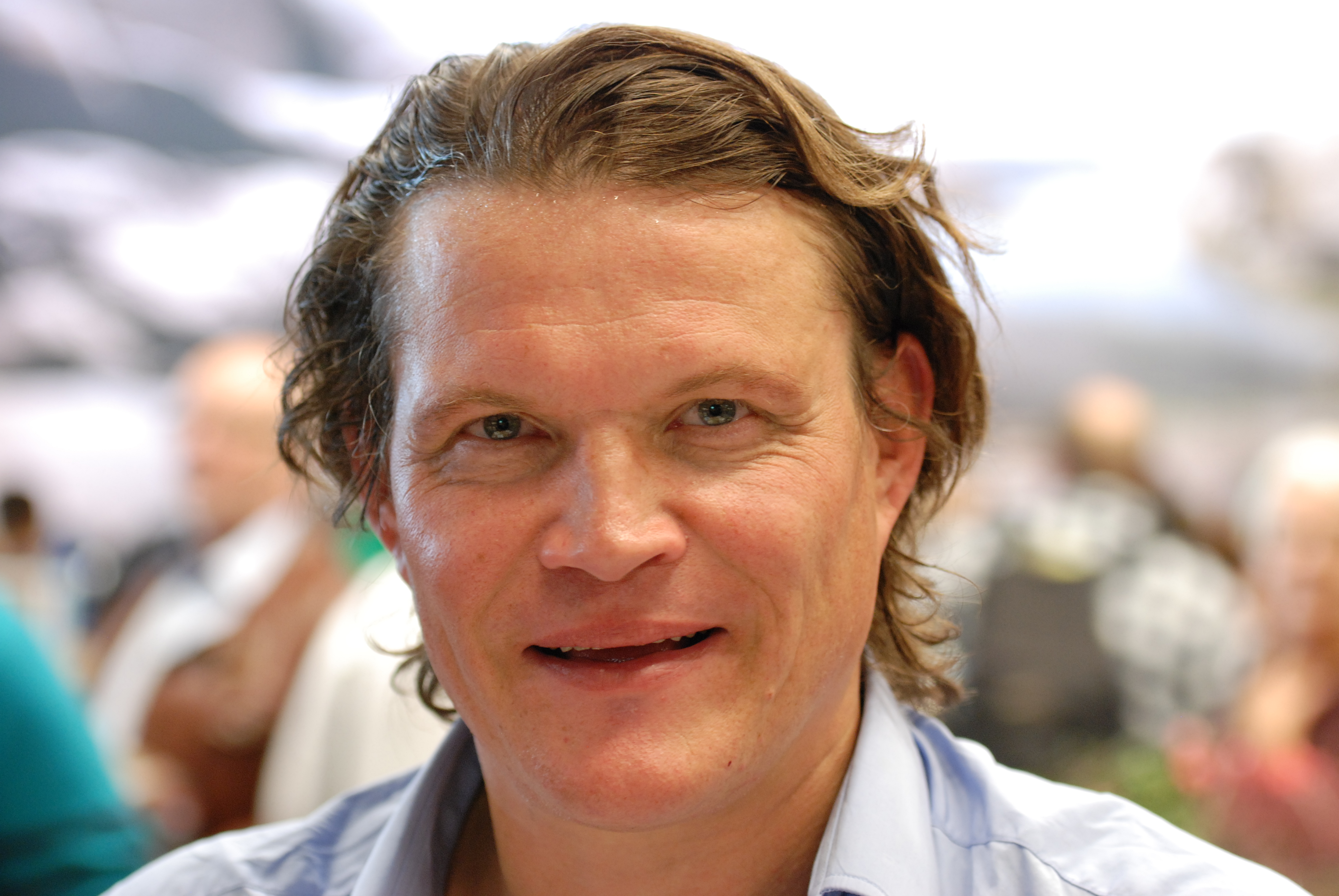
- Morberg in 2013
- Born: Per Henrik Andersson; 23 June 1960 (age 65); Brännkyrka, Stockholm, Sweden
- Occupations: Actor, author, chef
- Years active: 1987–present
- Spouse: Inese Bergs (m. 1988)
- Children: 5, including Alida

Per Henrik Morberg (né Andersson; born 23 June 1960) is a Swedish actor, author, chef, and TV host.

== Biography ==
Morberg grew up in Hökarängen and Sköndal in Stockholm. He competed in judo when he was a teenager. He is a black belt and was named Swedish and Scandinavian champion. He came third at the 1977 European Cadet Championship. He was trained as a chef at Kristineberg restaurant school and has worked as a professional such.

After a theatre lesson at Studiefrämjandet 1982, Morberg was advised to attend a stage school. He attended theatre and opera school in Gothenburg and first acted at Angered's Theatre, where he played the main role of Armand in Kameliadamen. He has toured with the National Swedish Touring Theatre in several sets and was notable for his role as Molina in Kiss of the Spider Woman. At the Royal Dramatic Theatre Morberg has acted in several plays, including Dangerous Liaisons and August Strindberg's Miss Julie. Used to playing serious characters, Morberg achieved unexpected success playing Max Detweiler in a 1995 adaptation of Sound of Music at Göta Lejon.

Morberg is well known for his role as Joakim Wersén in Beck, the Swedish crime dramas based on the character Martin Beck.

== Selected filmography ==
- Kommisarie Späck (2010)
- Wallander – Vålnaden (2010)
- 2007+2009 – Vad blir det för mat?
- Kommissarien och havet (2009)
- 2007 – Upp till kamp
- 2007 – Luftens helter
- Historien om allt (2005)
- Wallander – Mörkret (2005)
- As It Is in Heaven (2004)
- 2003–2004 – Hem till Midgård
- 2003 – Talismanen
- Jordgubbar med riktig mjölk (2001)
- Beck – Hämndens pris (2001)
- 2001 – Fru Marianne
- 1998 – Zingo
- Beck – Vita nätter (1998)
- Beck – Öga för öga (1998)
- Beck – Monstret (1998)
- Beck – The Money Man (1998)
- 1997 – Vita lögner
- Beck – Gula spår i snön (1997)
- Beck – Pensionat Pärlan (1997)
- Beck – Mannen med ikonerna (1997)
- Beck – Lockpojken (1997)
- Kalle Blomkvist – Mästerdetektiven lever farligt (1996)
- Bert: The Last Virgin (1995)
- 1994 – Rederiet
- 1990 – Fiendens fiende
- 1989 – 1939
- 1987 – Svenska hjärtan
