= Anna Ulrica Ericsson =

Swedish actress

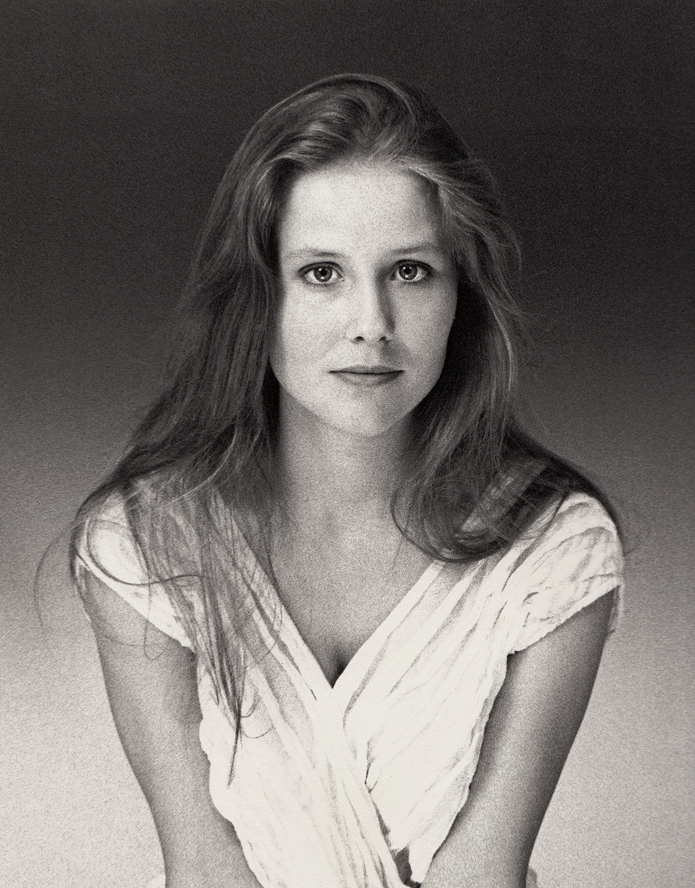
- Anna Ulrica Ericsson 1990
- Born: 30 December 1966 (age 58); Stockholm, Sweden

Anna Ulrica Ericsson (born 30 December 1966) is a Swedish actress.

Ericsson made her debut as actress as she studied at high school in Gösta Jansson's local revues. She met the playwright Bo Sigvard Nilsson at the recreation center. Ericsson studied at the stage school in Malmö 1987–90 and except the studies she has spent one year in Buffalo, United States, where she studied drama. After that she has been engaged at Borås City Theatre, Stockholm City Theatre and Helsingborg City Theatre.

== Filmography ==
- Wallander – Hämnden (2009)
- 2006 – Mästerverket
- 2005 – Kvalster
- Sex, hopp & kärlek (2005)
- Four Shades of Brown (2004)
- Beck – Öga för öga (1998)
- 1998 – Rederiet
- Beck – Vita nätter (1998)
- Beck – Pensionat Pärlan (1997)
- Beck – Mannen med ikonerna (1997)
- Beck – Lockpojken (1997)
- 1995 – Som löven i Vallombrosa
- Chefen fru Ingeborg (1993)
