= Rebecka Hemse =

Swedish actress

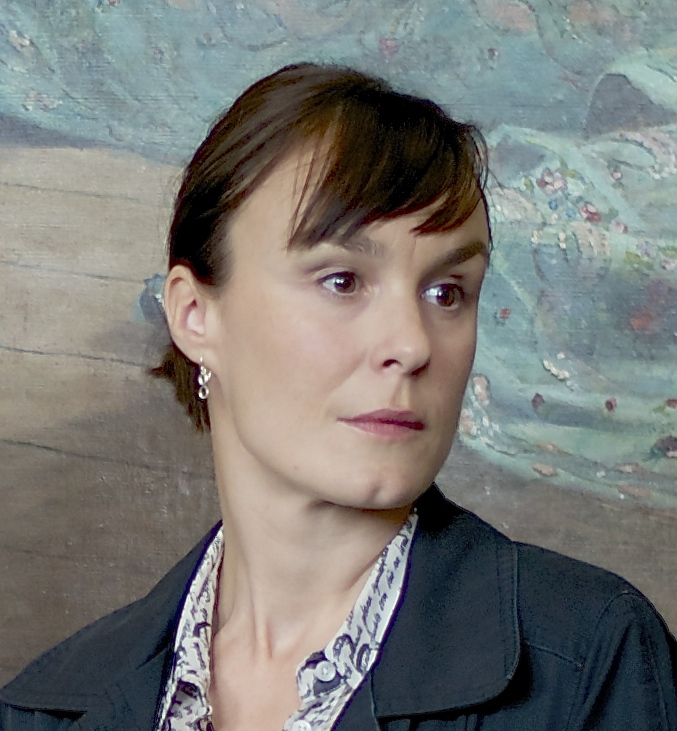
- Hemse in 2014.
- Born: Ingrid Rebecka Elisabet Hemse; 4 August 1975 (age 50); Södertälje, Sweden
- Occupation: Actress
- Years active: 1993–present

Ingrid Rebecka Elisabet Hemse (born 4 August 1975) is a Swedish actress. She is best known for her role as Martin Beck's daughter Inger.

She works at the Royal Dramatic Theatre in Stockholm.

In 2008, she was Ofelia in Staffan Valdemar Holm's theatre play Hamlet and Karoline in the play Kasimir och Karoline. In 2009, she was Sanna Rönne in Final.

Earlier Hemse has played Clara in Riddartornet (2004), Mária Jefimovna Grékova in Platonov (2005), the princess from Athens in Fedra (2006), and Agnes in August Strindberg's Ett drömspel (2007).

== Filmography ==
- Arctic Crimes (2019)
- Quicksand (2019)
- Jordskott (2017)
- Beck – Sjukhusmorden (2015)
- Beck – Invasionen (2015)
- Beck – Familjen (2015)
- Beck – Rum 302 (2015)
- Beck – Levande begravd (2010)
- Just Another Love Story (2007)
- Beck – I Guds namn (2007)
- Beck – Det tysta skriket (2007)
- Beck – Den svaga länken (2007)
- Beck – Den japanska shungamålningen (2007)
- Beck – Gamen (2007)
- Beck – Advokaten (2006)
- Beck – Flickan i jordkällaren (2006)
- Beck – Skarpt läge (2006)
- Drowning Ghost (2004)
- Details (2003)
- Beck – Sista vittnet (2002)
- Beck – Pojken i glaskulan (2002)
- Beck – Annonsmannen (2002)
- Beck – Okänd avsändare (2002)
- Beck – Enslingen (2002)
- Beck – Kartellen (2002)
- Beck – Mannen utan ansikte (2001)
- Beck – Hämndens pris (2001)
- Syndare i sommarsol (2001)
- Judith (2000)
- Beck – Vita nätter (1998)
- Beck – Öga för öga (1998)
- Beck – Monstret (1998)
- Beck – The Money Man (1998)
- Beck – Spår i mörker (1997)
- Chock (1997)
- Beck – Pensionat Pärlan (1997)
- Beck – Mannen med ikonerna (1997)
- Beck – Lockpojken (1997)
- Sebastian (1995)
- Radioskugga (1995)
- Sökarna (1993)
