= Beck – Pensionat Pärlan =

1997 Swedish television film

- Swedish DVD cover
- Written by: Rolf Börjlind
- Directed by: Kjell Sundvall
- Starring: Peter Haber; Mikael Persbrandt; Stina Rautelin
- Country of origin: Sweden
- Original language: Swedish

Production
- Producers: Lars Blomgren; Thomas Lydholm
- Running time: 86 minutes

Original release
- Release: 1997

Beck – Pensionat Pärlan (English: Beck – The Boarding House Pearl) is a 1997 Swedish police film about Martin Beck, directed by Kjell Sundvall.

== Cast ==
- Peter Haber as Martin Beck
- Mikael Persbrandt as Gunvald Larsson
- Stina Rautelin as Lena Klingström
- Per Morberg as Joakim Wersén
- Rebecka Hemse as Inger (Martin Beck's daughter)
- Michael Nyqvist as John Banck
- Anna Ulrica Ericsson as Yvonne Jäder
- Peter Hüttner as Oljelund
- Lennart Hjulström as Gavling
- Lasse Lindroth as Peter
