= Paul Fried (actor) =

Swedish actor, writer, and priest

Paul Mikael Fried (born 24 April 1958) is a former Swedish actor and former Swedish writer. He was born in Malmö, but grew up in Halmstad. He is priest of the Church of Sweden. He studied at NAMA in Stockholm 1983–86 and has been engaged at including Östgötateatern, Uppsala City Theatre, National Swedish Touring Theatre and Judiska teatern.

== Bibliography ==
- 1975 – Nacksving!

== Filmography ==
- Hassel-Privatspanarna (2012)
- Bastarderna i Paradiset (2000)
- Han älskar dig (2000)
- Beck – Mannen med ikonerna (1997)
