= Michael Nyqvist =

Swedish actor (1960–2017)

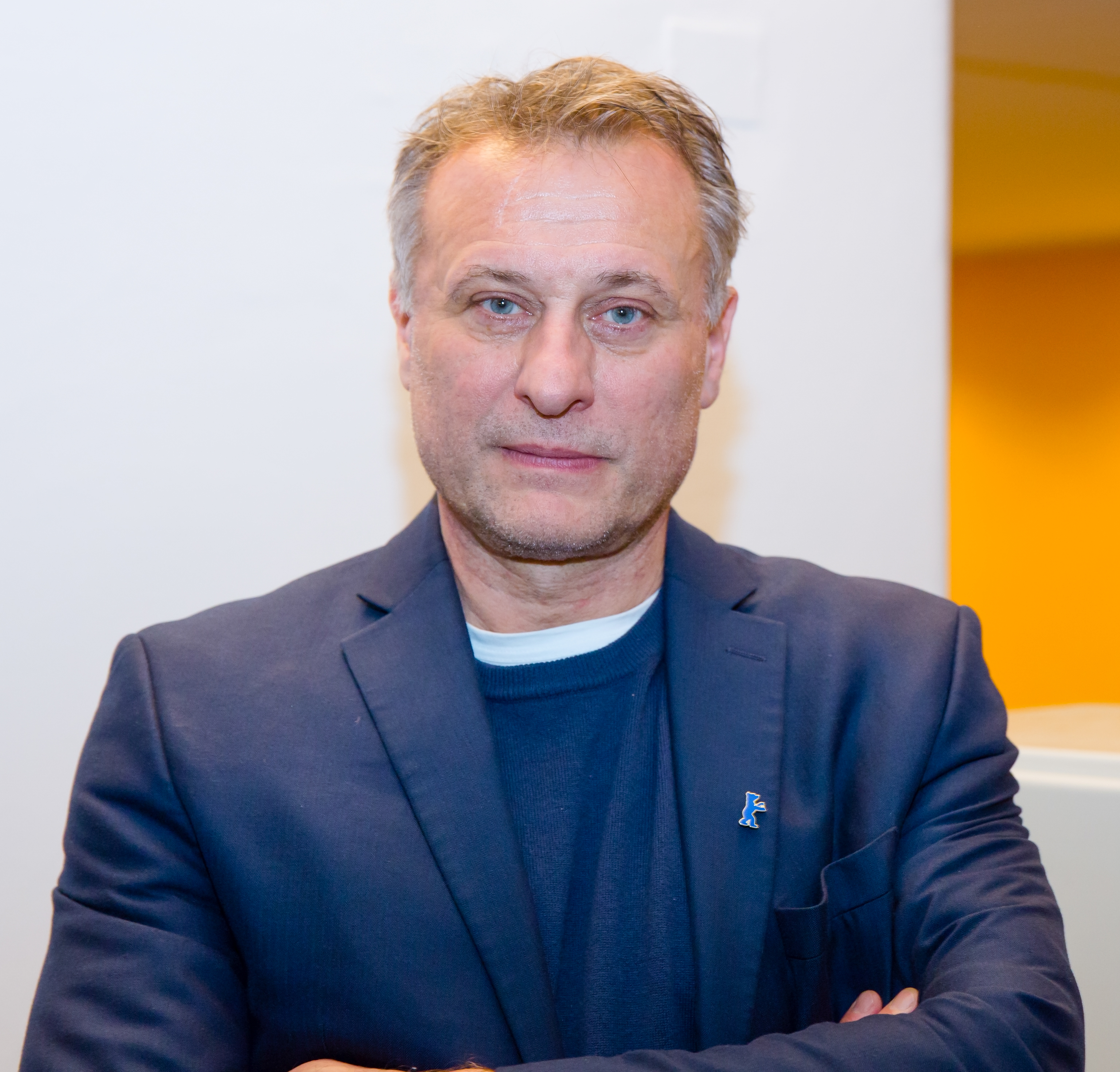
- Nyqvist in 2016
- Born: Rolf Åke Mikael Nyqvist; 8 November 1960; Stockholm, Sweden
- Died: 27 June 2017 (aged 56); Stockholm, Sweden
- Education: Malmö Theatre Academy
- Occupations: Actor, writer
- Years active: 1982–2017
- Spouse: Catharina Ehrnrooth (m. 1990)
- Children: 2

Rolf Åke Mikael Nyqvist (Swedish: [ˈnŷːkvɪst]; 8 November 1960 – 27 June 2017) was a Swedish actor. Educated at the Malmö Theatre Academy, he rose to prominence domestically for playing police officer John Banck in Beck (1997-1998) and for his leading role in the 2002 film Grabben i graven bredvid.

He later received international attention for his role as Mikael Blomkvist in the 2009 film adaptations of Stieg Larsson's Millennium series: The Girl with the Dragon Tattoo, The Girl Who Played with Fire and The Girl Who Kicked the Hornets' Nest, as well as reprising the role in the accompanying television series. He also notably portrayed antagonists Kurt Hendricks in Mission: Impossible – Ghost Protocol (2011) and Viggo Tarasov in John Wick (2014). In 2004, he played the leading role in As It Is in Heaven which was nominated for Best Foreign Language Film at the 77th Academy Awards.

== Early life ==
Rolf Åke Mikael Nyqvist was born on 8 November 1960 in Stockholm, the son of Marcello Lo Cicero, an Italian pharmacist from Florence, and a Swedish mother (born 1941). As a child, he was adopted from an orphanage by Åke Nyqvist and his wife Gerd Ellen Maria (Nordborg) Nyqvist. At age 17, Nyqvist spent his senior year of high school as an exchange student in Omaha, Nebraska. There, he took his first acting class and played a small part in the school's production of Death of a Salesman by Arthur Miller.

He returned to Sweden and was accepted at ballet school, but gave it up after one year. An ex-girlfriend suggested he try theatre, and at age 24, he was accepted to the Malmö Theatre Academy.

== Career ==
Nyqvist's first major role was as police officer John Banck in the first set of Beck TV series in 1997. His first big breakthrough came in 2000 with the film Together directed by Lukas Moodysson. The movie achieved great international success and earned Nyqvist his first Guldbagge Award nomination for Best Actor in a Supporting Role for his portrayal of a misguided husband with anger issues. He later played the leading man in the Swedish romantic comedy Grabben i graven bredvid for which he won a Guldbagge Award for Best Actor in Leading Role.

"If the measure of an actor is the impression made on the audience, well, then Michael Nyqvist is the greatest of all time."

— American actor Greg Poehler paid his last respect to Nyqvist after the Swedish actor died on 27 June 2017.

In 2004, he played the lead role in As It Is in Heaven as Daniel Daréus, a conductor and musician. As It Is in Heaven was nominated for an Academy Award for Best Foreign Film. In 2006, he starred in Suddenly where Nyqvist plays Lasse – a man who must come to terms with the sudden loss of his wife and son. In the 2007 film The Black Pimpernel, Nyqvist portrays Swedish ambassador to Chile, Harald Edelstam, who helped many people flee execution by dictator Augusto Pinochet during and after the 1973 Chilean coup d'état.

Nyqvist received international attention starring as Mikael Blomkvist in The Girl with the Dragon Tattoo (Swedish title: Män som hatar kvinnor), The Girl Who Played with Fire (Swedish title: Flickan som lekte med elden), and The Girl Who Kicked the Hornets' Nest (Swedish title: Luftslottet som sprängdes). These films were adapted from the Millennium series of novels by Stieg Larsson.

He starred as a terrorist in the 2011 film, Abduction, directed by John Singleton. He was also part of the permanent ensemble at the Swedish Royal Dramatic Theatre. Nyqvist appeared in the 2011 action thriller Mission: Impossible – Ghost Protocol, the fourth film of the series. In the film, Nyqvist portrays a madman code-named 'Cobalt', who wants to instigate a global war between Russia and the United States because he believes a war will restore ecological balance to the planet. In 2014, he appeared in John Wick as a New York Russian mob boss who is forced to protect his son from a legendary hit man played by Keanu Reeves. In one of Nyqvist's final roles, he starred as Russian captain Sergei Andropov, one of only three survivors of a sabotaged submarine in Hunter Killer. The movie was released posthumously on 26 October 2018. He is interviewed on the DVD and Blu-ray releases; in the section on the production of the movie.

== Personal life ==
Nyqvist described his childhood, including being placed in an orphanage, his adoption, and his search for his biological parents, in his autobiographical memoir Just After Dreaming (Swedish: När barnet lagt sig), published in 2010. In the book, he reflects on discovering his adoption and the emotional process of reconnecting with his birth parents later in life.

In 1990, he married Finnish scenographer Catharina Ehrnrooth. The couple had two children, a daughter and a son.

== Death ==
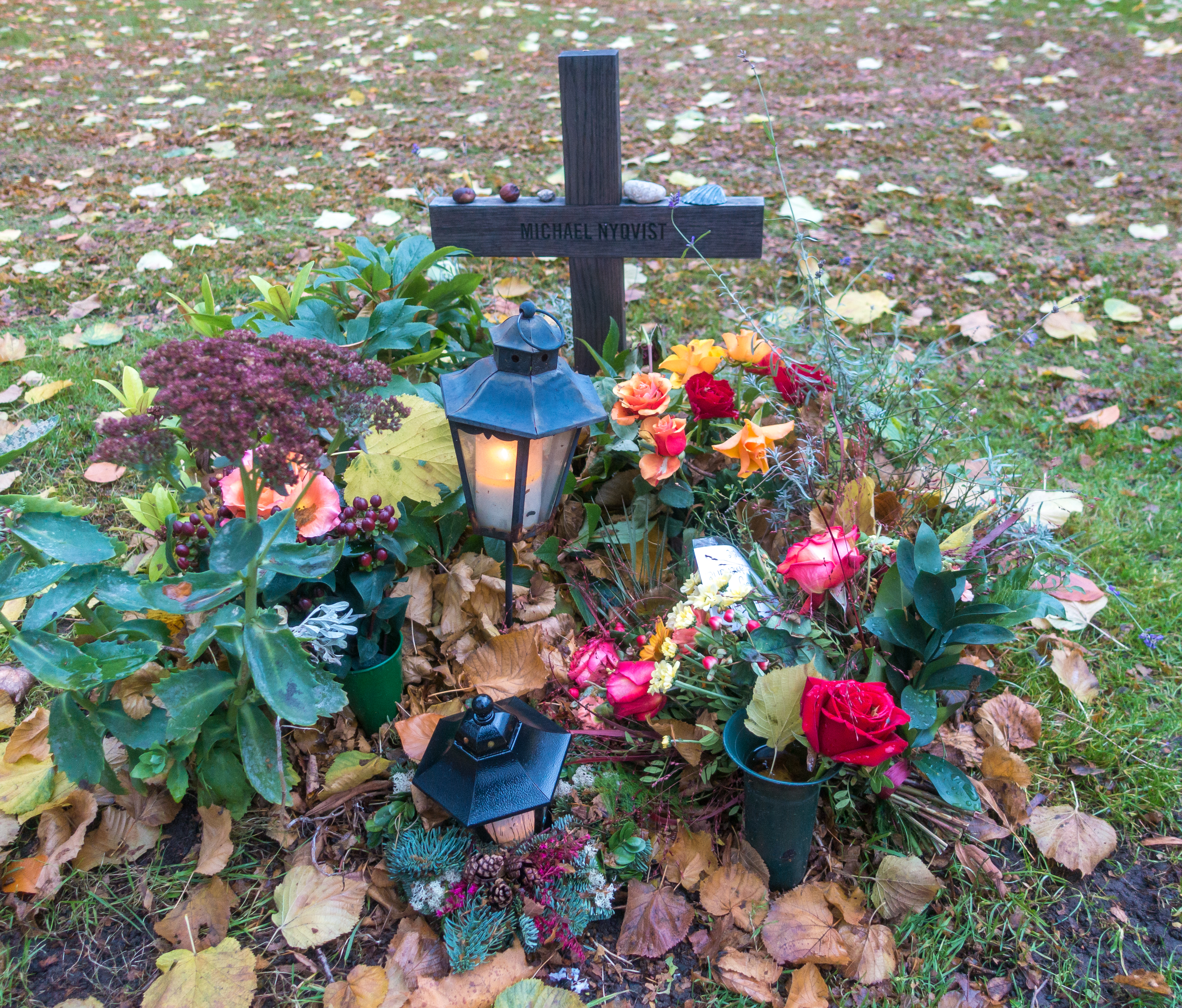
Michael Nyqvist's grave at Katarina Cemetery, Stockholm, in November 2020

Nyqvist died of lung cancer on 27 June 2017 in Stockholm at the age of 56.

== Filmography ==
Year	Title	Role	Notes
1982	Kamraterna	The model	TV film
1987	Jim och piraterna Blom		
1990	Pass		TV film
1996	Jerusalem	Carpenter 1	
1996	Sånt är livet	Kalle Andersson	
1997	Tic Tac	Vinni	
1997–1998	Beck	John Banck	TV series, 7 episodes
1998	Nightwalk		Short
1998	Waiting for the Tenor	The director	
1998	Personkrets 3:1	Karl-Erik	TV film
1999	Breaking out	Diego	
1999	En dag i taget	Henrik	TV series
2000	10:10	Magnus	Short
2000	Together	Rolf	Nominated – Guldbagge Award for Best Actor in a Supporting Role
2000	Hjärta av sten	Lev	
2001	Making Babies	Doctor	
2001	Home Sweet Home	Kent	
2002	Grabben i graven bredvid	Benny	Guldbagge Award for Best Actor in a Leading Role
2002	Bäst i Sverige!	Giuseppe	
2003	Smala Sussie	Mörka Rösten ("Dark Voice")	
2003	Detailjer	Erik	
2004	London Voodoo	Magnus	
2004	ABBA: Our Last Video Ever		TV short
2004	Day and night	Jacob	
2004	As It Is in Heaven	Daniel Daréus	Academy Award for Best Foreign Language Film nominated film Nominated – Guldbagge Award for Best Actor in a Leading Role
2005	Shadow world	Henrik	Short
2005	Naboer	Åke	
2005	Mother of Mine	Hjalmar Jönsson	Nominated – Guldbagge Award for Best Actor in a Supporting Role
2005	Bang Bang Orangutang	Sven Blomberg	
2005	Wallander: Mastermind	Lothar Kraftzcyk	
2006	Search	Janne	
2006	Elias og kongeskipet	Joviale	Swedish version, Voice
2006	Suddenly	Lasse	
2007	The Black Pimpernel	Harald Edelstam	
2007	Arn: The Knight Templar	Magnus Folkesson	
2008	The Kautokeino Rebellion	Lars Levi Laestadius	
2008	Downloading Nancy	Stan	
2008	Iscariot	Masen	
2009	The Girl with the Dragon Tattoo	Mikael Blomkvist	
2009	The Girl Who Played with Fire	Mikael Blomkvist	
2009	Bröllopsfotografen	Stage actor	
2009	The Girl Who Kicked the Hornet's Nest	Mikael Blomkvist	
2010	The Woman That Dreamed About a Man	Johan	
2010	Among Us	Ernst	
2010	Kennedy's Brain	Lars Hakansson	TV film
2011	The Man from Beijing	Staffan	TV film
2011	Abduction	Nikola Kozlow	
2011	Mission: Impossible – Ghost Protocol	Kurt Hendricks	
2012	Disconnect	Stephen Schumacher	
2013	Zero Hour	White Vincent	TV series
2013	Europa Report	Andrei Blok	
2013	The Girl from Nagasaki	Father Lars	
2013	Days and Nights	Johan	
2014	Paris Follies	Jesper	
2014	Min så kallade pappa	Martin Sandahl	
2014	John Wick	Viggo Tarasov	
2014	100 Code	Mikael Eklund	TV series
2015	The Girl King	Chancellor Axel Oxenstierna	
2015	Colonia	Paul Schäfer	Nominated – German Film Award for Best Supporting Actor
2015	The Girl in the Book	Milan Daneker	
2016	Frank & Lola	Alan Larsson	
2016	Den allvarsamma leken	Markel	
2016	I.T.	Henrik	
2017	Madiba	Hendrik Verwoerd	Miniseries
2017	Du Forsvinder	Bernard Berman	
2018	Kursk	Nesterov	Posthumous release
2018	Hunter Killer	Captain Sergei Andropov	Posthumous release
2019	A Hidden Life	Bishop Joseph Fliessen	Final film role; Posthumous release

== Bibliography ==
- Dansa för oss (2013)
- När barnet lagt sig (2011)
