= Ingvar Hirdwall =

Swedish actor (1934–2023)

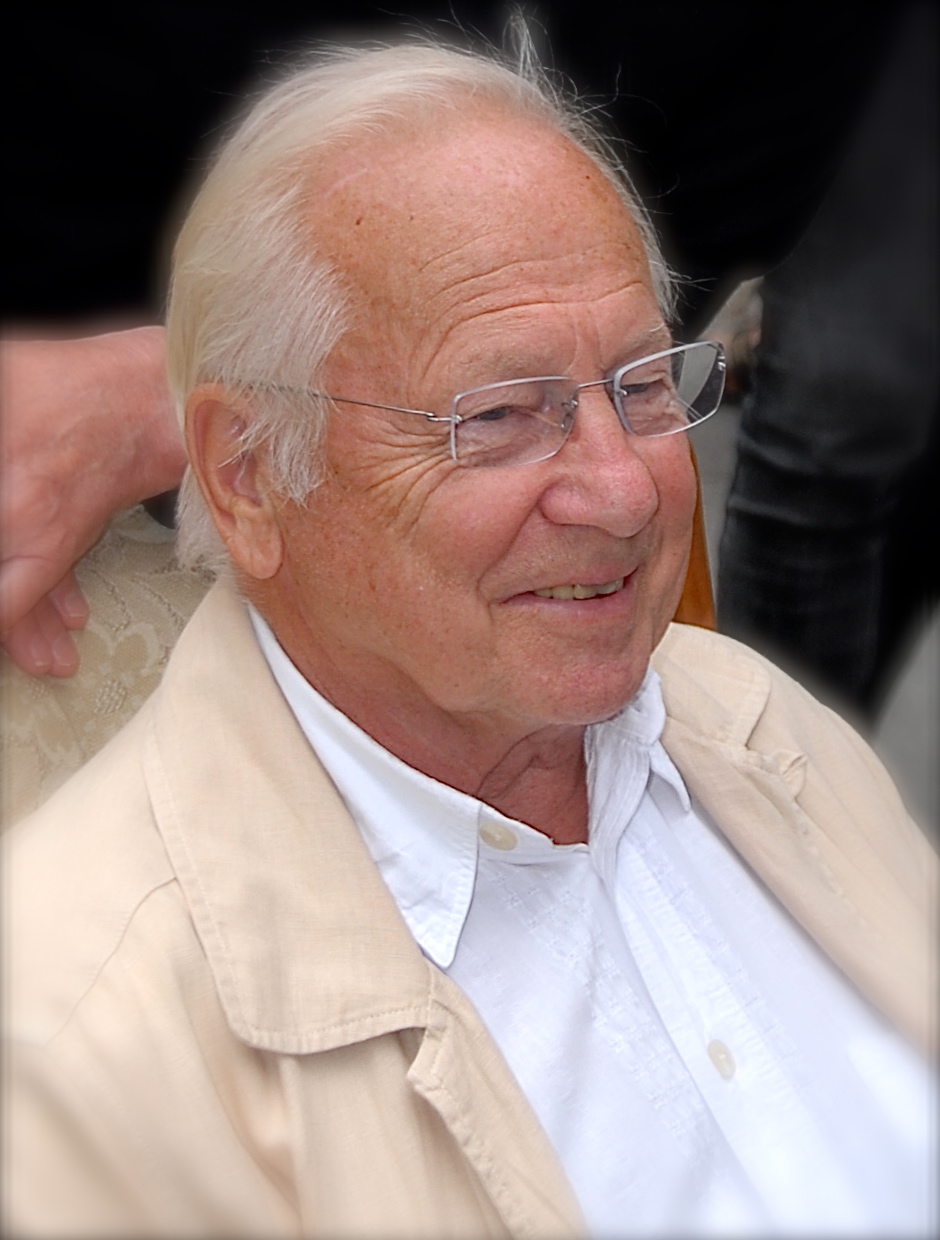
- Hirdwall in 2009
- Born: Lars Ingvar Eriksson; 5 December 1934; Stockholm, Sweden
- Died: 6 April 2023 (aged 88)
- Occupation: Actor
- Years active: 1950–2023
- Spouse: Marika Lindström (m. 1975)
- Children: Jacob Hirdwall; Agnes Hirdwall

Lars Ingvar Hirdwall (5 December 1934 – 6 April 2023) was a Swedish actor. In Sweden he is best known for his role in the Martin Beck film series; internationally he was perhaps best known for his role as the lawyer Dirch Frode in the Millennium films.

== Characters ==
One of the country's most prolific stage and film actors, he is probably most widely recognised for his two heterogeneous roles in the Martin Beck universe; as the eponymous killer in Bo Widerberg's The Man on the Roof in 1976, and the recurrent role as "The Neighbor" in the mass produced film series, a rambunctious raconteur who frequently interacts with the titular police investigator for the purpose of comic relief. He also had a role in the film adaptation of Stieg Larsson's Millennium series as the lawyer Dirch Frode, and starred as various colourful characters in Lars Molin's comedies.

== Career ==
Hirdwall was born in Stockholm, and was educated at Gothenburg City Theatre stage school 1957–1960. Since the early 1960s he has been active as an actor in many films and TV series and on theatrical stages, mainly the Stockholm City Theatre. He also worked at Oscarsteatern, with productions like West Side Story. As well as Chinateatern, with the play "Revisorn" alongside his Beck-lead Peter Haber. He is well known in Sweden, often portraying obstinate or strange characters. His most well-recognised role in his closing decades was as the eccentric “The Neighbor”, a rambunctious raconteur living next to the eponymous homicide investigator Martin Beck and often providing comic relief, and occasionally (unintentionally) vital insights, in the many Martin Beck TV movies made from 1997 into the 2020s. He was also often in director Lars Molin's productions. In December 1993, Hirdwall played the leading role in the Swedish TV company SVT's annual children's Christmas "Advent calendar" – Tomtemaskinen (The mechanical Santa), one of the Pettson and Findus stories by Sven Nordqvist – with one 15-minute part shown each day until Christmas Eve. Hirdwall played the character of Pettson.

Hirdwall received the Swedish Guldbagge Award for Best Actor at the 17th Guldbagge Awards for Barnens ö (Children's Island) and the Thaliapriset prize in 1993.

His last film role was "The Neighbour" in the film "Beck – Deadlock", which was released to the TV4 streaming service C More on 22 July 2023.

== Family and death ==
Hirdwall was married to the actress Marika Lindström. They had two children, director Jacob Hirdwall and actress Agnes Hirdwall.

Hirdwall died on 6 April 2023, from an act of suicide, at age 88.

== Selected filmography ==
- Min kära är en ros (1963) – Pajen
- Raven's End (1963) – Sixten
- För vänskaps skull (1965) – Jens Mattsson
- The Man on the Roof (1976) – Åke Eriksson
- Hedebyborna (1978, TV Series) – Skomakar-Ludde
- Nattvandraren (1980, TV Movie)
- Children's Island (1980) – Stig Utler
- Jackpot (1980)
- Babels hus (1981, TV Mini-Series) – Bernt Svensson
- Som enda närvarande (1981, TV Short) – Kevin
- Drottning Kristina (1981, TV Mini-Series) – Axel Oxenstierna
- Berget på månens baksida (1983) – Gustaf Edgren
- Midvinterduell (1983, TV Movie) – Egon
- The Man from Majorca (1984) – Fors
- August Strindberg: ett liv (1985, TV Mini-Series) – Läraren / Murveln
- Fläskfarmen (1986, TV Movie) – Monty
- Kunglig toilette (1986, TV Movie) – Restaurateur
- Miraklet i Valby (1989) – Petra's Father
- 1939) (1989) – Annika's Father
- Tre kärlekar (1989–1991, TV Series) – Egon Nilsson
- Kejsarn av Portugallien (1992–1993, TV Mini-Series) – Jan
- Tomtemaskinen (1993, TV Series) – Pettson
- Pensionat Oskar (1995) – Strange Man
- Potatishandlaren (1996, TV Movie) – Johansson
- Juloratoriet (1996) – Edman
- Torntuppen (1996, TV Mini-Series) – Johan From
- En kvinnas huvud (1997) – Düber
- Emma åklagare (1997, TV Series) – Ivan Josefsson
- Beck (1997–2020, TV Series) – Grannen
- Den tatuerade änkan (1998, TV Movie) – Egon Andersson
- Ivar Kreuger (1999, TV Mini-Series) – Statsminister Ekman
- Miffo (2003) – Karl Henrik
- Mamma pappa barn (2003) – Roland
- Om jag vänder mig om (2003) – Knut
- Mouth to Mouth (2005) – Mats pappa John
- Möbelhandlarens dotter (2006, TV Mini-Series) – Paul Martinsson d ä
- Offside (2006) – Boston
- Den enskilde medborgaren (2006) – Gunnar Bergström
- Stormen (2009, TV Mini-Series) – Bernt
- The Girl with the Dragon Tattoo (2009) – Dirch Frode
- Miraklet i Viskan (2015) – Halvar
