= Peter Haber =

Swedish actor

- Born: Peter Alexander Haber; 12 December 1952 (age 73); Stockholm, Sweden
- Occupation: Actor
- Years active: 1987–present
- Known for: Sthlm boogie
- Partner(s): Anne-Li Norberg (1980s); Lena T. Hansson (1990–present)
- Children: Nina (born 1985); Viktor (born 1995)

Peter Alexander Haber (born 12 December 1952) is a Swedish actor. His father was German, his mother Swedish. He grew up in Skåne, Sweden, and in Remscheid, Germany. In 1987 he was hired by the Stockholm City Theatre where he was active until 1994. At the 29th Guldbagge Awards, he was nominated for the Best Actor award for his role in Sune's Summer.

The most famous roles that Haber has played are the father Rudolf in the series Sune, Carl Hamilton in Fiendens fiende (Enemy's Enemy) and Martin Beck from 1997 onwards in the eponymous film series. He is also known for his role in the 2009 film The Girl with the Dragon Tattoo. Haber is in a relationship with actress Lena T. Hansson.

== Partial filmography ==
- 1987: Nionde kompaniet - Lundkvist
- 1988: Venus 90 - Photographer
- 1989: 1939 - Police Assistant Wiren
- 1990-1991: My Enemy's Enemy (TV Mini-Series) - Hamilton
- 1991: Harry Lund' lägger näsan i blöt! - Rune 'Ebba' Ek
- 1991: Freud Leaving Home - Man at the airplane
- 1991: Sunes jul (TV Series) - Rudolf Andersson
- 1992: Jönssonligan och den svarta diamanten (The Johnson-gang and the black diamond) - Doktorn
- 1993: Sune's Summer - Rudolf Andersson
- 1995: White Lies - Palle Hagmann
- 1995: Jönssonligans största kupp (The Johnson-gang's greatest robbery) - Doktorn
- 1996: Vinterviken - Frank, Elisabeth's father
- 1996: Juloratoriet - Aron Nordensson
- 1997: Slutspel - Nalle
- 1997-2025: Beck (TV Series) - Martin Beck
- 1999: Vägen ut (The Way Out) - Jakobsson
- 1999: Tomten är far till alla barnen (In Bed with Santa) - Janne
- 2000: Hur som helst är han jävligt död - Rolf
- 2000: Gossip - Gregor Becklén
- 2001: En förälskelse - Simon
- 2002: Shrek (Swedish) - Lord Farquaad (voice)
- 2004: Hotet (The Threat) - Rosin
- 2006: Små mirakel och stora - Per
- 2006: Göta kanal 2 – Kanalkampen - Grävmaskinist
- 2009: Män som hatar kvinnor (Men Who Hate Women) - Martin Vanger
- 2009: Crash Point: Berlin (Germany, TV Movie) - Michael Winkler
- 2011-2012: Gustafsson 3 tr (TV Series) - Roger
- 2014: Bamse and the City of Thieves - Bamse (voice)
- 2014: A Second Chance - Gustav
- 2016: Bamse and the Witch's Daughter - Bamse (voice)
- 2018: Halvdan Viking - Björn
- 2018: Bamse och dunderklockan - Bamse (voice)
- 2019: Britt-Marie var här - Kent
