= The Abominable Man =

1971 novel by Maj Sjöwall and Per Wahlöö

- First edition (Swedish)
- Author: Maj Sjöwall and Per Wahlöö
- Original title: Den vedervärdige mannen från Säffle
- Language: Swedish
- Series: Martin Beck series
- Publisher: Norstedts Förlag (Sweden); Pantheon Books (US)
- Publication date: 1971
- Publication place: Sweden
- English publication date: 1972
- Pages: 194
- ISBN: 91-1-715611-4
- OCLC: 13383505
- LC Class: PT9876.29.J63 V4
- Preceded by: Murder at the Savoy
- Followed by: The Locked Room

The Abominable Man (Swedish: Den vedervärdige mannen från Säffle, meaning "The abominable man from Säffle") is a 1971 police procedural novel by Swedish writers Maj Sjöwall and Per Wahlöö. It is the seventh book in their series about Martin Beck. The plot follows Martin Beck and his colleagues trying to solve a murder of a senior policeman, known for his brutality against others. While the investigation is ongoing, a well armed man climbs up on a roof in Stockholm.

One of Donald Knuth's favourite novels, he described it as "one of Sjöwall and Wahlöö's brilliantly Swedish detective novels".

== Plot ==
A senior policeman known for brutality is violently knifed while in his hospital bed (in Sabbatsberg Hospital). Within a 24-hour period, Martin Beck investigates the policeman's many enemies in an attempt to identify the killer, for whom the murder was only a precursor to a Charles Whitman-style attack on Stockholm.

Since they cannot find a starting clue, the police go in the archives of the police ombudsman where they find many old complaints about Nyman. They encounter the entry of their former colleague Åke Eriksson; Eriksson's wife was in diabetic coma but she was considered drunk by Nyman and locked in the drunk cell, where she died. Finally, on the roof of a skyscraper in downtown Stockholm, it comes to a showdown with Eriksson, who has lost everything, at which point the novel ends with Martin Beck seriously injured by a gunshot.

== Characters and their development ==
Martin Beck and his now grown-up daughter Ingrid develop their friendship; they eat out together. Police officer Kurt Kvant is killed in this book by the crazed killer on the roof.

== Film adaptation ==
The book was adapted to film in 1976 and directed by Bo Widerberg. It was renamed The Man on the Roof (Swedish: Mannen på Taket), and stars Carl-Gustaf Lindstedt, Sven Wollter, Thomas Hellberg and Håkan Serner. It was awarded with two Guldbagge Awards.

Preceded by Murder at the Savoy	"Martin Beck" timeline, part 7 of 10	Succeeded by The Locked Room
