= The Terrorists =

Novel by Sjöwall and Wahlöö

- First Swedish edition
- Author: Maj Sjöwall and Per Wahlöö
- Original title: Terroristerna
- Language: Swedish
- Series: Martin Beck series
- Publisher: Norstedts Förlag
- Publication date: 1975
- Publication place: Sweden
- Preceded by: Cop Killer

The Terrorists (Swedish: Terroristerna) is a crime novel by Swedish writers Maj Sjöwall and Per Wahlöö; it is the final book in their 10-part detective series revolving around Martin Beck and his team. The Terrorists was unfinished at the time of Per Wahlöö's death in June 1975; the last few chapters were completed by Maj Sjöwall alone.

== Plot summary ==
The story opens with a trial where an eighteen-year-old woman is accused of a bank robbery she never intended to commit. Later, a pornographic film producer is found murdered at the home of his mistress. The main plot of the book involves Martin Beck leading a team of policemen to prevent a presumed terrorist attack on a highly unpopular American senator who is paying an official visit to Sweden. The attack is led by terrorist Reinhard Heydt, born to a Danish mother in Pietermaritzburg, South Africa, part of the (fictitious) international terrorist organization Ulag which has already carried out several exceedingly brutal attacks successfully.

Beck is appointed head of the protection unit for the state visit and to plan the distance protection with four colleagues. They assume that the attack on a place will mean that the convoy must pass, perpetrated presumably in the same pattern as in a previous assassination by Ulag in a Latin American country.

The four terrorists in Ulag manage to place the bomb. However, they are deceived by a delayed television coverage when triggering the ignition and Einar Ronn, one of four commissioners to Beck manages to clear the square shortly before the explosion.

The situation already seems to be under control, but shortly afterwards there is a shot, but the victim is not the US Senator, but the Swedish Prime Minister. The perpetrator is the eighteen-year-old woman from the bank robbery storyline.

Two of the four terrorists are taken by surprise and arrested by the police in their hiding place. The third, Levallois has fled. The police seals off all roads across national borders. As the fourth terrorist Heydt encounters the police, there is an exchange of fire in which Heydt is killed and a policeman is injured. The story, and indeed the series, ends with the policemen being able to go home to spend Christmas with their families, with the book ending with Beck, happily partnered with Rhea, his girlfriend, enjoying New Year festivities with Kollberg and Gun, Kollberg's wife. The concluding chapter ends with the foursome playing a word game. Kollberg draws an "x" and emphases "x as in ex-policeman." Starting a new game he again draws an "x" and says, ending the story, "x as in Marx".

== Characters ==
Lennart Kollberg has resigned from the force and plays only a minor role in this book. His absence is mostly compensated by a more important role for Gunvald Larsson, foreshadowing his central role in the later, separate-continuity TV movies; likewise, Einar Rönn is also more prominently featured. In this last Sjöwall and Wahlöö book, Martin Beck finally admits to himself that he actually likes working with Larsson, although he misses Kollberg.

The presumed target of the terrorist, the US Senator allegedly inspired by Barry Goldwater, connects to the current pro-Vietnam sentiments in Sweden and the Western world. A previous victim of Heydt's group, Ulag, invokes the assassination of Luis Carrero Blanco in 1973, but here set in an unnamed Caribbean setting.

Theobald Braxén, a defense attorney, is introduced as a rather comical and sympathetic character who loves taking up apparently hopeless cases. His antagonist in court is Sten "Bulldozer" Olsson, first introduced in The Locked Room.

== Film adaptation ==
In 1994 the novel was adapted for film under the title Stockholm Marathon, with its plot much altered. In the film, the intended victim is a man running the Stockholm Marathon and the motive is revenge. The film was directed by Peter Keglevic and Gösta Ekman played the role as Martin Beck.

== Sources ==
- Maj Sjöwall and Per Wahlöö (1975), trans. Joan Tate, The Terrorists, 1978 reprint, New York: Vintage, ISBN 0-394-72452-6.

Preceded by Cop Killer	"Martin Beck" timeline, part 10 of 10	Succeeded by none
