= Roseanna (1967 film) =

1967 Swedish detective film

- Directed by: Hans Abramson
- Screenplay by: Hans Abramson
- Based on: Roseanna by Sjöwall and Wahlöö
- Starring: Keve Hjelm
- Cinematography: Sven Nykvist
- Release date: 14 August 1967 (Sweden)
- Running time: 104 minutes
- Country: Sweden
- Language: Swedish

Roseanna is a 1967 Swedish detective film directed by Hans Abramson. It is based on the 1965 novel Roseanna by Swedish writers Maj Sjöwall and Per Wahlöö about fictional Swedish police detective Martin Beck.

== Plot ==
When a dead and unknown woman is found in a canal, the case arrives on the desk of police inspector Martin Beck. When the woman is identified, the police reconstruct the woman's final day - a trip on the canal boat "Wilhelm Thams".

== Cast ==
- Keve Hjelm as Martin Beck
- Hans Ernback as Folke Bengtsson
- Tor Isedal as Gunnar Ahlberg
- Gio Petré as Roseanna McGraw
- Kerstin Tidelius as Sonja Hansson
- Diane Varsi as Mary Jane Peterson
- Michael Tolan as Elmer B. Kafka
- Braulio Castillo as Edgar Castillo
- Hans Bendrik as Kollberg
- Rolf Larsson as Karl-Åke Eriksson-Stolt
- Leif Liljeroth as Stenström
- Mona Malm as Siv Lundberg
- Jan Erik Lindqvist as Melander
- Ann-Mari Adamsson as Martin Beck's wife
- Monica Strömmerstedt as the woman at the service station
