= Cop Killer (novel) =

1973 novel by Maj Sjöwall and Per Wahlöö

- Swedish edition
- Author: Maj Sjöwall and Per Wahlöö
- Original title: Polismördaren
- Language: Swedish
- Series: Martin Beck series
- Publisher: Norstedts Förlag (Sweden); Pantheon Books (US); Victor Gollancz (UK)
- Publication date: 1973
- Publication place: Sweden
- English publication date: 1975
- Pages: 285
- ISBN: 91-1-742201-9
- OCLC: 9759090
- LC Class: PT9876.29.J63 P63
- Preceded by: The Locked Room
- Followed by: The Terrorists

Cop Killer (original Swedish title: Polismördaren) is a crime novel by Swedish writers Maj Sjöwall and Per Wahlöö, published in 1973. It is part of their detective series revolving around Martin Beck and his team.

== Plot summary ==
A woman disappears from the small town of Anderslöv in Scania, Sweden. Since her neighbor Folke Bengtsson has an earlier conviction for the murder of an American tourist named Roseanna McGraw, he is naturally suspected of having a connection to the woman's disappearance. Homicide investigator with the Swedish Police, Martin Beck, is put on the case. He begins his investigation by looking into the previous murder of Roseanna, and the man he himself got convicted of it. After some time the disappeared woman's body is found dead in a wallow, and Folke is charged with murder and taken into custody by the police. Shortly after this a police squad is involved in a shoot-out with two teenage burglars and a police man is badly injured. One of the teenagers survive the shooting and disappears from the scene. Beck's colleague Malm gets to investigate the police shooting and search for the survivor. The wounded policeman dies and the investigation becomes one regarding homicide/manslaughter. The survivor is tracked to Stockholm, and it turns out he has fled in a car that is connected to the murdered woman found in the wallow - it appears the car is owned by the real murderer.

== Characters ==
Folke Bengtsson, the killer from the first Sjöwall and Wahlöö novel Roseanna, returns as a suspect of the murder of the woman.

Hergott Nöjd is introduced as a character with a particularly appealing dry sort of humor. He and Martin Beck develop a friendship during the investigations. Nöjd returns in the next Sjöwall and Wahlöö book, The Terrorists.

Lennart Kollberg resigns from the police force by the end of this book.

== Film adaptation ==
The novel was used as the basis for a 1994 Swedish-German film, directed by Peter Keglevic. Titled Polismördaren in Sweden, it is known as The Police Murderer in the United States. Gösta Ekman played the role as Martin Beck.

Preceded by The Locked Room	"Martin Beck" timeline, part 9 of 10	Succeeded by The Terrorists
