= Moustache cup =

Drinking cup with a semicircular ledge inside

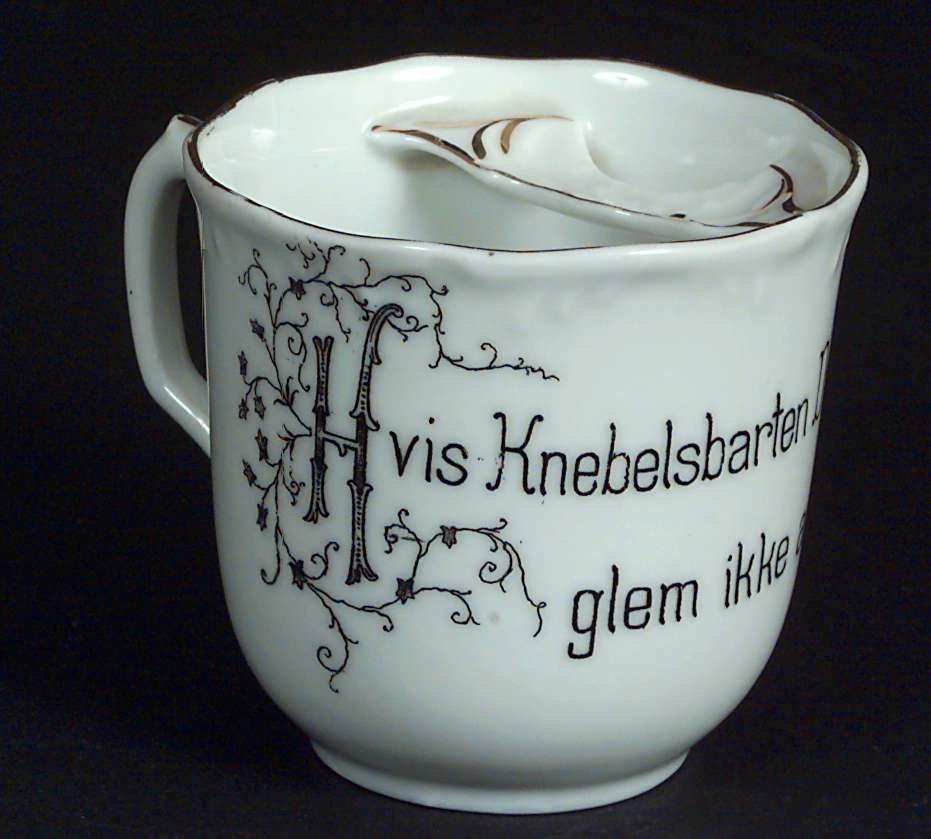
A moustache cup in the Norsk Folkemuseum, Oslo, with inscription saying (in Norwegian) "If the mustache you want to keep straight, / don't forget to use me"

The moustache cup (or mustache cup) is a drinking cup with a semicircular ledge inside. The ledge, called a moustache guard, has a half moon-shaped opening to allow the passage of liquids and serves as a guard to keep moustaches dry. It is generally acknowledged to have been invented in the 1870s by British potter Harvey Adams (born 1835).

== Historic context ==
Moustaches flourished throughout the Victorian era, and by the early twentieth century, the British Army required soldiers to grow a moustache. Often, moustache wax was applied to the moustache to keep it stiff, with every hair in place. When drinking hot liquids, steam from the drink would melt the wax, which would drip into the cup. Sipping hot tea or coffee would also often stain moustaches.

== Production ==
The new invention spread all over the European continent and soon, every famous potter was making the new cups. A multiplicity of moustache cups were made by famous manufactories such as Meissen, Royal Crown Derby, Imari, Royal Bayreuth, Limoges and others. Each potter created his own version of this masculine tableware and the news of that invention soon spread to America.

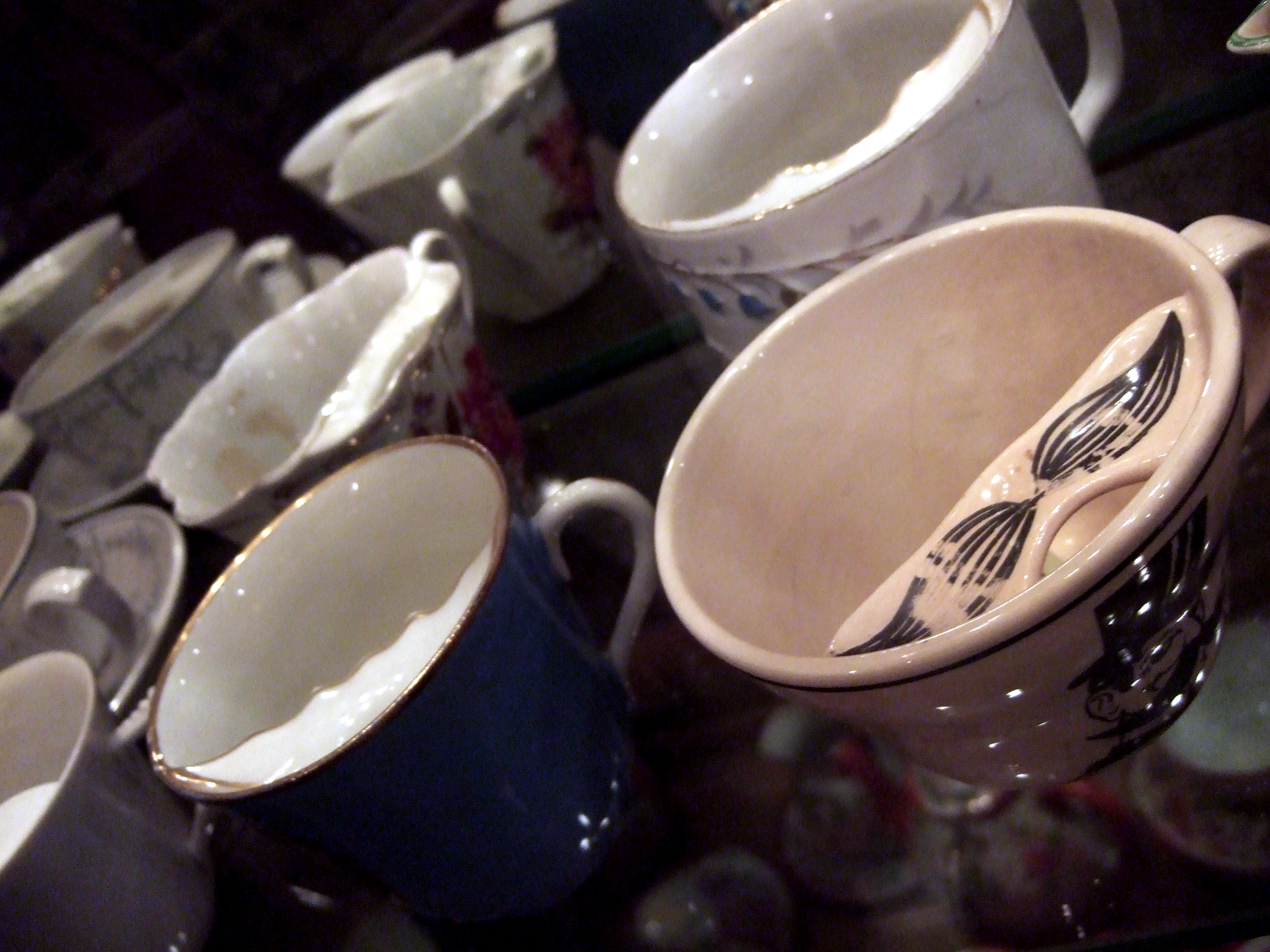
A collection of cups from the tea museum at Mariage Freres, Paris

Although many moustache cups were made in America, the earliest were marked with names which led buyers to believe they were actually manufactured in England. This was due to the popularity of English-made ceramics. Therefore, with the exception of the quadruple silverplate moustache cups made in the U.S., it is nowadays extremely difficult to find an authentic Victorian moustache cup bearing an American pottery mark.

== Decline and resurgence ==
Between 1920 and 1930, moustaches progressively began to go out of fashion; hence, moustache cup production fell. Today, though, these examples of Victorian male elegance are coveted and collected by a growing number of enthusiasts.

Moustache cups are becoming highly collectible as their popularity has increased in recent years due to a resurgence of men's facial hair styles, particularly ones calling for moustache wax.

== In popular culture ==
In James Joyce's novel Ulysses, Leopold Bloom drinks his tea from a moustache cup he received from his daughter Milly for his twenty-seventh birthday.

In the opening scene of the 1931 short comedy film Be Big!, Oliver Hardy, while packing for a trip to Atlantic City, coyly asks his wife if she packed his moustache cup.

In Episode 15 of Season 4 of the television series The Andy Griffith Show, Aunt Bee receives one as a gift from a local farmer, Mr. Frisby.

In Margaret Mitchell’s novel Gone With the Wind, Scarlett O'Hara thinks of the painted China moustache cups she made for the bazaar.

In Thomas Pynchon's 2009 novel Inherent Vice, protagonist Doc Sportello buys Wyatt Earp's personal mustache cup, which he suspects is a fake but later proves to be authentic.

In the Martin Beck novel, The Man Who Went Up in Smoke, by Maj Sjöwall and Per Wahlöö, a minor character sporting a full beard and moustasche ruefully comments, "They ought to serve beer in mustache cups."

In the Japanese manga "Cat and Gentleman's Tearoom," the mustachioed protagonist, Sizuka Taki, favors a Moustache cup.

== See also ==
- Fuddling cup
- Noggin (cup)
- Plastic cup
- Pythagorean cup
