= The Man on the Roof =

1976 film

- Swedish DVD cover
- Swedish: Mannen på taket
- Directed by: Bo Widerberg
- Screenplay by: Bo Widerberg
- Based on: The Abominable Man by Maj Sjöwall and Per Wahlöö
- Produced by: Per Berglund
- Starring: Carl-Gustaf Lindstedt; Sven Wollter; Thomas Hellberg; Håkan Serner
- Cinematography: Odd Geir Sæther; Per Källberg
- Edited by: Sylvia Ingemarsson; Bo Widerberg
- Music by: Björn J:son Lindh
- Production companies: SF Studios, Swedish Film Institute, Bo Widerberg Film AB
- Distributed by: SF Studios, Swedish Film Institute
- Release date: 1 October 1976 (Sweden)
- Running time: 110 minutes
- Country: Sweden
- Language: Swedish
- Budget: 4 million SEK
- Box office: 11.5 million SEK

The Man on the Roof (Swedish: Mannen på taket) is a 1976 Swedish police procedural-thriller film directed by Bo Widerberg. It is based on the 1971 novel The Abominable Man by Maj Sjöwall and Per Wahlöö. The film stars Carl-Gustaf Lindstedt, Sven Wollter, Thomas Hellberg and Håkan Serner.

Widerberg's direction was inspired by the 1971 American film The French Connection, and Widerberg would make one more crime film in 1984: The Man from Majorca.

The film won two Guldbagge Awards in 1977, for Best Film and Best Actor (Håkan Serner).

== Plot ==
A veteran Swedish policeman named Stig Nyman is brutally murdered, bludgeoned and eviscerated with a bayonet while being treated for a secret illness at a Stockholm hospital. The investigation that follows is led by pragmatic veteran Martin Beck and uninspiring detective Einar Rönn. It turns out that the murdered man was known among colleagues for abusing his police privileges and brutalizing civilians. Although his colleagues generally disliked Nyman and had been aware of his behavior, the police force's esprit de corps had suppressed complaints about him and prevented any reprisals.

The investigation proceeds, and finally Beck and his team find a trail that leads to the murderer, who turns out to be an ex-policeman named Eriksson. Eriksson's wife Marja had diabetes and went out to buy insulin before passing out from her illness; Nyman found her unconscious on the street and instead of bringing in medical treatment, had her arrested for public intoxication and placed in a holding cell. She fell into a coma and died, and Eriksson blamed the police for the tragedy. Now, some years later, he has become a social misfit and the authorities are in the process of removing his daughter Malin from his custody.

As Beck and his team close in on Eriksson he climbs up on the roof of the apartment building where he lives in central Stockholm, bringing with him both an automatic rifle and a sharpshooter's rifle. He starts to fire at any policeman and police vehicle he can spot, killing one uniformed officer and seriously wounding another. The two cops who are in the middle of Eriksson's rampage are Dets. Kollberg (a married husband who has a progressive approach to his job) and Larsson (a macho hothead who doesn't like Kollberg specifically or the top Stockholm PD brass in general but who is a tough and smart cop). Larsson suffers a non-fatal wound from shrapnel hit by one of Eriksson's shots, and they get out of the area by disguising themselves as doctors.

When the police commissioner decides to bring in the anti-terrorist units, including two police helicopters, Eriksson shoots up one of the helicopters such that it crashes on a crowded plaza, Odenplan, near the building where he resides. Beck tries an individual initiative, climbing to the roof on a flimsy external ladder, but is shot in the chest, left severely injured and bleeding on a ledge leading to the roof until Kollberg bravely rescues him and gets him to a safe apartment along the building's facade. A group that includes Larsson, Hult (a stone-faced officer who was one of the few members of the force who was close friends to Nyman, and who resolves to avenge his death), special operations soldiers and a civilian volunteer with his own firearms on hand use explosives to blast to the roof where Eriksson is hiding. He stops them and is about to shoot Larsson when the civilian fires a shot that slams into Eriksson's shoulder and leaves him disabled. Hult rages towards Eriksson but only hits him once in the face before he's pulled away by other officers who arrest the sniper. Larsson tells the civilian he let him take the shot because a cop shooting another cop would be a whole other problem set, and bluntly says the civilian will have to answer questions about the unlicensed gun he had on hand. Eriksson is left staring into the sky as the movie ends.

== Cast ==
- Carl-Gustaf Lindstedt as Martin Beck: Detective Inspector (Kriminalkommissarie)
- Sven Wollter as Lennart Kollberg: Criminal police (Kriminalpolis)
- Thomas Hellberg as Gunvald Larsson: Criminal police
- Håkan Serner as Einar Rönn: Criminal police
- Ingvar Hirdwall as Åke "The Man on the Roof" Eriksson
- Bellan Roos as Mrs. Eriksson: Eriksson's mother
- Gus Dahlström as Mr. Eriksson: Eriksson's father
- Hadar Johansson as Stig Nyman
- Harald Hamrell as Stefan Nyman: Stig Nyman's son
- Birgitta Valberg as Mrs. Nyman
- Carl-Axel Heiknert as Palmon Harald Hult: First police constable (Förste polisassistent)
- Torgny Anderberg as Stig Åke Malm: Chief Superintendent (Polisintendent)
- Folke Hjort as Fredrik Melander: Criminal police
- Eva Remaeus as Mrs. Kollberg
- Gunnel Wadner as Mrs. Beck

== Production ==
The actor Carl-Gustaf Lindstedt was picked for the part as the policeman Beck after Wideberg had seen him with a serious face in a talk show not knowing he was on air. Previously, Lindstedt was mostly known for roles in comedy films.

Filming took place between 11 December 1975 and 30 April 1976, using a budget of 3.9 million SEK. Bo Widerberg didn't like the fake theater blood so pigs blood was used.

== Reception ==
The critics were very positive and especially praised the dialogue. Around 750,000 people attended the film in Sweden, making it the most successful film produced by the Swedish Film Institute until Fanny and Alexander was released in 1982. The film was selected as the Swedish entry for the Best Foreign Language Film at the 50th Academy Awards, but was not nominated.

Awards and achievements
Preceded by Release the Prisoners to Spring	Guldbagge Awards for Best Film; 1976/77	Succeeded by The Adventures of Picasso
Preceded by City of My Dreams	Guldbagge Awards for Swedish submissions for the Academy Award for Best Foreign Language Film; 1977	Succeeded by A Respectable Life
