= The Man on the Balcony =

1967 novel by Maj Sjöwall and Per Wahlöö

- First edition (Swedish)
- Author: Maj Sjöwall and Per Wahlöö
- Original title: Mannen på balkongen
- Language: Swedish
- Series: Martin Beck series
- Publisher: Norstedts Förlag (Swedish); Pantheon Books (English)
- Publication date: 1967
- Publication place: Sweden
- English publication date: 1968
- Pages: 199
- Preceded by: The Man Who Went Up in Smoke
- Followed by: The Laughing Policeman

The Man on the Balcony is a mystery novel by Swedish writers Maj Sjöwall and Per Wahlöö, originally published as Mannen på balkongen in 1967. It is the third novel in the detective series revolving around Swedish police detective Martin Beck.

In the novel, Martin Beck and his team realize that a paedophilic murderer may have been seen by an unidentified serial robber on the lookout for a victim in the same area. The pressure increases when more child murders begin to occur.

== Plot summary ==
At the beginning of the book Beck goes on a peaceful mission with colleague Ahlberg in Motala. His other colleagues, meanwhile, are looking for a handbag thief who is making the parks of Stockholm unsafe. In the park where the latest robbery occurred, a child's body is discovered by two tramps shortly after the crime. The 9-year-old girl has been abused and strangled. Shortly thereafter, the same fate befalls another child. As Beck returns, the police investigation is already underway.

The police are initially lacking in clues as the abduction of the second girl was only witnessed by a three-year-old boy. An elderly exhibitionist is briefly detained, but is found to have nothing to do with the murders.

Only a coincidence advances the investigation: Gunvald Larsson (making his first appearance in this novel) had a telephone call at the very beginning of the investigation with an elderly lady who complained about a man in an opposite flat, standing all day on his balcony, looking at the road, and playing with the children, among other strange behavior. After Martin Beck remembers this call; with difficulty the note written by Larsson is found and by a mixture of obstinate investigating and the coincidence that the caller had the common name Andersson, the killer is found, just before he can attack a child again.

== Characters ==
The boorish detective Gunvald Larsson is introduced, as is Einar Rönn, who comes from a rural part of the country and prefers a quiet life. Larsson was Sjöwall's favourite character, whereas Rönn was Wahlöö's. Also introduced are two regular street cops, Kristiansson and Kvant, who will provide some of the comic relief throughout the rest of the series.

== Film adaptation ==
On 26 November 1993 the film with the same name premiered in Sweden. It starred Gösta Ekman as Martin Beck and Rolf Lassgård as Gunvald Larsson. The film was a great success and won the Swedish Guldbagge Award for Best Actor (Gösta Ekman), Best Screenplay (Daniel Alfredson & Jonas Cornell) and Best Film (Hans Lönnerheden, producer).

Preceded by The Man Who Went Up in Smoke	"Martin Beck" timeline, part 3 of 10	Succeeded by The Laughing Policeman
