= The Laughing Policeman =

The Laughing Policeman may refer to:

- "The Laughing Policeman" (song), a 1920s music-hall song by Charles Jolly (Charles Penrose)
- The Laughing Policeman (novel), a 1968 detective novel by Maj Sjöwall and Per Wahlöö
- The Laughing Policeman (film), a 1973 film based on the 1968 novel
- The Laughing Policeman, a 1970s British children's television series starring Deryck Guyler
