= Spill. En damroman =

Book by Sigrid Combüchen

- First edition
- Author: Sigrid Combüchen
- Language: Swedish
- Published: 2010
- Publisher: Norstedts förlag
- Publication place: Sweden
- Awards: August Prize of 2010

Spill. En damroman (lit. Spill. A Lady's Novel) is a 2010 novel by Swedish author Sigrid Combüchen. It won the August Prize in 2010.
