= Police procedural =

Subgenre of detective fiction

The police procedural, police show, or police crime drama is a subgenre of procedural drama and detective fiction that emphasises accurate depiction of the investigative procedure of police officers, police detectives, or law enforcement agencies as the protagonists, as contrasted with other genres that focus on non-police investigators such as private investigators (PIs).

Many mysteries that feature a policeman as the protagonist—for example, Earl Derr Biggers's novels featuring Honolulu Police detective Charlie Chan, Ngaio Marsh's novels and short stories about Roderick Alleyn of Scotland Yard, and the TV series Columbo—are not meant as authentic depictions of the law enforcement profession, but are merely giving the protagonists an official position so that they have a "franchise," so to speak, from which to work.

As its name implies, the defining element of a police procedural is the attempt to accurately depict law enforcement and its procedures, including police-related topics such as forensic science, autopsies, gathering evidence, search warrants, interrogation, and adherence to legal restrictions and procedures.

While many police procedurals conceal the criminal's identity until the crime is solved in the narrative climax (the so-called whodunit), others reveal the perpetrator's identity to the audience early in the narrative, making it an inverted detective story.

The police procedural genre has faced criticism for its inaccurate depictions of policing and crime, depictions of racism and sexism, and that the genre is "copaganda" that promotes a one-sided depiction of police as the "good guys".

== Early history ==
The roots of the police procedural have been traced to at least the mid-1880s. Wilkie Collins's novel The Moonstone (1868), a tale of a Scotland Yard detective investigating the theft of a valuable diamond, has been described as perhaps the earliest clear example of the genre.

Only after World War II would police procedural fiction rival the popularity of PIs or amateur sleuths.

In Japanese cinema, there was Akira Kurosawa's 1949 film Stray Dog, a serious police procedural film noir that was also a precursor to the buddy cop film genre.

Dragnet marked a turn in the depiction of the police on screen. Instead of being corrupt laughingstocks, this was the first time police officers represented bravery and heroism. In their quest for authenticity, Dragnet's producers used real police cars and officers in their scenes. However, this also meant that in exchange, the Los Angeles Police Department (LAPD) could vet scripts for authenticity. The LAPD vetted every scene, which would allow them to remove elements they did not agree with or did not wish to draw attention to.

As police procedurals became increasingly popular, they maintained this image of heroic police officers who are willing to bend the rules to save the day, as well as the use of police consultants. This would allow Hollywood to form a friendly relationship with law enforcement agencies who are also responsible for granting shooting permits.

== Written stories ==
=== French roman policier ===
French romans policiers (fr) value induction over deduction, synthesis of character over analysis of crime.

- 1866: Émile Gaboriau: Monsieur Lecoq
- 1905: Maurice Leblanc: Arsène Lupin
- 1908: Gaston Leroux: Joseph Rouletabille
- 1931: Georges Simenon: Inspector Maigret
- 1949: Frédéric Dard: "San-Antonio"

=== 1931: Georges Simenon ===
The Inspector Maigret novels of Georges Simenon feature a strong focus on the lead character, but the novels have always included subordinate members of his staff as supporting characters. Simenon, who had been a journalist covering police investigations before creating Maigret, gave the appearance of an accurate depiction of law enforcement in Paris. Simenon influenced later European procedural writers, such as Sweden's Maj Sjöwall and Per Wahlöö, and Baantjer.

=== 1952: Hillary Waugh ===
Hillary Waugh, in 1952, wrote Last Seen Wearing ..., a commercial and critical success, exploring detailed and relentless police work.

=== 1956: Ed McBain ===
As if to illustrate the universality of the police procedural, many of McBain's 87th Precinct novels, despite their being set in a slightly fictionalized New York City, have been filmed in settings outside New York, even outside the US. Akira Kurosawa's 1963 film, High and Low, based on McBain's King's Ransom (1959), is set in Yokohama. Without Apparent Motive (1972), set on the French Riviera, is based on McBain's Ten Plus One (1963). Claude Chabrol's Les Liens de Sang (1978), based on Blood Relatives (1974), is set in Montreal. Even Fuzz (1972), based on the 1968 novel, though set in the US, moves the action to Boston. Two episodes of ABC's Columbo, set in Los Angeles, were based on McBain novels.

=== 1965: Sjöwall and Wahlöö ===
Maj Sjöwall and Per Wahlöö planned and wrote the Martin Beck police procedural series of ten books between the 1960s and 1970s, set in Sweden. The series is particularly renowned for its extensive character development throughout the series. Beck himself is gradually promoted from detective in a newly nationalised Swedish police force to Chief Inspector of the National Murder Squad, and the realistic depiction, as well as criticism of the Swedish welfare state at the time whilst the tedium of the police procedural continues in the background, is something still widely used today, with authors such as Jo Nesbø and Stieg Larsson. The books gave rise to the Swedish noir scene, and The Laughing Policeman earned a "Best Novel" Edgar Award from the Mystery Writers of America in 1971. The books were translated from Swedish into 35 different languages, and have sold roughly ten million copies. Sjöwall and Wahlöö used black humour extensively in the series, and it is widely recognised as one of the finest police procedural series.

== Televised stories ==
=== TV creators ===
- Barbara Avedon, co-creator of Cagney & Lacey.
- Donald P. Bellisario, creator of NCIS, Magnum, P.I. and JAG
- Ann Biderman, creator of Southland.
- Steven Bochco, creator of Hill Street Blues, the experimental musical police procedural Cop Rock, the longer-lived NYPD Blue and short lived Brooklyn South.
- Jon Bokenkamp, creator of The Blacklist.
- Andy Breckman, creator of Monk.
- Shane Brennan, creator of NCIS: Los Angeles.
- Stephen J. Cannell, creator of Silk Stalkings, 21 Jump Street and The Commish.
- Barbara Corday, co-creator of Cagney & Lacey.
- Jeff Davis, creator of Criminal Minds.
- Robert Doherty, creator of Elementary.
- Tom Fontana, creator of Homicide: Life on the Street and The Beat.
- Steve Franks, creator of Psych.
- Leonard Freeman, creator and producer of Hawaii Five-O.
- Anna Fricke, developer of Walker.
- Bryan Fuller, creator of Hannibal.
- Gary Glasberg, creator of NCIS: New Orleans.
- Hart Hanson, creator of Bones.
- Alexi Hawley, creator of The Rookie.
- Bruno Heller, creator of The Mentalist.
- Martin Gero, creator of Blindspot.
- Dan Goor, co-creator of Brooklyn Nine-Nine.
- Robin Green and Mitchell Burgess, creator of Blue Bloods.
- Tim Kring, creator of Crossing Jordan.
- Richard Levinson, co-creator of Columbo.
- William Link, co-creator of Columbo.
- Barbara Machin, creator of Waking the Dead.
- Abby Mann, creator of Kojak.
- Andrew W. Marlowe, creator of Castle.
- Quinn Martin, producer of such shows as The Untouchables, The F.B.I. and The Streets of San Francisco.
- Troy Kennedy Martin, creator of Z-Cars, Softly, Softly and Softly, Softly: Task Force.
- Geoff McQueen, creator of The Bill.
- Jed Mercurio, creator of Line of Duty and Bodyguard.
- David Milch, co-creator of NYPD Blue.
- Christopher Murphey, creator of Body of Proof.
- Jonathan Nolan, creator of Person of Interest.
- Shawn Ryan, creator of The Shield.
- Michael Schur, co-creator of Brooklyn Nine-Nine.
- David Simon, co-creator of Homicide: Life on the Street and creator of The Wire.
- Hank Steinberg, creator of Without a Trace.
- Meredith Stiehm, creator of Cold Case.
- Joseph Wambaugh, creator of Police Story.
- Jack Webb, creator, producer, and principal actor in Dragnet, and co-creator of Adam-12.
- Dick Wolf, creator of the Law & Order franchise, Chicago franchise, FBI franchise, New York Undercover
- Anthony Yerkovich, creator of Miami Vice.
- Graham Yost, creator of Justified & Boomtown.
- Anthony E. Zuiker, creator of the CSI franchise.

=== TV series ===
==== Australia ====
For details see the PhD dissertation by Antony Stephenson (2019).

- Bellamy (Network Ten 1981)
- Bluey (Seven Network 1976–77)
- Blue Heelers (Seven Network 1994–2006) 510 episodes set in the fictional rural town of Mount Thomas, Victoria, was produced by Southern Star Entertainment for the Seven Network.
- City Homicide (Seven Network 2007–11) Set in Melbourne, Victoria. Follows the investigations of six detectives and their two superior officers in the homicide squad of the Victoria Police.
- Cop Shop (Seven Network, 1977–84)
- Division 4 (Nine Network 1969–75) made by Crawford Productions, ran on the Nine Network for 301 episodes.
- The Feds (Nine Network 1993–96)
- Homicide (Seven Network 1964–76) was an Australian police procedural television series made by Crawford Productions for the Seven Network. One of the first commercial TV series produced especially for Australian TV, and the first to depict the operations of a modern-day Australian police force, its historical significance in Australian television is analogous to the importance of Dragnet in the United States.
- The Link Men (Nine Network 1970)
- The Long Arm (Network Ten 1970)
- Matlock Police (Network Ten 1971–75) was set in a rural town and lasted 229 episodes.
- Murder Call (Nine Network 1997–99)
- Phoenix (ABC 1992–93)
- Police Rescue (ABC 1991–96)
- Rush (Network Ten 2008–11) follows the stories of a tactical police unit in Melbourne, Victoria.
- Skirts (TV series) (Seven Network 1990)
- Small Claims (Network Ten 2005–06)
- Solo One (Seven Network 1976) a short-lived spin-off from Matlock Police
- Special Squad (Network Ten 1984)
- Stingers (Nine Network 1998–2004)
- Water Rats (Nine Network 1996–2001) 177 episodes set in Sydney Harbour, New South Wales, focusing on the Sydney Water Police.
- White Collar Blue (Network Ten 2002–03)
- Wildside (ABC 1997–99)
- Young Lions (Nine Network 2002)

==== Canada ====
- Allegiance (Canadian TV series)
- Cracked (Canadian TV series)
- The Detail
- Flashpoint (TV series)
- Law & Order Toronto: Criminal Intent
- Rookie Blue

==== Philippines ====
- May Bukas Pa (ABS-CBN; 2009–2010)
- Pilyang Kerubin (GMA Network; 2010)
- Noah (ABS-CBN; 2010–2011)
- Ikaw ay Pag-Ibig (ABS-CBN; 2011–2012)
- Aso ni San Roque (GMA Network; 2012–2013)
- Kailangan Ko'y Ikaw (ABS-CBN; 2013)
- Ang Probinsyano (ABS-CBN; 2015–2022) – based on the 1997 film of the same name starring Fernando Poe, Jr.
- Flower of Evil (Kapamilya Channel; 2022) – based on the 2020 South Korean drama series of the same name.
- Mga Lihim ni Urduja (GMA Network; 2023)
- Jack and Jill sa Diamond Hills (TV5; 2023–2024)
- Walang Matigas na Pulis sa Matinik na Misis (GMA Network; 2023–2025) – based on the 1994 film of the same name.
- Pira-Pirasong Paraiso (TV5/Kapamilya Channel; 2023–2024)
- Black Rider (GMA Network; 2023–2024)
- Sanggang Dikit FR (GMA Network; 2025–2026)

== Criticism ==
=== Masculinity and racism ===
The police procedural is considered to be a male-dominant genre which very often portrays the masculine hero dedicated to the professional realm. The introduction of women as protagonists is commonly attributed to either adding sexual appeal, introducing gendered issues like investigating sex crimes, or delving into the personal relationships of the characters. It also often portrays rape myths, such as that rape is more often committed by strangers rather than a known acquaintance of the victim, that the majority of rape claims are false, and that rapes only happen to "bad girls".

The portrayal of the criminal justice system also under-represents issues of race and institutional racism. A report by Color of Change Hollywood and the USC Annenberg Norman Lear Center identified that in these shows there was a severe lack of portrayal of racial bias in the criminal procedure, discussion about criminal justice reform, and victims who are women of color. There is also little representation of people of color in the creation of these shows.

=== Biased narratives ===
The police procedural genre is becoming increasingly popular and has accounted for about 22% of all scripted shows on US broadcast network in the last 10 years. This prevalence implies that viewers are often facing TV series that place police officers at the center of the story, showing exclusively their vision of the world. This approach has been denounced as enforcing the idea that the life and views of policemen are more important than the ones of the communities being policed.

In police procedurals, police officers are more often than not presented as the "good guys" or even close to superhuman, leading to a potentially biased narrative. Illegal practices are often presented as a necessary decision made in the general interest. A report by Color of Change Hollywood and the USC Annenberg Norman Lear Center revealed that police procedural shows were normalizing unjust practices such as illegal searches, surveillance, coercion, intimidation, violence, abuse, and racism.

=== Misrepresentation of reality ===
Criticisms have been raised against the genre for its unrealistic depiction of crime. Particularly, police procedurals have been accused of possessing an unrealistic preoccupation with incidents such as homicide and terrorism. In the United States, plot points involving murder investigations appear at more frequent rates than those involving theft, substance abuse, or domestic violence, which citizens are more likely to personally experience. Police procedurals have additionally portrayed attempted terrorism incidents at unrealistically high rates since the September 11 attacks and the start of the war on terror, prompting accusations of racial profiling and fear-mongering.

The manner in which crime has been portrayed in the media has subsequently been linked with discrepancies both in popular perception of crime rates, as well as sentencing. In a 2005 study conducted on the German public, it was found that despite a decline in total offences between 1992 and 2003, "the German public believes or assumes, on balance, that crime has increased". It has been further posited that the distorted public perception arising from the prevalence of police procedurals has been a factor in influencing sentencing rates. Countries such as the US, UK and Germany—while experiencing declines in crime rates—reported increases in the volume and severity of incarceration.

=== Ripped from the headlines ===
A concept traditionally used throughout the police procedural genre is "ripped from the headlines", a use of real crimes, events, and people to loosely develop plots for film, literature, and other media for police procedurals evoking the true events and individuals involved in them. The term is popularly recognized as having been solidified by the Law & Order franchise, which has openly recognized its episodes often inspired by high-profile criminal cases, scandals and more. Although a long-standing tradition in writing, dating as far back as Agatha Christie's Murder on the Orient Express, which takes inspiration from the Lindbergh kidnapping, the popularity of "ripped from the headlines" police procedurals has rapidly extended to a growing trend of released fiction works. The American TV channel Lifetime has also used "ripped from the headlines" to categorize it’s made-for-TV biopic films based on true criminal cases.

The use of real crimes for fiction writing has been mired with controversy. In the Law & Order episode "Sunday in the Park with Jorge", a fictional representation of the 2000 Puerto Rican Day Parade attacks is depicted. It remains the show's only publicly banned episode due to its graphic sexual violence and racism. In the Law & Order: Special Victims Unit episode "Intimidation Game", a game developer and feminist is harassed as she approaches the release of her latest game, then is kidnapped, beaten, and raped by a group of masked thugs daring the police to catch them. There are clear allusions to the Gamergate harassment campaigns, so much that the women targeted by the real campaigns openly panned the episode, arguing the material was extreme and offensive to gaming culture and the aforementioned victim gave up too easily in the end. Leading actor Ice-T, an avid gamer himself, also voiced his displeasure with the episode.

Patricia Cornwell's first Kay Scarpetta novel Postmortem bears strong resemblance to the case of serial killer Timothy Wilson Spencer, which resulted in protests from people who lived where Spencer killed women. Cornwell defended her novel by saying it wasn’t inspired by true events, but instead by concepts of criminal investigations.

True crime and pop culture author Harold Schechter published a analytical book titled Ripped from the Headlines! The Shocking True Stories Behind the Movies' Most Memorable Crimes in 2020. Schechter compiles a detailed timeline of fiction and entertainment works throughout history inspired by real criminal cases, to describe the appeal of fictionalizing true crime for the sake of entertainment.

=== Recent efforts and developments ===
Alongside protests against police brutality in the United States and abroad, and debates on the role of entertainment in the portrayal of law enforcement in society, the genre has been facing increased scrutiny. As a result, some television networks have been making an effort to address and correct the aforementioned criticism. In August 2020, it was announced that CBS writing staff would partner with 21CP Solutions, an advisory group on public safety and law enforcement, on the network's legal dramas and police procedurals. CBS producers stated that the team, including civil rights experts, lawyers and police veterans, would fix issues with CBS police procedurals to make them more realistic and accurate. As a result, the main objectives and partnership's attention is supposed to focus on an increase of inclusivity, diversity and authenticity in the production of police procedurals.

== See also ==
- Crime comics
- Crime fiction
- Legal fiction
- List of police television dramas
