= The Fire Engine That Disappeared =

1969 novel by Maj Sjöwall and Per Wahlöö

- First edition (Swedish)
- Author: Maj Sjöwall and Per Wahlöö
- Original title: Brandbilen som försvann
- Translator: Joan Tate
- Language: Swedish
- Series: Martin Beck series
- Publisher: Norstedts Förlag (Sweden); Pantheon Books (US)
- Publication date: 1969
- Publication place: Sweden
- English publication date: 1970
- Pages: 249
- Preceded by: The Laughing Policeman
- Followed by: Murder at the Savoy

The Fire Engine That Disappeared (Brandbilen som försvann) is a mystery novel by Swedish writers Sjöwall and Wahlöö, published in 1969. It is the fifth book in the Martin Beck detective series.

In the novel a house fire, which kills three people, was about to be written off as the result of a tenant's gas suicide when a forensics officer discovers a firebomb in the rubble that would have certainly killed the tenant had he not killed himself. Beck and his team launch a manhunt for the tenant's partner-in-crime, but are perplexed when the partner-in-crime is found dead at the bottom of the sea.

== Plot summary ==
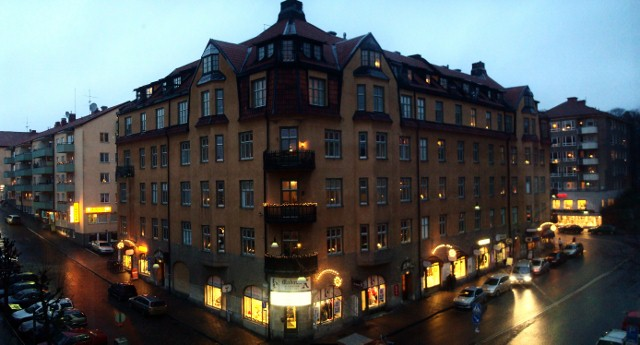
An apartment in Sundbyberg, the scene of the explosion.

Just as Gunvald Larsson arrives to replace a colleague, the apartment of a drug dealer in Stockholm, the house he is observing suddenly explodes into flames. Larsson tries to break into the house to rescue the residents, while an anonymous person calls the fire brigade from a payphone. The fire brigade arrives too late and some residents are killed.

The investigation finds that the drug dealer under surveillance has committed suicide by gas poisoning and blocked all the openings of his room. Beck still has doubts about this happening: where did the spark for the explosion come from and why did the fire department take so long to arrive? The doubts are justified, as it turns out according to the findings of the Crime Lab: the gas was lit by a hidden incendiary bomb in the mattress of the deceased.

The suspect, who had placed the incendiary, was, as it turns out, a Lebanese professional killer entering the country specifically to kill the drug dealer. He had himself called the firefighters as he wanted to avoid harming bystanders but accidentally due to lack of local knowledge he said the name of the wrong location.

== Character development ==
Beck's daughter Ingrid announces that she will leave home and encourages her father in secret to do the same. Benny Skacke is introduced as the ambitious detective to replace Stenström. Regular police officer Zachrisson is introduced.

== Film adaptation ==
The novel was adopted to film in 1993 with Gösta Ekman as Martin Beck and Rolf Lassgård as Gunvald Larsson.

Preceded by The Laughing Policeman	"Martin Beck" timeline, part 5 of 10	Succeeded by Murder at the Savoy
