= Beck – De gesloten kamer =

1993 Belgian film by Jacob Bijl

Beck - De gesloten kamer
- Theatrical release poster
- Directed by: Jacob Bijl
- Screenplay by: Jacob Bijl
- Based on: The Locked Room by Sjöwall and Wahlöö
- Starring: Jan Decleir
- Edited by: Wim Louwrier
- Music by: Lodewijk De Boer
- Distributed by: Columbia TriStar Film Distributors International (Belgium); Meteor Film (Netherlands)
- Release dates: 27 January 1993 (Belgium); 2 September 1993 (Netherlands)
- Running time: 100 minutes
- Countries: Belgium; Netherlands
- Language: Dutch

Beck – De gesloten kamer (“Beck- the closed room”) is a 1993 Dutch-language police film about Martin Beck, directed by Jacob Bijl. The film was shot in Antwerp.

== Plot ==
Martin Beck investigates the case of a man shot dead in a room locked from the inside. Is it a suicide? If so, where's the gun?

== Cast ==
- Jan Decleir as Martin Beck
- Els Dottermans as Monita
- Warre Borgmans as Waterman
- Jakob Beks as Fisher
- Geert de Jong as Roza Moreels
- Josse De Pauw as Gilles
- Sien Eggers as Ella
- Mark van Eeghem
- Christian van Acker
