= Der Mann, der sich in Luft auflöste =

1980 film

- Directed by: Péter Bacsó
- Screenplay by: Wolfgang Mühlbauer
- Based on: The Man Who Went Up in Smoke by Sjöwall and Wahlöö
- Produced by: André Libik; Bo Jonsson
- Starring: Derek Jacobi
- Cinematography: Tamás Andor
- Music by: Jacques Loussier
- Release date: 25 December 1980 (Sweden)
- Running time: 111 minutes
- Countries: West Germany; Hungary; Sweden
- Language: Hungarian

Der Mann, der sich in Luft auflöste (“The Man Who Went Up in Smoke”) (Swedish: Mannen som gick upp i rök) is a German-Hungarian-Swedish 1980 police film about Martin Beck, directed by Péter Bacsó.

== Plot ==
During the height of a Cold War, a drunken reporter from Sweden disappears without a trace while on a business trip in Budapest. Meanwhile, the tabloid for which he was writing sounds an alarm, with the Swedish government trying to avoid direct confrontation with the Hungarian police. Martin Beck, a detective, takes the case, and is sent behind enemy lines as a private citizen, to find the reporter and bring him back to Sweden. However, the official of the homicide commission faces a dilemma: How will he be able to locate a Swedish national in a city of two million? They need to interrogate charming Ari, a Hungarian girlfriend of the missing person, to gather the clues on his whereabouts.

== Cast ==
- Derek Jacobi as Martin Beck
- Judy Winter as Aina Mattsson
- Lasse Strömstedt as Kollberg
- Ferenc Bàcs as Major Szluka
- Krisztina Peremartoni as Aranka Ari
- Tomas Bolme as Åke Gunnarsson
- Thomas Oredsson as Alf Mattsson
- Kjell Bergqvist as Stenström
- Mari Szür as Mrs Bubla
- Sándor Szabó as Sós
- Zoltán Gera as Kuti
- Dieter Schidor as Embassy Secretary
- Helena Brodin as Mrs Beck
