= Peter Keglevic =

Austrian film director

- Born: 1950 (age 75–76); Salzburg, Austria
- Occupations: Film director Screenwriter
- Years active: 1976–present

Peter Keglevic (born 1950) is an Austrian film director and screenwriter. He has directed 30 films since 1976. His film Bella Donna was screened at the 1983 Cannes Film Festival.

== Selected filmography ==
- Tatort: Beweisaufnahme (1981, TV series episode)
- Years Passed (1981, TV film)
- Tatort: Sterben und sterben lassen (1982, TV series episode)
- Bella Donna (1983)
- The Cop and the Girl (1985)
- Magic Sticks (1987)
- An Odd Couple (1988, TV film) — (based on a story by Dieter Wellershoff)
- The Play with Billions (1989, TV film)
- Kill Cruise (1990)
- The Police Murderer (1994) — (based on Cop Killer by Sjöwall and Wahlöö)
- Stockholm Marathon (1994) — (based on The Terrorists by Sjöwall and Wahlöö)
- Judgment Day (1994, TV film)
- 5 Stunden Angst – Geiselnahme im Kindergarten (1995, TV film)
- You Are Not Alone: The Roy Black Story (1996, TV film)
- Vicky's Nightmare (1998, TV film)
- The Call Girl (1999, TV film)
- Falling Rocks (2000)
- Dance with the Devil (2001, TV film)
- Two Days of Hope (2003, TV film)
- Blackout – Die Erinnerung ist tödlich (2006, TV miniseries)
- Day of Disaster (2007, TV film)
- Die dunkle Seite (2008, TV film) — (based on a novel by Frank Schätzing)
- Ice Fever (2010, TV film) — (based on Whiteout by Ken Follett)
- Congo (2010, TV film)
- The Man from Beijing (2011, TV film) — (based on The Man from Beijing by Henning Mankell)
