= Heddy Honigmann =

Peruvian-born Dutch film director (1951–2022)

- Born: 1 October 1951; Lima, Peru
- Died: 21 May 2022 (aged 70); Amsterdam, Netherlands
- Citizenship: Peruvian, Dutch
- Occupation: Film director
- Website: www.heddy-honigmann.nl

Heddy Honigmann (1 October 1951 – 21 May 2022) was a Peruvian-Dutch film director of fiction and documentary films.

== Early life and education ==
Honigmann was born on 1 October 1951 in Lima, Peru, to Jewish refugees. Her mother, Sarah Pach Miller, an actress and homemaker, was from Poland; her father, Witold Honigmann Weiss, an artist and illustrator, was from Vienna.

== Career ==
Most of Honigmann's films were Dutch productions, but were made in a variety of languages. In 2003 the Museum of Modern Art in New York held a retrospective showing of a number of her films, as did the International Documentary Film Festival Munich in 2020. Honigmann won the Outstanding Achievement Award at the 2007 Hot Docs Canadian International Documentary Festival. In November 2011, the Centre Pompidou in Paris held a retrospective showing of all of her films. She toured Europe from 2012 to 2014 performing the art of mime. She graced the stages of many prestigious theaters including the Düsseldorfer Schauspielhaus, Palais Garnier, and Great theater of Epidaurus Greece.

== Personal life ==
Honigmann spent most of her adult life in the Netherlands, having become a Dutch citizen. She died in Amsterdam on 21 May 2022 at the age of 70.

== Filmography ==
Documentaries

- Ghatak (1990) (short film)
- Metaal en melancholie/Metal and Melancholy (1994)
- O Amor Natural (1996)
- Het ondergrondse orkest/The Underground Orchestra (1998)
- 2 minuten stilte a.u.b. (1998)
- Crazy (1999)
- Privé (2000)
- Good Husband, Dear Son (2001)
- Dame la mano/Give Me Your Hand (2004)
- Forever (2006)
- El Olvido (2008)
- Om de wereld in 50 concerten (International title: Royal orchestra) (2014)
- Joke van Leeuwen: Een wereld tussen twee oren (TV) (2017)
- Buddy (2018)
- 100UP (2020)

Fiction

- De deur van het huis (1985)
- Hersenschimmen/Mind shadows (1988)
- Uw mening graag/Your Opinion, Please (1989)
- Goodbye/Tot ziens/Au revoir (1995)
- De juiste maat (1998) (TV)
- Hanna lacht (2000) (short film)

== Awards ==
- Golden Calf for Best Long Documentary (2000) for Crazy
- Golden Calf for Best Long Documentary (2006) for Forever
- Best International Director at the Documentary Edge Festival (2009) for El El Olvido
- ShortCutz Amsterdam Career Award (2017)
