= Love Belongs to Everyone =

2006 film by Hilde Van Mieghem

Dennis van Rita
- Theatrical release poster
- Directed by: Hilde Van Mieghem
- Story by: Hugo Van Laere
- Starring: Matthias Schoenaerts; Veerle Baetens; Els Dottermans
- Cinematography: Jan Vancaillie
- Distributed by: Caviar Films
- Release date: 8 February 2006
- Country: Belgium
- Language: Dutch

Love Belongs to Everyone (original Dutch title: Dennis van Rita, literally Dennis from Rita) is a 2006 Flemish film directed by Hilde Van Mieghem and written by Hugo Van Laere. It stars Els Dottermans, Matthias Schoenaerts and Veerle Baetens.

== Plot ==
Dennis (Schoenaerts) is 26 years old but has the mind of a child. He is obsessed with trains and train schedules. His mother Rita (Dottermans) is overjoyed when Dennis returns from prison after serving a sentence for the alleged rape of an underage girl. The neighborhood, however, is not happy with Dennis' homecoming, especially Barbara (Baetens).

After Dennis masturbates at the playground – with his pants on – Rita and his father André (Damiaan De Schrijver) decide to keep him inside. However, when Rita is at her work, André is watching Dennis but falls asleep. In this timeframe, Dennis goes outside to see the trains but does not return. Later on the evening, the police tell them that Dennis raped a woman (Maaike Neuville). Dennis is found in a train station.

Dennis is being questioned by a psychiatrist. He concludes there is no proper psychiatric institution where Dennis can be handled, so he is sent to jail, where he is beaten and harassed by the other prisoners. The guards, who despise sex offenders, do nothing to help him. Eventually, Dennis tries to kill himself.

Rita contacts Thomas (Tom Van Dyck), a lawyer who coincidentally happens to be Barbara's boyfriend. A medical examination proves the girl was indeed raped by Dennis. Thomas thinks Dennis belongs in a psychiatric institution, not prison, so he tries to convince the judge. Barbara changes her mind after a quarrel with Thomas. She initially hoped Rita and her family would move or Dennis would be locked up forever, but never realized Dennis does need professional help.

They try to petition the government for Dennis' release, and are able to make an appearance on a famous Belgian debate television show. Some days later, Rita gets a letter from a psychiatric institution which will accept Dennis as a patient. There, Dennis explains that the girl took him to an abandoned place as she claimed to know all about trains and schedules. She told she was cold so he gave her his sweater. She stroked his belly, but he told her she must not do that as it is forbidden. As she kept going on and looked at him very nicely, he pushed the girl away. She hit her head, knocking her unconscious. Dennis thought she was dead and removed the sweater. He felt her warm belly and became aroused, leading to the rape.

The trial and judgment are not revealed.

== Principal cast ==
- Els Dottermans as Rita
- Matthias Schoenaerts as Dennis
- Veerle Baetens as Barbara
- Damiaan De Schrijver
- Hans de Munter as psychiater
- Rudolph Segers as inmate
- Tom Van Dyck

== Awards and nominations ==
=== Won ===
Shanghai International Film Festival

- Best Actress (Dottermans)
- Best Screenplay (Van Laere)
