= Unfinished Supper =

1980 film by Jānis Streičs

Nepabeigtās vakariņas
- Directed by: Jānis Streičs
- Based on: Murder at the Savoy by Sjöwall and Wahlöö
- Starring: Romualds Ancāns; Ingrīda Andriņa; Lilita Bērziņa
- Release date: 1979 (Soviet Union)
- Running time: 123 minutes
- Country: Soviet Union
- Language: Russian

The Unfinished Supper (Russian: Незаконченный ужин, Latvian: Nepabeigtās vakariņas) is a 1979 Soviet police film about Martin Beck, directed by Jānis Streičs, based on the novel Murder at the Savoy (1970).

== Plot ==
At a banquet in the "Savoy" restaurant, which resembles a café, a prominent Swedish businessman and head of the Palmgren conglomerate is murdered. As the investigation progresses, it becomes increasingly evident that the true cause of the tragedy lies in state-level corruption, implicating a powerful governmental mafia. However, the investigators are instructed not to delve too deeply into these connections. To expedite the investigation, renowned criminal police commissioner Martin Beck is dispatched from the capital, accompanied by a security police (SEPO) inspector sent to monitor the proceedings.

Throughout the case, both the police and SEPO inspectors behave rudely, frequently drinking beer and refusing to show identification. Despite these challenges, the team eventually identifies the murderer as Berthold Svensson, an unemployed former employee of Palmgren's conglomerate. Svensson confesses to committing the crime out of a desire for revenge.

== Cast ==
- Romualds Ancāns as Martin Beck
- Ingrīda Andriņa as Anna
- Lilita Bērziņa as Fru Grengren
- Pauls Butkēvičs as Backlund
- Jānis Paukštello as Benny Skacke
- Lilita Ozoliņa as Sonya
- Ivars Kalniņš as Mats Linder
