= Bella Donna (1983 film) =

1983 film

- Film poster
- Directed by: Peter Keglevic
- Written by: Peter Keglevic
- Produced by: Joachim von Mengershausen; Joachim von Vietinghoff
- Starring: Harry Baer
- Cinematography: Edward Klosinski
- Edited by: Siegrun Jäger
- Release date: May 1983
- Running time: 107 minutes
- Country: West Germany
- Language: German

Bella Donna is a 1983 West German drama film directed by Peter Keglevic. It was screened in the Un Certain Regard section at the 1983 Cannes Film Festival.

== Cast ==
In alphabetical order

- Harry Baer
- Angela Göckel as Maria
- Brigitte Horney as Jutta
- Krystyna Janda as Lena
- Erland Josephson as Max
- Peter Kern
- Friedrich-Karl Praetorius as Fritz
- Kurt Raab
- Ilse Ritter
