= Goodbye (1995 film) =

1995 film

Tot Ziens!
- Theatrical release poster
- Directed by: Heddy Honigmann
- Written by: Heddy Honigmann; Helena van der Meulen
- Produced by: Suzanne van Voorst
- Starring: Johanna ter Steege; Guy Van Sande; Els Dottermans
- Cinematography: Stef Tijdink
- Edited by: Sander Vos
- Music by: Wouter van Bemmel
- Production company: Ariel Film
- Distributed by: Meteor Film
- Release date: 7 September 1995
- Running time: 114 minutes
- Country: Netherlands
- Language: Dutch
- Box office: $0.2 million (Netherlands)

Goodbye or Tot Ziens! is a 1995 Dutch film directed by Heddy Honigmann.

== Plot ==
Laura and Jan meet at the ice rink; it's love at first sight. There's a problem: Jan is already married and has a happy marriage. After a night together, they try to distance themselves again. But the two keep running into each other and repeatedly end up in each other's arms. Even though both are burdened by feelings of guilt, they are drawn to each other like a magnet. The title alludes to the fact that both lovers repeatedly say goodbye, intending never to see each other again, and always leave with a goodbye.

== Cast ==
- Johanna ter Steege ... Laura
- Guy Van Sande ... Jan
- Els Dottermans ... Ann
- Warre Borgmans ... Walter
- Nelleke Zitman ... Ine
- Stefan van de Staak ... Stefan
- Cas Enklaar ... Dassenverkoper
- Bart Klever ... Loketbeamte
- Johan van Assche ... Journalist Brussel
- Saskia Temmink ... Barbara
- Nina Spijkers ... Clara
