= Els Dottermans =

Belgian actress

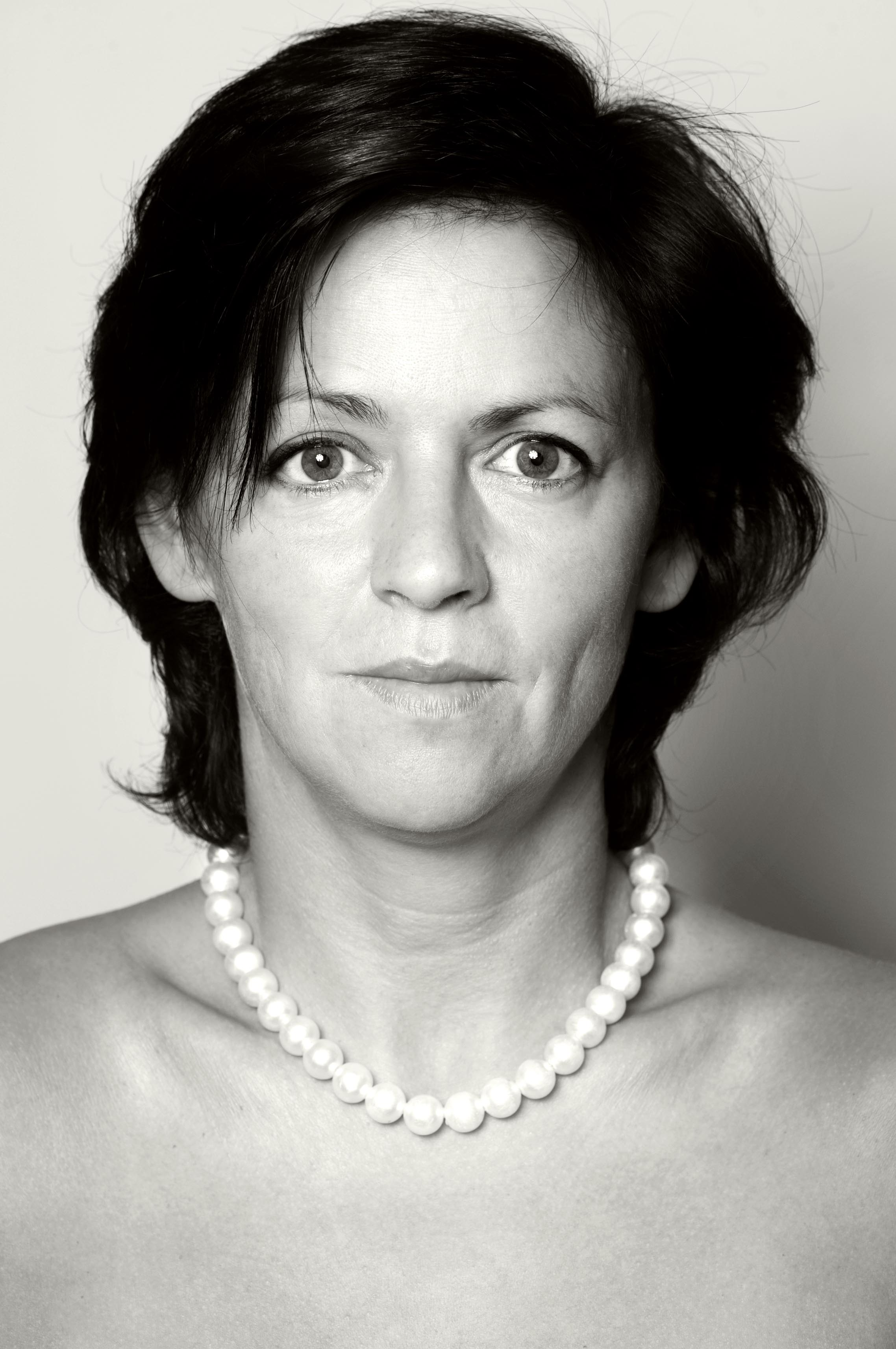
- Els Dottermans
- Born: Leuven, Belgium
- Occupation: Actress
- Years active: 1988-present

Els Dottermans is a Belgian actress of stage, film, and television.

== Early life and education ==
Els Dottermans was born in Leuven, Belgium.

She trained at Studio Herman Teirlinck in Antwerp.

== Career ==
Dottermans was one of a permanent ensemble of actors retained by NTGent before its structure changed in 2018 under the new artistic director Milo Rau.

== Awards ==
Dottermans has been the recipient of several film awards, including two Best Actress wins at the Joseph Plateau Awards, a Golden Calf award for Best Actress at the Nederlands Film Festival, and a Golden Goblet award for Best Actress at the Shanghai International Film Festival.

== Filmography ==
Year	Title
1993	Beck – De gesloten kamer
1995	Antonia's Line
1995	Goodbye
2003	The Alzheimer Case
2006	Love Belongs to Everyone
2023	Rough Diamonds
