= Crazy (1999 film) =

- Directed by: Heddy Honigmann
- Written by: Heddy Honigmann; Ester Gould
- Release date: 1999
- Running time: 97 minutes
- Country: Netherlands
- Language: Dutch

Crazy is a 1999 documentary film by Heddy Honigmann on the traumatic effects of war on the soldiers of United Nations peacekeeping missions.

The documentary shows Dutch soldiers that have served in UN missions in the former Yugoslavia, Korea, Kosovo, Lebanon, Cambodia, and Rwanda. The heroic duties contrast with the local horrors. The music, the favorite songs of the soldiers, serves the eight men and one woman interviewed as a key to unlock the chest of vivid memories: frequent trips through "Bomb Alley"; food convoys; the fall of Sarajevo; and camp life. One of the soldiers is marines commander Patrick Cammaert, who since has served in further very important UN missions. He chose the song "Crazy" (performed by Seal) to accompany the bloodbath of the attack on the Sarajevo market.

The film is regarded as an accusation against the Dutch Defense organization on the care for its soldiers. However, a 1997 study conducted by the Free University of Amsterdam on 3500 military personnel that served in UN missions since 1975 showed that one out of five soldiers had not fully come to terms with their experiences.

== Awards ==
- Golden Calf for Best Documentary Film (2000)
