= O Amor Natural =

- Directed by: Heddy Honigmann
- Written by: Carlos Drummond de Andrade (poems), Heddy Honigmann (writer)
- Release date: December 5, 1996
- Running time: 76 minutes
- Country: Netherlands
- Language: Portuguese

O Amor Natural is a 1996 Dutch documentary film directed by Heddy Honigmann. The film was shot in Rio de Janeiro, Brazil in Portuguese.
