= Roseanna (novel) =

Mystery novel

- First edition (Swedish)
- Author: Maj Sjöwall and Per Wahlöö
- Original title: Roseanna
- Language: Swedish
- Series: Martin Beck series
- Publisher: Norstedts Förlag (Sweden); Pantheon Books (US)
- Publication date: 1965
- Publication place: Sweden
- English publication date: 1967
- Pages: 220
- Followed by: The Man Who Went Up in Smoke

Roseanna is a mystery novel by Swedish writers Maj Sjöwall and Per Wahlöö, first published in 1965. It is the first novel in their detective series revolving around Martin Beck and his team.

== Plot summary ==
A young woman is found dead in the Göta Canal, molested and murdered. The case is almost instantly cold: nobody can identify her and where and by whom she was killed. Then a stroke of luck: through Interpol her identity is ascertained; she is Roseanna McGraw, an American tourist who was taking a boat trip in southern Sweden. A meticulous investigation determines that she was murdered aboard the boat by a fellow passenger. Evidence is lacking, but after the suspect is observed at length, a sting operation of questionable ethical status (Beck's own opinion) results in the suspect, a sexual deviant, attacking a female police officer and being arrested.

== Characters ==
Martin Beck, Lennart Kollberg and Fredrik Melander are introduced. Later in the novel Åke Stenström makes an appearance in one of his trademark pursuits.

Lesser characters who will make appearances in later novels are detective Ahlberg of the Motala police force, and detective Sonja Hansson of the Stockholm police force. The reader is also introduced to Beck's wife, son, and daughter.

== Film adaptations ==
The novel has been adapted to film twice. In 1967 the film Roseanna became the first film about Martin Beck, with Keve Hjelm as Beck. In 1993 a new film based on the novel and with the same name was released, this time with Gösta Ekman as Beck.

Preceded by none	"Martin Beck" timeline, part 1 of 10	Succeeded by The Man Who Went Up in Smoke
