= Murder at the Savoy =

Novel by Maj Sjöwall and Per Wahlöö

- First edition (Swedish)
- Author: Maj Sjöwall and Per Wahlöö
- Original title: Polis, polis, potatismos!
- Language: Swedish
- Series: Martin Beck series
- Publisher: Norstedts Förlag (Swedish); Pantheon Books (English)
- Publication date: 1970
- Publication place: Sweden
- English publication date: 1971
- Pages: 231
- Preceded by: The Fire Engine That Disappeared
- Followed by: The Abominable Man

Murder at the Savoy (original title: Polis, polis, potatismos! literally "Police, Police, Mashed Potatoes!") is a 1970 crime novel by Swedish writers Maj Sjöwall and Per Wahlöö. It is the sixth book out of ten in the detective series by revolving around police detective Martin Beck.

== Title ==
Murder at the Savoy is the English title of the novel. The Swedish title of the book, meaning "Police, police, mashed potatoes", is explained in a scene where Gunvald Larsson is telling off the miserably lazy policemen Kristiansson and Kvant. The two policemen had, instead of obeying their orders to arrest a suspect at Arlanda Airport, been arguing with a man whose 3-year-old son had shouted "Police, police, mashed potatoes" at the two policemen while they were eating hot dog with mashed potatoes at a grill bar. This refers to the common rhyme "polis polis potatisgris" ("police, police, potato pig").

== Plot ==
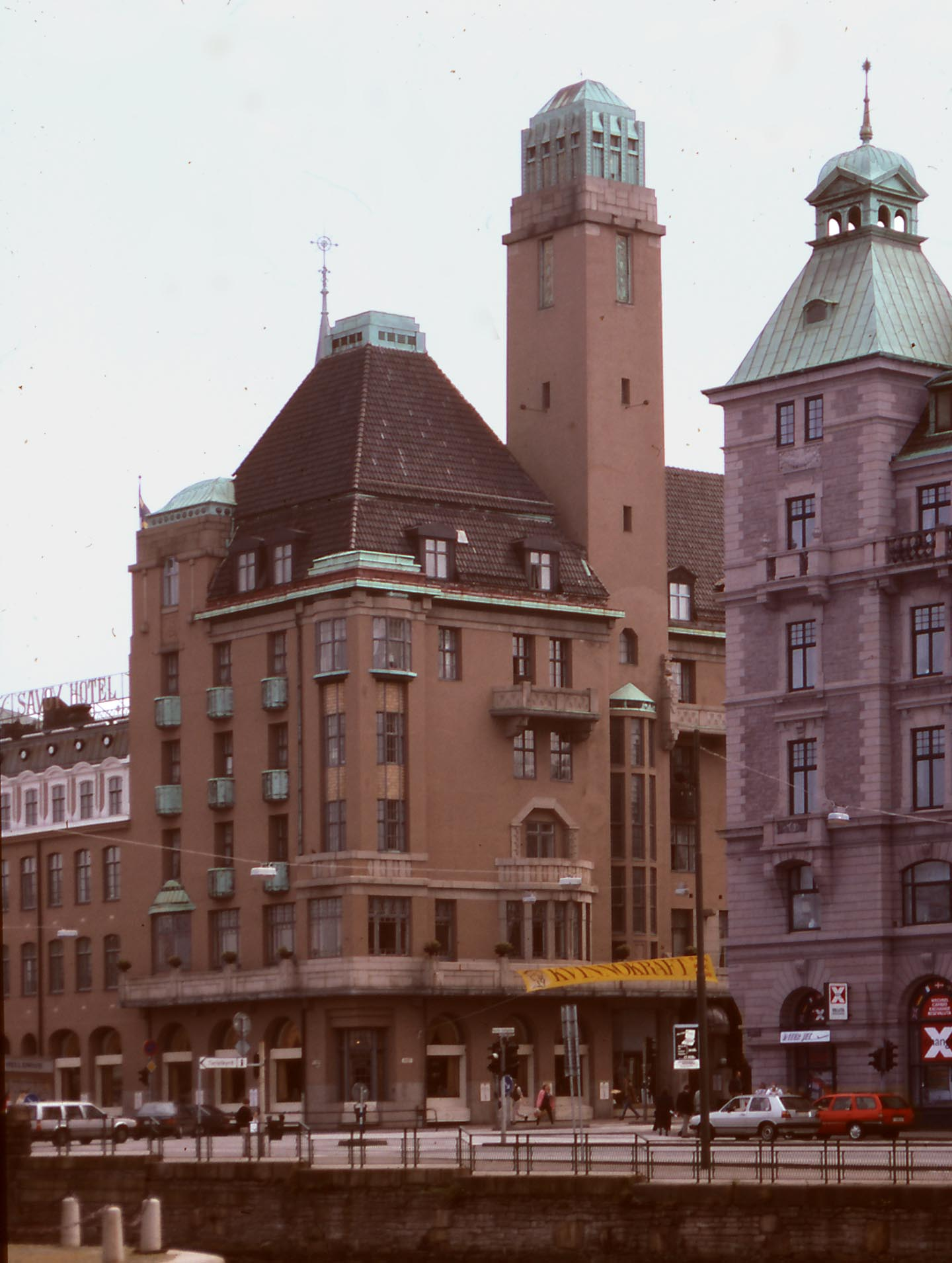
Savoy Hotel in Malmö, Sweden.

Martin Beck has to search through the high powered business man Viktor Palmgren's many enemies when the business man is shot in front of a dozen witnesses at a high-end restaurant. Behind the facade of legal transactions he finds out that Palmgren had earned most of his money with illegal arms deals.

During the investigation it turns out that Bertil Svensson shot Palmgren because he had caused his unemployment, the loss of his home and, ultimately, the loss of his family. Svensson confesses and is arrested while Palmgren's unscrupulous business partners remain largely undisturbed.

== Film adaptations ==
The novel has been adapted to film twice. The 1979 Latvian film Unfinished Supper, directed by Jānis Streičs, was based on the book. Romualds Ancāns played the role of Martin Beck.

A Swedish adaption of the novel was released in 1993, directed by Pelle Berglund. Gösta Ekman played the role of Martin Beck and Rolf Lassgård played Gunvald Larsson.

Preceded by The Fire Engine That Disappeared	"Martin Beck" timeline, part 6 of 10	Succeeded by The Abominable Man
