= The Laughing Policeman (film) =

1974 film by Stuart Rosenberg

- Theatrical release poster
- Directed by: Stuart Rosenberg
- Screenplay by: Thomas Rickman
- Based on: The Laughing Policeman by Maj Sjöwall and Per Wahlöö
- Produced by: Stuart Rosenberg
- Starring: Walter Matthau; Bruce Dern; Louis Gossett Jr. Anthony Zerbe; Albert Paulsen
- Cinematography: David M. Walsh
- Edited by: Bob Wyman
- Music by: Charles Fox
- Distributed by: 20th Century Fox
- Release date: December 20, 1973
- Running time: 112 minutes
- Country: United States
- Language: English
- Budget: $2 million
- Box office: $1.7 million (rentals)

The Laughing Policeman (released in the UK as An Investigation of Murder) is a 1973 American neo-noir thriller film loosely based on the 1968 novel of the same name by Maj Sjöwall and Per Wahlöö. The setting of the story is transplanted from Stockholm to San Francisco. It is directed by Stuart Rosenberg and features Walter Matthau as Detective Jake Martin.

== Plot ==
A busload of passengers, including off-duty police detective Dave Evans, is gunned down and killed. Evans, on his own time, has been following a man named Gus Niles in search of information linking businessman Henry Camarero to the murder of Henry's wife Teresa two years earlier.

Detective Sergeant Jake Martin, a veteran but cynical member of the Homicide Detail, was Evans' partner and is working on the investigation of a bus massacre. Jake originally investigated the Teresa Camarero case and has been obsessed with his failure to "make" Camarero for the murder. Jake returns to it after many dead-end leads (including a disastrous confrontation with a deranged amputee who takes hostages at gunpoint) in the bus investigation. Niles was killed on the bus as well, and it was Niles who provided the alibi that enabled Camarero to cover up his wife's murder.

The sullen Jake and enthusiastic but impulsive Inspector Leo Larsen are paired to interview suspects. Jake shuts out Larsen from his deductions, while Larsen, despite a loose-on-the-rules and brutal side, tries to understand and gain the confidence of his new partner. Defying the orders of their police superior Lieutenant Steiner, they seek, find and smoke out Camarero, leading to a chase through the streets of San Francisco and a confrontation aboard another bus.

== Cast ==
- Walter Matthau as Sgt. Jake Martin (Martin Beck in the novel)
- Bruce Dern as Insp. Leo Larsen (Gunvald Larsson in the novel)
- Louis Gossett Jr. as Insp. James Larrimore
- Anthony Zerbe as Lt. Nat Steiner
- Albert Paulsen as Henry Camerero
- Val Avery as Insp. John Pappas
- Paul Koslo as Duane Haygood
- Cathy Lee Crosby as Kay Butler
- Joanna Cassidy as Monica
- Clifton James as Maloney
- Gregory Sierra as Vickery
- Matt Clark as Coroner

== Reception ==
On review aggregator website Rotten Tomatoes, the film has a score of 59%, based on reviews from 17 critics, with an average rating of 5.8/10. Metacritic, which uses a weighted average, assigned the film a score of 57 out of 100, based on 9 critics, indicating "mixed or average" reviews.

Roger Ebert of the Chicago Sun-Times said:

The Laughing Policeman is an awfully good police movie: taut, off-key, filled with laconic performances. It provides the special delight we get from gradually unraveling a complicated case... The direction is by Stuart Rosenberg, and marks a comeback of sorts... With The Laughing Policeman, he takes a labyrinthine plot and leads us through it at a gallop, he respects our intelligence and doesn't bother to throw in a lot of scenes where everything is explained. All the pieces in the puzzle do fit together, you realize after the movie is over, and part of the fun is assembling them yourself. And there are a couple of scenes that are really stunning, like the bus shooting, and an emergency room operation, and scenes where the partners try to shake up street people to get a lead out of them. Police movies so often depend on sheer escapist action that it's fun to find a good one.

Variety praised the film, saying, "After an extremely overdone prolog of violent mass murder on a bus, The Laughing Policeman becomes a handsomely made manhunt actioner, starring Walter Matthau and Bruce Dern in excellent performances as two San Francisco detectives."

According to Chris Petit of Time Out, "By the end, complete with car chase and split-second shooting, the film has become indistinguishable from all those movies it's trying so hard to disown."

Matthew Hartman of High-Def Digest wrote that "[the film] could have been a great and gritty 70s thriller, unfortunately, it's [sic] primary story doesn't live up to the potential of the opening scene."

== Home media ==
The Laughing Policeman was released on Blu-ray on November 15, 2016.

== See also ==
- List of American films of 1973
