= The Laughing Policeman (novel) =

Swedish novel by Maj Sjöwall and Per Wahlöö

- First edition (Swedish)
- Author: Maj Sjöwall; Per Wahlöö
- Original title: Den skrattande polisen
- Language: Swedish
- Series: Martin Beck series
- Publisher: Norstedts Förlag (Swedish); Pantheon Books (English)
- Publication date: 1968
- Publication place: Sweden
- English publication date: 1970
- Pages: 240
- ISBN: 9780679742234
- Preceded by: The Man on the Balcony
- Followed by: The Fire Engine That Disappeared

The Laughing Policeman is a mystery novel by the Swedish writing duo Maj Sjöwall and Per Wahlöö, originally published in Sweden in 1968 as Den skrattande polisen and translated into English in 1970. It is the fourth of ten novels featuring police detective Martin Beck.

In 1971, The Laughing Policeman won an Edgar Award for Best Novel. The 1973 American film The Laughing Policeman is a loose adaptation of the novel.

Jonathan Franzen has written an introduction for a Penguin Random House edition of the book. He describes radically critical image of Sweden as 'comic'. Franzen's 2012 collection of essays Farther Away also contains a reprint of a 2008 piece, "On The Laughing Policeman".

== Explanation of the title ==
The novel's title, The Laughing Policeman, derives from a 1922 British song of the same name. Detective Beck, ill for a long time and with a strained marriage, has not laughed in a long time. When Beck receives the record as a Christmas gift from his daughter, Ingrid, who has noticed her father's behaviour, he does not find it funny. He only laughs at the very end of the novel, after the vindication of murdered Detective, Åke Stenström.

== Plot ==
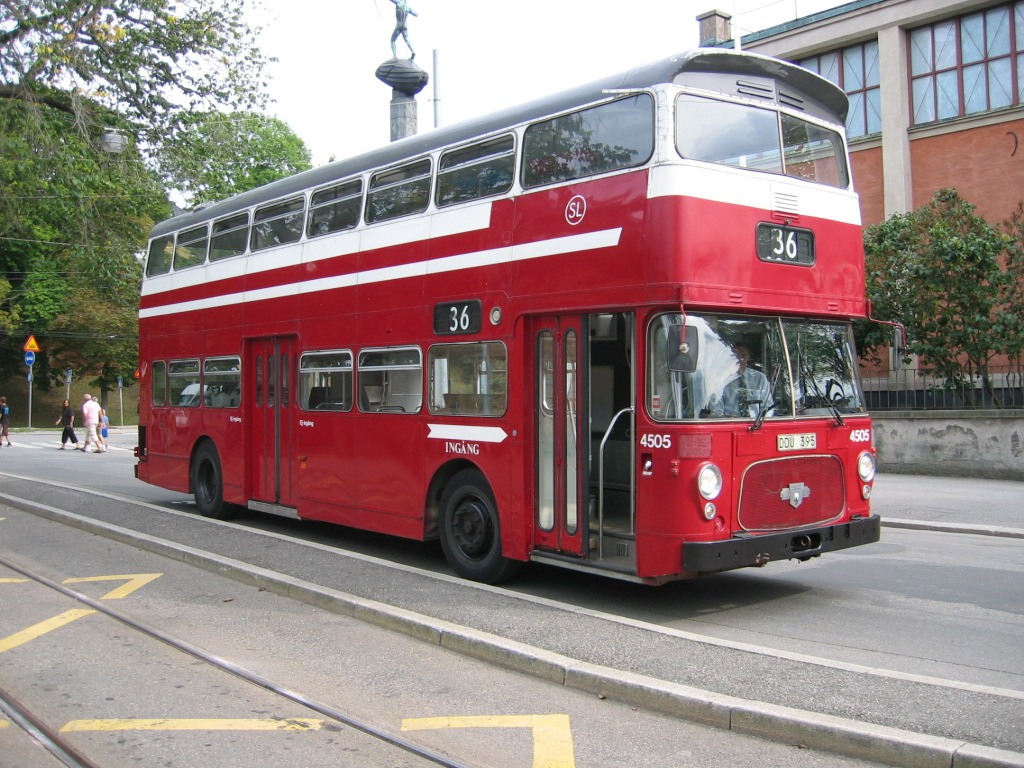
The crime scene: a Leyland Atlantean bus.

A gunman shoots the passengers of a bus with a sub-machine gun, killing eight people, including Detective Åke Stenström, and wounding one. After a painstaking investigation, Detective Beck and his team come to suspect that the mass killing is designed to hide the true target, Stenström himself, who was spending his free time unofficially investigating the murder of a Portuguese prostitute sixteen years earlier in an attempt to solve the case and demonstrate his skills to his older police comrades. Beck must now complete Stenström's work by solving the earlier murder in order to identify Stenström's killer.

== Character development ==
To solve the case, Beck calls on several outsiders: Detective Richard Ullholm, a reactionary who, as a hobby, lodges formal complaints to the Parliamentary Ombudsman regarding his fellow officers; Malmö Detective Per Månsson (introduced in a previous novel), the man who can find anything; and detective Ulf Nordin, the most tenacious investigator. Åsa Torrell, Stenström's girlfriend, plays a significant emotional part in the story. After recovering from the shock of her boyfriend's murder, she states her intention to join the police.

== Film adaptation ==
The novel was adapted to film in 1973, with Walter Matthau in the lead role. His character was renamed "Jake Martin", the action was relocated to San Francisco, California, and much of the novel's plot was altered.

== Comic book adaptation ==
In 2011, French comics artist Martin Viot adapted The Laughing Policeman into a comic book, Le Policier Qui Rit.

== Sources ==
Preceded by The Man on the Balcony	"Martin Beck" timeline, part 4 of 10	Succeeded by The Fire Engine That Disappeared
