= Joan Tate =

British writer and translator of Swedish

Joan Tate née Eames (23 September 1922 – 6 June 2000) was a British writer and translator, translating works by many leading Swedish and other Scandinavian language writers into English.

Tate's translations from Swedish include books by Astrid Lindgren, Ingmar Bergman, Britt Ekland, Kerstin Ekman, P C Jersild, Sven Lindqvist, Agneta Pleijel, and the team of Maj Sjöwall and Per Wahlöö. She also translated works from Norwegian and Danish, translating a total of around 200 books during her career.

She was a founder member of the Swedish-English Literary Translators' Association (SELTA) and was on the editorial board of the Swedish Book Review. She received a translation award from the Swedish Academy and was made an Officer of the Order of the Polar Star.

Her own books, which she continued to write while working as a translator, were mainly for children and young people, and included both fiction and nonfiction.
