= Martin Beck =

Fictional Swedish police detective

- The ten 2007 HarperCollins editions lined up next to one another
- Roseanna; The Man Who Went Up in Smoke; The Man on the Balcony; The Laughing Policeman; The Fire Engine That Disappeared; Murder at the Savoy; The Abominable Man; The Locked Room; Cop Killer; The Terrorists
- Author: Maj Sjöwall and Per Wahlöö
- Translator: Lois Roth (1), Joan Tate (2, 5, 6, 10), Alain Blair (3, 4), Amy and Ken Knoespel (6), Thomas Teal (7, 9) and Paul Britten Austin (8).
- Country: Sweden
- Language: Swedish, translated into English
- Discipline: Police procedural
- Published: 1965-1975
- No. of books: 10

Martin Beck is a fictional Swedish police detective, the main character in the series of ten novels by Maj Sjöwall and Per Wahlöö, collectively titled The Story of a Crime. Frequently referred to as the Martin Beck stories, all were adapted into films between 1967 and 1994. Six were adapted for a series featuring Gösta Ekman as Martin Beck.

Between 1997 and 2026, there were also 54 films (some released direct for video and broadcast on television) based on the characters, with Peter Haber as Martin Beck. Apart from the core duo of Beck and his right-hand man Gunvald Larsson, the latter adaptations bear little resemblance to the plots of the original series. They feature a widely different and evolving cast of characters, though roughly similar themes and settings around Stockholm.

== Series ==
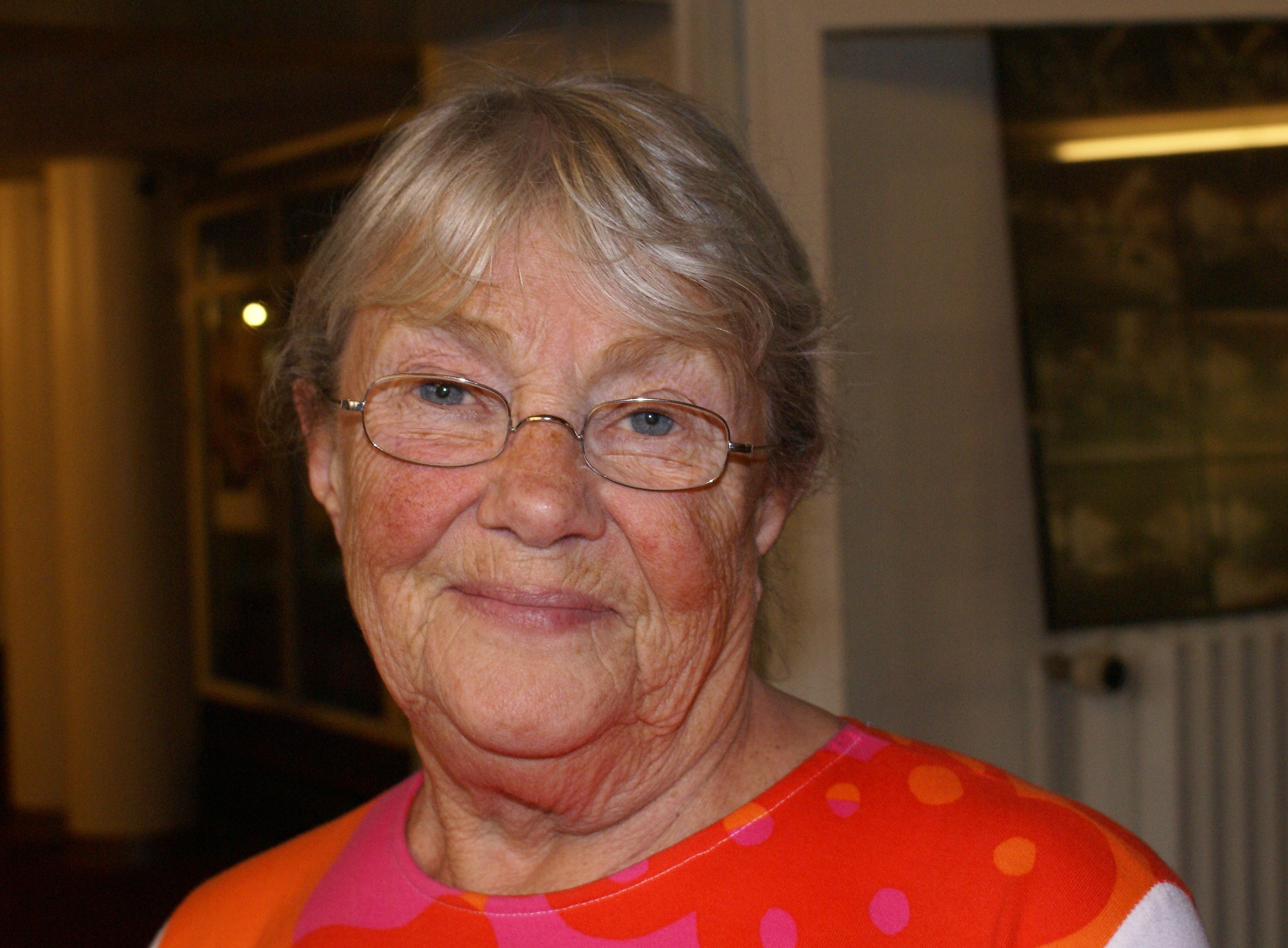
Maj Sjöwall, joint author of the series.

During the 1960s and 1970s, Sjöwall and Wahlöö conceived and wrote a series of ten police procedural novels about the exploits of detectives from the special homicide commission of the Swedish national police; in these the character of Martin Beck was the protagonist. (Both authors also wrote novels separately.) For the Martin Beck series, they plotted and researched each book together, and then wrote alternate chapters simultaneously. The books cover ten years and are renowned for extensive character and setting development throughout the series. This is in part due to careful planning by Sjöwall and Wahlöö.

1. Roseanna (Roseanna, 1965)
2. The Man Who Went Up in Smoke (Mannen som gick upp i rök, 1966)
3. The Man on the Balcony (Mannen på balkongen, 1967)
4. The Laughing Policeman (Den skrattande polisen, 1968) (Edgar Award, Best Novel, 1971)
5. The Fire Engine That Disappeared (Brandbilen som försvann, 1969)
6. Murder at the Savoy (Polis, polis, potatismos!, 1970)
7. The Abominable Man (Den vedervärdige mannen från Säffle, 1971)
8. The Locked Room (Det slutna rummet, 1972)
9. Cop Killer (Polismördaren, 1974)
10. The Terrorists (Terroristerna, 1975)

== Characters ==
=== Primary characters ===
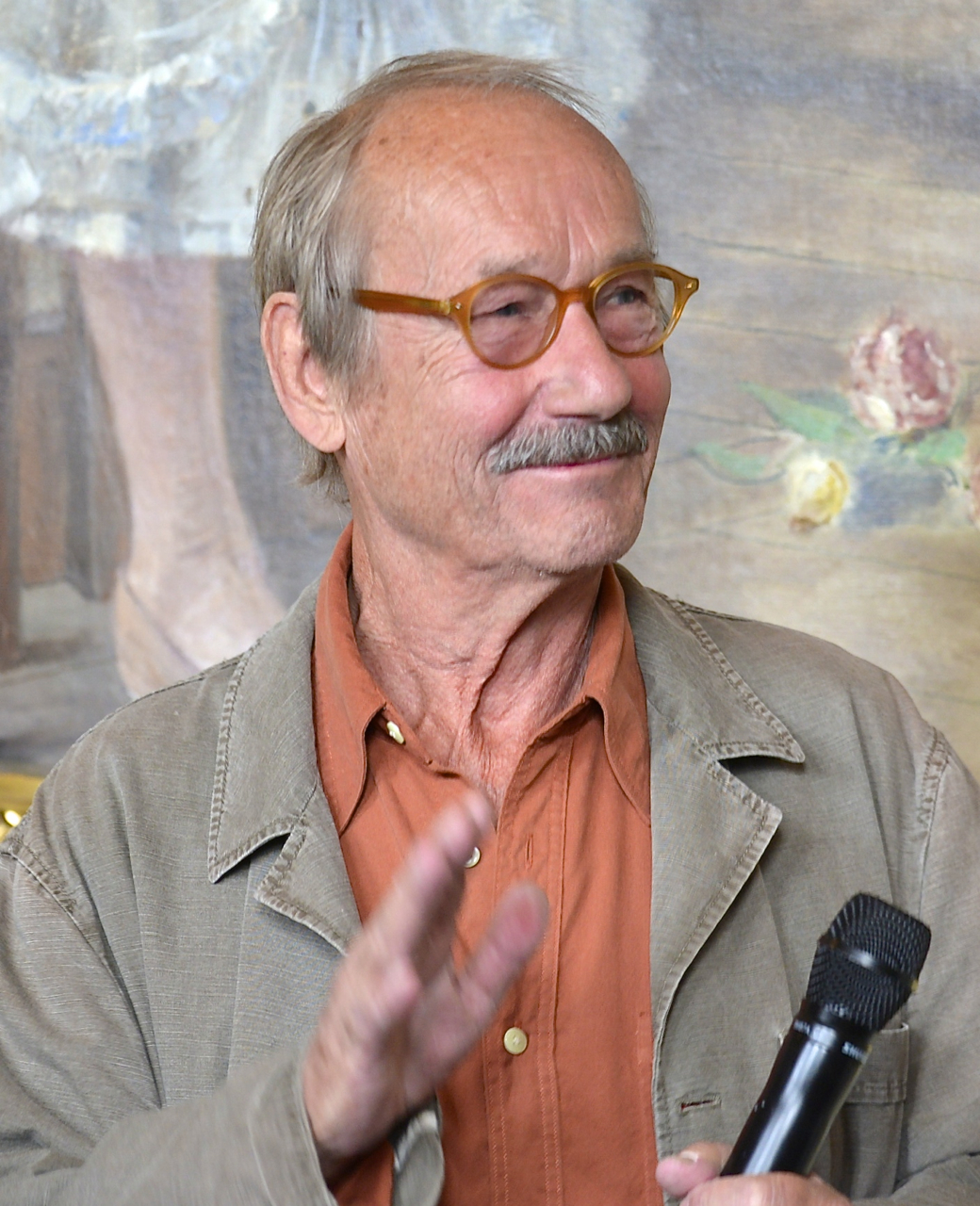
Gösta Ekman, who played Martin Beck in the 1993/1994 film series of 6 books.

Martin Beck: The protagonist of the series, Martin Beck goes from being an unhappily married man and father of two young teenagers, to a divorced man in a happy unmarried relationship with Rhea Nielsen, a kind and empathetic landlady whom Beck meets while investigating the death of a man who was Nielsen's tenant. Beck is prone to colds and often suffers from ailments and physical discomforts. Beck also gets several promotions, from Detective to Inspector, and Chief of the National Murder Squad by the end of the series. This seems to be to the chagrin of everyone involved, including him, as he hates the vision of being confined to desk work. In Cop Killer, he is happily spared a promotion to a Commissioner. In The Terrorists, he is, however, forced to become Chief of Operations in an important job protecting an American senator, meaning that he is for once, in theory, higher in position than his superior, Malm. He is allowed to assemble his perfect team, consisting of Larsson, Rönn, Skacke, Melander and himself. He does extremely well coordinating the desk work and keeping in communication (through allowing Melander to handle all telephone communications, and diverting all telephone calls, or switching off the telephone altogether whenever he needs time to think), impressing the Commissioner. In The Abominable Man, he is shot and severely wounded. He quits smoking after the incident as his favourite manufacturer discontinues his preferred type of cigarette.

Lennart Kollberg: Beck's most trusted colleague; a sarcastic glutton with a Socialist worldview; served as a paratrooper. After having shot and accidentally killed a person in the line of duty, he refuses to carry a gun. He is newly married in the second book and fathers two children over the course of the series. In The Fire Engine That Disappeared, he refers to Gunvald Larsson as "the stupidest detective in the history of criminal investigation", and in The Abominable Man, Larsson informs him, "I've always thought you were a fucking idiot". Through working with each other on numerous investigations, they later come to understand each other. He resigns from the force at the end of the penultimate book, Cop Killer. He realises he was ashamed of what the police force had become, but still has the last word in the last book.

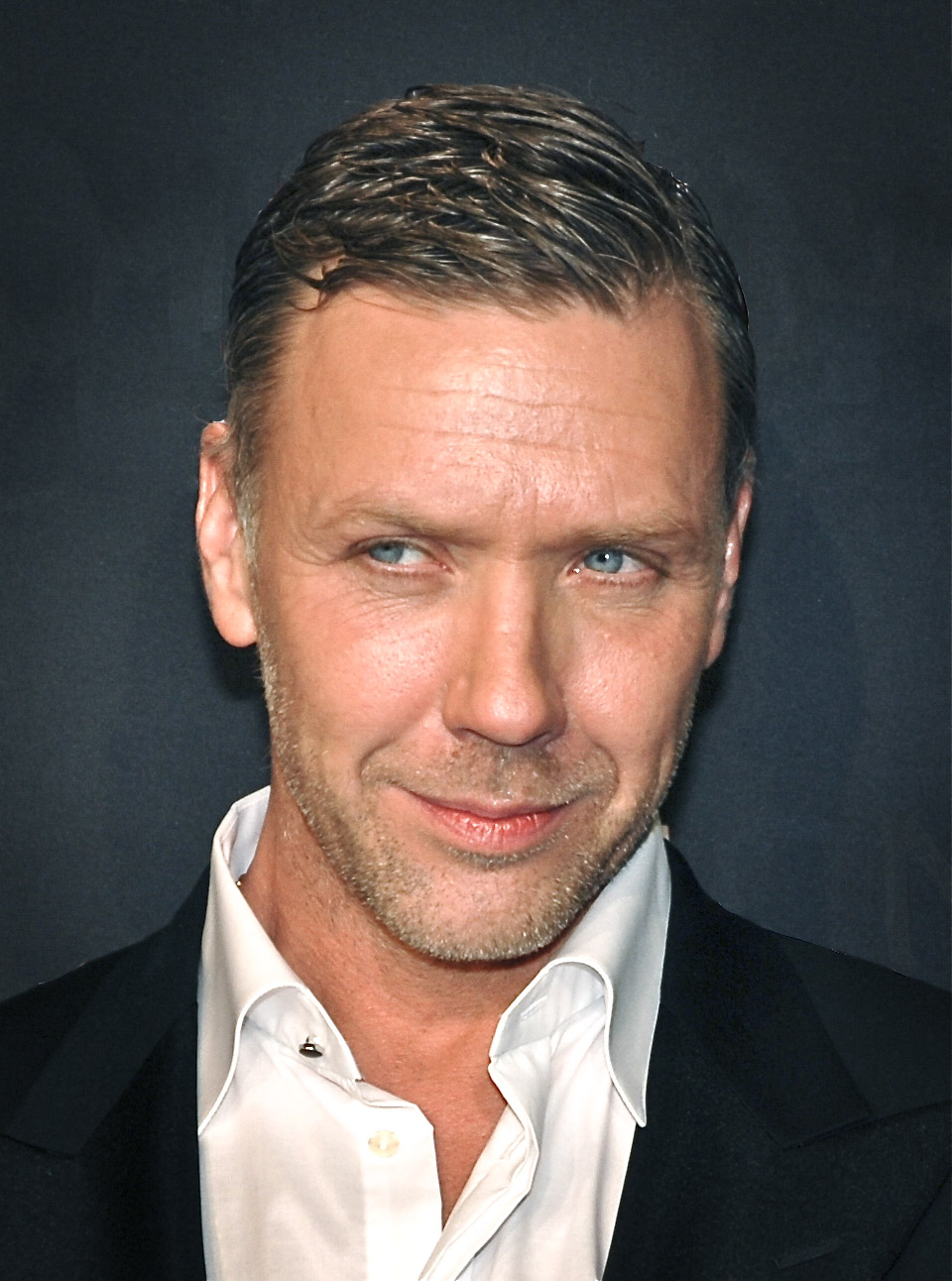
Mikael Persbrandt who played Larsson in the 1997-2015 film series.

Gunvald Larsson: A former member of the merchant marine and the black sheep of a rich family, he has a liking for expensive clothes and pulp fiction including the work of Sax Rohmer. He is one of the few people outside East Germany who owns and drives a sports car manufactured by Eisenacher Motorenwerk. He is somewhat lacking in interpersonal skills and is disliked by most of his colleagues. He and Kollberg share a mutual antipathy, but are capable of working together efficiently when the occasion demands it. However, although he often treats Einar Rönn with the same boorishness, Rönn is his only friend. The two are close, often spending time together off the job. His rich, cultured family taught him how to behave correctly in all circumstances, something which the Commissioner notes that he tries to conceal. Larsson has a penchant for expensive clothes, and his tailored suits frequently get ruined during his investigations. He is tall and has china blue eyes, and is in extremely good shape. He is noted as the best in the team at breaking down doors.

Einar Rönn: Larsson's friend from Arjeplog in the rural north of Sweden, he is married to a Lapp woman. He is permanently red-nosed, incapable of writing a coherent report and totally unimaginative, but a hard-working and efficient policeman. He is very calm and peaceful, losing his temper only once (on Larsson's behalf) in all the books. By the end of the series, Beck notes that Rönn had defied all expectations to become a valuable asset to the team, and someone whom he could trust.

Benny Skacke: A young ambitious, overzealous and sometimes hapless detective. He is introduced in the fifth book as a new member of the homicide commission, but later transfers to Malmö for personal reasons. Skacke is still somewhat naïve, seeking to become police commissioner, but he is noted by Beck in the last book as having matured significantly.

Fredrik Melander: Noted for his flawless memory and for always being in the lavatory when anyone wants him. Melander is described as a first-class policeman in The Fire Engine That Disappeared, but also as very boring. He insists on getting ten hours of sleep every night and has illegible handwriting. He is noted for having no temper displays and being immune to flattery. He later transfers to the Burglary and Theft division in an effort to avoid overtime. After, he is featured briefly in the later books in the series (except The Terrorists). In the Terrorists, Beck puts him in charge of telephone communications for his skill in having a long conversation with someone and getting nothing done.

Evald Hammar: Beck's boss until he retires in the end of The Fire Engine That Disappeared. He is mild-mannered, trusts his men's judgment, and dislikes the political infighting which increasingly accompanies his job.

Stig Malm: Beck's boss from Murder at the Savoy onwards. A politician with little understanding of police work who is willing to do anything to get up the career ladder, for whom Beck eventually feels sorry by the end of the book. Malm is often ordered around by the National Police Commissioner. He has an overly high opinion of himself, not hampered by his one case as Chief of Operations ending in disaster.

=== Other characters ===
Kurt Kvant and Karl Kristiansson
Lazy and inept partner patrolmen from Skåne who are shouted at by Larsson. At one point their trampling all over a crime scene resulted in a lengthy investigation, as no footprints or fingerprints could be taken at the scene. After Kvant is killed in The Abominable Man, Kristiansson has a new partner, Kenneth Kvastmo, who is equally inept but far more zealous.

Per Månsson
A leisurely but very competent Malmö detective who becomes involved in several of Beck's cases. He is particularly known for his searching skills.

Åke Stenström
A young detective noted for his shadowing skills. He is killed in The Laughing Policeman.

Åsa Torell
Widow of Åke Stenström, who later decides to become a cop herself. She appears prominently in Murder at the Savoy and The Terrorists.

=== Minor recurring characters ===
Aldor Gustavsson
A mediocre policeman, who bungles the initial investigation in The Locked Room.

Backlund
An unimaginative and rigid detective in Malmö.

Inga Beck
Martin Beck's wife, whom he later divorces.

Ingrid Beck
Martin Beck's daughter, often described as mature and independent. She has a good relationship with her father, and they often go out for dinner together. She urges Beck to leave her mother Inga.

Rolf Beck
Martin Beck's lazy son, with whom he has a poor relationship. Beck finally admits to himself in a later book that he dislikes the boy.

Rune Ek
One of the detectives. The character is usually minor, but appears more prominently in The Laughing Policeman.

Emil Elofsson and Gustav Borglund
Two partner patrolmen in Malmö. They appear in The Fire Engine that Disappeared and Cop Killer. In the later book, Borglund is killed by a wasp.

Norman Hansson
A uniformed police sergeant in some of the books.

Oskar Hjelm
A highly skilled but vain and temperamental forensic scientist, who is highly susceptible to flattery. Beck uses this weakness on a daily basis.

Gun Kollberg
Kollberg's young wife and mother of his two children.

Rhea Nielsen
Martin Beck's new girlfriend after he divorces his wife. She is an open socialist, and enjoys cooking. The series ends with Kollberg and his wife Gun, and Beck and Nielson having a happy New Years' party, in a perfect atmosphere with Nielsen's delicious cooking. She is a landlady, having inherited a block of apartments. Unlike many other landlords, she takes good care of the property, and builds a social community around her apartments. She charges less rent than average, and has them well refurbished. She meets Beck in The Locked Room, as the ex-landlady of the deceased man. Intelligent and straight-talking, she is a professional social worker.

Herrgott Nöjd (Herrgott Allwright or Herrgott Content in English translations)
A down-to-earth police officer from the rural district of Anderslöv, who gets on well with just about anybody. Appears in the books Cop Killer and The Terrorists.

Sten Robert "Bulldozer" Olsson
A very busy, energetic and enthusiastic public prosecutor in charge of investigating and prosecuting bank robbers. He has a big part in The Locked Room, where several fiascos occur under his watch when he insists on personally overseeing the investigation. He is known for being so busy, with often 10 cases at once, that he never appeals a case after losing, which he rarely does.

Strömgren
A Stockholm detective with a minor role in some of the books. Little is known about him, but he is disliked by both Beck and Larsson. In The Terrorists he apparently is a spy for Bulldozer Olsson.

Richard Ullholm
A pedantic and nit-picking detective in some of the books. He is constantly making official complaints about his colleagues over usually minor details.

Bo Zachrisson
Another mediocre policeman, who appears in The Fire Engine That Disappeared and later lets the Prime Minister get assassinated in The Terrorists. Eric Möller, the chief of Security Police, mistakes Larsson's "CS" (meaning Clod Squad) list of policemen who should not be used for any important duties, as the "Commando Section".

== Film adaptations ==
All ten novels have been adapted to film. Some have been released under different titles and four have been filmed outside Sweden. The first actor to play Martin Beck was Keve Hjelm in 1967. Carl-Gustaf Lindstedt portrayed Beck in 1976.

In 1993 and 1994, Gösta Ekman played the character in six films. American audiences are likely most familiar with Walter Matthau playing the Beck role in the 1973 film called The Laughing Policeman, where his character was called "Jake Martin."

Martin Beck has also been played by Jan Decleir, Derek Jacobi and Romualds Ancāns. Two of the novels, Roseanna and Murder at the Savoy, have each twice been adapted for films. In the later TV series films based more on the named characters than events, Martin Beck is played by Peter Haber.

=== Independent films ===
- 1967 – Roseanna (Sw) (based on Roseanna, starring Keve Hjelm)
- 1973 – The Laughing Policeman (US) (based on The Laughing Policeman, starring Walter Matthau; the setting is changed to San Francisco and the characters have different names)
- 1976 – Mannen på taket ("The man on the roof") (Sw) (based on The Abominable Man, starring Carl-Gustaf Lindstedt)
- 1979 – Nezakonchennyy uzhin ("The unfinished supper") (USSR) (based on Murder at the Savoy, starring Romualds Ancāns (lv)
- 1980 – Der Mann, der sich in Luft auflöste ("The man who disappeared into thin air") (Ger) (based on The Man Who Went Up in Smoke, starring British actor Derek Jacobi)
- 1993 – Beck – De gesloten kamer ("Beck- the closed room") (Neth) (based on The Locked Room, starring Jan Decleir)

=== Films with Gösta Ekman ===
- 1993 – Roseanna (based on Roseanna)
- 1993 – Brandbilen som försvann (based on The Fire Engine That Disappeared)
- 1993 – Polis polis potatismos! (based on Murder at the Savoy)
- 1993 – Mannen på balkongen (based on The Man on the Balcony)
- 1994 – Polismördaren (based on Cop Killer)
- 1994 – Stockholm Marathon (loosely based on The Terrorists)

== BBC Radio 4 adaptations ==
The BBC dramatised the ten stories for radio and broadcast began in October 2012 on BBC Radio 4 under the umbrella title of The Martin Beck Killings.

The series stars Steven Mackintosh as Beck, Neil Pearson as Kollberg, Ralph Ineson as Larsson, Russell Boulter as Rönn, and Adrian Scarborough as Melander.

- 1 – Roseanna (27 October 2012)
- 2 – The Man who Went Up in Smoke (3 November 2012)
- 3 – The Man on the Balcony (10 November 2012)
- 4 – The Laughing Policeman (17 November 2012)
- 5 – The Fire Engine That Disappeared (24 November 2012)
- 6 – Murder at the Savoy (6 July 2013)
- 7 – The Abominable Man (13 July 2013)
- 8 – The Locked Room (20 July 2013)
- 9 – Cop Killer (27 July 2013)
- 10 – The Terrorists (3 August 2013)

== Impact ==
Sjöwall and Wahlöö's technique of mixing traditional crime fiction with a focus on the social issues in the Swedish welfare state received a great deal of attention. The concept has been updated in the 1990s with Henning Mankell's detective character Kurt Wallander and in the 2000s with Stieg Larsson's Millennium trilogy featuring Lisbeth Salander. The basic concept has, by extension, given rise to the entire Scandinavian noir scene. The Mystery Writers of America, in 1995, rated The Laughing Policeman as the 2nd best police procedural, after Tony Hillerman's Dance Hall of the Dead.
