= Maj Sjöwall =

Swedish author and translator (1935–2020)

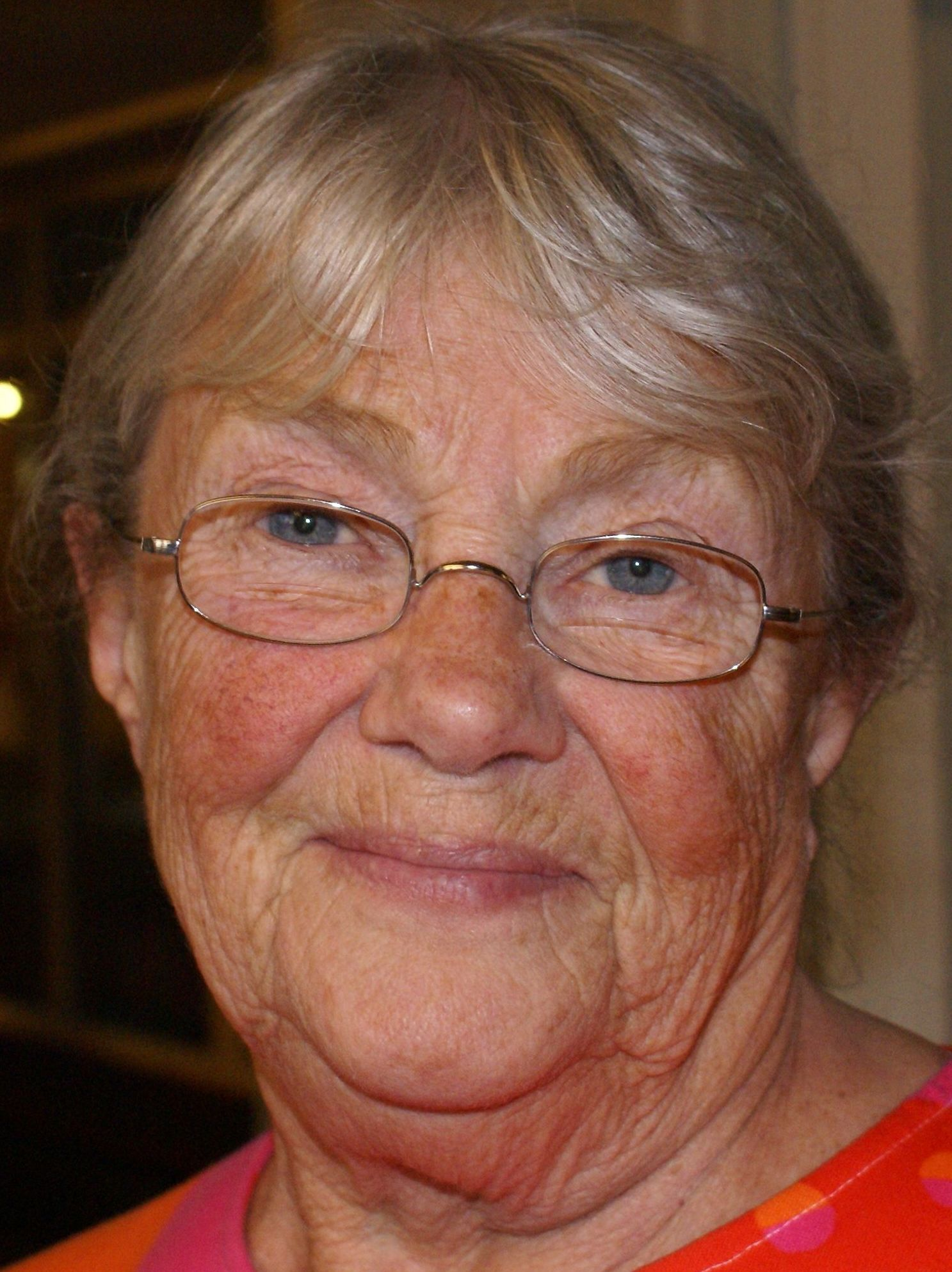
- Sjöwall at a crime fiction festival in Bremen, Germany, in 2009
- Born: 25 September 1935; Stockholm, Sweden
- Died: 29 April 2020 (aged 84); Landskrona, Sweden
- Occupations: Novelist, Translator
- Partner: Per Wahlöö
- Writing career
- Language: Swedish
- Period: 1965–2007
- Genre: Crime fiction
- Notable work: Martin Beck novels
- Notable awards: The Lenin Award; Adolf-Grimme-Preis (1996, shared with Gösta Ekman)
- Literary movement: Nordic noir

Maj Sjöwall (Swedish pronunciation: [maj ˈɧø̂ːval]; 25 September 1935 – 29 April 2020) was a Swedish author and translator. She is best known for her novels about the police detective Martin Beck. She wrote these novels in collaborative work with her partner Per Wahlöö.

== Biography ==
Maj Sjöwall was the daughter of Margit Trobäck and CEO Will Sjöwall.

After completing school, Sjöwall was employed at Åhlén & Åkerlunds publishers between 1954 and 1959; Wahlström & Widstrands publishers between 1959 and 1961; and then Esselte publishers between 1961 and 1963.

Sjöwall was best known for the collaborative work with her partner Per Wahlöö on a series of ten novels about the exploits of Martin Beck, a police detective in Stockholm. They also wrote several novels separately. The fourth of the Beck novels, Den skrattande polisen, was published in 1968; a translation of this novel, The Laughing Policeman, won an Edgar Allan Poe Award for Best Novel from the Mystery Writers of America in 1971. This novel was also adapted into the film The Laughing Policeman, starring Walter Matthau. In 2013, Sjöwall received a fifth Lenin Award.

After the death of Wahlöö, Sjöwall continued working as a translator, writing columns for magazines and as an author. With Danish author Bjarne Nielsen, she published the novel Dansk Intermezzo in 1989. In 1990, she and author Tomas Ross published the thriller Kvinnan som liknade Greta Garbo.

== Personal life ==
Sjöwall married her first husband, magazine editor Gunnar Isaksson, in 1955, and they divorced in 1958. She married again in 1959 to photographer Hans J. Flodquist; they divorced in 1962.

Sjöwall had a 13-year relationship with Wahlöö, which lasted until his death in 1975.

Sjöwall died on 29 April 2020, at the age of 84, after a prolonged illness.

== Bibliography ==
=== Martin Beck novels written with Per Wahlöö ===
- Roseanna (1965)
- Mannen som gick upp i rök (1966)
- Mannen på balkongen (1967)
- Den skrattande polisen (1968)
- Brandbilen som försvann (1969)
- Polis, polis, potatismos (1970)
- Den vedervärdige mannen från Säffle (1971)
- Det slutna rummet (1972)
- Polismördaren (1974)
- Terroristerna (1975)

=== Other books ===
- Dansk Intermezzo (1989). Martin Beck novel written with Bjarne Nielsen.
- Kvinnan som liknade Greta Garbo (1990). Written jointly with Tomas Ross.
- Sista resan och andra berättelser (2007). Collection of short stories written by Sjöwall and Wahlöö.

=== Adaptations ===
The novels about Martin Beck were adapted into several successful films, and Beck has been portrayed by several of Sweden's best-known actors. The best-known portrayal of Beck is by actor Peter Haber, who has appeared in 42 films or TV episodes in the role.
