= Carl-Gustaf Lindstedt =

Swedish actor

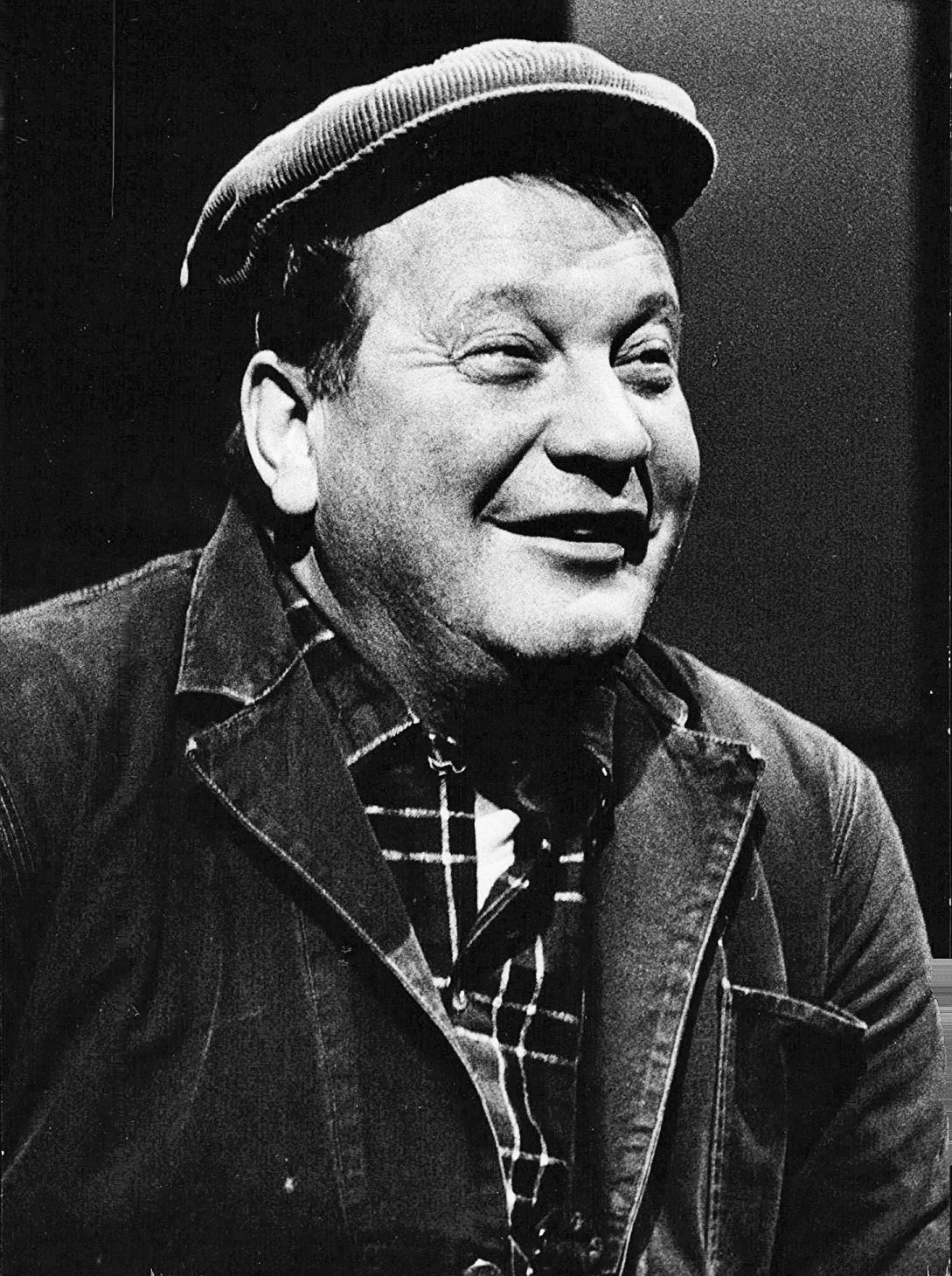
- Carl-Gustaf Lindstedt at the Maxim Theatre in Stockholm, Sweden 1968
- Born: 24 February 1921; Stockholm, Sweden
- Died: 16 January 1992 (aged 70); Stockholm, Sweden
- Occupations: Actor; comedian
- Years active: 1944–1992
- Spouse: Tully Johansson (m. 1943)
- Children: 3, including Pierre Lindstedt

Carl-Gustaf Lindstedt (24 February 1921 – 16 January 1992) was a Swedish comedian and actor.

== History ==
He grew up in Kungsholmen in Stockholm, where there now is a street named after him. His father was a Social Democratic politician and Carl-Gustaf started his acting in a socialist youth theater club. From the 1940s, he was associated at the Casinorevyn ensemble at Casinoteatern on Bryggargatan in Stockholm. Lindstedt quickly became one of the crowd favorites at the theater. Here he met Arne Kallerud (1913–1981), who became Lindstedt's stage partner in many revues, films and radio shows. Their radio series became a success in the late 1950s. In 1957, Lindstedt and Kallerud started their own theater: Nöjeskatten at Södermalm, Stockholm. They operated the theater until the mid-1960s.

Lindstedt is mostly known for being a comedian but he has also been in many dramas. His films include What Are You Doing After the Orgy? and The Man on the Roof where he played the detective Martin Beck. At the 7th Guldbagge Awards he won the award for Best Actor for his role in Harry Munter.

== Personal life ==
Carl-Gustaf Lindstedt was married in 1943 to Tully Johansson (1921–2003). Together they had three children, Pierre Lindstedt (born 1943), Pia Lindstedt (born 1949) and Peggy Lindstedt (born 1958).
