= The Man Who Went Up in Smoke =

1966 novel by Maj Sjöwall and Per Wahlöö

- First English edition
- Author: Maj Sjöwall and Per Wahlöö
- Original title: Mannen som gick upp i rök
- Translator: Joan Tate
- Language: Swedish
- Series: Martin Beck series
- Genre: Nordic Noir
- Publisher: Norstedts Förlag (Swedish); Pantheon Books (English)
- Publication date: 1966
- Publication place: Sweden
- English publication date: 1969
- Pages: 189
- Preceded by: Roseanna
- Followed by: The Man on the Balcony

The Man Who Went Up in Smoke (original title: Mannen som gick upp i rök) is a mystery novel by Swedish writers Maj Sjöwall and Per Wahlöö, published in 1966. It is part of their detective series revolving around Martin Beck and his team. In the novel, Beck returns to work and travels to Hungary to search for a missing journalist called Alf Matsson. After meeting the Budapest police and the criminal underground, he begins to wonder if Matsson ever entered the country.

== Plot summary ==
The novel, set in the 1960s, is about a Swedish journalist called Alf Matsson, who disappeared without a trace in Hungary. He was commissioned by a Swedish newspaper to fly to Budapest to conduct an interview with a boxer and report on political events. Since Matsson has not reported for a week, the hotel he is staying in reports to the case to the Ministry of Foreign Affairs. However, the case must be handled discreetly because the Ministry fear political entanglements. The Stockholm police is tasked with finding the missing reporter, and send Martin Beck, who sacrifices his vacation to go to Budapest.

Beck finds in the Budapest Hotel that Matsson left the hotel without a passport and luggage on the day of his arrival, and since then has been unseen. The Hungarian police are not willing to do much, but Martin Beck then meets a Hungarian policeman who helps him with the case. Since there is neither evidence nor any trace of Matsson, Beck does not know what to do. But one night he is attacked on the riverside by unknown people. He survives thanks to the Budapest Police and the perpetrators are caught.

== Characters ==
Beck and Kollberg have their first, short run-in with detective Backlund of the Malmö police force, who lacks the imagination required for his line of work, for which he thinks bureaucracy is a replacement. Also while in Malmö they meet Per Månsson for the first time, he will have a larger role in later books

Einar Rönn is mentioned for the first time but will not appear until the next novel.

It might be argued that Beck and his wife are already getting estranged. It only takes the flimsiest amounts of passive-aggressiveness from his superiors to make him give up his holiday, even though both make clear to him that he does not have to go if he does not want to. Although he reflects on his marriage several times (as does the narrator on marriage in general), he does not draw any conclusions yet.

== Film adaptation ==
The novel was adapted to film in 1980. The film was in Hungarian and Derek Jacobi played the role of Martin Beck.

| Preceded by Roseanna | "Martin Beck" timeline, part 2 of 10 | Succeeded by The Man on the Balcony |
