= Sigrid Combüchen =

Swedish writer

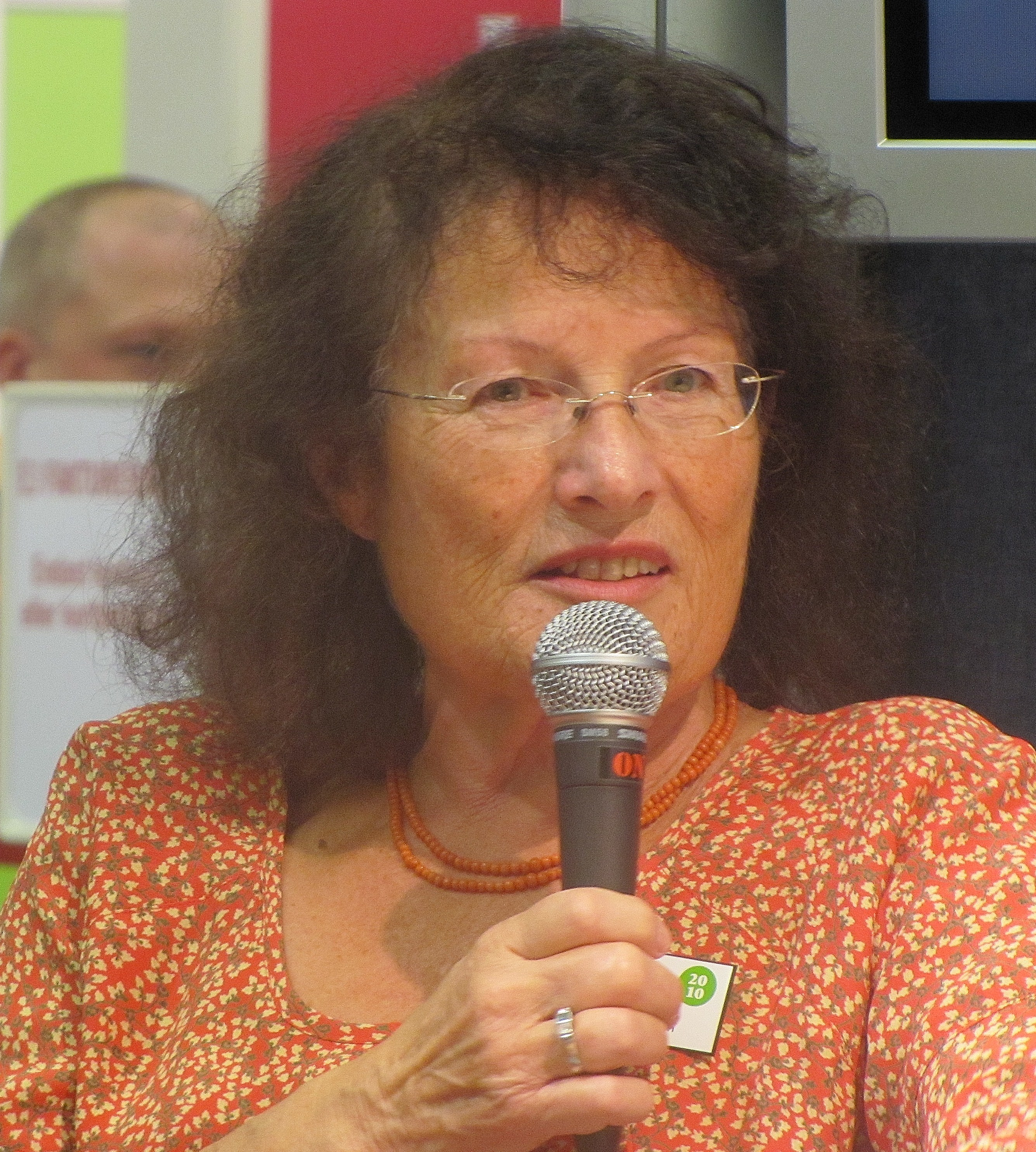
Sigrid Combüchen in 2010.

Sigrid Combüchen (born 16 January 1942) is a Swedish novelist, essayist, literary critic and journalist.

== Career ==
Sigrid Combüchen was born in Solingen, Germany in the Ruhr territory. Shortly after the War her family moved to Sweden.

Sigrid Combüchen made her debut at the age of eighteen with the novel Ett rumsrent sällskap (1960). She worked in journalism and on her academic degree before she returned to fiction seventeen years later with the novel I norra Europa (In Northern Europe) and then Värme (Warmth) in 1980. Her first internationally renowned novel is Byron, published in 1988. The book paints a picture of the English poet through a compositional change between present and past, where Byron is partly illustrated by a group of Byron enthusiasts of today and partly through the environment in his own time. It was translated into other languages including English, German, French, Spanish and Dutch the following years. Over a period of twenty years Combüchen has written three novels studying the change of mentality in national life. She has used themes of saga, as well as fantasy in i.e. Parsifal (1998), a dystopian novel drawing on the medieval story. Her novel Spill. En damroman (Scraps. A Lady's novel) 2010, was translated into many languages and awarded several prizes, most importantly the Swedish August Prize for best novel of the year. Her latest novel Sidonie & Nathalie (2017) is a story of two French refugees surviving in the Swedish countryside during 1944–45. It is soon to be presented in a stage version. She has also written a few biographies, among them an essayistic account of the life and work of Knut Hamsun. She was one of the editors of the magazine Allt om Böcker for a number of years and has been a contributor to several other literary magazines and to several newspapers on a regular basis.

Between 2004 and 2017 she was a teacher of creative writing at Lund University. She has served on several boards and committees in Swedish, as well as Nordic literary and academic organisations.

== Awards ==
She received the 2004 Selma Lagerlöf Prize and in 2007 she received an Honorary Doctorate in Literature at Lund University, Sweden, for her literary merits. In 2010, she received the August Prize for the novel Spill: En damroman (Scraps. A Lady's novel).

== Bibliography ==
- Ett rumsrent sällskap, 1960 ISBN 9789100137526
- I norra Europa, 1977 ISBN 9789174580662
- Värme, 1980 ISBN 9789113039794
- Byron, 1988 ISBN 978-91-1-300865-3
- Korta och långa kapitel, 1992 ISBN 9789113039336
- Om en dag man vaknar. Essayer, 1995 ISBN 9119422113
- Parsifal, 1998 ISBN 978-91-1-303937-4
- En simtur i sundet, 2003 ISBN 978-91-1-303935-0
- Livsklättraren. En bok om Knut Hamsun, 2006 ISBN 978-91-0-010589-1
- Spill: En damroman, 2010 ISBN 978-91-1-302988-7
- Den umbärliga, 2014 ISBN 978-91-1-305597-8
- Sidonie & Nathalie – från Limhamn till Lofoten, 2017 ISBN 978-91-1-307896-0
