= The Locked Room =

1972 novel by Maj Sjöwall and Per Wahlöö

- First Swedish edition
- Author: Maj Sjöwall and Per Wahlöö
- Original title: Det slutna rummet
- Translator: Paul Britten Austin
- Language: Swedish
- Series: Martin Beck series
- Publisher: Norstedts Förlag (Swedish); Pantheon Books (English)
- Publication date: 1972
- Publication place: Sweden
- English publication date: 1973
- Pages: 291
- ISBN: 91-1-725301-2
- OCLC: 11577021
- LC Class: PT9876.29.J63 S54
- Preceded by: The Abominable Man
- Followed by: Cop Killer

The Locked Room (original Swedish title: Det slutna rummet) is a mystery novel by Swedish writers Maj Sjöwall and Per Wahlöö, published in 1972. It is part of their detective series revolving around Martin Beck and his team.

The Locked Room has two plots running simultaneously. Larsson and Kollberg are extremely reluctantly part of a special task force that needs to solve a spree of bank robberies. Martin Beck is given a pity job after recovering from being shot at the conclusion of The Abominable Man; he needs to solve a classic situation of the genre: the locked room mystery.

The incompetence of the Swedish police force has spread to the point that all three detectives are severely hindered in their work. One criminal walks free for a heinous crime he did commit, then has to do hard time for a crime he did not.

== Plot summary ==
The story begins with Beck recovered after his injury sustained at the end of the previous book and now returning to the National Police Bureau; he discovers that the police force still is amateurish and unprofessional for the most part, which he was accustomed to previously. Patrolmen have found a highly decomposed corpse (as it turns out later, a murdered man—found in a locked from inside apartment. An incompetent detective, Aldor Gustavsson, had the case shelved as suicide. No one was much disturbed by the fact that the weapon had not been found in the apartment.

The novel now has two storylines: the locked room investigation and the bank robbery specialists.

The latter take by accident the petty criminal Mauritzon, a mate of Malmström and Mohrén, and accuse him of a bank robbery in which a bank customer was shot. At the same time Martin Beck solves the locked room mystery- the gun was shot from outside by Maurtizon, when the window was open. The window had fallen so that the latch had closed by itself.

Since the evidence collected by Martin Beck is insufficient, Mauritzon is acquitted of murder; but for the bank robbery, of which he is innocent, but whose evidence he cannot refute, he is sentenced to manslaughter with lifetime imprisonment.

The bank robbers pursued by Attorney Olsson manage to fool the police (the robbery does not occur in Stockholm, but in Malmö instead).

During the investigation, Beck, in a depressive phase of his life, meets a woman named Rhea Nielsen and he finds new courage which in the following novels plays an important role.

== Characters ==
Beck meets Rhea Nielsen, and it is love at first sight, sort of, in slow motion. Contrary to his ex-wife, she is a no-nonsense left-wing type of person and his intellectual equal.

Criminal mastermind Werner Roos and bank robbers Malmström and Mohrén are introduced, as is their ineffectual but successful Nemesis, public prosecutor 'Bulldozer' Olsson.

Police officer Kenneth Kvastmo is introduced to replace Kurt Kvant as Police officer Karl Kristianssons partner.

== Film adaptation ==
The book was adapted by Dutch filmmaker Jacob Bijl as De gesloten kamer in 1993. In this film, the action is set in Antwerp and Beck is played by famous Belgian actor Jan Decleir. Most of the other characters were renamed to match the new setting; for instance, the name of Beck's colleague Kollberg was changed to Colbert.

Preceded by The Abominable Man	"Martin Beck" timeline, part 8 of 10	Succeeded by Cop Killer
