= Norstedts förlag =

Swedish publishing company

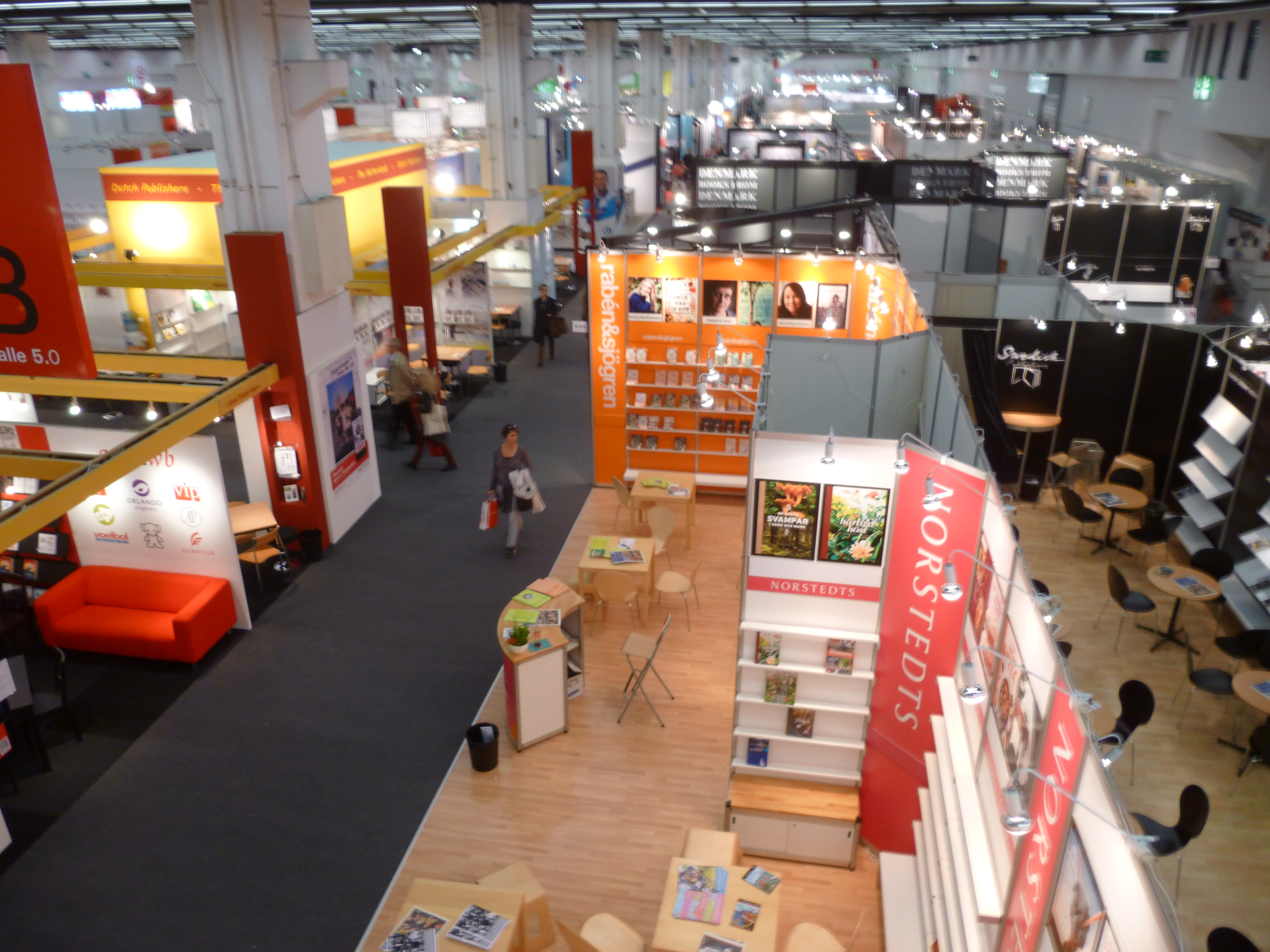
- Norstedts Förlag's booth at the Frankfurt Book Fair, 2012
- Parent company: Storytel
- Founded: 1823
- Founder: Per Adolf Norstedt
- Country of origin: Sweden
- Headquarters location: Stockholm
- Publication types: Books
- Imprints: Rabén & Sjögren
- Official website: www.norstedtsforlag.se

Norstedts Förlag is a book publishing company in Sweden. Norstedts is Sweden's oldest publishing house and one of the largest in the country. It was founded in 1823 by Per Adolf Norstedt, under the name P. A. Norstedt & Söner ("P. A. Norstedt & Sons").

== History ==
The publishing company began by Per Adolf Norstedt purchasing J. P. Lindh's widow's printing company in 1821. This company had its roots in the Royal Printing firm, founded in 1526. Per Adolf Norstedt brought his sons Carl and Adolf into the business in 1823, and the company took the name of P. A. Norstedt & Söner. The company became responsible for Royal publications ten years later.

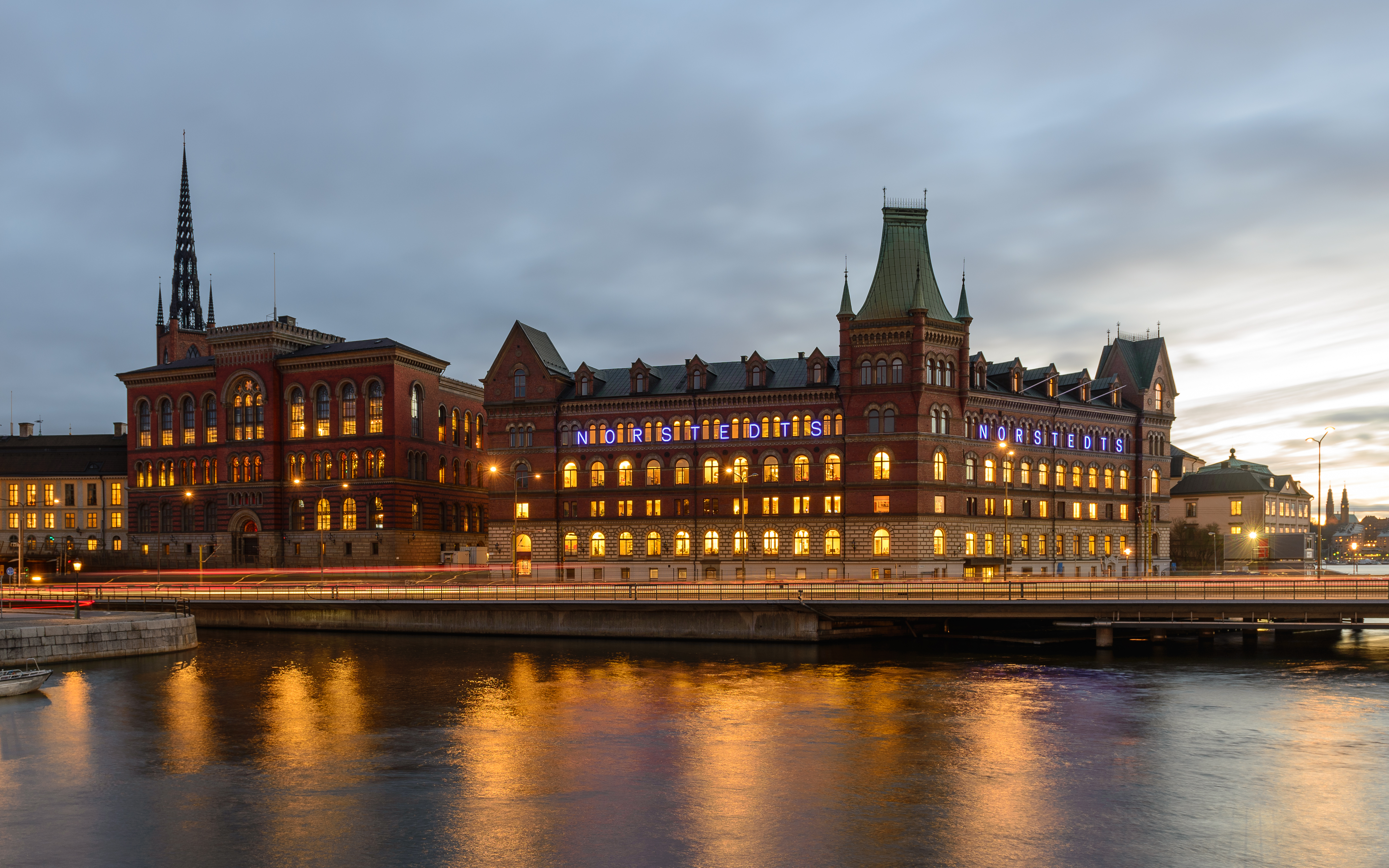
Norstedts building on Riddarholmen

As neither son had an heir, the company was later administered by Emilia Nostedt, a niece of Per Adolf, and married to the wholesaler Gustaf Philip Laurin (1808–1859). After he died the company was managed by their sons Gösta Laurin (1836–1879), Carl Laurin (1840–1917) and Albert Laurin (1842–1878). Carl Laurin, a civil engineer, developed the company's technical and printing capabilities and was also the chief financial officer.

== Publishing ==
Norstedts Publishing Group consists of Norstedts, which publishes both fiction and non-fiction, and since 1998, Rabén & Sjögren, which publishes children's books. Several publishers such as Prisma, Nautiska Förlaget, Norstedts Akademiska, Tivoli, Eriksson & Lindgren, Tiden and Gammafon, that joined the group through mergers, acquisitions, etc, operated under their own names until 2009. Some earlier trading names, such as AWE/Gebers and PAN, are now defunct.

The Group has over 100 employees, published about 400 books in 2013 and has an annual turnover of approx 40 000 EUR. It is also the owner and part-owner of a number of book clubs.

Norstedts Publishing Group was owned by the Cooperative Association (KF), until June 2016 when Storytel, a digital subscription service acquired the Norstedts Publishing Group for 152 million SEK on 22 June 2016. The publishing house is based at Norstedtshuset at Riddarholmen in central Stockholm. Otto Sjöberg is the CEO since 1 August 2014.

Swedish-language writers published by Norstedts Publishing Group (or imprints) include Hjalmar Gullberg, Maria Lang, Stig Dagerman, Birgitta Stenberg, Pär Rådström, Elsa Grave, Ingmar Bergman, Per Olov Enquist, Agneta Pleijel, Torgny Lindgren, Astrid Lindgren, Barbro Lindgren, August Strindberg, Henning Mankell, Sigrid Combüchen, Anders Ehnmark, Mikael Niemi, Majgull Axelsson, Torbjörn Flygt, Carl Henning Wijkmark, Jonas Hassen Khemiri, Frans G. Bengtsson, Kjell Espmark, Per Odensten, Jonas Gardell, and Stieg Larsson.

Foreign authors include Nobel Prize laureates Mario Vargas Llosa, Jean-Marie Gustave Le Clézio, Orhan Pamuk, Imre Kertész and Bob Dylan. Other authors include Graham Greene, E. L. James, Michael Connelly, Suzanne Brøgger, J. R. R. Tolkien, Isabel Allende and J. K. Rowling.

Book series published by Norstedts include the Millennium series of Swedish crime novels.
