= Per Wahlöö =

Swedish writer

- Born: Per Fredrik Wahlöö; 5 August 1926; Kungsbacka Municipality, Sweden
- Died: 22 June 1975 (aged 48); Malmö, Sweden
- Occupations: Novelist, crime reporter
- Partner: Maj Sjöwall
- Writing career
- Pen name: Peter Wahloo
- Genre: Crime fiction
- Notable work: Martin Beck
- Notable awards: The Laughing Policeman (1971) Edgar Award (Best Novel)

Per Fredrik Wahlöö (5 August 1926 – 22 June 1975), often identified in English translations as Peter Wahloo – was a Swedish author. He is perhaps best known for collaborative work with his partner Maj Sjöwall on a series of ten novels about the exploits of Martin Beck, a police detective in Stockholm, published between 1965 and 1975. The fourth of the Beck novels, Den skrattande polisen, was published in 1968; a translation of this novel, The Laughing Policeman, won an Edgar Allan Poe Award for Best Novel from the Mystery Writers of America in 1971. Wahlöö and Sjöwall also wrote novels separately.

Wahlöö was born in Tölö parish, Kungsbacka Municipality, Halland, Sweden. Following secondary school, he worked as a crime reporter from 1946 onwards. After long trips around the world, he returned to Sweden and started working as a journalist again.

He had a thirteen-year relationship with Sjöwall, but they never married, as he already was married. Both writers were Marxists.

== Biography ==
Wahlöö's career in journalism started in 1947 at the Sydsvenskan newspaper in Malmö and continued in 1949 at the new Evening Post, where he was a permanent employee until 1953. He moved on to freelance work in the 1950s, writing theatre reviews and film articles for various newspapers, including newspapers in Norrköping, before moving to Stockholm. By May 1964, Per Wahlöö's journalistic career was said to be complete. Subsequently, he was involved with the New Left journal Tidsignal (Time Signal) (1965–1970), where he was part of the editorial board, which included the writer Kurt Salomonson.

A leftist tendency and dramatically effective narrative distinguished Wahlöö's early novels about power and justice; examples include A Necessary Action (1962), which depicts Franco's Spain, and his Dictatorship series. Starting in the mid-1960s, he and his life companion Maj Sjöwall co-wrote a series of detective novels with criminal investigator Martin Beck as the protagonist. Several of these novels have been filmed.

A Swedish TV film series began running in 1997, with Peter Haber playing Martin Beck. The series was bought by the BBC in 2015, and it was shown in the United Kingdom with English subtitles.

Per Wahlöö died in Malmö in 1975, after an unsuccessful operation to remove cancer from his pancreas. He is interred in the memorial garden at the central cemetery of St. Paul's Church in Malmö.

== Bibliography ==
The novels written by Per Wahlöö only are listed below. (See Martin Beck for the collaboration with Maj Sjöwall)

- The Chief (1959)
- The Wind and Rain (1961)
- A Necessary Action (1962)
- The Assignment (1963)
- No Roses Grow on Odenplan (1964)
- Murder on the Thirty-First Floor (1966)
- The Steel Spring (1968)
- The Generals (1974)

== Legacy ==
He has been described as part of "the couple who invented Nordic noir", and he is credited as one of the main inspirations for the Norwegian writer Jo Nesbø.
