= Carla Sehn =

Swedish actress

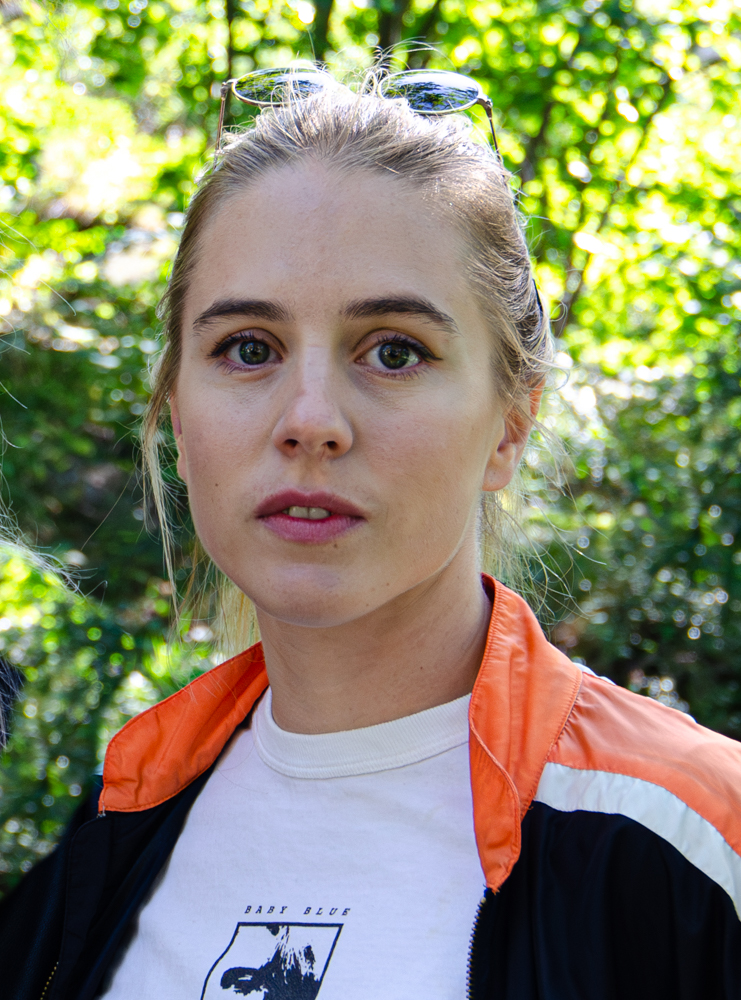
- Sehn (2023)
- Born: August 1, 1994 (age 31); Stockholm, Sweden
- Education: Lilla Akademien
- Occupation: Actress
- Television: The Åre Murders

Carla Sehn (born August 1, 1994) is a Swedish television actress. She had the lead role in the limited series The Åre Murders (2025), adapted from novels of the same name by Viveca Sten.

== Early and personal life ==
Born in Stockholm, Sweden, to Polish parents, she attended Lilla Akademien music school, where she studied piano. She attended Stockholm School of Economics before moving to study psychology at the University of Exeter, in England. She speaks Swedish, Polish, and English.

== Career ==
She appeared as Caroline in the Swedish romantic comedy series Love & Anarchy, created by Lisa Langseth. The first season premiered on 4 November 2020, the second on 16 June 2022. In 2021, she had the lead role in Sick (Swedish title: Sjukt) as a cancer survivor, Alice, rebuilding her life. She also appeared in a supporting role in Anxious People, as a prospective apartment hunter, Julia.

In 2022, she appeared in the television series Vuxna människor (Adult Behavior), a remake of the 1999 comedy film of the same name by Felix Herngren.

In 2024, she was cast in the lead role of Amanda in Malmö-set Diary of a Ditched Girl, written by Tove Eriksen Hillblom and Moa Herngren, and produced by Jarowskij. The series is based on Amanda Romares’s novel Halva Malmö and directed by Emma Bucht and Susanne Thorson.

She had the lead role of Hanna Ahlander in 2025 Netflix Nordic noir series The Åre Murders.

== Partial filmography ==
Key
†	Denotes works that have not yet been released

Year	Title	Role	Notes
2020-2022	Love & Anarchy	Caroline Dahl	16 episodes
2021	Sick	Alice	8 episodes
2021	Anxious People	Julia	6 episodes
2022	Vuxna människor	Mathilda	8 episodes
2025	The Åre Murders	Hanna Ahlander	5 episodes
2025	Diary of a Ditched Girl	Amanda	7 episodes
