= Ondskan =

Ondskan may refer to:

- Evil (novel) (Ondskan), a 1981 Swedish novel by Jan Guillou
- Evil (2003 film) (Ondskan), based on Guillou's novel
- Evil (Swedish TV series), (Ondskan), based on Guillou's novel
