= Love and Anarchy (disambiguation) =

Love and Anarchy is a 1973 film by Lina Wertmüller.

Love and Anarchy could also refer to the following:

- Anarchism and issues related to love and sex
- Love & Anarchy (TV series) (Kärlek och anarki), a Swedish TV series by Lisa Langseth
- Helsinki International Film Festival, in Finland, also known as "Love & Anarchy"
