= Lise Østergaard =

Danish government minister (1924–1996)

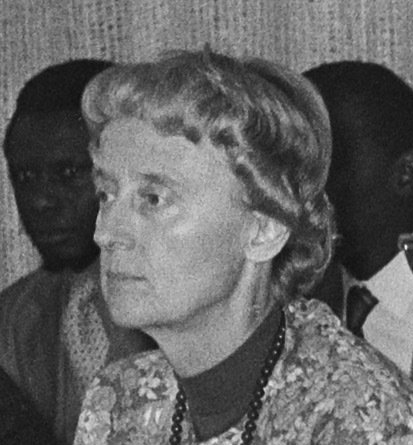
Lise Østergaard in 1978

Anna Elisabeth "Lise" Østergaard (18 November 1924 – 19 March 1996) was a Danish psychologist and a politician for the Social Democrats. Under Anker Jørgensen's leadership, she was Minister without Portfolio (1977–80) and Minister of Culture (1980–82). As a psychologist, she was head of psychology in Copenhagen's Rigshospitalet (1958) as well as the first woman to become professor of clinical psychology at the University of Copenhagen (1963), a position she resumed after her political career ended in the mid-1980s.

== Early life ==
Born on 18 November 1924 in Odense, Østergaard was the daughter of Alfred Østergaard (1890–1962) and his wife Martha Kirstine Nielsen (1885–1944). She spent her first 12 years in Odense before moving with her parents to Gentofte. Although she encountered difficulties at school, she finally embarked on psychology studies at the University of Copenhagen. On leaving home against her father's wishes, she paid her own way by working as a doctor's secretary.

== Career ==
=== Psychology ===
After graduating in 1947, Østergaard worked as a psychologist in Norrtulls sjukhus, a children's hospital in Stockholm. In 1949, she returned to Denmark, first spending a year in Dronning Louises Børnehospital (Queen Louise's Children's Hospital) before moving to the newly established children's psychology clinic at the University of Copenhagen where she remained until 1954. She then entered the Rigshospitalet's psychology department where she was appointed head psychologist in 1958, expanding her experience in clinical psychology. As a result, from 1955 to 1960 she headed a course in clinical psychology for the Dansk Psychologforening (Danish Psychologists Association) while teaching as the first woman psychologist at the university. She also took up assignments as a guest lecturer in Lund, Sweden, and Bergen, Norway.

Published in 1961, her Den psykologiske testmetode og dens relation til klinisk psykiatri (The Psychological Test Method and its Relationship to Clinical Psychiatry) raised considerable interest among psychiatrists. While working at Rigshospitalet, Østergaard treated a number of schizophrenic patients. In 1962, this led to her En psykologisk analyse af de formelle schizofrene tankeforstyrrelser (A Psychological Analysis of Formal Schizophrenic Thought Disorders), paving the way for research on the borderline between psychology and psychiatry in collaboration with the National Institute of Mental Health in the United States.

In 1963, Østergaard became the first female professor of psychology at the University of Copenhagen. After heading the Studenterrådgivningsklinikken (Student Advisory Clinic, 1964–68), she established the Institut for Klinisk Psykologi (Clinical Psychology Institute) in 1968. From 1970 to 1973, she was a member of Denmark's Unesco committee and from 1973 a member of Akademiet for de Tekniske Videnskaber (The Danish Academy of Technical Sciences).

=== Politics ===
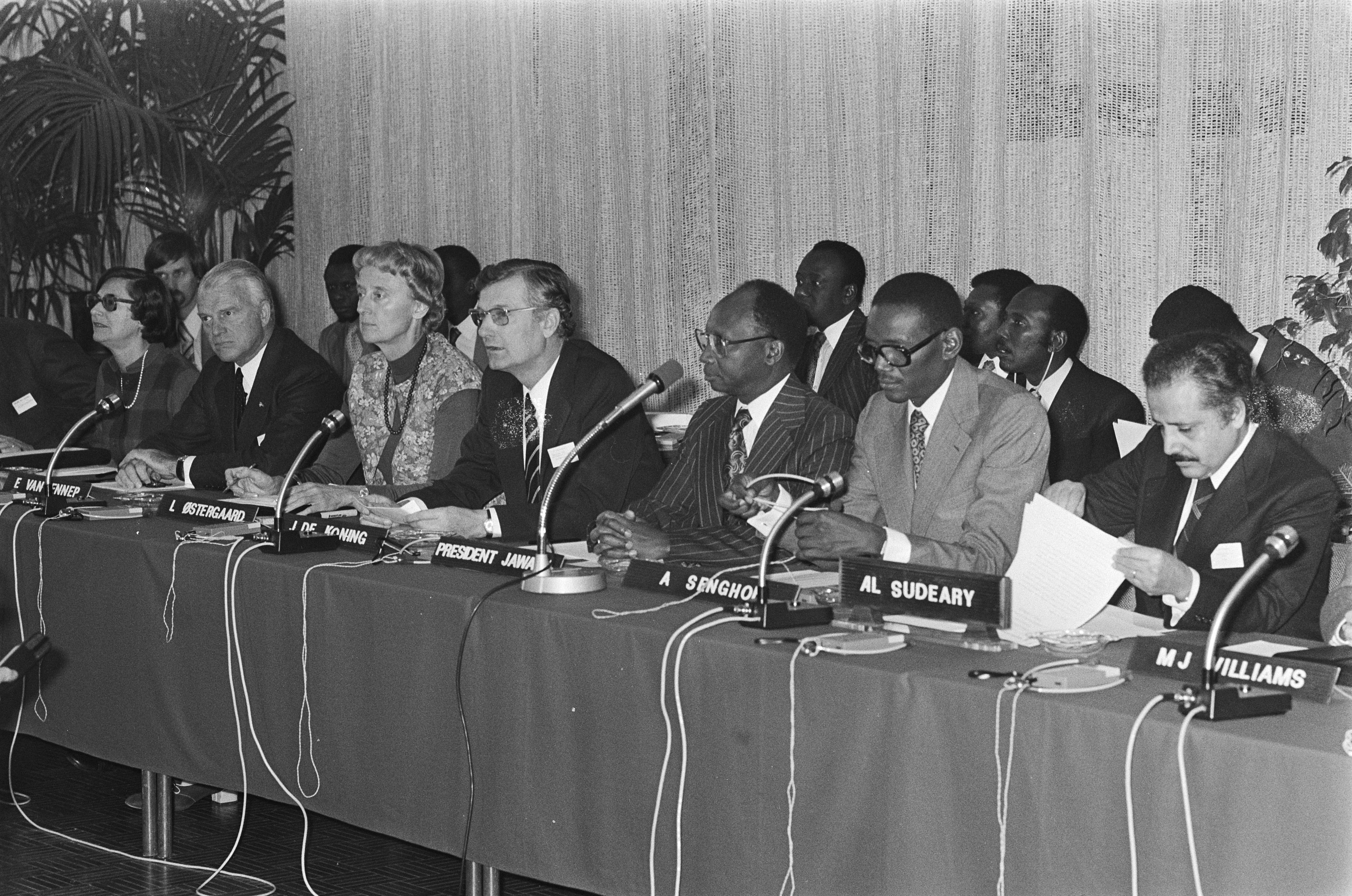
Lise Østergaard (third from left) in 1978

In the early 1970s, Østergaard became involved in the Danish Refugee Council, acting as spokesman from 1974 to 1977. She also increasingly became active in children's affairs, becoming spokesman for the Danish Children's Commission where she promoted the need for paternity leave. Her life underwent a significant change in 1977 when Anker Jørgensen offered her an appointment as Minister without Portfolio with special responsibilities for foreign affairs.

Although she had no political background, Østergaard was not afraid to criticize the West for fighting for its status as a ruling class rather than helping the poor. She drew considerable attention in 1980 when she opposed Denmark's support for NATO's decision to modernize Western Europe's missile defences. After gaining increasing popularity, she was elected to the Folketing with a considerable majority in 1979 as representative for Gladsaxe. In 1980, she was appointed Minister of Culture and Minister for Nordic Affairs until the socialist government was defeated in 1982. In 1980, she chaired the UN World Conference on Women in Copenhagen and in 1982 she was deputy chair of the Unesco World Cultural Conference in Mexico. She remained a member of parliament until 1984 but did not seek re-election.

== Later life ==
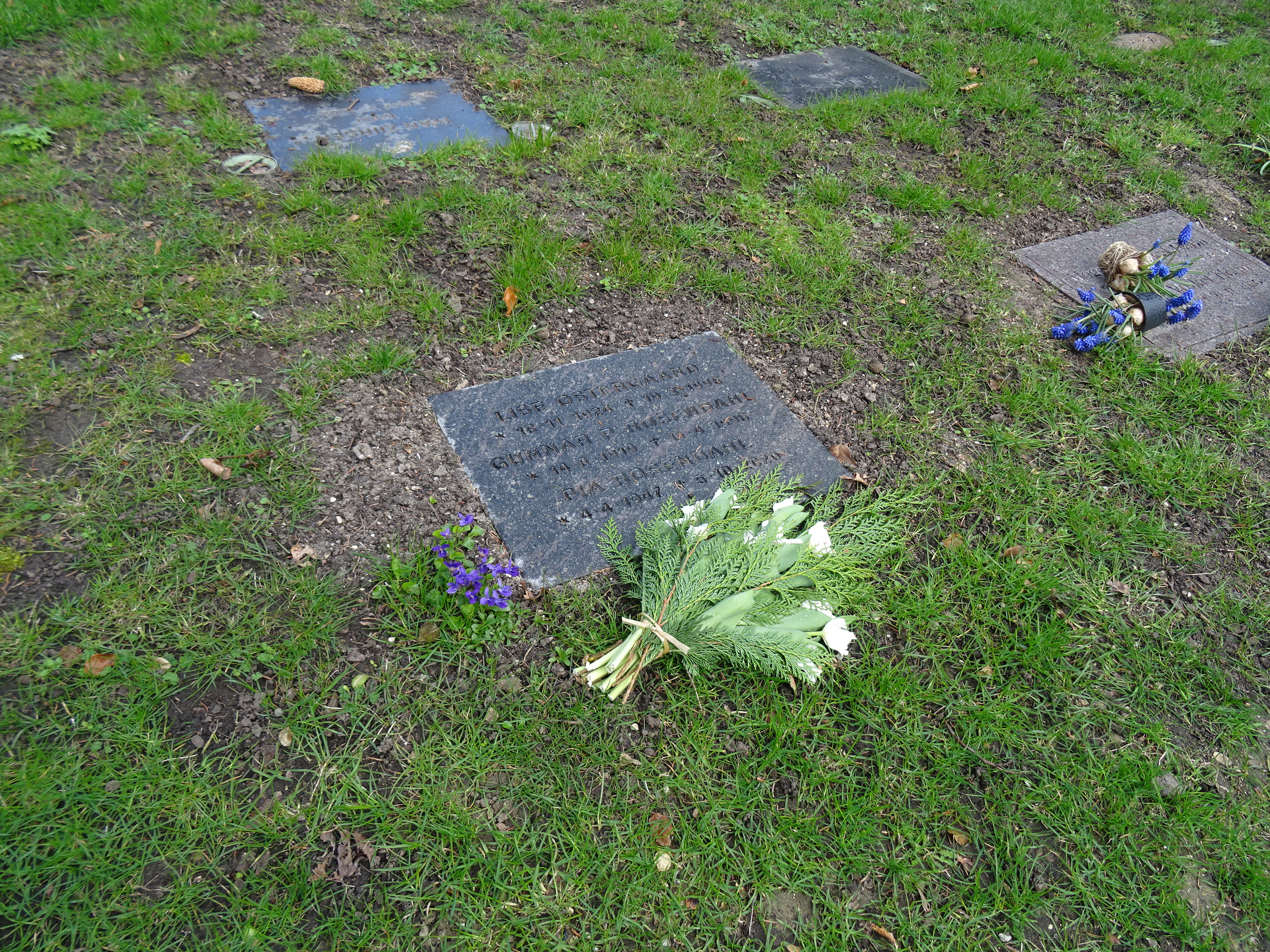
Grave of Østergaard in Holmens Cemetery

On leaving the Folketing, Østergaard returned to the University of Copenhagen, concentrating on the need for women to contribute to international development. She held her post as professor until 1994.

Lise Østergaard died on 19 March 1996 in Copenhagen and is buried in Holmens Cemetery. She shares a grave with Gunnar P. Rosendahl (1919–1996) whom she married in 1974.
