= Kardo Razzazi =

Kardo Razzazi (Kurdish: کاردۆ ڕەزازێ) is a Kurdish-Swedish actor. Born in Uppsala, Sweden, in 1985, he is the son of Kurdish singers Nasser Razazi and Merziye Feriqi.

Razzazi studied acting at the Stockholm Elementära Teaterskola and the Malmö Theatre Academy, graduating in 2011. He subsequently performed at several Swedish theatres, including Malmö City Theatre and Folkteatern in Gothenburg. In 2017, Razzazi wrote and performed the autobiographical monologue Allt som blev kvar, which explored his family background and relationship with his father. The production received attention in Swedish media.

== Films and TV ==
His major TV and film appearances include the following. Regarding films, he has appeared in Backstabbing for Beginners (2018), 'Suedi' (2021), Rheingold (2022), and The Abyss (2023). He also appeared in the television series Heder, Huss, Peacemaker and The Åre Murders.
