= Stora Barnhuset =

Coordinates: 59.3367°N 18.0578°E

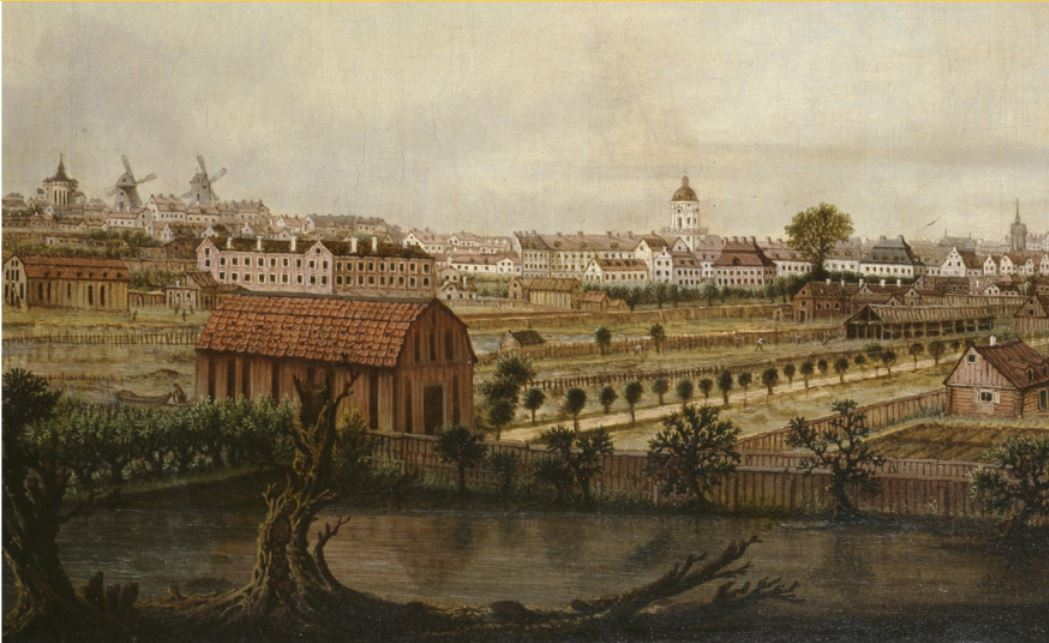
Stora barnhuset in 1784; the orphanage is the big white building behind the shed in the front.

Stora Barnhuset (literally: "Great Children's Home"), from 1785 known as Allmänna Barnhuset ("Public Children's Home"), was Sweden's largest orphanage, founded 1633 in Stockholm and active until 1922. The charitable foundation of the orphanage still exists, now supporting research associated with children's care.

== History ==
The predecessor of the Stora Barnhuset was the Barn- och Tukthuset ('Children's Home and Work House'), an institution with a combined orphanage and a prison work house for adults, which was founded in 1624. This institution was poorly managed and in 1631, the orphanage and the adult's prison was split.

=== 1633-1785 ===
The orphanage was re-founded in 1633 and the office of director was given to Johannes Matthiæ, teacher of Queen Christina of Sweden. Initially a private orphanage, it was made a public orphanage in 1637 and secured incomes from the city by a number of taxes and economic privileges. It was also frequently given donations by private benefactors.

On 12 March 1677, a formal reglement was issued by mayor Jean de la Vallée and councillor Heinrich Sparjin, giving the orphanage a set organization. The orphanage was placed under the management of a direction from the city authorities. The responsibility was shared by a woman and a man, Husmodern ('House Mother') and Sysslomannen, who managed the affairs of the orphanage; under them followed the Praeceptorn and the Lärmodern ('Teacher Mother') with responsibility of the admittance and care of the boys and girls respectively, their education and their teachers; under them in rank came the remaining staff of male servants, nurses and maids; a side group consisted of the Sjukmodern ('Nurse Mother'), responsible for the orphanage hospital and its staff, which was under the direction of the city barber and physician. At least before the 19th-century, the women office holders were normally recruited among widows and daughters of clergymen.

The orphanage admitted children five years or older, foundlings, orphans or children whose parents was unable to care for them. Between 1755 and 1785, children younger than five where nursed in a smaller orphanage, Politibarnhuset or Lilla Barnhuset ('Small Children's House'), attached to the Danviken Hospital, until they were old enough to be admitted to Stora Barnhuset. The children admitted were given elementary schooling regardless of gender, and were given some professional training, normally within some craft. At about the age of twelve, after elementary level schooling was completed, boys who had displayed particular talent had the right to be offered further schooling, while the rest of the boys, and all the girls, were given out to apprenticeship to craftsmen or employed as servants.

After the 1750s, the number of children was normally around 300–350. The mortality rate was high and abuse was not unheard off: in 1770, a scandal was revealed when the staff was found to have kept the children in a halfstarved state by selling their food rations.

=== 1785-1922 ===
On 4 May 1785, a new regulation by Gustav III of Sweden stipulated that orphans should be placed in foster homes rather than at an orphanage, and that the task of an orphanage was to find a foster home for children as soon as possible. This was a major reform, and from 1785 onward, the orphanage only housed children until foster homes could be found, and most children stayed only for a couple of months. Nevertheless, the number of children was high. From 1850, all children above the age of six where to be placed in foster home.

About 20,000 children were admitted from 1880 to 1922.

== Position ==
For 250 years located at the corner of Drottninggatan and Barnhusgatan ("Children's House Street"), in the block Barnhuset ("The Children's House"), both named after the orphanage. In 1885 it was moved to Norrtullsgatan.

The orphanage itself was closed in 1922, but the clinic of the orphanage was converted into a children's hospital, known as Norrtulls sjukhus ("Norrtull Hospital").

== See also ==
- Infanticide Act
