= List of awards and nominations received by Alicia Vikander =

Alicia Vikander awards and nominations
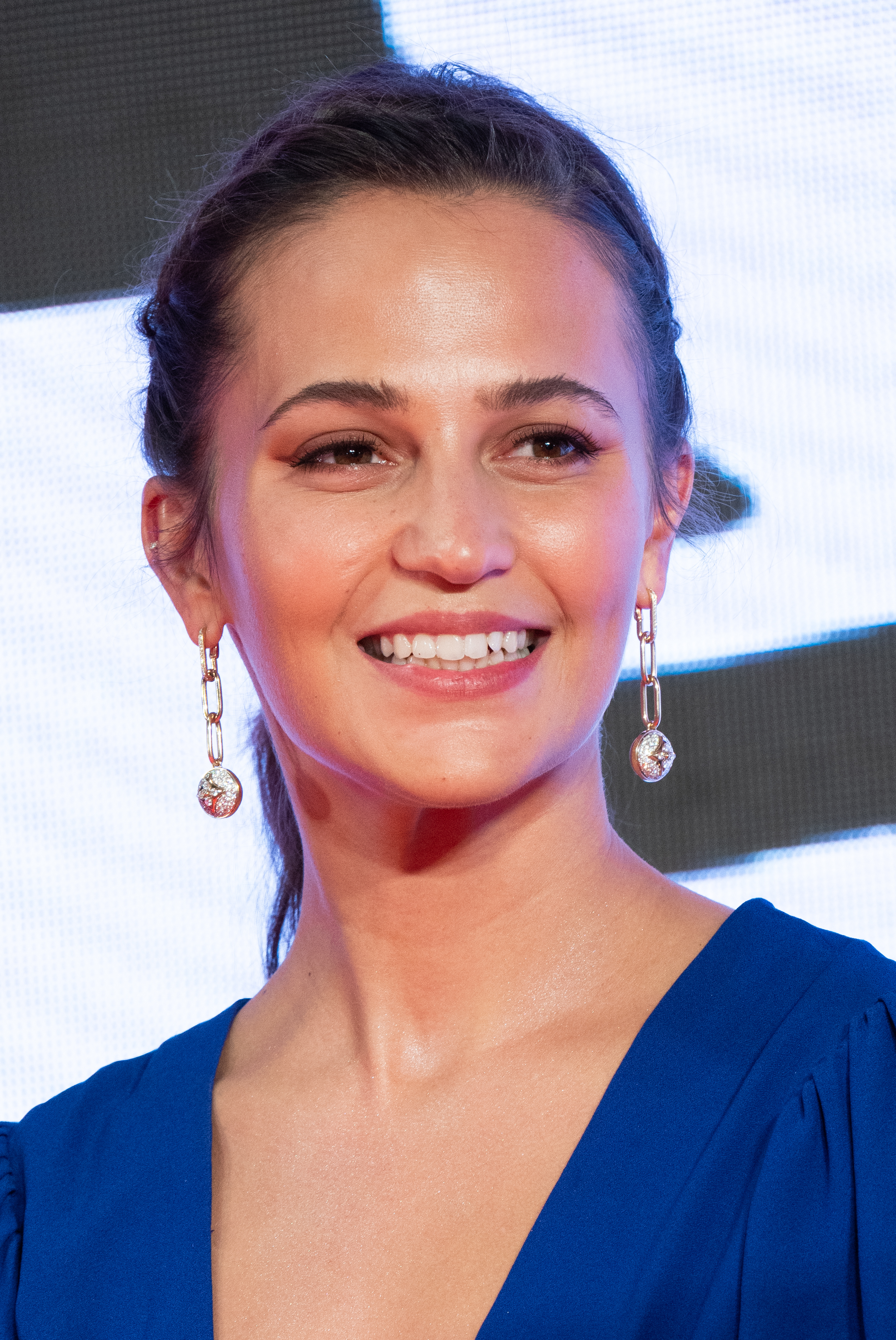
- Vikander in 2019
Awards and nominations
Award	Wins	Nominations
Academy Awards	1	1
British Academy Film Awards	0	3
Critics' Choice Movie Awards	1	1
Golden Globes Awards	0	2
Screen Actors Guild Awards	1	1

Totals (Note: Certain award groups do not simply award one winner. They acknowledge several different recipients, have runners-up, and have third place. Since this is a specific recognition and is different from losing an award, runner-up mentions are considered wins in this award tally. For simplification and to avoid errors, each award in this list has been presumed to have had a prior nomination.)
- Wins: 30
- Nominations: 73

Alicia Vikander is a Swedish actress who has received various accolades throughout her career, including an Academy Award, a Screen Actors Guild Award, a Critics' Choice Movie Award, and a Satellite Award, as well as earning nominations for three British Academy Film Awards, two Golden Globe Awards, and an AACTA Award.

Vikander began her acting career in 2002 and made her feature film debut in the 2010 drama Pure, starring as a high school dropout determined to create a new identity to escape her troubled upbringing. For her performance in the film she received the Guldbagge Award for Best Actress in a Leading Role, and in 2011 she received the Shooting Stars Award from the Berlin International Film Festival. The following year, she played Caroline Matilda of Great Britain in Danish historical drama A Royal Affair with Mads Mikkelsen, for which she was nominated in the Best Actress category at both the Bodil Awards and Robert Award, and she made her English-language debut playing Kitty in the 2012 film adaptation of Tolstoy's Anna Karenina—the role brought her international recognition.

Vikander starred as wartime nurse Vera Brittain in the 2014 drama Testament of Youth, for which she was nominated at the British Independent Film Awards. In 2015 she received awards in the Best Supporting Actress category from the Chicago Film Critics Association, Los Angeles Film Critics Association, Toronto Film Critics Association, and Vancouver Film Critics Circle for her portrayal of an android in psychological thriller Ex Machina. In the same year, she portrayed Danish painter Gerda Wegener, the wife of transgender pioneer Lili Elbe, in The Danish Girl, for which she received the Academy Award for Best Supporting Actress, Screen Actors Guild Award for Outstanding Performance by a Female Actor in a Supporting Role, and the Critics' Choice Movie Award for Best Supporting Actress.

== Awards and nominations ==
Award	Year (Note: Year in which awards ceremony was held)	Film(s)	Category	Result	Ref.
AACTA Awards	2016	The Danish Girl	Best Supporting Actress – International	Nominated	
Academy Awards	2016	The Danish Girl	Best Supporting Actress	Won	
Alliance of Women Film Journalists	2013	A Royal Affair	Best Breakthrough Performance	Nominated	
Alliance of Women Film Journalists	2016	Ex Machina	Best Supporting Actress	Nominated	
Alliance of Women Film Journalists	2016	Ex Machina; Testament of Youth; The Danish Girl	Best Breakthrough Performance	Won	
Austin Film Critics Association	2015	Ex Machina	Best Supporting Actress	Won	
Austin Film Critics Association	2015	Ex Machina	Best Breakthrough Artist	Nominated	
Berlin International Film Festival	2011	—	Shooting Stars	Won	
Bodil Awards	2013	A Royal Affair	Best Actress	Nominated	
Boston Society of Film Critics	2015	Unspecified (Note: Boston Society of Film Critics did not specify which film she was nominated for.)	Best Supporting Actress	Runner-up	
British Academy Film Awards	2013	—	Rising Star	Nominated	
British Academy Film Awards	2016	The Danish Girl	Best Actress	Nominated	
British Academy Film Awards	2016	Ex Machina	Best Supporting Actress	Nominated	
British Independent Film Awards	2014	Testament of Youth	Best Actress	Nominated	
British Independent Film Awards	2015	The Danish Girl	Best Actress	Nominated	
British Independent Film Awards	2024	The Assessment	Best Lead Performance	Nominated	
Chicago Film Critics Association	2015	Ex Machina	Best Supporting Actress	Won	
Critics' Choice Documentary Awards	2019	Anthropocene: The Human Epoch	Best Narration	Nominated	
Critics' Choice Movie Awards	2016	The Danish Girl	Best Supporting Actress	Won	
Critics' Choice Super Awards	2022	The Green Knight	Best Actress in a Science Fiction/Fantasy Movie	Nominated	
Dallas–Fort Worth Film Critics Association	2015	Ex Machina	Best Supporting Actress	2nd	
Dallas–Fort Worth Film Critics Association	2015	The Danish Girl	Best Supporting Actress	4th	
Detroit Film Critics Society	2015	The Danish Girl	Best Supporting Actress	Won	
Detroit Film Critics Society	2015	Ex Machina	Best Supporting Actress	Nominated	
Detroit Film Critics Society	2015	The Danish Girl; Ex Machina	Best Breakthrough	Won	
Dorian Awards	2016	—	Rising Star	Won	
Empire Awards	2013	Anna Karenina	Best Female Newcomer	Nominated	
Empire Awards	2015	Ex Machina	Best Actress	Nominated	
Empire Awards	2016	The Danish Girl	Best Actress	Won	
European Film Awards	2015	Ex Machina	Best Actress	Nominated	
Florida Film Critics Circle	2015	Ex Machina	Best Supporting Actress	Nominated	
Florida Film Critics Circle	2015	Ex Machina; The Danish Girl	Pauline Kael Breakout Award	Runner-up	
Golden Globe Awards	2016	The Danish Girl	Best Actress – Drama	Nominated	
Golden Globe Awards	2016	Ex Machina	Best Supporting Actress	Nominated	
Guldbagge Awards	2010	Pure	Best Actress	Won	
Hamptons International Film Festival	2012	—	Variety's Ten Actors to Watch	Won	
Hollywood Film Awards	2015	The Danish Girl	Breakout Actress	Won	
Houston Film Critics Society	2016	The Danish Girl	Best Supporting Actress	Nominated	
Houston Film Critics Society	2016	Ex Machina	Best Supporting Actress	Nominated	
International Filmfestival Mannheim-Heidelberg	2010	Pure	Special Mention	Won	
Ischia Global Film & Music Festival	2015	—	Breakout Actress of the Year	Won	
Jupiter Award	2017	The Danish Girl	Best International Actress	Nominated	
London Film Critics' Circle	2016	Ex Machina	Supporting Actress of the Year	Nominated	
Los Angeles Film Critics Association	2015	Ex Machina	Best Supporting Actress	Won	
Marrakech International Film Festival	2013	Hotell	Best Actress	Won	
Molodist	2011	Pure	Best Young Actress	Won	
MTV Movie Awards	2016	Ex Machina	Best Female Performance	Nominated	
National Society of Film Critics	2016	Ex Machina	Best Supporting Actress	2nd	
New York Film Critics Online	2015	Ex Machina; The Danish Girl	Best Breakthrough Performance	Won	
Online Film Critics Society	2015	The Danish Girl	Best Supporting Actress	Nominated	
Palm Springs International Film Festival	2016	The Danish Girl	Rising Star	Won	
Robert Award	2013	A Royal Affair	Best Actress	Nominated	
San Diego Film Critics Society	2015	Ex Machina	Best Actress	Nominated	
San Diego Film Critics Society	2015	The Danish Girl	Best Supporting Actress	Nominated	
San Diego Film Critics Society	2015	The Danish Girl; Ex Machina; The Man from U.N.C.L.E. Burnt	Best Body of Work	Won	
San Diego Film Critics Society	2015	The Danish Girl; Ex Machina	Breakthrough Artist	Runner-up	
San Francisco Film Critics Circle	2015	The Danish Girl	Best Supporting Actress	Nominated	
San Francisco Film Critics Circle	2015	Ex Machina	Best Supporting Actress	Nominated	
Santa Barbara International Film Festival	2016	—	Virtuoso Award	Won	
Satellite Awards	2016	The Danish Girl	Best Supporting Actress	Won	
Saturn Awards	2016	Ex Machina	Best Supporting Actress	Nominated	
Screen Actors Guild Awards	2016	The Danish Girl	Outstanding Performance by a Female Actor in a Supporting Role	Won	
St. Louis Film Critics Association	2015	The Danish Girl	Best Actress	Nominated	
St. Louis Film Critics Association	2015	Ex Machina	Best Supporting Actress	Won	
Stockholm International Film Festival	2010	—	Rising Star	Won	
Teen Choice Awards	2016	The Danish Girl	Choice Actress: Drama	Nominated	
Teen Choice Awards	2016	Jason Bourne	Choice AnTEENcipated Movie Actress	Nominated	
Teen Choice Awards	2018	Tomb Raider	Choice Action Movie Actress	Nominated	
Toronto Film Critics Association	2015	Ex Machina	Best Supporting Actress	Won	
Vancouver Film Critics Circle	2015	Ex Machina	Best Supporting Actress	Won	
Vancouver Film Critics Circle	2015	The Danish Girl	Best Supporting Actress	Nominated	
Washington D.C. Area Film Critics Association	2015	Ex Machina	Best Supporting Actress	Won	
Washington D.C. Area Film Critics Association	2015	The Danish Girl	Best Supporting Actress	Nominated	
Women Film Critics Circle	2015	The Danish Girl	The Invisible Woman Award	Won	
