= Merziye Feriqi =

Kurdish singer

- مه‌رزیه فه‌ریقی Merziye Ferîqî
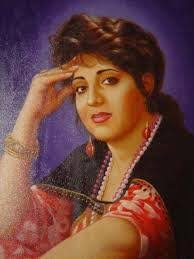
- Born: 18 May 1958; Marivan, Iran
- Died: 18 December 2005 (aged 47); Stockholm, Sweden
- Political party: Komala
- Spouse: (married 1978–2005) Nasser Razazi
- Children: Dilnya Razazi, Kardo Razazi

Merziye Feriqi (or Marziya Fariqi; Kurdish: مه‌رزیه فه‌ریقی, Merziye Ferîqî; Persian: مرضیه فریقی) (1958 – 18 September 2005) was a Kurdish singer. She was born in Mariwan in west of Iran. Her family were originally from Sanandaj. From a very early age, she was interested in music and singing, and was taking part in the local school music bands. She used to listen to the Kurdish music programs broadcast from Radio Baghdad, and in this way she got to know famous Kurdish singers such as Meryem Xan, Nesrîn Şêrwan, Eyşe Şan and Gulbihar. She finished her elementary and high school in Mariwan, and then began working as a teacher in the villages of that region. In 1977, she started working with the music band of Sine. She married the famous Kurdish singer Nasir Razazi in 1978. In the same year, she was arrested for her involvements in the Iranian Revolution by the Pahlavi regime. Around the same period, she and her colleagues (Nasir Razai and Najamaddin Gholami) formed a Kurdish music band and began working together. In 1980, she joined the peshmerga forces of Komala, and formed another music band named Korî Bangewaz. She recorded several songs in this period, among them Silaw bo Pêşmerge (Hello Peshmerga), Giyanekem bo asmanî şîn (My life for the Blue sky), Maçî Xudayî (Divine Kiss) and Payîz (Autumn). She is often known as "Um Kulthum of Kurds", or she is considered the greatest singer in Kurdish history.

== Sweden and exile ==
In 1984, she and her husband Nasser Razazi left Iran and sought refuge in Sweden, thinking to gain a. better life there for their daughter Dilnya. Their son Kardo Razzazi was born in Uppsala.

She produced her first work in exile in 1994. Her songs were also broadcast on the Kurdish satellite television Med TV. She also got involved with women and children's rights movements and became a member of the Association for Children's Rights in Sweden. In the Kurdish satellite network of Medya TV, she presented a program on women's rights called Jîlemo. On different cultural occasions, she presented her work alongside other Kurdish female singers such as Gulistan Perwer and Beser Şahîn. She died on September 18, 2005 at the age of 47 after a surgery in Sweden.
