= Vaka (TV series) =

2026 Swedish drama series

- Directed by: Henrik Georgsson
- Starring: Jonas Karlsson; Aliette Opheim; Gizem Erdogan
- Country of origin: Sweden
- Original language: Swedish

Original release
- Network: Prime video
- Release: 30 January 2026

Vaka is a six-episode 2026 Swedish drama series focused on the fallout of an insomnia epidemic in Stockholm. It premiered 30 January 2026 on Prime Video. On the Swedish review aggregator website Kritiker, the film earned an average rating of 2.5/5 based on 11 critics' reviews.

== Cast ==
- Jonas Karlsson as Christian Elwing, the Minister for Health and Social Affairs and a former physician; Hugo's father and a widower since the death of his wife Linnea
- Aliette Opheim as Elin Karlberg: an ambulance nurse and Moa's wife
- Gizem Erdogan as Saga: a government official
- Silas Strand as Isak: Johannes' young son
- Malte Gårdinger as Hugo Elwing: Christian's son with substance abuse issues and a long criminal history
- Frida Argento as Linda: a teenage social media influencer
- Jörgen Thorsson as Johannes Johansson: Isak's father
- Siham Shurafa as Moa: Elin's wife and a colleague of Christian's

== Episodes ==
No.	Title	Directed by	Written by	Original release date
1	"Wide Awake"	Henrik Georgsson	Brynja Björk	30 January 2026
A plane crashes in the opening flashforward. Eighteen hours earlier, a disoriented ski lift attendant, Lukas, causes a mass casualty incident. Ambulance nurse Elin responds to the scene and receives CPR help from Lovisa, a non-practicing physician. Elin wants to admit Lukas to the hospital, but police suspect drugs; he later escapes custody. Distracted by securing a lighter sentence for his troubled son, Hugo, the Minister for Health Christian announces a partnership with Framkemi. His medical school friend Henrika owns the company and is publicly confronted by an agitated employee demanding they contact the ECDC; he is escorted away by security. Teen influencer Linda films a woman falling off a treadmill who says she "wants to be tired." Elin receives a panicked call from Lukas, interrupting an anniversary dinner with her wife, Moa; Elin finds him dead. As Christian and his colleague Saga meet to have sex, Henrika reviews results warning of a catastrophe. The pilot collapses, causing the crash that kills 190 people, including Henrika. Online, Linda suggests the name "Vaka" for the disease that prevents sleep.
2	"Behind Closed Doors"	Henrik Georgsson	Brynja Björk	30 January 2026
3	"Thicker Than Water"	Henrik Georgsson	Pauline Wolff	30 January 2026
4	"Break the Fall"	Henrik Georgsson	Pauline Wolff	30 January 2026
5	"The Greater Good"	Henrik Georgsson	Brynja Björk	30 January 2026
6	"Cut and Run"	Henrik Georgsson	Brynja Björk	30 January 2026
