= Diary of a Ditched Girl =

Swedish television series

- Swedish: Halva Malmö består av killar som dumpat mig
- Genre: Comedy drama
- Based on: Halva Malmö by Amanda Romare
- Written by: Tove Eriksen Hillblom; Moa Herngren
- Directed by: Emma Bucht; Susanne Thorson
- Starring: Carla Sehn
- Country of origin: Sweden
- Original language: Swedish
- No. of series: 1
- No. of episodes: 7

Production
- Executive producers: Emma Hägglund; Johannes Jensen
- Producer: Emma Nyberg
- Production company: Jarowskij

Original release
- Network: Netflix

Diary of a Ditched Girl (Swedish: Halva Malmö består av killar som dumpat mig, lit. 'Half of Malmö consists of guys who dumped me') is a 2025 Swedish comedy drama television series about the perils of modern dating, starring Carla Sehn. It was released on Netflix on 11 September 2025.

== Premise ==
The series follows Amanda, a 30 year-old Swedish woman, as she determinedly goes on a series of dates following an incident in a park that spurs her into action.

== Cast ==
- Carla Sehn as Amanda
- Moah Madsen as Adina
- Ingela Olsson as Monika
- Dilan Apak as Jabba
- Malou Marnfeldt as Lilleman
- Zahraa Aldoujaili as Ronja
- Johannes Lindkvist as Emil Wester
- Kit Walker Johansson as Grannen, Amanda's neighbor
- Isac Calmroth as Filip, Adina's boyfriend
- Victor Ivan as The Consultant
- Adam Dahlstrom as The Bartender
- Torkel Petersson as Rikard
- Mads Korsgaard as The Faceless

== Production ==
The series is an adaptation by Tove Eriksen Hillblom and Moa Herngren of Amanda Romare's novel Halva Malmö, and directed by Emma Bucht and Susanne Thorson with production from Jarowskij. It was announced by Netflix as part of its Nordic slate in March 2024.

The seven-part series is starring Carla Sehn as Amanda with Moah Madsen as her sister Adina, with the cast also featuring Ingela Olsson, Dilan Apak, Malou Marnfeldt, Zahraa Aldoujaili, and Torkel Petersson as well as Johannes Lindkvist, Kit Walker Johannson, Isac Calmroth, Victor Ivan and Adam Dahlstrom.

== Release ==
The series was released on Netflix on 11 September 2025.
