= Björn Mosten =

Swedish actor (born 1997)

Björn Olof Hampus Mosten (born 14 July 1997) is a Swedish actor. He rose to prominence with his acting debut as Max Järvi, an IT technician who becomes involved in a provocative relationship with consultant Sofie Rydman, in the Netflix romantic comedy-drama series Love & Anarchy (2020–2022). The role brought him wider recognition in Sweden and internationally and marked his transition from university student to professional actor.

After Love & Anarchy, Mosten expanded his career into theatre and further television work. In 2022, he made his stage debut in an adaptation of The Hunt in Stockholm, and he later appeared in the television series Evil (2023) and Rebound (2025).

== Early life and education ==
Mosten is from Dvärsätt, Sweden. He studied civil engineering at Uppsala University before pursuing a career in acting.

Mosten grew up in Jämtland and later moved to Uppsala for university studies. He initially studied psychology before switching to a civil engineering programme in information technology at Uppsala University, while simultaneously auditioning for acting roles. Before being cast in Love & Anarchy, he had no professional screen-acting credits, making the series his breakthrough role.

== Career ==
Mosten made his acting debut in 2020 with a leading role in Love & Anarchy, where he portrayed Max Järvi. In 2022, he made his stage debut in a theatre adaptation of The Hunt at The House of Culture in Stockholm.

He later appeared in the television series Evil (2023). He also appeared in Rebound, which was renewed for a second season with an additional 10 episodes.

== Filmography ==
=== Television ===
- Love & Anarchy (2020–2022) – Max Järvi
- Evil (2023)
- Rebound (2025)
