= The Åre Murders =

Swedish television series

- Genre: Nordic noir
- Based on: Hidden in Snow and Hidden in the Shadows by Viveca Sten
- Screenplay by: Karin Gidfors; Jimmy Lindgren
- Directed by: Joakim Eliasson; Alain Darborg
- Starring: Carla Sehn; Kardo Razzazi
- Original language: Swedish
- No. of series: 1
- No. of episodes: 5

Production
- Executive producers: Tim King; Susann Billberg-Rydholm; Viveca Sten
- Producer: Brita H Lunqvist
- Production company: SF Studios

Original release
- Network: Netflix
- Release: 5 February 2025

The Åre Murders (Swedish: Åremorden) is a 2025 Swedish Nordic noir television series starring Carla Sehn that premiered on Netflix on 5 February 2025. It is based on the Viveca Sten murder mystery novels Hidden in Snow and Hidden in the Shadows.

== Premise ==
A detective, Hanna, leaves Stockholm for the remote city of Åre, and discovers a missing girl case.

== Cast ==
- Carla Sehn – Hanna Ahlander
- Kardo Razzazi – Daniel Lindskog
- Charlie Gustavsson – Anton Lundin
- Francisco Sobrado – Raffe Herreda
- Maxida Märak – Ylva Labba
- Pia Johansson – Birgitta Grip
- Cora Watson – Lydia
- Cecilia von der Esch – Ida Lindskog
- Linton Calmroth – Viktor Malm
- Moa Gammel – Annika Risberg
- Siham Shurafa – Mira Berg
- Olle Sarri – Fredrik Berg
- Freddie Mosten-Jacob – Amanda Halvorsén
- Sofia Ledarp – Lena Halvorsén
- Henrik Norlén – Harald Halvorsén
- Frida Argento – Ebba Niemi
- Robin Stegmar – Bosse Lundh
- Fredrik Söderholm – Lasse Sandahl
- Moa Stefansdotter – Karolina
- Alva Kristiansson – Mimmi
- Kid Angland – Kalle
- Algot Tangen – Alice
- Diana Gardner – Zuhra
- Amalia Holm – Rebecka Nordhammar
- Björn Elgerd – Ole Nordhammar
- Viktor Åkerblom – Johan Andersson
- Agnes Kittelsen – Marion Andersson
- Baxter Renman – Leo Andersson
- Jon Øigarden – Jens Wernolf
- Samuel Astor – Carl Willner
- Philip Oros – Linus Sundin

== Production ==
The series is adapted from the Viveca Sten novels Hidden in Snow and Hidden in the Shadows. The series is directed by Joakim Eliasson and Alain Darborg, from an adapted script by Karin Gidfors and Jimmy Lindgren. It is produced by Brita H Lundqvist for SF Studios, with Tim King, Susann Billberg-Rydholm and Viveca Sten as executive producers.

The cast is led by Carla Sehn and Kardo Razzazi as Swedish detectives. Also featuring in the cast are Charlie Gustafsson, Francisco Sobrado and Amalia Holm.

The series was filmed on location in Åre, Jämtland County, Sweden.

== Release ==
The series was released globally on Netflix on 6 February 2025.

== Reception ==
=== Critical response ===
On the review aggregator website Rotten Tomatoes, 86% of 7 critics' reviews are positive, with an average rating of 6.5/10.

Writing for Forbes, Paul Tassi called it "best new crime show", stating: "As for The Åre Murders, you can either trust me that it’s quite good, or you’ll just have to give it a go and try it for yourself. As a big fan of foreign murder stories, I’m the target audience." Johnny Loftus of Decider also gave a positive review, noting: "The Åre Murders features all the hallmarks of the Nordic Noir genre as it turns two differently-wired cops loose on the mystery of a teen’s disappearance. Throw in some fantastic location shots of Sweden’s mountainous north, and we’re all the way in on this investigation."
