= Frida Argento =

Swedish actress (born 2000)

- Born: January 30, 2000 (age 26); Stockholm, Sweden
- Occupation: Actress
- Years active: 2012–present

Frida Argento (born 2000), also known as Frida Argento Abrahamsson, is a Swedish actress. She best known for her breakout role playing Sara Eriksson on the Netflix teen drama Young Royals (2021–2024).

== Career ==
Argento debuted in the short film Astrid as the titular role in 2012. The short was broadcast at the New York International Children's Film Festival. She studied at the art academy Kulturama during 2016–2019, earning a theatre degree. After graduating in 2019, she debuted on stage with the role of Iphigenia in Iphigenia in Aulis at the encouragement of one of her teachers. Her performance was praised by Ylva Lagercrantz Spindler in a review for Svenska Dagbladet.

In 2021, she made her international debut as Sara in Young Royals, to which she earned praise for. She also appeared on the cover of Vogue Scandinavia with the rest of the cast in promotion for the show's final season and behind the scenes documentary: Young Royals Forever. Her portrayal of Sara has been praised as healthy representation on television among female characters on the autism spectrum.

In 2023, she was cast as Sandi in Fejk. In 2024, she starred in the thriller TV movie Zielfahder: Polarjgad as Marie Holm. In 2025, she starred as Ebba in the Nordic noir television series The Åre Murders. In 2026, Argento starred as Linda in the Amazon Prime Video Swedish drama television series Vaka.

== Filmography ==
=== Television ===
Year	Title	Role	Notes	Ref.
2021–2024	Young Royals	Sara Eriksson	Main role	
2022	Riding in Darkness	Bettina		
2023	Fejk	Sandi		
2025	The Åre Murders	Ebba	Main role	
2026	Vaka	Linda	Main role	

=== Films ===
Year	Title	Role	Notes	Ref.
2012	Astrid	Astrid	Short film	
2024	Zielfahder: Polarjgad	Marie Holm	TV movie	
2024	Young Royals Forever	Herself	Documentary	

=== Stage ===
Year	Title	Role	Notes	Ref.
2020	Iphigenia in Aulis	Iphigenia		

== Personal life ==
In 2020, Argento lived in Barcelona and worked in customer service at a motor inspection company. She has stated she has anxiety and has suffered from a panic disorder. In a Netflix: Nordic interview, Argento said she has Asperger syndrome. She speaks, Swedish, Spanish, and English.
