= Alicia Vikander =

Swedish actress (born 1988)

- Vikander at the 2026 Venice Film Festival
- Born: Alicia Amanda Vikander; 3 October 1988 (age 38); Gothenburg, Sweden
- Citizenship: Sweden; UK (since 2020)
- Occupation: Actress
- Years active: 1997–present
- Spouse: Michael Fassbender (m. 2017)
- Children: 2
- Awards: Full list

Alicia Amanda Vikander (/vɪˈkændər/; Swedish: [aˈlǐːsɪa vɪˈkǎnːdɛr]; born 3 October 1988) is a Swedish actress. Her accolades include an Academy Award and an Actor Award, in addition to nominations for three BAFTAs and two Golden Globe Awards.

Born and raised in Gothenburg, Vikander began acting as a child in minor stage productions at the Gothenburg opera house and trained as a ballet dancer at the Royal Swedish Ballet in Stockholm. She began her acting career in Swedish short films and television series and first gained recognition for her role in the drama series Andra Avenyn (2008–2010). She made her feature film debut in Pure (2010), for which she won the Guldbagge Award for Best Actress. She gained wider recognition in 2012 for playing Kitty in Joe Wright's period drama Anna Karenina and Queen Caroline Mathilde in the Danish film A Royal Affair.

Vikander achieved global recognition for her roles as Vera Brittain in Testament of Youth (2014), as Ava, a humanoid robot in Ex Machina (2014), for which she was nominated for the BAFTA Award for Best Actress in a Supporting Role, and as Gerda Wegener in The Danish Girl (2015), for which she won the Academy Award for Best Supporting Actress. In 2016, Vikander was listed by Forbes in its 30 Under 30 list. She has since starred in the action film Jason Bourne (2016), the adventure film Tomb Raider (2018), the fantasy film The Green Knight (2021), and the miniseries Irma Vep (2022).

She married German-Irish actor Michael Fassbender in 2017.

== Early life ==
Vikander was born on 3 October 1988 in Gothenburg to Maria Fahl (1951–2022), a stage actress, and Svante Vikander, a psychiatrist. Her parents are from small villages in the north and south of Sweden, respectively. She is one-quarter Finnish; her maternal great-aunt moved from Finland to Sweden to escape World War II. Alicia's parents separated when she was two months old, and she was mostly raised by her mother. She has five half-siblings on her father's side. Vikander has said she had the best of both worlds growing up, being an only child to her mother and being surrounded by a large family when she went to her father's house every second week.

Vikander started her acting career at seven years old, on stage and on television. She trained in ballet from age nine with the Svenska Balettskolan i Göteborg (1998–2004). At 15, Vikander moved from Gothenburg to train at the ballet's upper school in Stockholm, living on her own. She trained one summer at the American Academy of Ballet in New York.

At age 16, she almost left school to commit fully to the television series she worked on with director Tomas Alfredson, realising her passion for acting. Her dance career was sidelined in her late teens due to injuries. She auditioned for drama school but was turned down twice. At one point, Vikander was admitted to law school but she never attended, following her dreams to become an actress instead.

== Career ==
=== 1997–2014: Rise to prominence ===
Vikander started her acting career at age seven, starring in a production of Kristina från Duvemåla at The Göteborg Opera, which was written by Björn Ulvaeus and Benny Andersson from ABBA, performing in the play for three and a half years. She appeared in several musicals at the Opera, such as The Sound of Music and Les Misérables. In 1997 she participated in the TV4 children's singing show Småstjärnorna; she performed the Helen Sjöholms song, "Du måste finnas". She won her episode with praise from the judges for her stage presence.

She began appearing in a number of short films and television roles in her native Sweden. She later appeared in Swedish TV drama Andra Avenyn from 2008 to 2010.

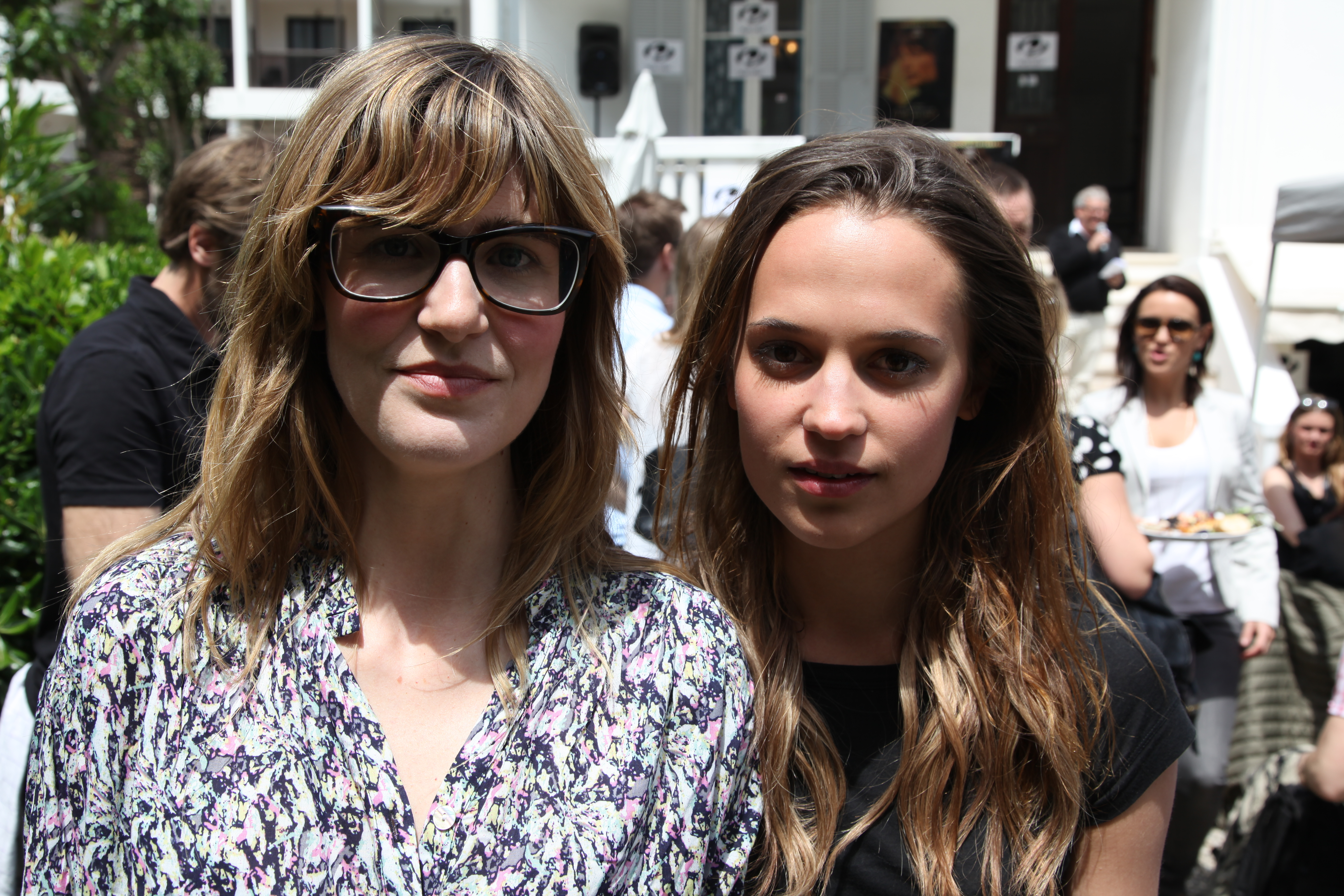
Vikander (right) and director Lisa Langseth at the 2012 Cannes Film Festival

Vikander received critical acclaim for her feature film debut, playing the leading role of Katarina in the Swedish film Pure (2010). The film tells the story of the troubled secretary Katarina, who desperately tries to escape her life. With this role, Vikander won the Rising Star Award in 2010 at the Stockholm International Film Festival, the Shooting Star Award at the Berlin International Film Festival She became represented by Tavistock Wood management in the UK, and shortly afterwards she also signed with United Talent Agency in the US. In 2011, she had the leading role of Fragancia Fernandez, who is arrested for attempted murder, in The Crown Jewels. In 2012, Vikander gained international attention for playing the key role of Kitty in the English-language film adaptation of Anna Karenina, starring Keira Knightley. The film premiered at the 2012 Toronto International Film Festival and received positive reviews.

That year, she added Danish to her repertoire while co-starring as Queen Caroline Mathilde in the Nikolaj Arcel feature film A Royal Affair. It had its world premiere at the 62nd Berlin International Film Festival and was received with critical acclaim. The film was subsequently nominated for the Academy Award for Best Foreign Language Film at the 85th Academy Awards. Vikander was named as one of the 10 Actors to Watch: Breakthrough Performances of 2012 at the 20th Hamptons International Film Festival, was nominated for BAFTA Rising Star Award in 2013, and received the Editor's Choice Award at the 2013 Elle Style Awards.

In 2013, she starred as German Pirate Party member Anke Domscheit-Berg in The Fifth Estate. The film opened the Toronto International Film Festival on 5 September 2013. It garnered mixed critical reactions. Vikander also had the leading role of Erika in the Swedish film Hotell, for which she got the Marrakech International Film Festival Award for Best Actress. In 2014, she appeared in the Australian crime thriller Son of a Gun. The film was released in Australia on 16 October 2014 and received mixed reviews; Vikander was praised for her performance.

=== 2015–2019: Breakthrough and acclaim ===
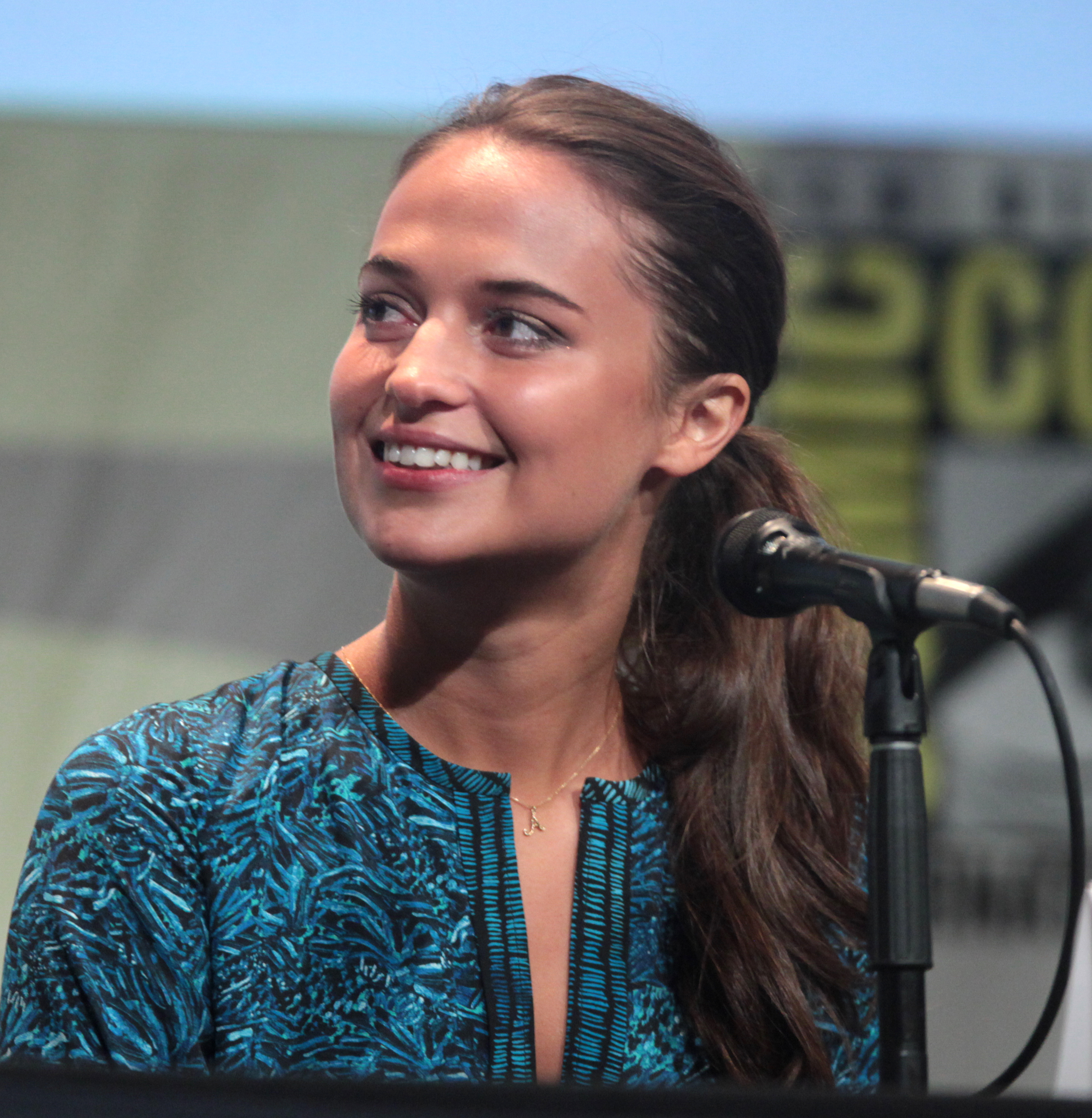
Vikander at the 2015 San Diego Comic-Con

In 2015, Vikander had substantial roles in eight films. She garnered widespread critical acclaim for her portrayal of painter Gerda Wegener in Tom Hooper's The Danish Girl, for which she won the Academy Award for Best Supporting Actress, becoming the second Swedish actress to win this award; the Actor Award for Outstanding Performance by a Female Actor in a Supporting Role, and the Critics' Choice Movie Award for Best Supporting Actress; and received a nomination for the Golden Globe Award for Best Actress in a Motion Picture – Drama and the BAFTA Award for Best Actress in a Leading Role but lost both awards to Brie Larson for Room.

She garnered critical acclaim and wide recognition for her starring role as Artificial intelligence Ava in Alex Garland's directorial debut Ex Machina, for which she received a nomination for the Golden Globe Award for Best Supporting Actress – Motion Picture and the BAFTA Award for Best Actress in a Supporting Role. In 2016, Forbes included Vikander in its 30 Under 30 list.

She had the leading role of pacifist Vera Brittain in Testament of Youth alongside Kit Harington and Emily Watson. Testament of Youth was well received upon its release, with critics particularly praising Vikander's performance. For her role as Brittain, Vikander was nominated for BIFA for Best Performance by an Actress in a British Independent Film. She also played the role of half-human/half-witch Alice Deane in the fantasy film Seventh Son (2015), narrated the Swedish documentary Ingrid Bergman: In Her Own Words (2015), had the female leading role in the Guy Ritchie-directed action film The Man from U.N.C.L.E., based on the 1964 MGM television series of the same name; and appeared in the film Burnt (2015).

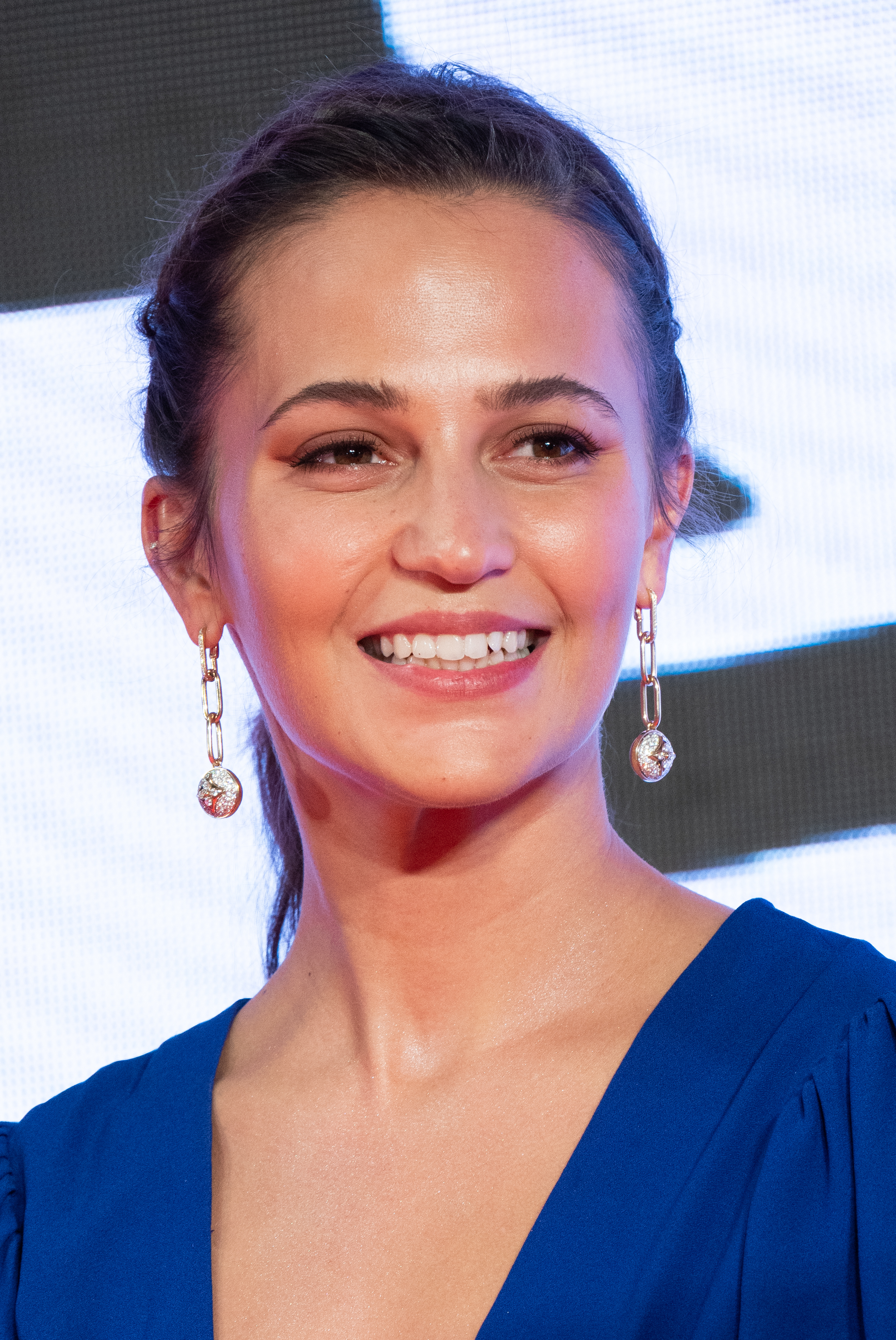
Vikander at the Tokyo International Film Festival in 2019.

On 6 May 2016, it was announced that Vikander set up a production company called Vikarious along with her agent Charles Collier. The company's first film, Euphoria, a production with Sweden's B-Reel Films, began shooting in the German Alps in August 2016. The film is the English-language directorial debut of Swedish writer/director Lisa Langseth, and was Langseth and Vikander's third collaboration. Vikander starred opposite Eva Green and Charlotte Rampling as sisters in conflict travelling through Europe toward a mystery destination. Euphoria received its premiere at the Toronto International Film Festival (TIFF) in September 2017.

In 2016, Vikander starred opposite Matt Damon in Jason Bourne, directed by Paul Greengrass. It was released on 29 July 2016 by Universal Pictures. Vikander then appeared in the adaptation of the novel The Light Between Oceans (2016), directed by Derek Cianfrance, with Michael Fassbender and Rachel Weisz. The film was released in the United States by Touchstone Pictures on 2 September 2016. Vikander portrayed Lara Croft in the action reboot film Tomb Raider, which was released on 16 March 2018. In 2019, Vikander starred in the short film I Am Easy to Find directed by Mike Mills, which was part of the eighth album of the same name by The National. That same year, Vikander starred in the psychological thriller Earthquake Bird opposite Riley Keough directed by Wash Westmoreland for Netflix.

=== 2020–present ===
In 2020, Vikander portrayed a young Gloria Steinem in the biographic drama The Glorias directed by Julie Taymor, which had its world premiere at the Sundance Film Festival in January 2020. Vikander next starred opposite Dev Patel in the medieval fantasy The Green Knight (2021) directed by David Lowery which was released by A24. She also starred in the thriller Beckett (2021), opposite John David Washington directed by Ferdinando Cito Filomarino and produced by Luca Guadagnino, and Blue Bayou directed by Justin Chon. She starred in Firebrand (2023) as Queen Catherine Parr, replacing Michelle Williams. She starred together with Cate Blanchett in Guy Maddin's film Rumours (2024). Vikander then starred in the upcoming The Wizard of the Kremlin alongside Paul Dano and Jude Law.

== Advocacy ==
Vikander identifies as a feminist and has advocated gender equality in film, commenting:

I'd just made five films in a row, and [Tulip Fever] was the first one where I had a scene with another woman. ... There's a change happening, and I want to be part of that, [because] you see something like The Hunger Games or Insurgent proving that a female role can carry a successful blockbuster, and that means something.

On 10 November 2017, Vikander was one of 584 women who called for the Swedish film and theatre industries to address what they claimed was a culture of sexual misconduct. She added her signature to an open letter published in the Swedish newspaper Svenska Dagbladet. The letter contained numerous accounts of sexual harassment, assault and rape suffered by women in the Swedish industry, all recounted anonymously. According to a translation of the letter published by English-language Swedish publication The Local, the signatories vowed that they would "no longer be silent". Following the letter's publication, Swedish press reported that culture minister Alice Bah Kuhnke called a meeting of the heads of Sweden's National Theatre Company, the Royal Dramatic Theatre, and the Royal Swedish Opera.

== Personal life ==
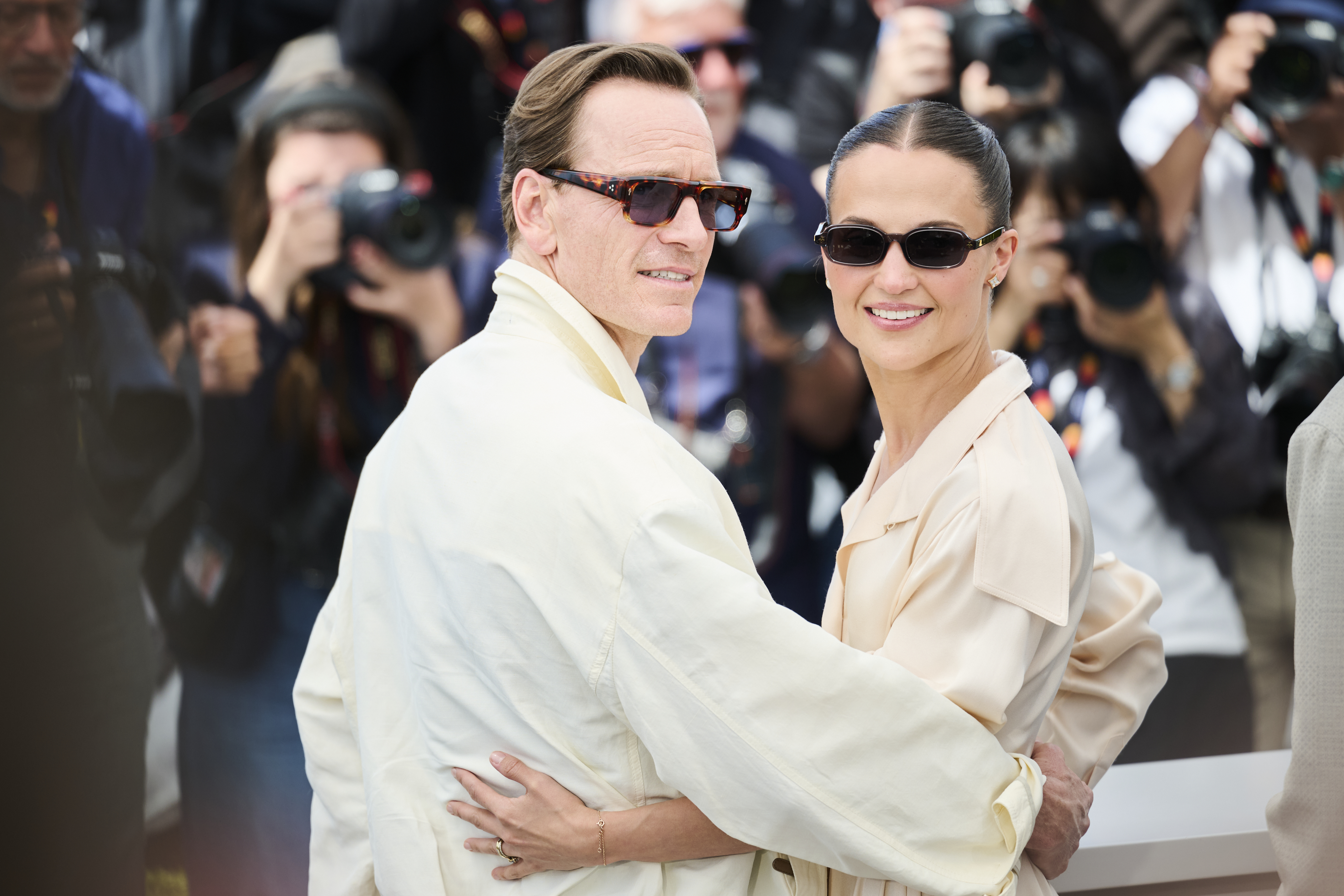
Michael Fassbender and Vikander at the 2026 Cannes Film Festival

In late 2014, Vikander began a relationship with actor Michael Fassbender, whom she met while filming The Light Between Oceans. They made their first public appearance as a couple at the 2016 Golden Globe Awards, where Vikander was nominated for her performances in Ex Machina and The Danish Girl, and Fassbender was nominated for Steve Jobs. They married on 14 October 2017 in a private ceremony in Ibiza, Spain. They have two sons, born in 2021 and 2024.

Vikander lived in London for several years before moving to Lisbon, Portugal, with her husband in 2017. In 2020, she acquired British citizenship, becoming a dual citizen of Sweden and the United Kingdom.

== Filmography ==
=== Film ===
Year	Title	Role	Notes	Ref.
2010	Pure	Katarina		
2011	The Crown Jewels	Fragancia Fernandez		
2012	A Royal Affair	Caroline Matilda of Great Britain		
2012	Anna Karenina	Ekaterina "Kitty" Alexandrovna		
2013	The Fifth Estate	Anke Domscheit-Berg		
2013	Hotell	Erika		
2014	Testament of Youth	Vera Brittain		
2014	Son of a Gun	Tasha		
2014	Ex Machina	Ava		
2014	Seventh Son	Alice Deane		
2015	Ingrid Bergman: In Her Own Words	Ingrid Bergman (voice)	Documentary film	
2015	The Man from U.N.C.L.E.	Gaby Teller		
2015	The Danish Girl	Gerda Wegener	Academy Award for Best Supporting Actress	
2015	Burnt	Anne Marie		
2015	The Magic Diner	Herself	Short film	
2016	Jason Bourne	Heather Lee		
2016	The Light Between Oceans	Isabel Graysmark Sherbourne		
2017	Birds Like Us	Huppu, Mi (voices)		
2017	Tulip Fever	Sophia Sandvoort		
2017	Euphoria	Ines Thompson	Also producer	
2017	Submergence	Danielle Flinders		
2017	Moomins and the Winter Wonderland	Little My, Sorry-oo (voices)		
2018	The Magic Diner Part II	Herself	Short film	
2018	Tomb Raider	Lara Croft		
2018	Arden's Wake: Tide's Fall	Meena (voice)	Short film; also executive producer	
2018	Anthropocene: The Human Epoch	Narrator	Documentary film	
2019	I Am Easy to Find	Woman	Short film	
2019	Earthquake Bird	Lucy Fly		
2020	The Glorias	Gloria Steinem		
2021	Blue Bayou	Kathy LeBlanc		
2021	The Green Knight	Essel, The Lady		
2021	Beckett	April Hanson		
2023	Firebrand	Catherine Parr		
2024	Rumours	Celestine Sproul		
2024	The Assessment	Virginia		
2025	The Wizard of the Kremlin	Ksenia		
2026	Hope	J'aur		
2026	The Last Day	Julia		
2026	The Echo Chamber †	Anne	Completed	
TBA	The Turning Door †	(voice)	In production	

=== Television ===
Year	Title	Role	Notes	Ref.
2002	Min balsamerade mor	Ebba Du Rietz	Television documentary	
2003	The Befallen	Drabbad Mörker	Episode: "Slutet"	
2005	En decemberdröm	Tony	14 episodes	
2007	Levande föda	Linda	3 episodes	
2007–08	Andra Avenyn	Jossan Tegebrandt Björn	39 episodes	
2008	Höök	Katarina	2 episodes	
2018	Imagine	Narrator	Episode: "Ingrid Bergman in Her Own Words"	
2019	One Red Nose Day and a Wedding	Faith	Short television film	
2019	The Dark Crystal: Age of Resistance	Mira (voice)	Episode: "End. Begin. All the Same."	
2022	Irma Vep	Mira Harberg, Musidora	8 episodes; also executive producer	

=== Theatre ===
Year	Title	Role	Local	Ref.
2025	The Lady from the Sea	Ellida	Bridge Theatre, London	

== Other credited works ==
In 2020, Vikander recorded a narration of the audiobook chapter "Pippi Longstocking Moves Into Villa Villekulla", supporting the global charitable initiative "Pippi of Today", a collaboration between The Astrid Lindgren Company and Save the Children, to create awareness and raise money for girls on the move.

In 2021, Vikander recorded the song "Blue Bayou", which is featured in the Blue Bayou (Original Motion Picture Soundtrack). In 2022, Vikander reprised her role as Lara Croft for the attraction Tomb Raider: The Live Experience in Camden Market, providing voiceover for the character.

In 2026, Vikander was announced as the narrator of Merregnon: Heart of Ice. The Decca Classics album, recorded with the London Symphony Orchestra at Abbey Road Studios, features Nobuo Uematsu’s first original large-scale work written for the concert hall.

== See also ==
- List of actors with Academy Award nominations
- List of oldest and youngest Academy Award winners and nominees
- List of Swedish actors
