= Euphoria (2017 film) =

- Film poster
- Directed by: Lisa Langseth
- Screenplay by: Lisa Langseth
- Produced by: Patrik Andersson; Frida Bargo; Charles Collier; Alicia Vikander
- Starring: Alicia Vikander; Eva Green; Charlotte Rampling; Charles Dance; Adrian Lester; Mark Stanley
- Cinematography: Rob Hardy
- Edited by: Dino Jonsäter
- Music by: Lisa Holmqvist
- Production companies: B-Reel; Dancing Camel Films; SF Studios; Vikarious Productions
- Distributed by: Svensk Filmindustri (Sweden); Wild Bunch (Germany)
- Release dates: 8 September 2017 (TIFF); 2 February 2018 (Sweden); 5 April 2018 (Germany)
- Running time: 104 minutes
- Countries: Sweden; United Kingdom; Germany
- Language: English
- Box office: $79,451

Euphoria is a 2017 mystery drama film written and directed by Lisa Langseth in her English-language debut. An international co-production of Sweden, the United Kingdom and Germany, the film screened in the Platform section at the 2017 Toronto International Film Festival. It received generally negative reviews.

== Plot ==
Emilie (Eva Green) and Ines (Alicia Vikander) Thompson are two sisters with very different characters who live far apart and rarely see each other. Now Ines, an artist trying to cope with unfavourable reviews of her latest exhibition, has accepted Emilie's invitation to accompany her on a short trip to an unknown place in the heart of Europe. The hotel Emilie has chosen for the first few days of her stay is very luxurious, as is the restaurant where she plans to dine; she evasively explains to her sister that she has sold her flat because she wants to go back to studying. During dinner, she agrees to dance with a stranger, to whom she confides that she is convinced Ines is only with her because her career is on the decline, adding that she "has no more time to lie". She therefore rejects the man's advances on the grounds that she would like to have an adventure but that this is not possible for her; immediately afterwards she feels very uncomfortable, which she attributes to the champagne she has drunk.

Their destination, which Emilie describes as "the most beautiful place in the world", turns out to be an estate lost in the woods beyond an unspecified country border, where they are met by an elderly woman, Marina (Charlotte Rampling), who describes herself as Emilie's "personal companion". For the unsuspecting Ines, it is the moment of truth: Emilie reveals to her that she has cancer, has been undergoing unsuccessful treatment for three years, and has therefore chosen assisted suicide; the place to which she has taken her is actually an exclusive clinic where patients can spend their last six days in complete peace before taking their own lives by poisoning themselves after a simple ritual. Ines is distraught and cannot accept that Emilie has kept everything from her, but her sister bitterly claims that she did it because it was the only way she could accompany her on her final journey. In fact, during their stay, the two will repeatedly confront each other harshly about their conflicting life choices: Emilie has remained close to her mother, who fell into depression because of her separation from her husband, until her suicide; Ines soon distanced herself from her, accused her of weakness and victimhood, and did not even go to the funeral, building a nice career as an excuse for her constant absence and creating a kind of armour of rationality and self-preservation. At the clinic, the two women not only meet but also the charming Mr Daren (Charles Dance), also terminally ill, a wealthy playboy who is now an old man and organises a party on his last night, and Brian (Mark Stanley), a former footballer who has been paralysed and rendered impotent by a car accident and who, attracted to Emilie, spends a night with her, arousing her anger that he has decided to leave life behind despite his health. Marina also reveals a little about herself, saying that she stayed at the clinic after accompanying her dying husband there two years earlier because she "couldn't find a reason to leave". Ines feels a mixture of disgust and attraction for the place and takes some photos with Daren's complicity for personal inspiration, even though she knows it is forbidden by the rules. At the height of another argument with her sister, she decides to leave early, but Marina stops her with a ruse and listens to her outburst, which turns from a blind rage against her mother and sister to a desolate lament for her growing sense of abandonment. Finally ready to face her pain, Ines makes peace with Emilie, who is now dying, shares fond childhood memories with her and prepares her for suicide.

Everything happens as planned. Emilie confirms that she has voluntarily chosen death and quietly poisons herself in front of Ines, who leaves the clinic. When she says goodbye to Marina, she gives her Emilie's ring - which belonged to her mother - and reveals to her that she knows about the photos she took and asks her to use them according to her conscience. In the helicopter that takes off to the sounds of David Bowie's "Rock 'n' Roll Suicide", she is joined by Brian, who has chosen life thanks to his encounter with Emilie.

== Cast ==
- Alicia Vikander as Ines
- Eva Green as Emilie
- Charlotte Rampling as Marina
- Charles Dance as Mr. Daren
- Adrian Lester as Aron
- Mark Stanley as Brian

== Production ==
The film was said to be in early development by December 2013, and was originally slated for a 2015 release. In an early 2016 interview, Langseth confirmed that her third feature film would discuss the rising phenomenon of assisted suicide in Europe, and was described as taking place in a "fictional euthanasia clinic."

On 6 May 2016 it was announced that Alicia Vikander and her London-based agent Charles Collier had launched Vikarious Productions. The first feature for the company was set to be Euphoria, directed by Langseth and featuring Vikander and Green in the lead roles as sisters. In June, it was reported that Charlotte Rampling had joined the cast in an unspecified role. Charles Dance, Adrian Lester and Mark Stanley were announced to have joined the cast in August.

Principal photography began in early August 2016 in Munich, before moving to the German Alps.
