= Love & Anarchy (TV series) =

Swedish television series

- Swedish: Kärlek och anarki
- Genre: Romantic comedy
- Created by: Lisa Langseth
- Starring: Ida Engvoll; Björn Mosten; Johannes Bah Kuhnke; Björn Kjellman; Reine Brynolfsson; Gizem Erdogan; Carla Sehn
- Composers: Kristian Selin Lidnes Andersen; Adam Nordén
- Country of origin: Sweden
- Original language: Swedish
- No. of seasons: 2
- No. of episodes: 16

Production
- Executive producers: Frida Asp; Pontus Edgren; Martina Håkansson
- Producer: Fatima Varhos
- Cinematography: Ulf Bråntos
- Editors: Henrik Källberg; Elin Pröjts
- Running time: 25–33 minutes
- Production companies: FLX; Setkeeper

Original release
- Network: Netflix
- Release: 4 November 2020 – 16 June 2022

Love & Anarchy (Swedish: Kärlek och anarki) is a Swedish romantic comedy television series. It is Netflix's second Swedish-language series, following Quicksand. It was produced by the same company, FLX. The series was created by Lisa Langseth, who also served as the head writer, together with Alex Haridi. The story follows a professional married woman with children who finds herself playing a daring game with a young male employee.

The first season premiered on 4 November 2020, the second on 16 June 2022.

== Premise ==
Sofie is an ambitious consultant and married mother of two children living in Stockholm. When Sofie receives the order to restructure an old and well-established publishing house, Lund & Lagerstedt, her orderly life begins to fall apart at the seams. It begins when she meets the young IT expert Max, for whom she has unexpected and daring flirtation. In the process, they develop a game whereby they both take turns challenging each other to do things that contradict established social norms.

Their harmless games soon turn into bitter seriousness as the challenges, and the resulting consequences, become bigger and more uncontrollable.

== Cast and characters ==
- Ida Engvoll as Sofie Rydman, a successful consultant and married mother of two
- Björn Mosten as Max Järvi, the IT temp at Lund & Lagerstedt
- Johannes Bah Kuhnke as Johan Rydman, Sofie's controlling and manipulative husband, a successful commercial director
- Björn Kjellman as Ronny Johansson, the weak-willed CEO of Lund & Lagerstedt
- Reine Brynolfsson as Friedrich Jägerstedt, one of the veteran publishers at Lund & Lagerstedt
- Gizem Erdogan as Denise Konar, one of the veteran publishers at Lund & Lagerstedt
- Carla Sehn as Caroline Dahl, the receptionist at Lund & Lagerstedt

== Episodes ==
No.	Title	Directed by	Written by	Original release date
1	"How It All Began"	Lisa Langseth	Lisa Langseth	4 November 2020
Sofie is a successful married mother of two starting a six month consultancy helping indie publishing house Lund & Lagerstedt turn digital in order to survive. At work she is frustrated multiple times by Max, the young IT consultant whose noisy drilling interrupts her day. Sofie tells Max to drill off-hours and so he comes in late at night to finish his work, inadvertently catching Sofie masturbating at her desk and taking a picture of her in the act. The next day he shows her the picture and teases her by loudly drilling near her office. After Sofie offers Max money to delete the photo, he surprises her by asking her to simply buy him lunch at Burger King. After allowing her to verify that the photo is gone, Sofie steals Max's phone, saying she will only return it in exchange for Max doing something fucked up at work. As the publishing house becomes embroiled in a scandal involving one of their authors going public about being sexually harassed by another one of their authors, Max defuses the situation by posting a "clit pic" to the press's Instagram account and claiming they were hacked by haters of free speech. Sofie returns Max's phone and then gives him her favourite lipstick, asking him to tell her what to do in order to get it back.
2	"Surprise Me"	Lisa Langseth	Lisa Langseth	4 November 2020
Sofie learns that the publishing house has committed to a multi-million dollar advance to actress Lena Endre. Hoping for a gossipy confessional about her romance with director Ingmar Bergman they are surprised to find the end product a poorly written dreck and that Endre's relationship with Bergman was purely professional. At work Max challenges Sofie to yell at someone who is not him. When her attempts go awry she finally succeeds in yelling at a man who bumps into her on the street and later discovers the man was Endre's agent and because of the kerfuffle the press is now releasing Endre's memoir unedited. Sofie attends an event with her husband, a successful commercial director, but after some networking makes him feel old and over the hill, he mocks Sofie in front of their friends by bringing up her long abandoned writing ambitions, including the novel she wrote called Love & Anarchy. To comfort herself, she challenges Max to create a little anarchy during their meeting the following morning.
3	"StreamUs"	Lisa Langseth	Lisa Langseth	4 November 2020
The publishing house deals with the details of The Train an award-winning novel they published which is being turned into a movie to be aired on StreamUs. Tired of viewing successive versions of the movie, Friedrich signs off on the final version of the film without seeing it, only to discover the ending has been drastically altered. Unable to change it, Friedrich finds himself unable to tell the author the truth. At work, with Ronny gone for the day, Sofie orders Max to act like the CEO. When he completes the dare he challenges Sofie to dress up like her favourite singer, Cyndi Lauper, for the day.
4	"Permanent Employment"	Lisa Langseth	Lisa Langseth	4 November 2020
After learning that Ronny has sold his company to StreamUs and that he intends to implement a hiring freeze, Sofie counsels Max to become a permanent employee of the company. After being refused by Ronny, Max complains to his roommate, who employs a harebrained scheme to get Ronny to change his mind. When Max succeeds, he kisses Sofie and then challenges her to walk backwards for the rest of the day, which she does at work and then continues to do at home, much to her husband's displeasure.
5	"The Book Fair"	Lisa Langseth	Lisa Langseth	4 November 2020
At an important book fair, Sofie and Max can't stop daring each other to do increasingly risky activities. When Sofie orders Max to liven up a luncheon, he spikes the deserts with cannabis which cause Friedrich and Denise to get high and botch their presentation on the merger between Lund & Lagerstedt and StreamUs.
6	"Regrets"	Lisa Langseth	Lisa Langseth	4 November 2020
After having sex at the book fair, Sofie tries to avoid Max. When he turns up at her home they are interrupted by her husband. Sofie later apologizes and the two reconcile, eventually having sex in Max's crowded apartment. Sofie tries to play the good wife and mother at home, but her daughter's birthday is interrupted by her father's left-wing ravings, causing a disaster for the entire family. Meanwhile the publishing house tries to get past the disaster at the book fair by throwing one of their authors under the bus and provoking his ex-wife (Lisa Langseth), now a reviewer, into writing a scathing review of his new book.
7	"Ayahuasca"	Lisa Langseth	Lisa Langseth	4 November 2020
Rattled by her father's stint in a psychiatric ward, Sofie focuses on protecting her daughter Isabell who is overcome with grief. When her husband makes fun of Sofie for using a metaphor from her abandoned novel to comfort Isabell, she decides to go behind his back and allow Isabell to see her father. Meanwhile Max heads home for his stepfather's birthday after being challenged by Sofie to stand up to his domineering and controlling mother.
8	"The Present, Eternity and the Action Plan"	Lisa Langseth	Lisa Langseth	4 November 2020
After learning that Sofie brought their daughter to visit her father in the psychiatric ward, her husband makes vague threats about her mental health which cause Sofie to quit her job and accept his suggestion that they move to London for a year. She abruptly breaks up with Max at work, telling him that they were only playing a game. When her husband makes allusions to medicating her while at a spa, Sofie runs away and returns to the press in time to torpedo their presentation for StreamUs.

=== Season 2 ===
No. overall	No. in season	Title	Directed by	Written by	Original release date
9	1	"Everything is Different Now"	Lisa Langseth	Lisa Langseth, Alex Haridi	16 June 2022
A newly separated Sofie continues seeing Max while looking for a new job now that she has left Lund & Lagerstedt. When she receives a tip from her ex that friends of theirs are looking to invest in audio content she helps broker a deal between her friends and Lund & Lagerstedt which results in her being installed back in the company as CEO.
10	2	"Jagerstedt Publishing"	Lisa Langseth	Lisa Langseth, Alex Haridi	16 June 2022
Friedrich secures his first author for his new imprint, his former lover who might give him more than he's bargained for. Sofie and Max each try to move on from each other with new partners.
11	3	"The Sensitivity Consultant"	Lisa Langseth	Lisa Langseth, Alex Haridi, Maria Nygren	16 June 2022
After one of their children's books comes off as insensitive to climate change the company decides to hire a sensitivity consultant to review the content of their books. Caroline pressures Max into defining their relationship while a jealous Sofie tries to break them up.
12	4	"Literature Killers!"	Lisa Langseth	Lisa Langseth, Alex Haridi, Josefin Johansson	16 June 2022
Protests heat up outside Lund & Lagerstedt as authors discover the company plans to force authors with poor sales records to finance their own publications. While Sofie advises her co-workers to ignore the protests they become more and more intrusive, eventually torpedoing her deal with a Swedish influencer Sofie hopes to attract to the company.
13	5	"Literary Cruise"	Emma Bucht	Lisa Langseth, Alex Haridi, Josefin Johansson	16 June 2022
The Lund & Lagerstedt attend a literary cruise where a jealous Sofie, seeing Caroline and Max together, challenges Max to get as drunk as possible. Worried over sea sickness, Friedrich misses the cruise and begs Denise to take care of Vivienne which goes in a different direction than he would have planned.
14	6	"Exorcism"	Emma Bucht	Lisa Langseth, Alex Haridi, Maria Nygren	16 June 2022
After a slew of authors leave Lund & Lagerstedt Sofie finally agrees to let Max's Instagram be turned into a book in order to attract new authors. As he witnesses Sofie struggling after her father's death Max challenges Sofia to talk to someone which causes her to go to a psychiatrist, a priest, and a self help guru in order to finally stop seeing visions of her father.
15	7	"What Is Genuine and Does It Really Matter?"	Emma Bucht	Lisa Langseth, Alex Haridi	16 June 2022
Vivianne's book betrays Denise. Max and Caroline end up alone. Sofie's story is stolen by Malin.
16	8	"Art, Love, Capitalism and the Courage to Change Their Conditions"	Emma Bucht	Lisa Langseth, Alex Haridi	16 June 2022
Vivianne's good news solves many problems, elevating quality literature as well. Sophie wants to get back with Max, but he wants her to prove it she really means it. Sofie opens up in a public interview at the office during Vivienne's celebrations and says finally what she really thinks. Max from home listens to the live Sophie's speech and comes later back to her. They kiss.

== Reception ==
=== Critical response ===
Love & Anarchy was met with a very positive reviews from critics. On the review aggregator website Rotten Tomatoes, 100% of 7 critics' reviews are positive, with an average rating of 8.0/10.

Reviewing for The Age, Debi Enker awarded the first season with a four out of five star rating, noting: "Love & Anarchy can be laugh-out-loud funny, sexy and sad. Although the final episode suggests that Langseth didn't quite know how to end the story, for the most part it's an enjoyable and unusual ride."
