= Norrtull Hospital =

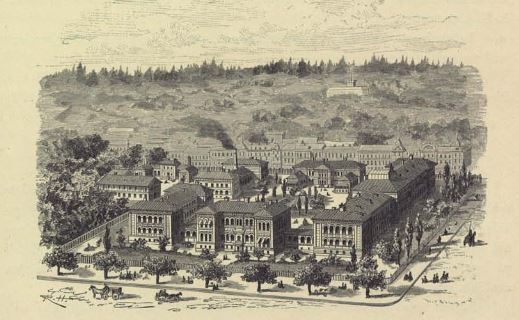

Geography
- Location: Vasastan, Stockholm, Sweden, Sweden
- Coordinates: 59°20′46″N 18°2′55″E

History
- Opened: 1920s
- Closed: 2004

Links
- Lists: Hospitals in Sweden

Norrtull Hospital (Swedish: Norrtulls sjukhus) in Vasastan, Stockholm, Sweden was erected 1883–85 as a model orphanage, converted in the 1920s to a children's hospital that in 1951 was relocated to the Karolinska Institute and later renamed to Astrid Lindgren Children's Hospital. Norrtull Hospital was then converted into a geriatric hospital, and in the 1990s to a psychiatric clinic. As the buildings in 2004 were deemed inappropriate, they have been sold on the open market.

The school Viktor Rydberg Gymnasium is since 2015 located to a part of Norrtulls sjukhus, which Lilla Akademien is as well.

== Gallery ==
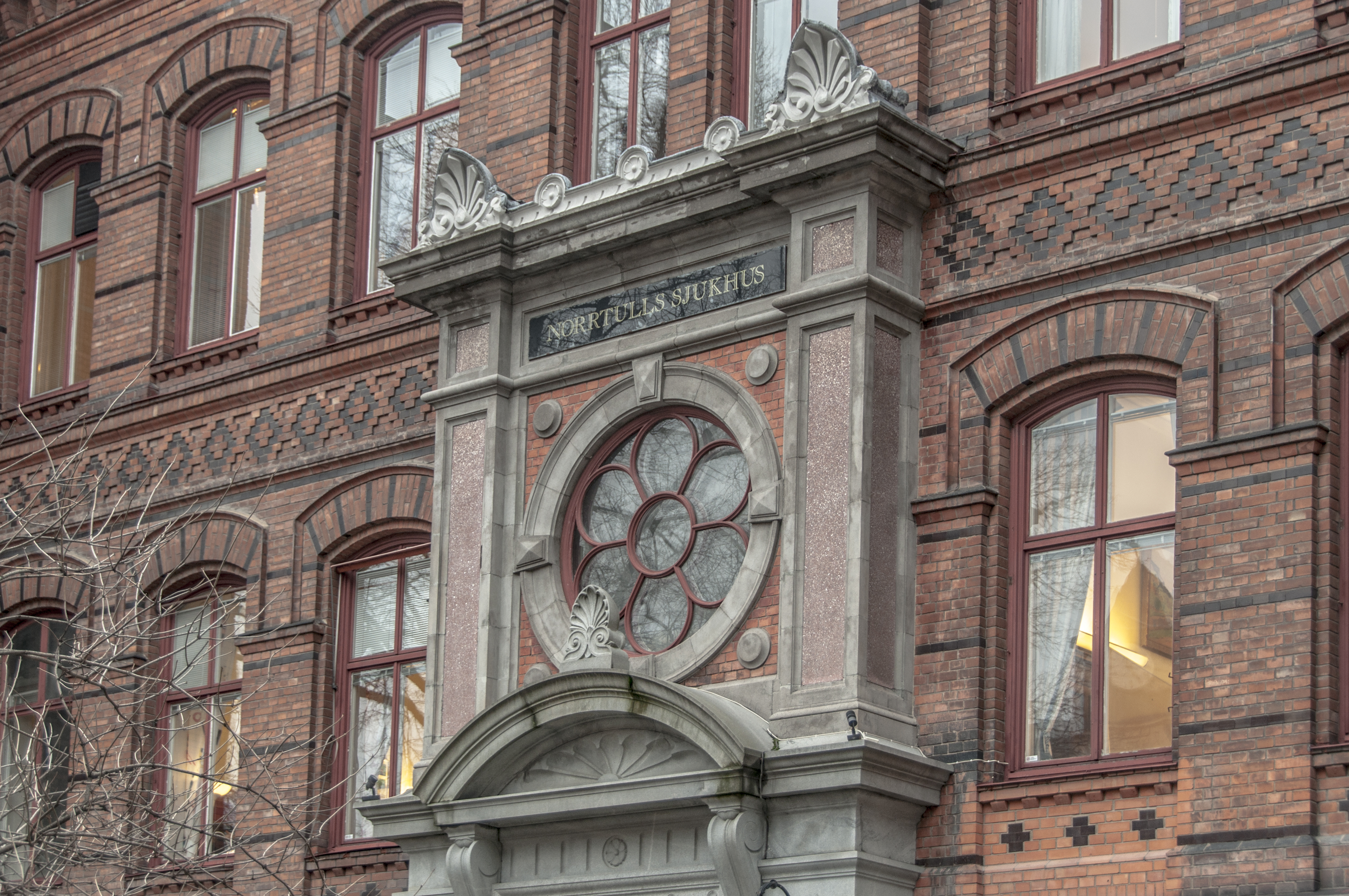
Facade

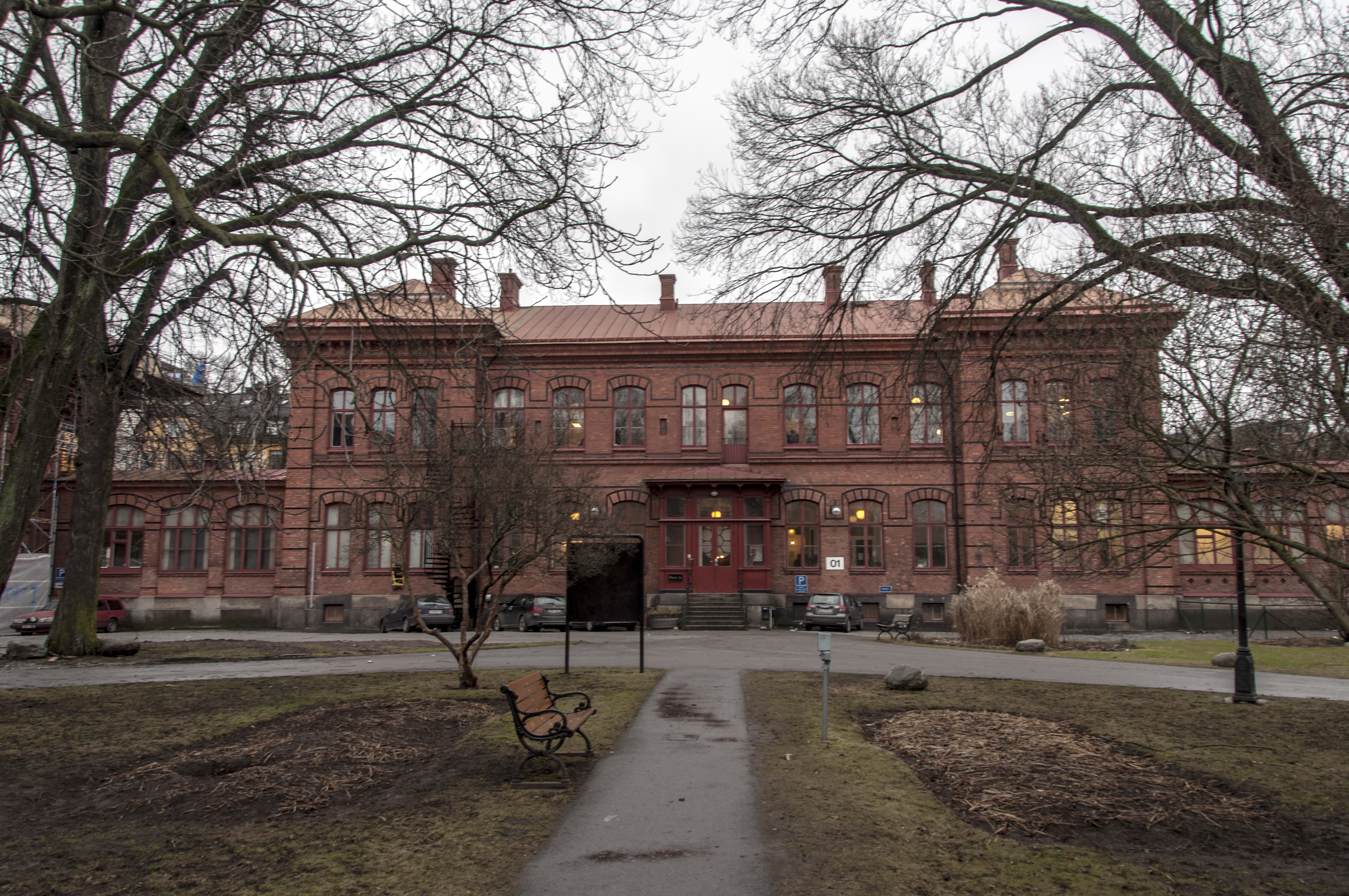
Office

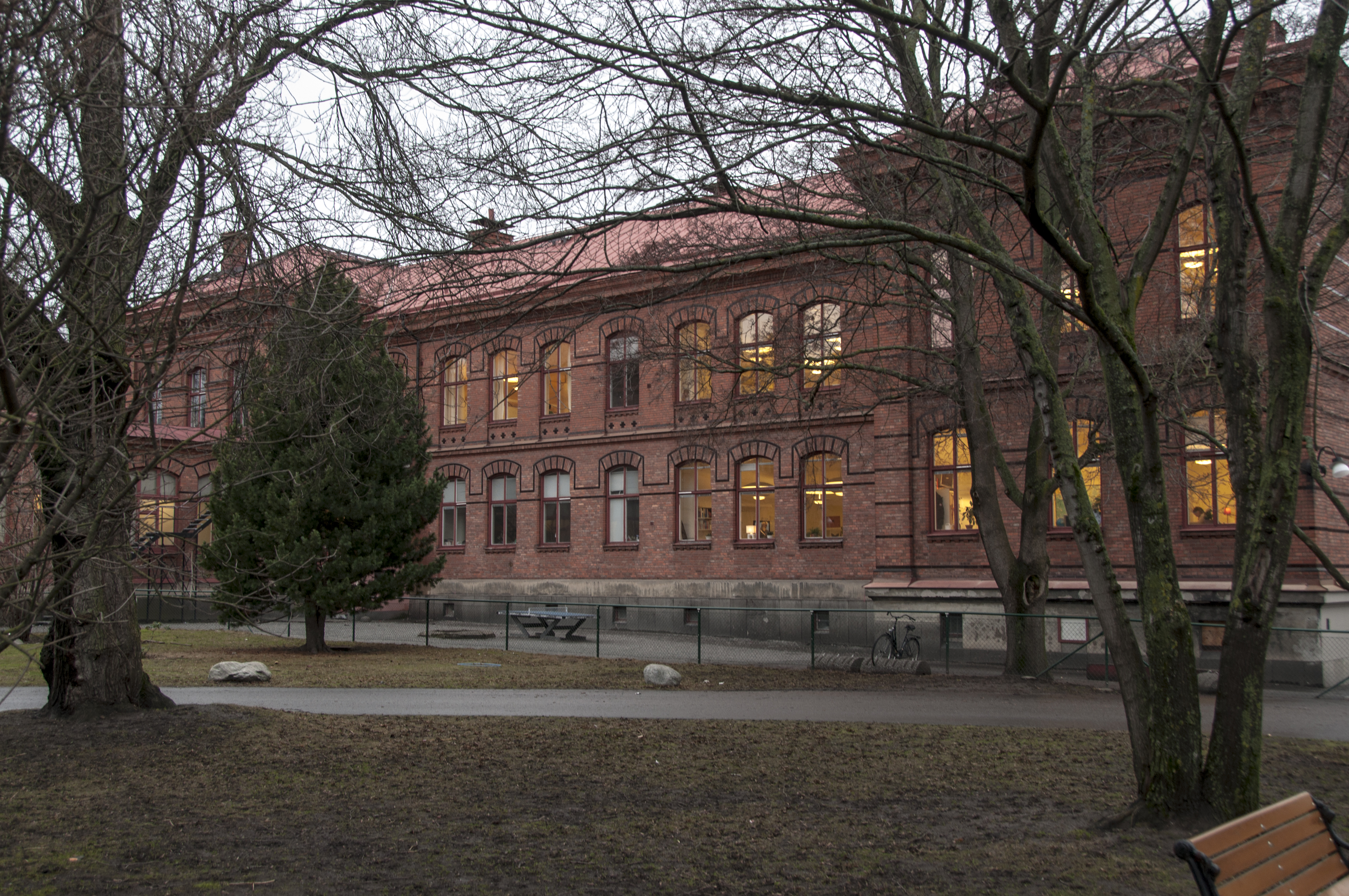
North pavilion

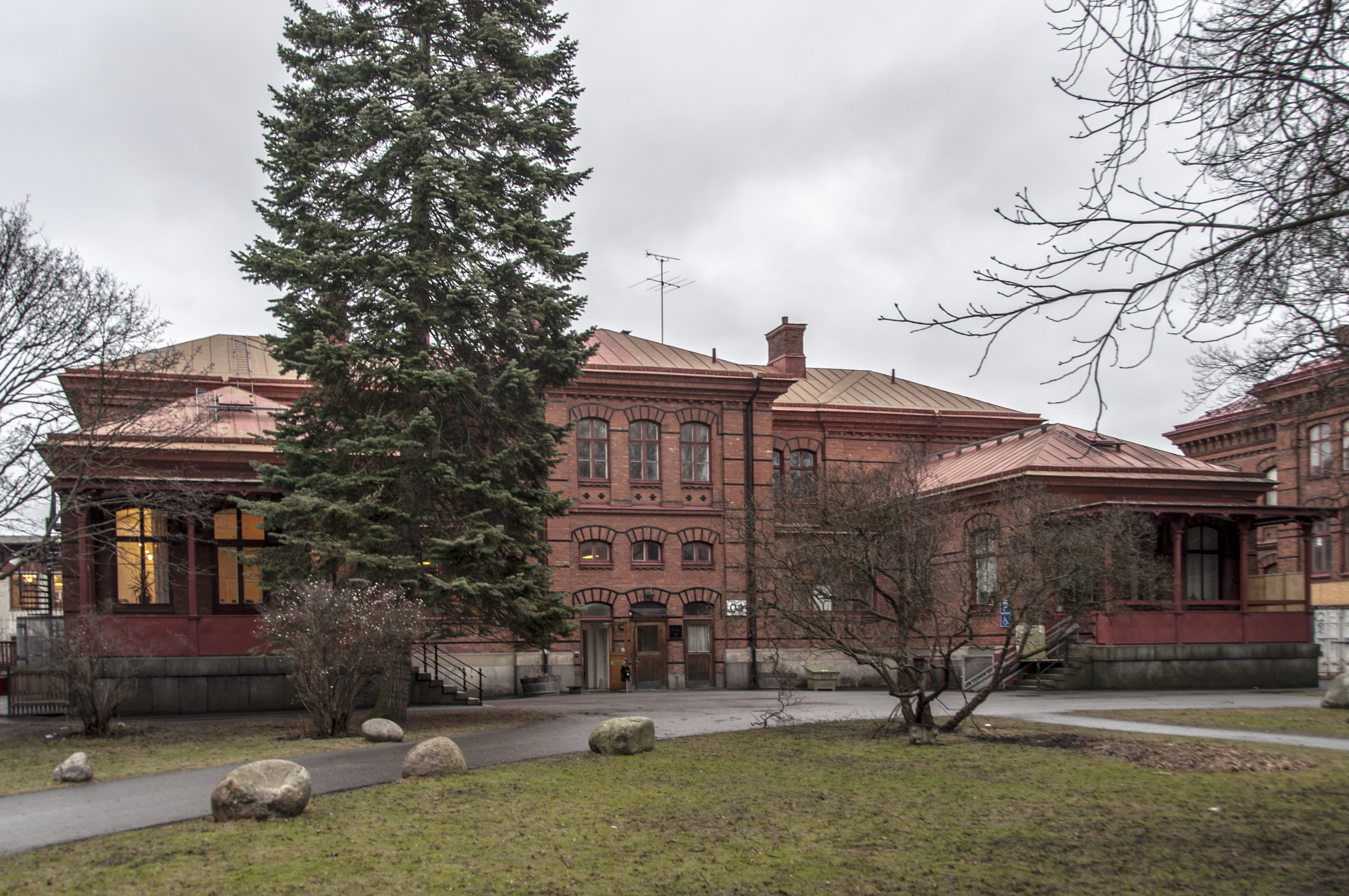
East pavilion

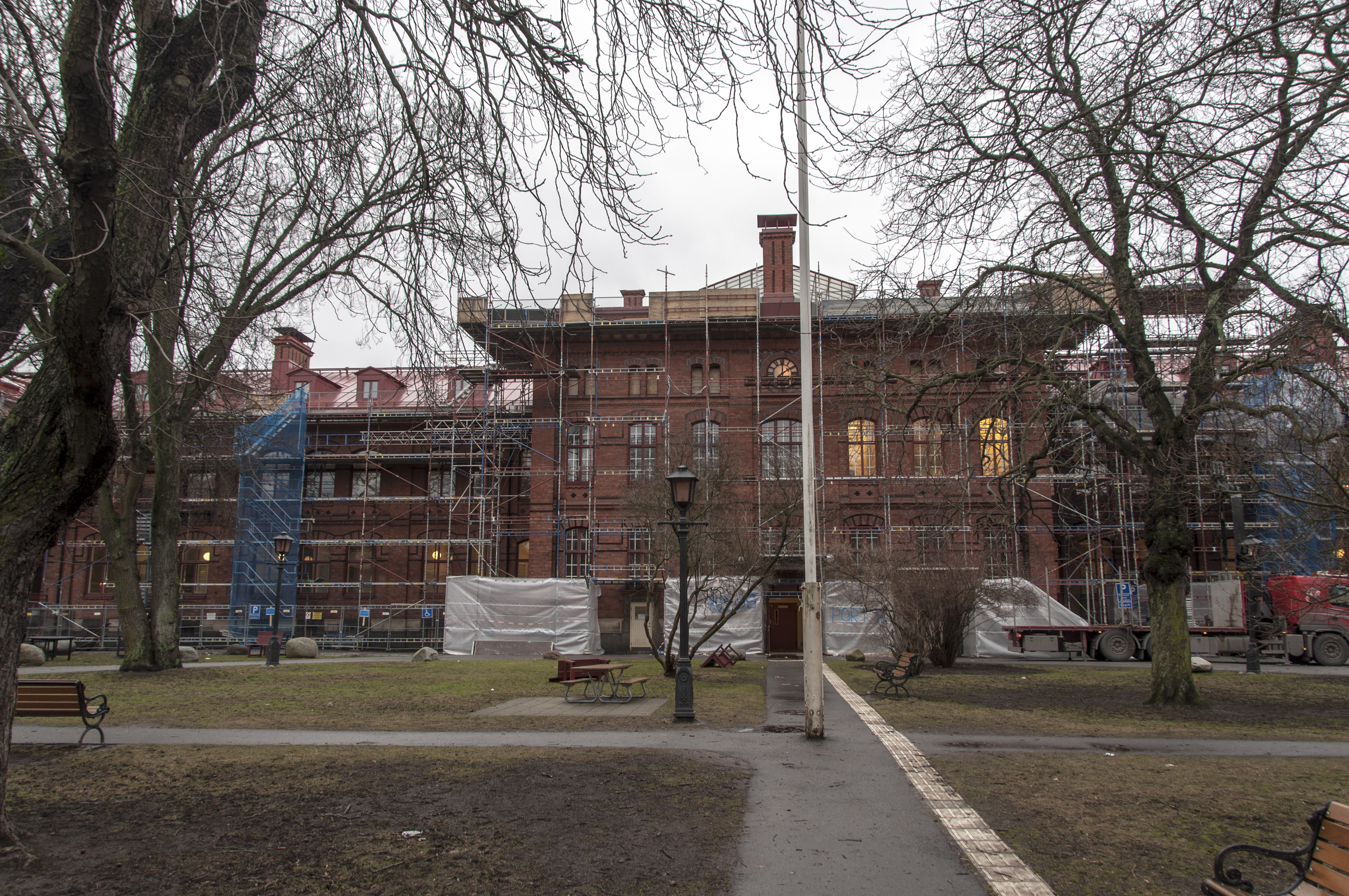
South pavilion

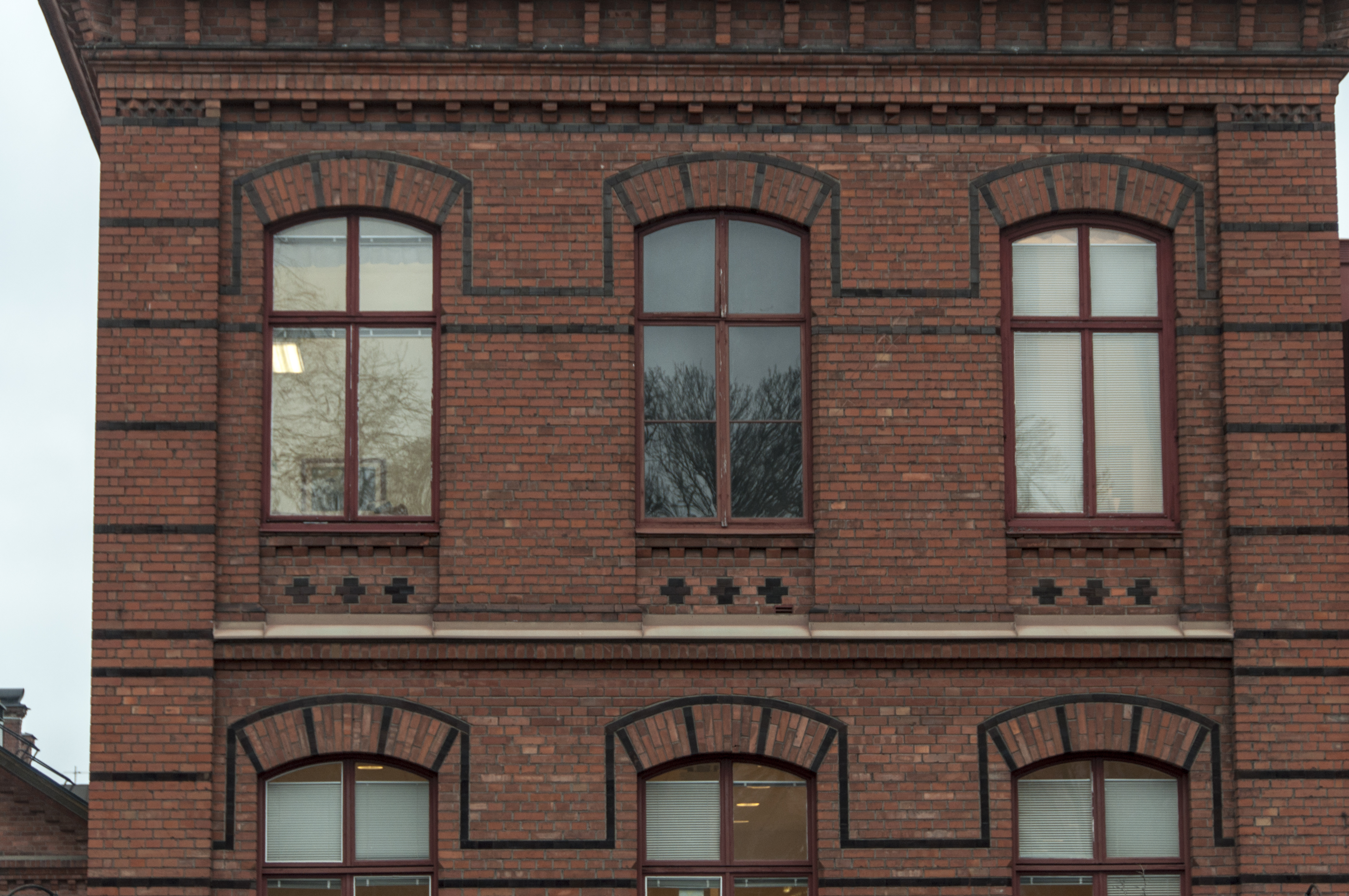
Kitchen

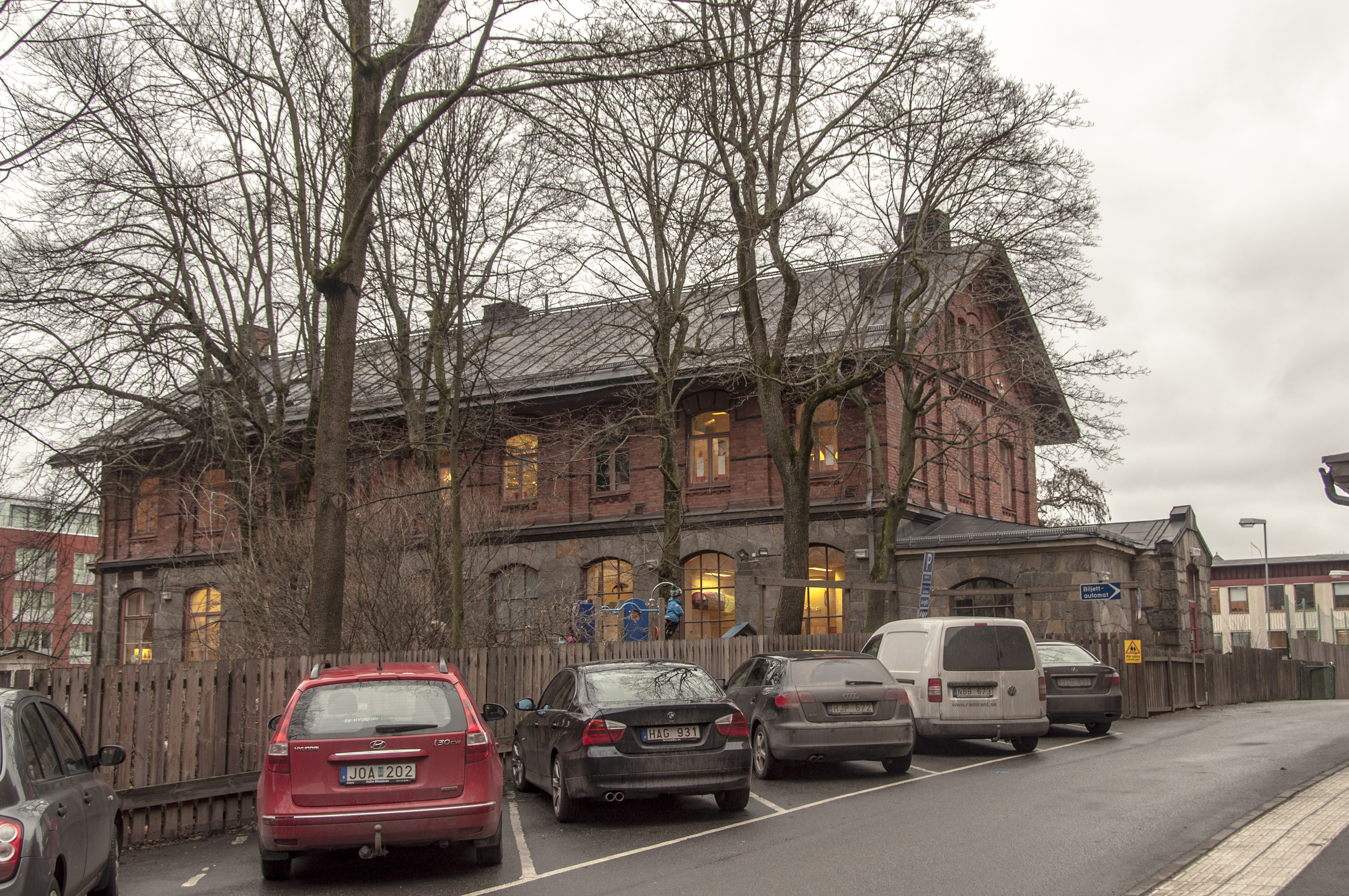
Laundry

== See also ==
- Stockholm City Centre
- Viktor Rydberg Gymnasium
- Lilla Akademien
