= Nasser Razazi =

Naser Razzazi
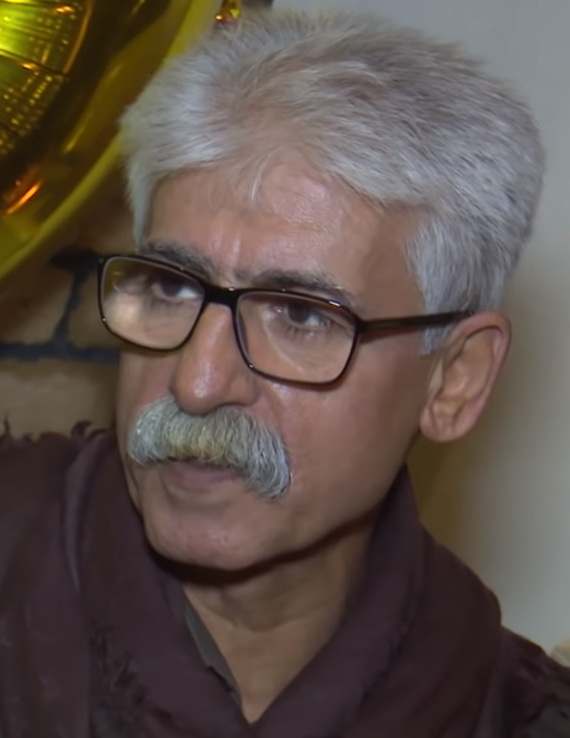
- Naser Razazi, December 2018

Background information
- Born: June 21, 1955 (age 70); Sanandaj, Iran
- Genres: Kurdish Folk Music
- Occupations: Poet, writer, singer, performer
- Instruments: Kurdish daf-drum
- Years active: 1970s–present

Naser Razzazi (Persian: ناصر رزازی, born June 21, 1955) is an Iranian Kurdish singer, poet and writer. His music encompasses traditional Kurdish folk songs in four different Kurdish dialects, Sorani, Kurmanji, Gorani and Kelhori.

Naser Razzazi, was born to a poor family in Iranian Kurdistan, but has lived most of his life in exile, mainly in ¹Sweden.

In addition to singing, and since his early days as a school teacher, Rezazî has contributed to Kurdish literature and art through his music and poetry that combine different Kurdish genres, dialects and musical styles. Nasser Razazi said in an interview with the Persian section of Radio France that since his adolescence and throughout his life he had dreamed of living in Tehran, but due to financial poverty and low social status, Nasser's dream never came true and he was forced to seek refuge in the mountains of Iraqi Kurdistan and join the guerillas of Komalak.

In 2024 Razazi announced that he planned to retire once he completed his final musical albums.

== Personal life ==
Naser was married to an artist of her own right, Merziye Feriqi, until her death in 2005. He has since remarried.

He fought as a peshmerga-soldier in Iranian Kurdistan, under the political Kurdish political party Komalah for the struggle of an independent Kurdistan. During his period as a guerrilla soldier, fighting for the Kurdish cause, his first audience was namely the peshmerga.

== Discography ==
(selective)

- 1976: Kurdistan (کوردستان)
- 1976: Katana (کەتانە)
- 1979: Dêwane Xom (دێوانە خۆم)
- 1982: Gomeşîn (گۆمەشین)
- 1984: Le Gulan (لە گوڵان)
- 1988: Helebce (ھەڵەبجە)
- 1993: Rezyane (ڕەزیانە)
- 1994: Nyaz (نیاز)
- 1995: Be Pîroz (بە پیرۆز)
- 1995: Hîwa (هیوا)
- 1996: Xemî Nan (خەمی نان)
- 2000: Kirmaşan (کرماشان)
- 2010: Êwareye (ئێوارەیە)
- 2012: Bîrewerî (بیره‌وه‌ری)
- 2016: Gulbaran (گوڵباران)
- 2019: Şarekem (شارەکەم)
