= Evil (novel) =

1981 novel by Jan Guillou

Ondskan
- Swedish edition
- Author: Jan Guillou
- Language: Swedish
- Genre: Autobiographical novel
- Published: 1981 (P. A. Norstedt)
- Publication place: Sweden
- Media type: Print (Hardback)
- Pages: 285 pp
- ISBN: 91-1-811332-X
- OCLC: 9115662
- LC Class: MLCS 81/2426

Evil (Swedish: Ondskan) is a Swedish novel by Jan Guillou.

== Plot summary ==
Erik Ponti is a fourteen-year-old boy living in the 1950s Stockholm lower middle class. His sadistic father beats him often, his mother rarely intervenes in the abuse and his six-year-old brother takes advantage of the situation. He excels in school subjects that interest him; "He ran the fastest and scored the most goals, could take a gargantuan beating, hit with full strength at the first punch and on top of all that he was the superior student in several subjects", which lends him a position as gang leader and favored student of half his teachers. (He compulsively leads the class to rebel against the other half, who beat the students.)

He lives with violence both at home and at school and begins feeling sympathy and pity towards those he beats, when his life comes tumbling down because of the school gang's criminal activities. Betrayed by those he thought of as his friends, the gang, he is expelled from school and "pre-emptively" expelled from every school in Stockholm by his zealous and influential principal.

He comes home prepared to face his father "for the last time" but is surprisingly sent to a boarding school outside of the city, the expensive and exclusive Stjärnsberg school. Away from his father and everyone who knew him, Erik is determined to make a new life without violence for himself, but the traditions of the school stop him. Unable to abide the abuse of the senior students, who make it their habit to boss around and beat those below them, "especially new and mouthy kids", he begins a spiral of escalating violence and psychological abuse under the nose of unwitting teachers and adults. Noses are broken, threats are uttered, buckets of feces thrown around and Erik spends a cold winter night soaking wet and tied to the ground.

Erik and his friend and roommate Pierre hold in-depth discussions about the nature of evil, the importance of resistance and methods of fighting, while spending summer and winter breaks abroad. Erik develops a forbidden relationship with Marja, a school cook from Savonia, Finland, and wins a swimming trophy in a school championship.

He is thrown out of the swimming team in an attempt to make him follow orders, and begins working out obsessively by weightlifting to vent his frustrations, panicked over the prospect of being expelled if he lays a hand on a senior student. When Pierre surrenders to the abuse directed at him to punish Erik and leaves the school, Erik takes to stalking the woods in disguise at night and systematically breaking the nose and teeth of those responsible, when he finds them alone.

Marja, fired because of the suspicions of her relationship with Erik, sends him a love letter which the principal uses as grounds to have him expelled, but with the aid of Mr. Ekengren, the family lawyer, Erik threatens legal action over the confiscation of his mail and is allowed to finish his last semester in relative peace, although not before tracking down his chief tormentor, the chairman of the students' council Otto Silverhjelm, alone in the woods and scaring him into hysteric crying and vomiting.

Finishing his basic education with the highest possible grades — barring the lowest possible grade in conduct and behavior — Erik returns home and deals with his father.

== Semi-autobiographical ==
Jan Guillou has stated that Ondskan is basically a true story. "Some things, like the identity of the love interest, the placing of the swimming pool and such were changed to make the story better. But the stuff you're wondering about - the violence, the crap, the psychological terror - is absolutely true." Indeed, the school Guillou went to was scandalized in the newspapers and bankrupted a few years after his graduation, and he speaks in interviews of his extensive and personal experience of violence.

== Characters ==
Erik Ponti is a teenager hardened by his abusive stepfather, who rebels against anyone who would use their authority to hurt people, fighting with peerless physical and intellectual prowess. He is the autobiographical alter ego of Jan Guillou, and appears in later novels.

Farsan (Dad) is a waiter at a high-class restaurant in Stockholm and Erik's father. He's a sadist who habitually makes up excuses to beat Erik - but never his little brother - and secretly lets his twin large dobermanns loose to kill a small dog who enters his property, for his amusement.

Pierre Tanguy is chubby, unathletic, bespectacled and maybe the most brilliant student ever at Stjärnsberg. He is mostly left alone by bullies who consider him "no challenge", until his friendship with Erik makes him a target. The exception to the rule against teachers abusing students, he is ridiculed by the history teacher who uses his body to point at examples of "undesirable" qualities. He also appears in later novels.

Otto Silverhielm gains the highest authority among the students' ranks during Erik's second year at Stjärnsberg, and uses every opportunity to punish his subjects physically. Nicknamed "Skitenhielm" (Shitehelm) by his victims, he seems to enjoy hitting people, leading to discussions about him being evil, sadistic or a victim of misdirected aggression.

== Reception ==
Ondskan has been read by more than two million (out of ten million) Swedes.

== In popular culture ==
In 2002 Claes Bang asked the theatre director of the Aalborg Teater for permission to perform a monologue called Ondskaben, which is based on Evil. After leaving the theatre in 2004, Bang bought the rights to the work so he could perform the monologue at other theatres. He has performed the monologue almost 400 times, including an English language version in Denmark, Sweden, the UK, Germany, and South Africa.

== Adaptations ==
- In 1995 Ondskan was dramatized by Benny Haag from Dramaten.
- In 1998 the Danish Theatre La Balance converted the above play to a 70-minute monologue performed by Thomas W. Gabrielsson.
- Claes Bang has performed a monologue based on the book since 2002.
- A film based on the novel was released in 2003.
- A television series based on the novel was released in 2023.
