= Viveca Sten =

Swedish writer and lawyer

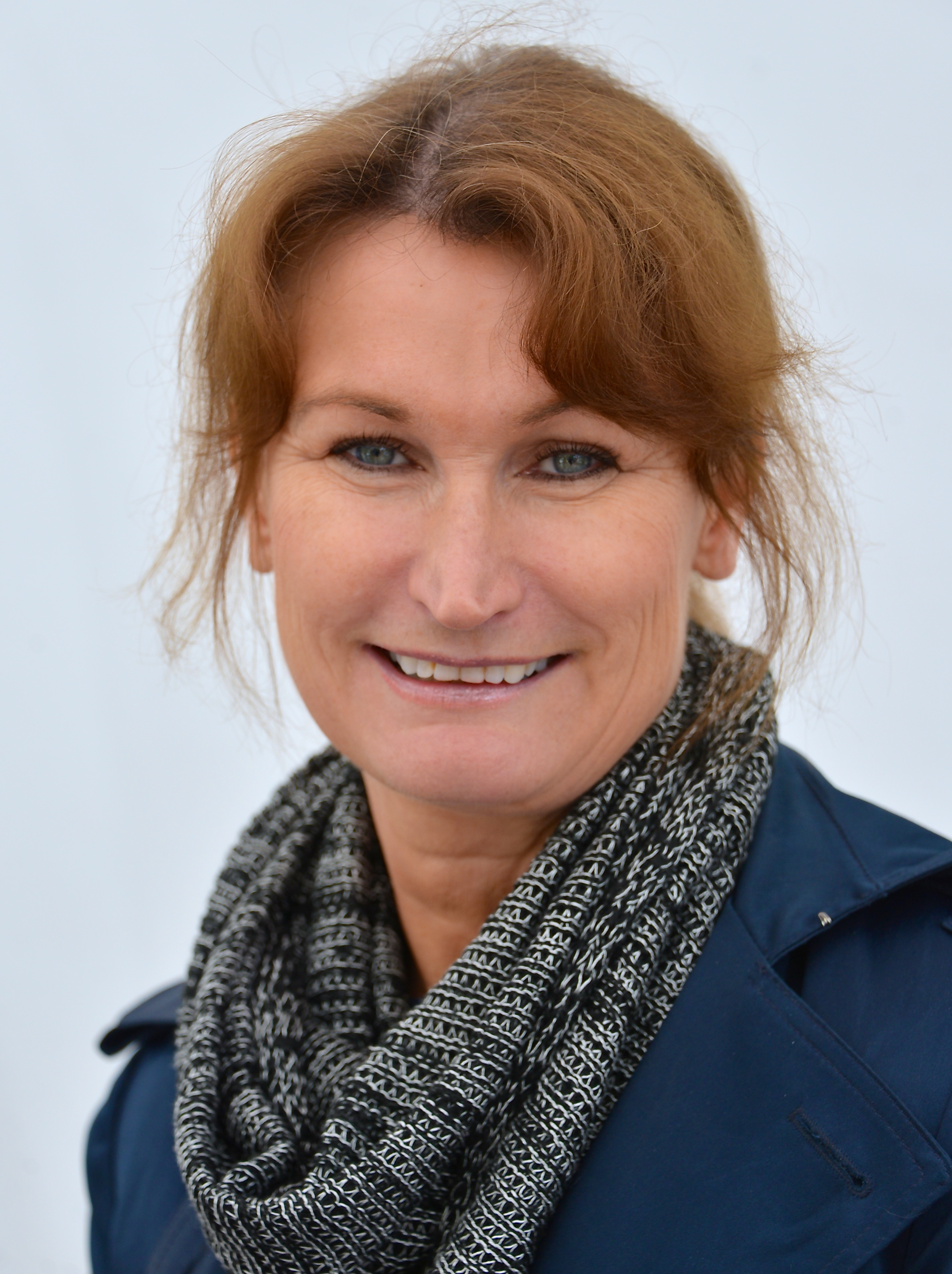
Viveca Sten

Viveca Sten (née Bergstedt; 18 June 1959, in Stockholm) is a Swedish writer and lawyer. She has a law degree from Stockholm University and has an MBA from the Stockholm School of Economics. Previously, she worked at Scandinavian Airlines, has had a highly successful legal career as a lawyer and held the position as General Counsel at PostNord (the Swedish & Danish mail service), but left in 2011 to focus on her writing. Viveca lives with her family just north of Stockholm. Since 1917, Viveca's family have spent all their summers at Sandhamn, a small settlement in the central-peripheral part of the Stockholm Archipelago where her crime fiction novels are set frequently. She is perhaps best known for the book series Sandhamn Murders.

== Selected works ==
=== Fiction ===
- 2008, I de lugnaste vatten (English translation: Still Waters, 2015 - Sandhamn Murders Book 1)
- 2009, I den innersta kretsen (English translation: Closed Circles, 2016 - Sandhamn Murders Book 2)
- 2010, I grunden utan skuld (English translation: Guiltless, 2017 - Sandhamn Murders Book 3)
- 2011, I natt är du död (English translation: Tonight You’re Dead, 2017 - Sandhamn Murders Book 4)
- 2012, Julbord i skärgården
- 2012, Ett gott nytt år
- 2012, I stundens hetta (English translation: In the Heat of the Moment, 2018 - Sandhamn Murders Book 5)
- 2013, I farans riktning (English translation: In Harm's Way, 2018 - Sandhamn Murders Book 6)
- 2014, I maktens skugga (English translation: In the Shadow of Power, 2019 - Sandhamn Murders Book 7)
- 2015, I sanningens namn (English translation: In the Name of Truth, 2020 - Sandhamn Murders Book 8)
- 2016, Djupgraven (English translation: The abyss)
- 2017, Iskalla ögonblick
- 2018, I fel sällskap (English translation: In Bad Company, 2021 - Sandhamn Murders Book 9)
- 2019, I hemlighet begravd (English translation: Buried in Secret, 2022 - Sandhamn Murders Book 10)
- 2020, Offermakaren (English translation: Hidden in Snow - The Åre Murders Book 1)
- 2021, Dalskuggan (English translation: Hidden in the Shadows - The Åre Murders Book 2)
- 2025, Botgöraren (English translation: Hidden in Memories - The Åre Murders Book 3)
- 2026, Offermakaren (English translation: Hidden in Lies - The Åre Murders Book 4)
- 2027, Benådaren (English translation: Hidden in Mercy - The Åre Murders Book 5)

=== Non-fiction ===
- Förhandla i affärer (Negotiating in Business)
- Outsourcing av IT-tjänster (Outsourcing IT Services)
- Internationella avtal – i teori och praktik (International Agreements—In Theory and Practice)

== See also ==
- Morden i Sandhamn, Swedish television crime drama adapted from Sten's "Sandhamn Murders" series
- Crime fiction
- The Åre Murders, Swedish crime drama from novels Hidden in Snow and Hidden in the Shadows.
