= Pure (2010 film) =

- Film poster
- Swedish: Till det som är vackert
- Directed by: Lisa Langseth
- Written by: Lisa Langseth
- Starring: Alicia Vikander; Samuel Fröler; Martin Wallström
- Release dates: October 2010 (Busan); 22 October 2010
- Running time: 97 minutes
- Country: Sweden
- Language: Swedish

Pure (Swedish: Till det som är vackert; lit. 'To that which is beautiful') is a 2010 Swedish drama film directed and written by Lisa Langseth. Alicia Vikander's performance won the Guldbagge Award for Best Actress in a Leading Role at the 46th Guldbagge Awards.

== Plot ==
20-year-old Katarina (Alicia Vikander) finds solace in Mozart's music despite the difficult circumstances she lives in. Her mother is an alcoholic, and she relies on her boyfriend Mattias (Martin Wallström) for support. Despite having little in common, Mattias accompanies Katarina to a classical concert to fulfil her love for Mozart. However, after a fight with some students, Katarina loses her job at the school and finds herself wandering aimlessly.

By chance, she ends up at the municipal concert hall, where she is mistaken for a job seeker and invents a dramatic story about her mother. This leads to her being hired as a receptionist. Katarina pretends to be the daughter of an Australian concert pianist who died from cancer. As she immerses herself in the world of classical music, she becomes distant from both Mattias and her mother. She starts having an affair with Adam, a married conductor.

Eventually, Katarina is promoted to a higher position in the youth department of the concert hall. She breaks up with Mattias, who throws her out, but Adam breaks up with her as well as his wife returns. Katarina loses her job as Adam is pressuring her supervisor to fire her. She is sleeping in the street. Katarina begs for her job back to Adam but he laughs at her. In rage, she pushes him from the window while he was smoking.

After his death, considered as accidental as he used to smoke on the window edge, she is back at work. She is attending a concert surrounded by children and teenagers.

== Cast ==
- Alicia Vikander as Katarina
- Samuel Fröler as Adam
- Martin Wallström as Mattias
- Josephine Bauer as Birgitta
- Helén Söderqvist Henriksson as personnel manager
- Kim Lantz as janitor
- Frederik Nilsson as Henrik
- Elisabeth Göransson as Agneta, social secretary
- Ylva Gallon as nurse
- Anna Åström as Cicci
- Magnus Lindberg as Nille
