= Lisa Langseth =

Swedish screenwriter and film director (born 1975)

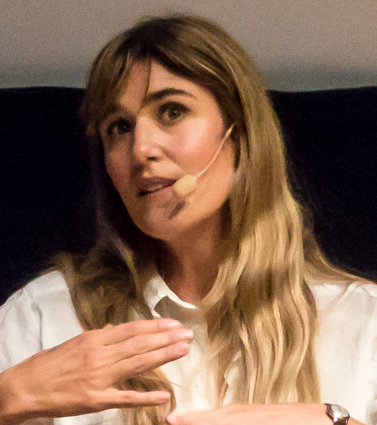
- Langseth in 2017
- Born: 20 April 1975 (age 51); Stockholm, Sweden
- Education: Stockholm Academy of Dramatic Arts
- Occupations: Playwright, screenwriter, director
- Years active: 2004–present

Lisa Langseth (born 20 April 1975) is a Swedish screenwriter and film director. Her writing and directing film credits include Pure (2009), Hotell (2013), Euphoria (2017), and The Dance Club (2025).

== Career ==
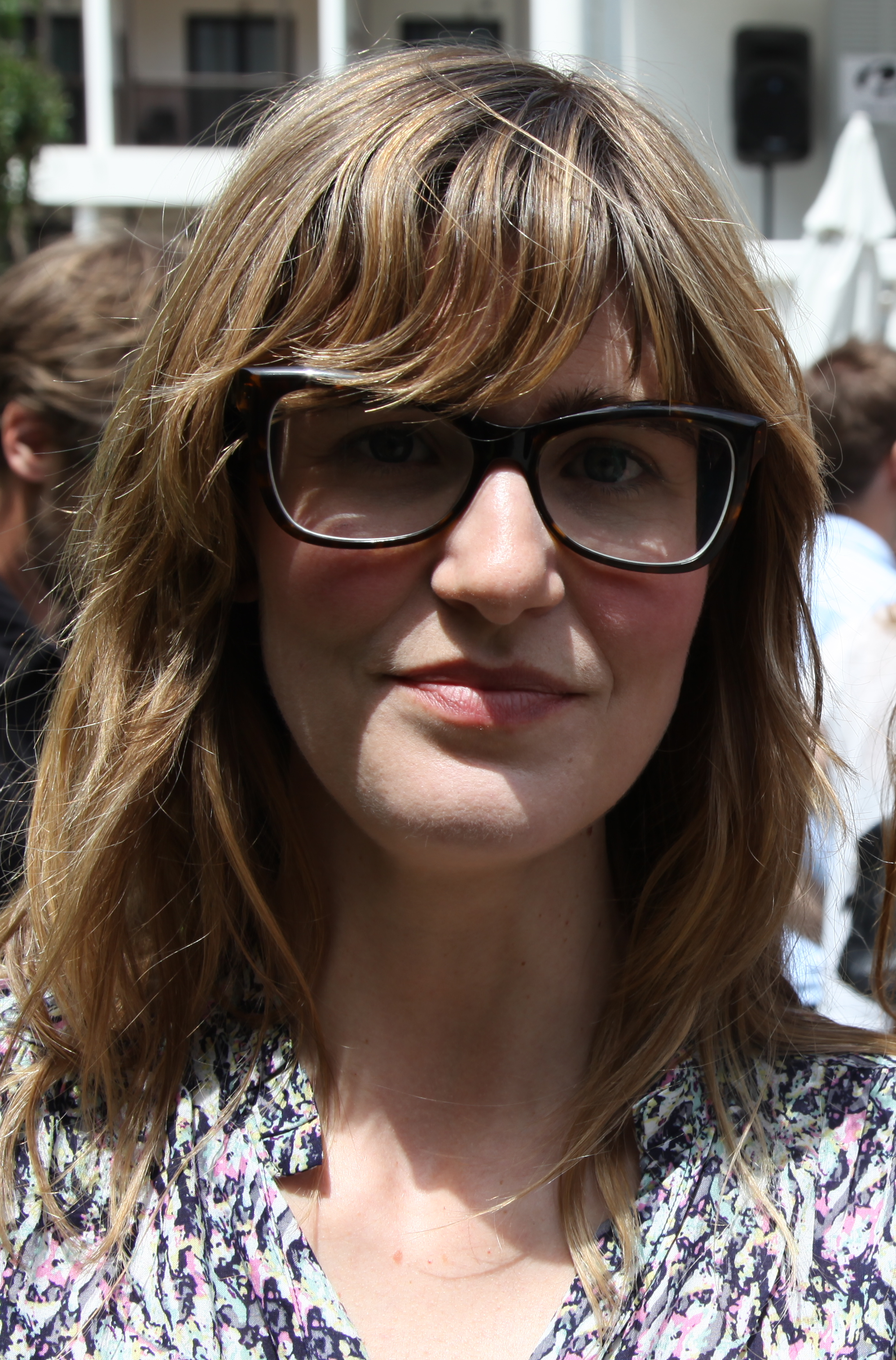
Langseth at the 2012 Cannes Film Festival

Langseth began her career as a playwright and theatre director. In 2004 she directed Noomi Rapace in the play Beloved which she had also written. In 2006 she directed the short film Godkänd.

In 2009 she directed her debut film Pure, an adaptation of one of her plays starring Alicia Vikander as Katarina. Langseth was awarded the 2010 Guldbagge Award for Best Screenplay for her work on the film, along with receiving a nomination for the Guldbagge Award for Best Director.

Langseth's 2013 comedy-drama Hotell debuted at the 2013 Toronto International Film Festival in the Contemporary World Cinema program. The film reunited her with Alicia Vikander. For her work in the film, she received a nomination for the 2014 Guldbagge Award for Best Screenplay.

Her most recent film is titled Euphoria, featuring regular collaborator Vikander, along with Eva Green and Charlotte Rampling. It has been described as a drama film set in a "fictional euthanasia clinic." It was her English-language debut and had a 2017 release. It describes a conflict between two sisters, Ines (Alicia Vikander) and Emilie (Eva Green), who then travel through Europe towards a mystery destination. It is described as a drama/mystery.

In 2019, Netflix announced that Langseth would be the creator for its second Swedish-language TV series, Love & Anarchy. It premiered on Netflix on 4 November 2020.

== Filmography ==
- Pure
- Hotell
- Euphoria
- Love & Anarchy
- The Dance Club
