= Evil (Swedish TV series) =

2023 Swedish drama television series

- English poster
- Swedish: Ondskan
- Genre: Drama; Thriller
- Based on: Evil by Jan Guillou
- Screenplay by: Fredrik T Olsson; Hans Gunnarsson; Jan Guillou
- Directed by: Erik Leijonborg; Daniel di Grado
- Starring: Isac Calmroth; Thea Sofie Loch Næss; Ruth Vega Fernandez; Gustaf Skarsgård
- Music by: Adam Nordén
- Country of origin: Sweden
- Original language: Swedish
- No. of seasons: 1
- No. of episodes: 6

Production
- Executive producers: Tim King; Susann Billberg-Rydholm; Erik Leijonborg
- Producer: Tobias Åström
- Cinematography: Adam Nordén
- Editor: Sebastian Amundsen
- Production company: SF Studios

Original release
- Network: C More; TV4
- Release: 2 November – 30 November 2023

Evil (Swedish: Ondskan) is a six-episode 2023 Swedish drama-thriller series, based on Jan Guillou's 1981 novel of the same name.

== Cast ==
- Isac Calmroth as Erik Ponti
- Thea Sofie Loch Næss as Marja
- Ruth Vega Fernandez as Karin Ponti
- Gustaf Skarsgård as Åke Ponti
- Jens Hultén as Tosse Berg
- Alexander Gustavsson as Pierre Tanguy
- Christian Fandango Sundgren as Otto Silverhielm
- Björn Mosten as Leffler
- Leon Henzel as Bernhard Von Schrantz

== Production ==
In March 2022, it was announced that Jan Guillou's 1981 novel Evil would be adapted into a six-episode TV series for C More and TV4. The series was written by Fredrik T Olsson and was produced by SF Studios.

The book had been previously adapted into a successful 2003 film of the same name, in which Gustaf Skarsgård played Otto Silverhielm. In the series he was cast as Erik's father.

The series was filmed in Lithuania.

== Reception ==
The series received mixed to negative reviews from Fredrik Sahlin in Dagens Nyheter and Julia Finnsiö in Svenska Dagbladet. Writing for Aftonbladet, Karolina Fjellborg described the series as "fascinating but drawn-out."
