= Lilla Akademien =

Swedish children's music school

Coordinates: 59.3459°N 18.0484°E

- Type: Independent
- Established: 1994
- Location: Stockholm, Sweden
- Website: www.lillaakademien.se

Lilla Akademien is a music school founded 1994. It is located in Stockholm, Sweden.

== History ==
Lilla Akademien, translated as "The Junior Academy", specializes in classical, jazz, and to a degree, folk music. Housed in a historic building in the Stockholm district Norrmalm, it was founded in 1994 by a group of music teachers.

In its early years, it provided instrumental tuition for young children, but since 1998 it offers full-time tuition in music and regular schooling for children from 6 years and up into adolescence. It eventually expanded to include a gymnasium or senior high school, and in 2005 the first graduates got their high school diplomas.

In 2006 Lilla Akademien opened a post-gymnasial 'Pre-College' one-year program.

Today, Lilla Akademien offers lessons and courses in the majority of orchestral instruments. Students also receive theoretical musical education, ear training, and lessons in music history and music analysis. It has multiple ensembles and orchestras, which have been on many international tours.
