= 49th Guldbagge Awards =

Swedish awards ceremony

- Date: January 20, 2014
- Site: Cirkus, Stockholm
- Hosted by: Sissela Kyle

Highlights
- Best Picture: The Reunion
- Most awards: Waltz for Monica (4)
- Most nominations: Waltz for Monica (11)

Television coverage
- Network: SVT
- Duration: 2 hours

The 49th Guldbagge Awards ceremony, presented by the Swedish Film Institute, honored the best Swedish films of 2013 and took place January 20, 2014, at Cirkus in Stockholm. During the ceremony, the jury presented Guldbagge Awards (commonly referred to as Bagge) in 19 categories. The ceremony was televised in the Sweden by SVT, with actress and comedian Sissela Kyle hosting the show for the third time. The ceremony also celebrated the prize's 50th anniversary.

Waltz for Monica won four awards including Best Actress for Edda Magnason and Best Director for Per Fly. The Reunion won two awards for Best Film and Best Screenplay. Other winners included We Are the Best! with two awards, and Nobody Owns Me, Hotell, The Tenderness, Belleville Baby, On Suffocation, Blue Is the Warmest Colour, Sanctuary, Faro and Shed No Tears with one.

== The jury ==
Through discussions the jury appoints the winners of the Guldbagge Award among the three nominees in all price categories, except for the Honorary Award which is appointed directly by the Swedish Film Institute's board. The jury consisted this year of Jannike Åhlund (chairman), Anna Carlson (actress and chairman of The Swedish Union for Performing Arts and Film), Bengt Forslund (producer and writer), Jan Holmberg (ceo, Ingmar Bergman Foundation), Anne-Marie Söhrman Fermelin (consultant of Film Stockholm/Filmbasen and producer), Kathrine Windfeld (director), Farnaz Arbabi (director and playwright), Sylvia Ingemarsdotter (film editor) and Marcus Lindeen (director and playwright).

== Winner and nominees ==
The nominees for the 49th Guldbagge Awards were announced on January 3, 2014 in Stockholm, by the Swedish Film Institute.

Films with the most nominations were Waltz for Monica with eleven, followed by Shed No Tears with nine. The winners were announced during the awards ceremony on January 20, 2014.

=== Awards ===
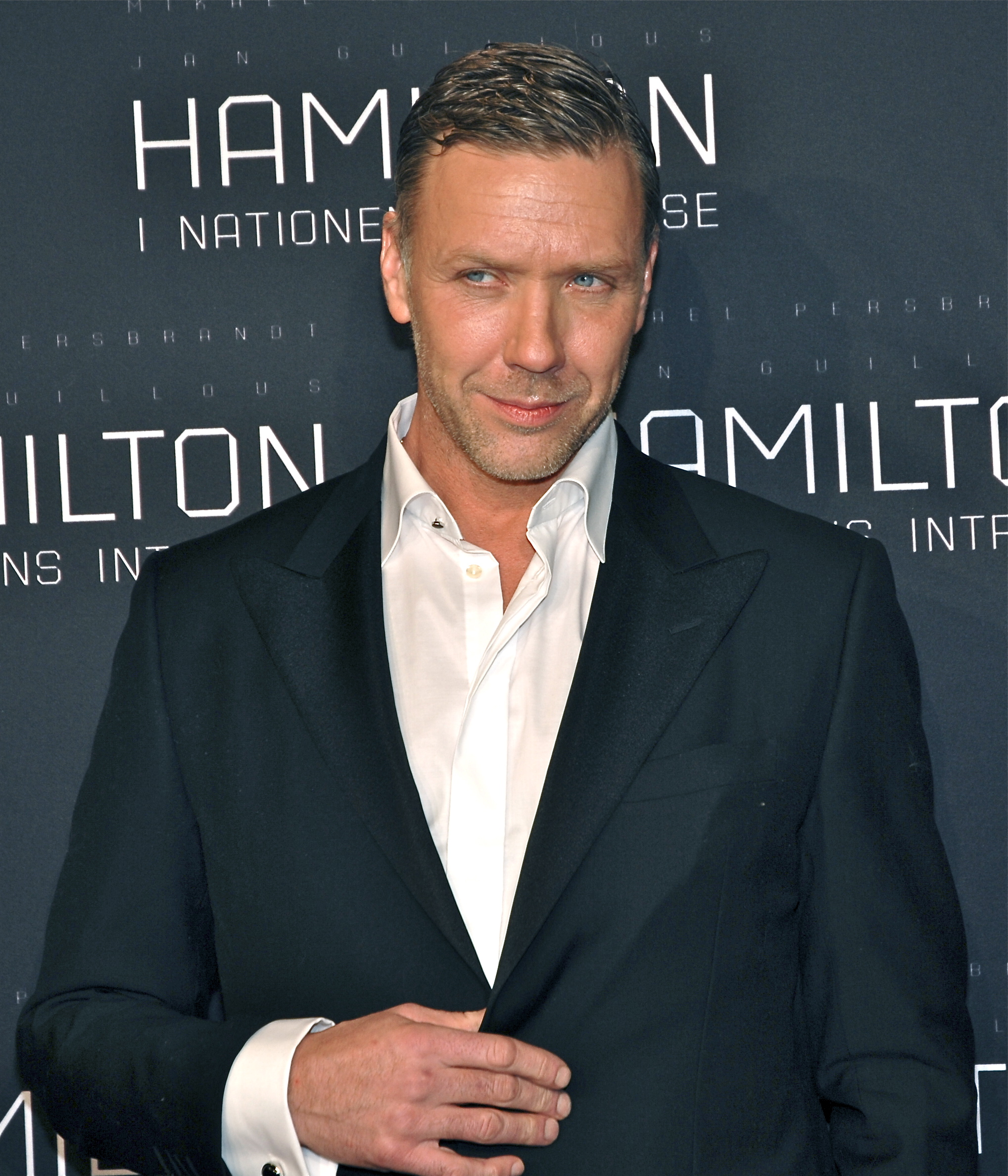
Mikael Persbrandt, Best Actor winner

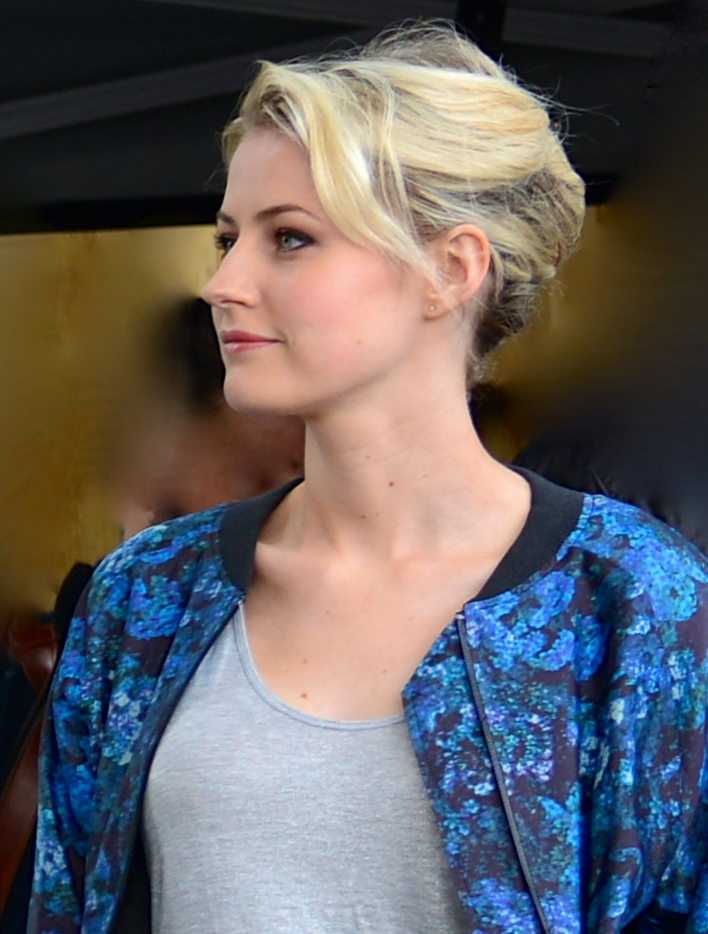
Edda Magnason, Best Actress winner

Winners are listed first and highlighted in boldface.

**Best Film**: **The Reunion**; Shed No Tears; Waltz for Monica	**Best Director**: **Per Fly – Waltz for Monica**; Måns Mårlind and Björn Stein – Shed No Tears; Anna Odell – The Reunion
**Best Actress in a leading role**: **Edda Magnason – Waltz for Monica**; Anna Odell – The Reunion; Gunilla Röör – En gång om året	**Best Actor in a leading role**: **Mikael Persbrandt – Nobody Owns Me**; Robert Gustafsson – The Hundred-Year-Old Man Who Climbed Out the Window and Disappeared; Matias Varela – Easy Money III: Life Deluxe
**Best Supporting Actress**: **Anna Bjelkerud – Hotell**; Mira Eklund – Hotell; Josefin Neldén – Shed No Tears	**Best Supporting Actor**: **Sverrir Gudnason – Waltz for Monica**; Kjell Bergqvist – Waltz for Monica; David Dencik – Hotell
**Best Screenplay**: **Anna Odell – The Reunion**; Cilla Jackert – Shed No Tears; Lisa Langseth – Hotell	**Best Cinematography**: **Petrus Sjövik – The Tenderness**; Eric Kress – Waltz for Monica; Erik Sohlström – Shed No Tears
**Best Documentary Feature**: **Belleville Baby**; Forest of the Dancing Spirits; No Burqas Behind Bars	**Best Shortfilm**: **On Suffocation**; Me Seal, Baby; Äta lunch
**Best Foreign Film**: **Blue Is the Warmest Colour (France)**; 12 Years a Slave (United States); The Turin Horse (Hungary)	**Best Art Direction**: **Paola Holmér and Linda Janson – We Are the Best!**; Wilda Wiholm – Shed No Tears; Josefin Åsberg – Waltz for Monica
**Best Original Score**: **Matti Bye – Faro**; Matti Bye – The Hundred-Year-Old Man Who Climbed Out the Window and Disappeared; Peter Nordahl – Waltz for Monica	**Best Sound Editing**: **Mattias Eklund – Shed No Tears**; Petter Fladeby, Andreas Franck and Jens Johansson – Easy Money III: Life Deluxe; Hans Møller – Waltz for Monica
**Makeup and Hair**: **Lisa Mustafa – We Are the Best!**; Eva von Bahr – Waltz for Monica; Eva von Bahr and Love Larson – The Hundred-Year-Old Man Who Climbed Out the Window and Disappeared	**Best Costume Design**: **Kicki Ilander – Waltz for Monica**; Moa Li Lemhagen Schalin – We Are the Best!; Ulrika Sjölin – Shed No Tears
**Gullspiran**: **Lukas Moodysson**	**Cinema Audience Award**: **The Hundred-Year-Old Man Who Climbed Out the Window and Disappeared**; Waltz for Monica; The Anderssons Hit the Road
**Honorary Award**: **Kalle Boman**

== Multiple nominations and awards ==
The following films received one or multiple nominations:

- Eleven: Waltz for Monica
- Nine: Shed No Tears
- Four: Hotell and The Reunion
- Three: The Hundred-Year-Old Man Who Climbed Out the Window and Disappeared, Easy Money III: Life Deluxe and We Are the Best!
- Two: Belleville Baby
- One: Nobody Owns Me, En gång om året, Forest of the Dancing Spirits, Faro, No Burqas Behind Bars, Me Seal, Baby, On Suffocation and Äta lunch

The following four films received multiple awards:

- Four: Waltz for Monica
- Two: The Reunion and We Are the Best!
