= 42nd Guldbagge Awards =

Swedish awards ceremony

- Date: 22 January 2007
- Site: Cirkus, Stockholm
- Hosted by: Sissela Kyle

Highlights
- Best Picture: Kidz in da Hood
- Most awards: Kidz in da Hood (5)
- Most nominations: Kidz in da Hood, When Darkness Falls & Falkenberg Farewell (4)

Television coverage
- Network: SVT

The 42nd Guldbagge Awards ceremony, presented by the Swedish Film Institute, honored the best Swedish films of 2006, and took place on 22 January 2007. Kidz in da Hood directed by Ylva Gustavsson and Catti Edfeldt was presented with the award for Best Film.

== Winner and nominees ==
=== Awards ===
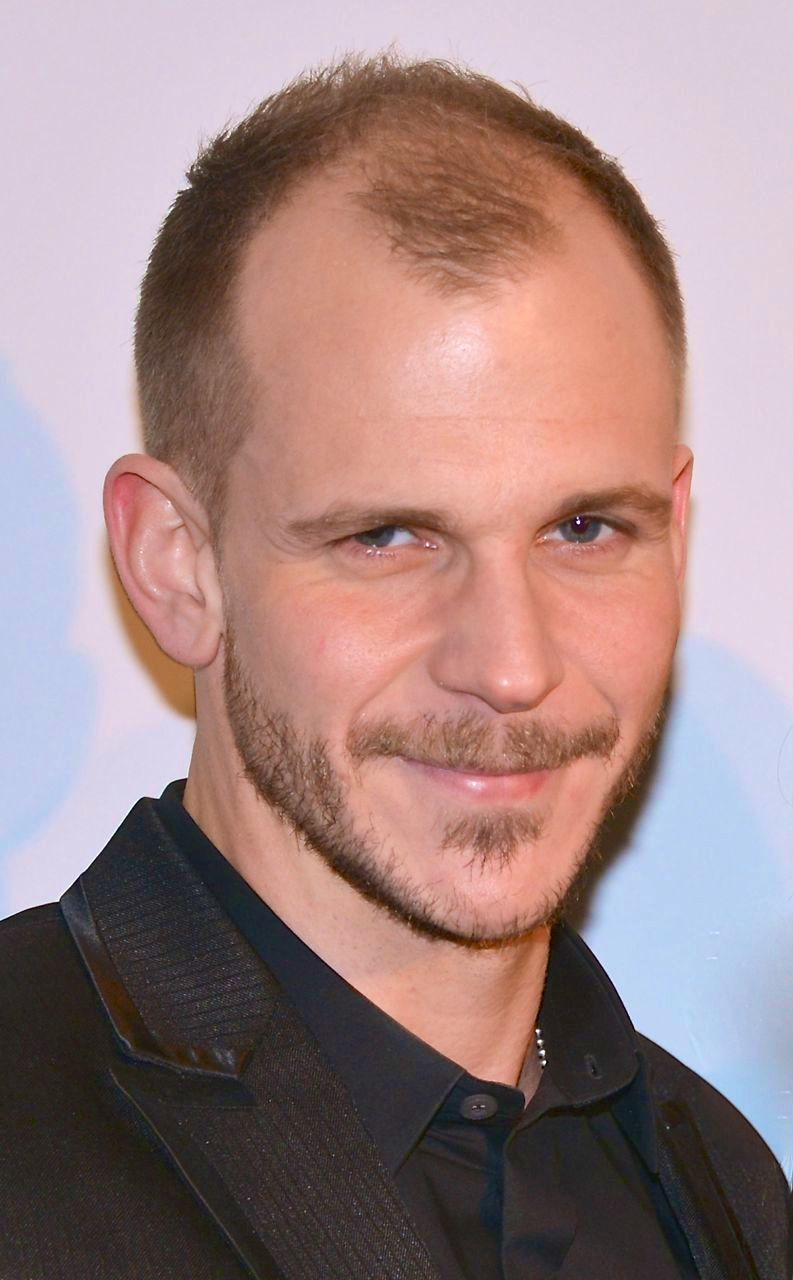
Gustaf Skarsgård, Best Actor winner

Best Film: Kidz in da Hood – Peter Holthausen and Pontus Sjöman; Falkenberg Farewell – Anna Anthony; Storm – Karl Fredrik Ulfung	Best Director: Ylva Gustavsson and Catti Edfeldt – Kidz in da Hood; Jesper Ganslandt – Falkenberg Farewell; Anders Nilsson – When Darkness Falls
Best Actress in a leading role: Haddy Jallow – Säg att du älskar mig; Oldoz Javidi – When Darkness Falls; Amanda Ooms – Search	Best Actor in a leading role: Gustaf Skarsgård – Kidz in da Hood; Jonas Karlsson – Offside; Anastasios Soulis – Suddenly
Best Supporting Actress: Lia Boysen – Search; Lena Endre – Göta kanal 2 – Kanalkampen; Lena Nyman – White Trash	Best Supporting Actor: Anders Ahlbom-Rosendahl – The Secret; Peter Engman – When Darkness Falls; David Johnson – Falkenberg Farewell
Best Screenplay: Ylva Gustavsson and Hans Renhäll – Kidz in da Hood; Jesper Ganslandt and Fredrik Wenzel – Falkenberg Farewell; Anders Nilsson – When Darkness Falls	Best Cinematography: Linus Sandgren – Storm; Crille Forsberg – God Willing; Peter Gerdehag – The Horseman
Best Documentary Feature: The Substitute – Åsa Blanck and Johan Palmgren; Alice and Me – Rebecka Rasmusson; I Remember Håkan Alexandersson – Carl Johan De Geer	Best Shortfilm: Never Like the First Time! – Jonas Odell; Mannen som inte kom någonstans – Peter Larsson; Radicalized – Klara Swantesson
Best Achievement: Fabian Torsson, for the music in Kidz in da Hood; Marina Krig, for the production design in Tusenbröder - Återkomsten	Best Foreign Film: (Germany) The Lives of Others – Florian Henckel von Donnersmarck; (Spain) Volver – Pedro Almodóvar; (United States) (Mexico) (France) Babel – Alejandro González Iñárritu
Gullspiran: Catti Edfeldt, for her contributions to Swedish children and youth films.	Honorary Award: Nils-Petter Sundgren, film critic
Cinema Audience Award: Suddenly; Offside; Storm	The Ingmar Bergman Award: Angela Kovács, actress

== See also ==
- 79th Academy Awards
- 64th Golden Globe Awards
- 60th British Academy Film Awards
- 13th Screen Actors Guild Awards
- 12th Critics' Choice Awards
- 27th Golden Raspberry Awards
