= När mörkret faller =

När mörkret faller (Swedish: When darkness falls) may refer to:

- When Darkness Falls (1960 film), Swedish film
- When Darkness Falls (2006 film), Swedish film

== See also ==
- When Darkness Falls (disambiguation)
