= Snapphanar (miniseries) =

2006 Swedish miniseries

- Directed by: Måns Mårlind; Björn Stein
- Starring: André Sjöberg; Tuva Novotny; Anders Ekborg
- Country of origin: Sweden
- No. of episodes: 3

Original release
- Network: Sveriges Television
- Release: 2006

Snapphanar is a Swedish miniseries directed by Måns Mårlind and Björn Stein that aired in three parts on Sveriges Television during Christmas 2006. It is a historical drama about the Snapphane peasant rebel movement that fought against the Swedish rule of Scania in the 17th century. The "Snapphanar" fought secretly for Denmark during the late 17th century. The main character, Nils Geting, was played by André Sjöberg.

The miniseries was criticised by historians due to a perceived lack of historical accuracy. The Scanian nationalist attitudes portrayed in the series did not exist in the 17th century and the term snapphane - used for self-identification in the series - was in fact a derogatory term used by Swedes.

== Cast ==
- André Sjöberg - Nils Geting
- Tuva Novotny - Hedvig Sparre
- Anders Ekborg - Gabriel Lejonhufvud (Leonsson)
- Gustaf Skarsgård - Karl XI (Charles XI of Sweden)
- Malin Morgan - Svart-Stina (Black Stina)
- Peter Andersson - Överste (colonel) Dahlbergh
- Kim Bodnia - Mogens Laumann
- Jörgen Persson - Räddstor
- Samuel Hellström - Joshua Swartz
- Adam Lundgren - David Swartz
- Dag Malmberg - Anders Sparre
- Harald Leander - Olof Getting
- Jonas Karlström - Jakob Getting
- Niklas Engdahl - Scarred man
- Jonas Sjöqvist - Rosencrantz
