= Henrik Norlén =

Swedish actor (born 1970)

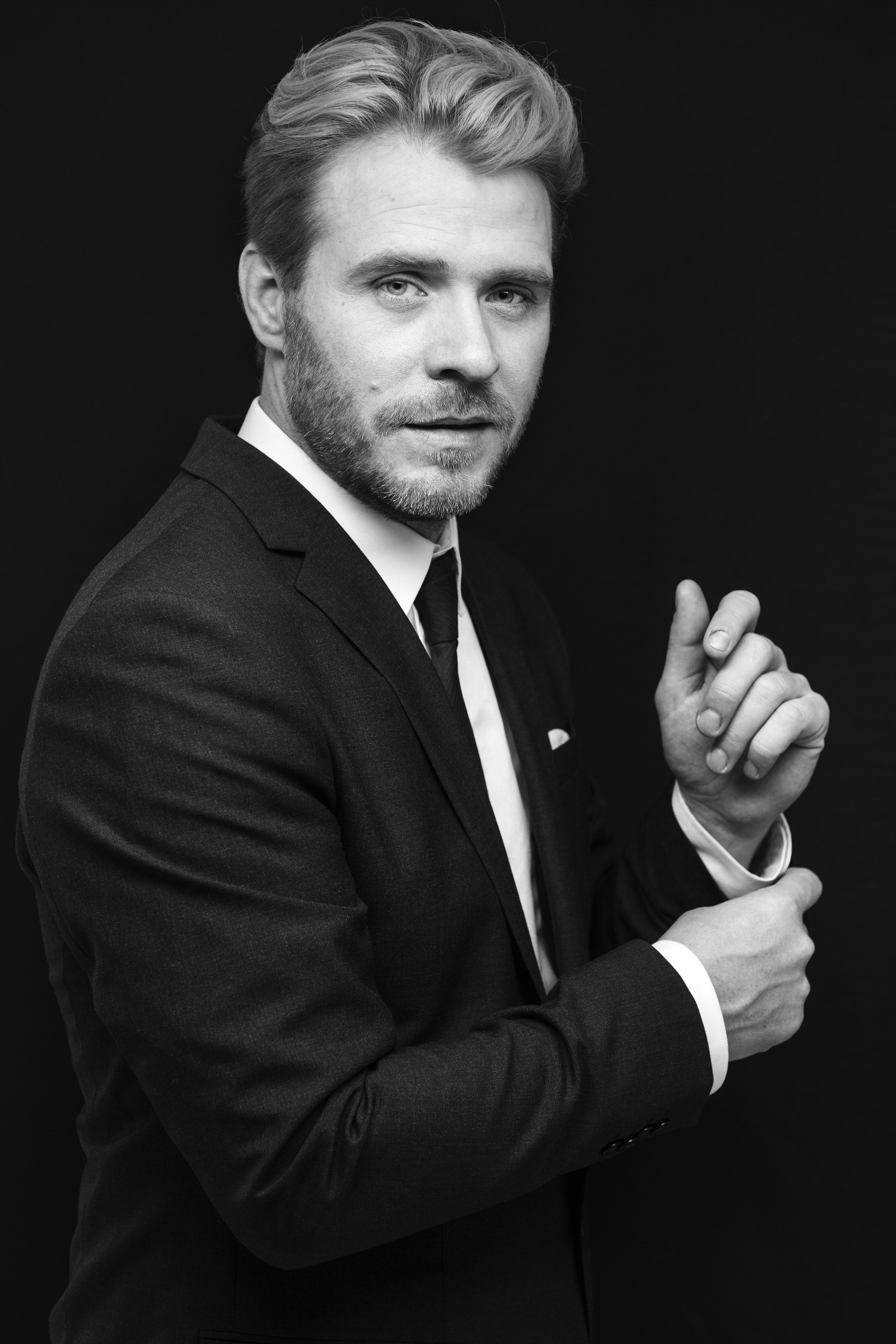
- Norlen in 2001
- Born: 2 September 1970 (age 55); Karlstad, Sweden
- Occupation: Actor
- Years active: 1996–present

Henrik Norlén (born 2 September 1970) is a Swedish actor.

== Selected filmography ==
=== Film ===
List of film appearances, with year, title, and role shown
| Year | Title | Role | Notes |
|---|---|---|---|
| 2006 | Exit | Åke | |
| 2010 | She's Crushed | Ray | |
| 2011 | Stockholm East | Anders | |
| 2011 | Beyond the Border | Wicksell | |
| 2012 | Once Upon a Time in Phuket | Johan Påhlman | |
| 2013 | Hotell | Peter | |
| 2013 | The Reunion | Henrik | |
| 2015 | My Skinny Sister | Lasse | |
| 2019 | Midsommar | Ulf | |
| 2020 | The Evil Next Door | Peter Lindvall | |
| 2022 | Dogborn | Yann | |

=== Television ===
List of television appearances, with year, title, and role shown
| Year | Title | Role | Notes |
|---|---|---|---|
| 2002–04 | Skeppsholmen | Johan Eldh | 52 episodes |
| 2009 | Morden | David Lundström | 4 episodes |
| 2013 | En pilgrims död | Lewin | 4 episodes |
| 2014 | Thicker Than Water | Bjarne | 10 episodes |
| 2015–17 | Modus | Ingvar Nyman | 16 episodes |
| 2016–17 | Syrror | Max Hansen | 12 episodes |
| 2017–18 | Sommaren med släkten | Richard / Rikard | 3 episodes |
| 2018 | Sisters 1968 | Rune | 3 episodes |
| 2021 | The Unlikely Murderer | Torsten Bergman | 3 episodes |
| 2024 | Deliver Me | Teo | |
