= Jonas Karlström =

Swedish actor

Jonas Karlström (born 3 October 1978) is a Swedish actor.

== About ==
Jonas Karlström was born in Karlskrona in Blekinge and studied acting at Fridhem's People's University in Svalöv. Living in Malmö he is a freelancing and freewheeling actor currently on a tour with a children’s play in his home county of Blekinge, a play he wrote himself. He has taken part in several theatre plays and independent films, such as The Island (not the Michael Bay film), Dödssyndaren and Shit the same. In 2006 he played one of the leads in Frostbite, the first Swedish vampire film of all time. He also played a part in Måns Mårlind's Snapphanar. In 2011 he appeared in the war film Beyond the Border.

== Filmography ==
- 2006 - Frostbite
- 2006 - Snapphanar
- 2007 - Predikanten
- 2007 - Stenhuggaren
- 2007 - Olycksfågeln
- 2011 - Beyond the Border
- 2011 - Irene Huss - Den som vakar i mörkret
- 2022 – The Machinery (TV series)
