= Shed No Tears =

Shed No Tears refers to:

- Shed No Tears (1948 film), American film
- Shed No Tears (2013 film), Swedish film
