= Linus Sandgren =

Swedish cinematographer

- Born: Spånga, Sweden
- Occupation: Cinematographer
- Years active: 2000–present
- Organization(s): Swedish Society of Cinematographers; American Society of Cinematographers
- Website: www.linussandgren.com

Linus Sandgren FSF, ASC is a Swedish cinematographer.

== Career ==
Sandgren is known for his use of unique and unconventional formats, shooting Promised Land in 4-perf Super 35mm 1.3x anamorphic for a 1.85:1 aspect ratio, and First Man on a variety of different formats.

For his work on La La Land (2016), which he shot in the classic Cinemascope ratio of 2.55:1, he won the Academy Award, BAFTA, Critics Choice and other awards for his cinematography. He is additionally the recipient of a Guldbagge Award, Sweden's highest film honor.

Sandgren is a member of both the American and Swedish Society of Cinematographers.

== Filmography ==
=== Feature film ===
Year	Title	Director	Notes
2005	Storm	Måns Mårlind; Björn Stein	
2010	Shelter	Måns Mårlind; Björn Stein	
2012	Promised Land	Gus Van Sant	
2013	American Hustle	David O. Russell	
2014	The Hundred-Foot Journey	Lasse Hallström	
2015	Joy	David O. Russell	
2016	La La Land	Damien Chazelle	
2017	Battle of the Sexes	Jonathan Dayton; Valerie Faris	
2018	First Man	Damien Chazelle	
2018	The Nutcracker and the Four Realms	Lasse Hallström; Joe Johnston	
2021	No Time to Die	Cary Joji Fukunaga	
2021	Don't Look Up	Adam McKay	
2022	Babylon	Damien Chazelle	
2023	Saltburn	Emerald Fennell	
2025	Jay Kelly	Noah Baumbach	
2026	Wuthering Heights	Emerald Fennell	
2026	Dune: Part Three †	Denis Villeneuve	Post-production

=== Television ===
Year	Title	Director	Notes
2002	Överallt och ingenstans	Kajsa Eldin; Kristina Kjellin	TV movie
2002	Spung	Måns Mårlind	4 episodes
2003	Rätt i rutan	Carl Svensson	7 episodes
2004	Kommissarie Winter	Eddie Thomas Petersen	Episode: "Himlen är en plats på jorden - Del 1"
2006	Snapphanar	Måns Mårlind; Björn Stein	Miniseries

== Awards and nominations ==
=== Major awards ===
Year	Award	Category	Title	Result
2016	Academy Awards	Best Cinematography	La La Land	Won
2016	BAFTA Awards	Best Cinematography	La La Land	Won
2018	BAFTA Awards	Best Cinematography	First Man	Nominated
2021	BAFTA Awards	Best Cinematography	No Time to Die	Nominated
2016	American Society of Cinematographers	Outstanding Achievement in Cinematography	La La Land	Nominated
2018	American Society of Cinematographers	Outstanding Achievement in Cinematography	First Man	Nominated

=== Miscellaneous awards ===
Year	Award	Category	Title	Result
2016	Critics' Choice Movie Awards	Best Cinematography	La La Land	Won
2018	Critics' Choice Movie Awards	Best Cinematography	First Man	Nominated
2023	Critics' Choice Movie Awards	Best Cinematography	Saltburn	Nominated
2020	Royal Photographic Society	Lumière Award		Won
2016	Washington D.C. Area Film Critics Association	Best Cinematography	La La Land	Won
2018	Washington D.C. Area Film Critics Association	Best Cinematography	First Man	Nominated
2016	San Francisco Bay Area Film Critics Circle	Best Cinematography	La La Land	Nominated
2018	San Francisco Bay Area Film Critics Circle	Best Cinematography	First Man	Nominated
2016	Alliance of Women Film Journalists	Best Cinematography	La La Land	Nominated
2018	Alliance of Women Film Journalists	Best Cinematography	First Man	Nominated
2016	Chicago Film Critics Association	Best Cinematography	La La Land	Won
2018	Chicago Film Critics Association	Best Cinematography	First Man	Nominated

=== Other awards ===
Year	Award	Category	Title	Result
2016	Dallas–Fort Worth Film Critics Association	Best Cinematography	La La Land	Won
2016	Satellite Awards	Best Cinematography	La La Land	Nominated
2016	St. Louis Gateway Film Critics Association	Best Cinematography	La La Land	Won
2016	Florida Film Critics Circle	Best Cinematography	La La Land	Won
2016	Online Film Critics Society	Best Cinematography	La La Land	Won
2016	Los Angeles Film Critics Association	Best Cinematography	La La Land	2nd place
2016	San Diego Film Critics Society	Best Cinematography	La La Land	2nd place
2016	National Society of Film Critics	Best Cinematography	La La Land	2nd place
2016	Indiewire Critics Poll	Best Cinematography	La La Land	2nd place
2016	Atlanta Film Critics Society Awards	Best Cinematography	La La Land	Won
2016	Phoenix Film Critics Society	Best Cinematography	La La Land	Won
2016	Las Vegas Film Critics Society	Best Cinematography	La La Land	Won
2016	Southeastern Film Critics Association	Best Cinematography	La La Land	Won
2016	Utah Film Critics Association	Best Cinematography	La La Land	Won
2016	Nevada Film Critics Association Award	Best Cinematography	La La Land	Won
2016	Austin Film Critics Association Awards	Best Cinematography	La La Land	Won
2016	North Texas Film Critics Association	Best Cinematography	La La Land	Won
2016	North Carolina Film Critics Association	Best Cinematography	La La Land	Won
2016	Houston Film Critics Society	Best Cinematography	La La Land	Won
2016	Central Ohio Film Critics Association	Best Cinematography	La La Land	Won
2016	Hawaii Film Critics Society	Best Cinematography	La La Land	Won
2016	Seattle Film Critics Association	Best Cinematography	La La Land	Nominated
2018	Dublin Film Critics Circle	Best Cinematography	First Man	Won
2018	Los Angeles Online Film Critics Society	Best Cinematography	First Man	Nominated
2018	St. Louis Film Critics Circle Awards	Best Cinematography	First Man	Nominated
2018	North Texas Film Critics Association	Best Cinematography	First Man	2nd place
