= Monica Z - Musiken från filmen =

Soundtrack album by Edda Magnason
- Released: 2013
- Genre: Jazz
- Length: 45:03
- Label: Universal Music Group
- Producer: Peter Nordahl

Monica Z – Musiken från filmen is a soundtrack-album from the film Waltz for Monica with vocals by Edda Magnason, directed, produced and arranged by Peter Nordahl. It was recorded at the Atlantis Studios, Stockholm and Nilento Studio, Gothenburg. It was issued by Universal Music Group in 2013.

== Track listing ==
1. "Sakta vi gå genom stan" – 3:20
2. "Hit the Road Jack" – 2:05
3. "Monicas vals" – 3:09
4. "O vad en liten gumma kan gno" – 2:22
5. "En gång i Stockholm" – 3:13
6. "It Could Happen to You" – 1:44
7. "Gröna små äpplen" – 5:16
8. "Trubbel" – 5:17
9. "Du" – 2:20
10. "Bedårande sommarvals" – 2:57
11. "I Can't Give You Anything But Love" – 1:40
12. "I New York" – 2:19
13. "Monica Z – Svit ur filmen" – 9:13

== Chart positions ==
Chart (2013–2014)	Peak position
Denmark	8
Finland	6
Sweden	3
