= Hotell =

2013 film

- Film poster
- Directed by: Lisa Langseth
- Written by: Lisa Langseth
- Produced by: Patrik Andersson
- Starring: Alicia Vikander
- Cinematography: Simon Pramsten
- Edited by: Elin Pröjts
- Music by: Johan Berthling; Andreas Söderström
- Distributed by: B-Reel Films
- Release dates: 6 September 2013 (TIFF); 4 October 2013 (Sweden)
- Running time: 99 minutes
- Country: Sweden
- Language: Swedish

Hotell is a 2013 Swedish drama film written and directed by Lisa Langseth. It was screened in the Contemporary World Cinema section at the 2013 Toronto International Film Festival.

The film received four nominations at the 49th Guldbagge Awards.

== Plot ==
Erika joins a group therapy session after her baby is born with brain damage. The group decides to travel to a series of hotels where they can wake up each day and, as a coping mechanism, be different people.

== Cast ==
- Alicia Vikander as Erika
- David Dencik as Rikard
- Simon J. Berger as Oskar
- Henrik Norlén as Peter
- Philip Martin as Joel
- Mira Eklund as Ann-Sofie
- Anna Bjelkerud as Pernilla

== Accolades ==
Award / Film Festival	Category	Recipients and nominees	Result
Guldbagge Awards	Best Screenplay	Lisa Langseth	Nominated
Guldbagge Awards	Best Supporting Actress	Anna Bjelkerud	Won
Guldbagge Awards	Best Supporting Actress	Mira Eklund	Nominated
Guldbagge Awards	Best Supporting Actor	David Dencik	Nominated
