= The Defeated =

2020 miniseries

- Also known as: Shadowplay
- Written by: Måns Mårlind

Production
- Production companies: Tandem Productions; Bron Studios

The Defeated, also known as Shadowplay, is a 2020 television series created and produced with international participation. Written by Swedish director Måns Mårlind and co-directed with Bjorn Stein, it stars the Canadian actor Taylor Kitsch, American Logan Marshall-Green, and German Nina Hoss.

It premiered on German TV in October and November 2020, and the next year in Australia and the United States (on Netflix).

== Plot ==
New York Police Department Detective Max McLaughlin gets assigned to post-World War II Berlin by the United States Department of State to help organize and establish a new police force, and help Elsie Garten, a novice female German police superintendent, to fight crime in 1946 Germany. He also plans to look for his brother, Moritz, a United States Army soldier who went AWOL at the end of the war.

== Production ==
The two lead characters, brothers Max and Moritz McLaughlin, are named by their ethnic German mother after German literary characters from a 19th-century illustrated children's book, Max and Moritz: A Story of Seven Boyish Pranks. The book is prominently featured throughout the series.

== Episodes ==
1. "First Trick". New York Police Department Detective Max McLaughlin is sent to Berlin in 1946 by the United States Department of State to help German police superintendent Elsie Garten establish a new police department after the nation's defeat in World War II. He also is trying to find his brother, Moritz, a United States Army soldier who is AWOL.
2. "Brother of Edmund". US Vice-consul Tom Franklin, Max's boss, puts pressure on him to investigate and solve the murder case of two American GIs as soon as possible.
3. "Rainbows". An auxiliary police officer has discovered where Karin is, but she flees to the "Angel Maker", a German crime boss and abortionist. Max does not find Moritz, but he finds his brother's sanctuary, learning that he has been holed up in a boathouse.
4. "Nakam". Moritz discovers crucial documents in the home of formerly high-ranking Nazi officer Otto Oberlander. Tom's wife Claire helps Max in his investigation. After Claire discovers that her husband is collaborating with the Nazis, Max and Moritz disagree about what should happen to Franklin.
5. "Bellyful". While Max and Elsie's unit locates Karin again and pursues a contentious line of questioning, the investigation in Berlin goes on.
6. "Blessed". Elsie and Max make progress in the investigation, but Karin and the Angel Maker continue to be one step ahead. Elsie takes dangerous action to defend her husband Leopold.
7. "Mutti". When Max discovers the truth about the secret flights, he issues an ultimatum to Moritz. Karin and the Angel Maker organize a fatal attack on Max and Elsie's police precinct.
8. "Homecoming". When Max and Elsie find out where the Angel Maker is, he has one last ruse up his sleeve. Moritz targets Tom Franklin, setting up a confrontation with Max.

== Cast ==
- Taylor Kitsch as Max McLaughlin, a New York Police Department Detective of partial German descent; he has come to occupied Germany to find his brother, Moritz, and help novice German police superintendent Elise Garten establish a new police force in post-World War II Berlin.
- Logan Marshall-Green as Moritz McLaughlin, Max's brother and a United States Army soldier who has become mentally unstable since World War II.
- Nina Hoss as Elsie Garten, a hot-headed novice German police superintendent.
- Sebastian Koch as Dr. Hermann Gladow, also known as the Engelmacher ("Angel Maker"), an abortionist and crime boss who runs a crime syndicate.
- Benjamin Sadler as Leopold Garten, Elsie's husband; he is imprisoned in a Russian gulag.
- Michael C. Hall as Tom Franklin, US Vice-consul
- Tuppence Middleton as Claire Franklin, Tom's wife and friend of Max.
- Mala Emde as Karin Mann, a woman raped by American soldiers. After enacting revenge, she is indebted to Gladow.
- Anne Ratte-Polle as Marianne, a member of Gladow's crime syndicate and something of a handler of Karin.
- Ivan G'Vera as Alexander Izosimov, a Soviet Army General detaining Leopold Garten, Elsie's husband.
- Maximilian Ehrenreich as Gad, a kind 16-year-old novice German police officer assisting Max and Elsie.

== Production and distribution ==
The series was written by Måns Mårlind, a Swedish screenwriter and director. It is produced by Tandem Productions and Bron Studios, German and Canadian companies, respectively. It premiered in Germany on ZDF in four film-length episodes in October and November 2020. In Australia, it was shown as Shadowplay in 2021 on free-to-air TV station SBS.

The Defeated was distributed on Netflix as a streaming series on 18 August 2021.

Production of The Defeated took place entirely in Prague and surrounding locations in the Czech Republic. These stood in for WWII-era Germany.

== Reception ==
The Daily Telegraph's Ed Power described the series as a "grimly gripping thriller" and rated it four out of five stars. The Sydney Morning Herald's Kylie Northover described the series as "gorgeous but graphic" and rated it three out of five stars.
