= Tuesday Afternoon (Jennifer Brown song) =

Single by Jennifer Brown

from the album Vera
- B-side: "Feel That Natural (Demo)"
- Released: 1998
- Genre: Pop; R&B; soul; swing
- Length: 4:09
- Label: RCA; BMG Sweden; Ricochet Records
- Songwriters: Jennifer Brown; Andy Marvel; Billy Mann
- Producers: Andy Marvel; Billy Mann

Jennifer Brown singles chronology
"In My Garden" (1997)	"Tuesday Afternoon" (1998)	"Alive" (1999)

Music video
- "Tuesday Afternoon" on YouTube

"Tuesday Afternoon" is a 1998 song recorded by Swedish singer Jennifer Brown, released in 1998 as the lead single from her third studio album, Vera (1999). She co-wrote it with American songwriters and producers Andy Marvel and Billy Mann. Lyrically, it tells the story of a young girl named Josie, who goes to a bar on a Tuesday afternoon. She meets a guy and they end up having unprotected sex in his apartment. The song was an international hit and afforded Brown her most widespread global success charting in Europe, Japan and the UK. It peaked at number 17 in Austria, number 27 in Sweden and number 32 in Iceland. Additionally, it reached the top 50 in France, top 60 in the UK and top 70 in Germany. On the Eurochart Hot 100, it peaked at number 88 in May 1999.

== Critical reception ==
Pan-European magazine Music & Media wrote, "This singer has done quite well in her native Sweden, and in Japan, and with this track which fuses folk with R&B and more left-of-centre sounds she could make inroads elsewhere, too. Co-produced and co-written by famed Philadelphia producer/songwriter Billy Mann, who has worked with Carole King and Chaka Khan to name but a few, this song could go a long way because it's suitable for a wide range of formats." They also stated, "If you haven't heard it yet, it's a great pop tune with lyrics which read like a short story set in smalltown America, complete with bar, rednecks and insecure heroine."

== Music video ==
A music video was produced to promote the single, depicting the story of Josie. Brown is seen performing in and outside of the bar. The video was published on Brown's official YouTube channel in October 2009.

== Track listing ==
CD single, Sweden
No.	Title	Length
1.	"Tuesday Afternoon"	4:09
2.	"Feel That Natural" (Demo)	3:33

CD maxi, Sweden
No.	Title	Length
1.	"Tuesday Afternoon"	4:09
2.	"Feel That Natural" (Demo)	3:33
3.	"Tuesday Afternoon" (Acoustic Version)	3:50

Cassette single, Europe
No.	Title	Length
1.	"Tuesday Afternoon"	4:07
2.	"Feel That Natural" (Demo)	3:33

== Charts ==
Weekly chart performance for "Tuesday Afternoon"
Chart (1998–1999)	Peak position
Austria (Ö3 Austria Top 40)	17
Belgium (Ultratip Bubbling Under Flanders)	12
Europe (Eurochart Hot 100)	88
France (SNEP)	46
Germany (GfK)	68
Iceland (Íslenski Listinn Topp 40)	32
Netherlands (Single Top 100)	80
Sweden (Sverigetopplistan)	27
UK Singles (OCC)	57

Annual chart rankings for "Tuesday Afternoon"
Chart (1999)	Rank
Europe Border Breakers (Music & Media)	16
