= André Sjöberg =

Swedish actor (born 1974)

- Born: Sweden
- Occupation: Actor

André Sjöberg (born 9 February 1974) is a Swedish actor who is best recognised for his part as Nils Geting in 2006 television miniseries Snapphanar. He also appeared as a mentally affected Tore in 2004 film Så som i himmelen (English title As It Is in Heaven) and 2005 film Nära huden (English title Close to the Skin) as Jojje. In 2011, he starred as Aron Stenström in Swedish war drama Beyond the Border ("Ur Gränsen" in Swedish).
