= The Evil Next Door =

2020 Swedish horror film

- UK film poster
- Swedish: Andra sidan
- Directed by: Oskar Mellander; Tord Danielsson
- Written by: Oskar Mellander; Tord Danielsson
- Produced by: Gila Bergqvist
- Starring: Jakob Fahlstedt; Janna Granström; Dilan Gwyn; Karin Holmberg
- Cinematography: Henrik Johansson
- Edited by: Joakim Tessert-Ekström
- Music by: Jonas Wikstrand
- Production company: Magnet
- Distributed by: Magnolia Pictures
- Release date: 23 October 2020
- Running time: 87 minutes
- Country: Sweden
- Language: Swedish
- Box office: $1.4 million

The Evil Next Door (Swedish: Andra sidan) is a 2020 Swedish mystery horror drama film written and directed by Oskar Mellander and Tord Danielsson in their feature film debut. The film premiered in Sweden on 23 October 2020.

== Plot ==
When Shirin moves into a new house with her new boyfriend Fredrik and his five-year-old son Lucas, it seems like a good idea to live together as a family. Lucas is still struggling with the recent death of his mother, and so Shirin is not surprised by his question about whether dead people can actually come back. However, when he talks about his new friend next door, she becomes suspicious, because the other half of the house has been empty for years! Little by little, she discovers that the house holds a terrible secret and that something evil is after Lucas...

== Cast ==
- Jakob Fahlstedt as Polis
- Janna Granström as Julia
- Dilan Gwyn as Shirin
- Karin Holmberg as Katja
- Troy James as Monster
- Eddie Eriksson Dominguez
- Henrik Norlén as Peter Lindvall
- Linus Wahlgren as Fredrik
- Niklas Jarneheim as Mäklare
- Sovi Rydén

== Release ==
The film premiered in Sweden on 23 October 2020. It had a limited theatrical release in North America and made its streaming debut on 25 June 2021. It was internationally released on 8 January 2021 by Magnet Releasing.

== Reception ==
=== Box office ===
The Evil Next Door grossed $1,010 in the United States and Canada, and a worldwide total of $1.4 million.

=== Critical response ===
On review aggregator website Rotten Tomatoes the film has a score of 29% based on reviews from seven critics, with an average rating of 5.9/10.

Jeanette White of Comic Book Resources wrote "While The Evil Next Door's Bogeyman lacks a proper origin story, its supernatural abilities and desire to consume children remain pretty standard horror genre fare". Joanna K. Neilson of Horror DNA gave the film 4 out of 5 stars and wrote "Personally, I'd love to survive yet another terrifying night with The Evil Next Door.
