= Goods (album) =

Woman Travels Alone

Studio album by Edda Magnason
- Released: 2011
- Genre: Pop
- Length: 37:00
- Label: Adrian
- Producer: Edda Magnason, Christoffer Lundquist

Edda Magnason chronology
Edda Magnason (2010)	Woman Travels Alone (2011)	Woman Travels Alone (2014)

Goods is Edda Magnason's second album. It was released in 2011 by Adrian Recordings.

It was co-produced by Christoffer Lundquist and recorded in his own studio, Aerosol Grey Machine Studios. Magnason wrote the music, sang and played piano and keyboards. The other musicians on the album are Tomas Ebrelius (violin, viola), Fredrik Myhr (drums), Martin Eriksson (double bass), Fredrik Stenberg (clarinet, bass clarinet) och Christoffer Lundquist (guitar, bass, percussion).

Magnason designed the cover and made all the illustrations in the CD booklet.

== Track listing ==
1. "Camera" – 3:38
2. "Blondie" – 3:57
3. "Beatle" – 3:43
4. "Magpie's nest" – 2:51
5. "Handsome" – 3:39
6. "Hur jag föreställer mig det är att segla (How I imagine sailing)" – 3:28
7. "Ancient star my innocent heart" – 3:42
8. "Falling asleep to a kitchen conversation" – 2:23
9. "Sound of arrivals" – 3:13
10. "One man show" – 3:15
11. "Jormine" – 3:11
