= When Darkness Falls =

When Darkness Falls may refer to:

- When Darkness Falls (novel), 2006 novel by Mercedes Lackey and James Mallory
- When Darkness Falls (1960 film), Swedish film
- When Darkness Falls (2006 film), Swedish film
- When Darkness Falls (2022 film), British film
- When Darkness Falls, song by Killswitch Engage, from the album The End of Heartache
