= Beyond the Border (2011 film) =

2011 Swedish war film

- Directed by: Richard Holm
- Written by: Johnny Steen; André Sjöberg
- Produced by: Johnny Steen; André Sjöberg
- Starring: André Sjöberg; Antti Reini; Bjørn Sundquist
- Music by: Anton Sten; Henrik Lindström
- Distributed by: Searock Films AB
- Release date: 28 January 2011
- Country: Sweden
- Languages: Swedish; German; Norwegian; Finnish

Beyond the Border (Swedish: Gränsen) is a 2011 Swedish war film directed by Richard Holm with André Sjöberg, Antti Reini and Bjørn Sundquist in the main roles.

== Plot ==
In 1942 in the Swedish province of Värmland bordering Nazi-occupied Norway, a group of Swedish soldiers leave their post at a check-point in neutral Sweden, and ends up on the wrong side of the border. One soldier is killed and another captured by the Germans, and a rescue operation is underway. However, a Swedish colonel sends out an execution squad to eliminate the lost soldiers and their rescuers, in order to cover up the mistake. The lost Swedish soldiers now suddenly face two different enemies on their way home across the border.

== Cast ==
- André Sjöberg as 1Lt. Aron Stenström
- Antti Reini as Cpl. Wille Järvinen
- Bjørn Sundquist as Egil
- Johan Hedenberg as Maj. Adolfsson
- Marie Robertson as Karin Lindström
- Martin Wallström as Pvt. Sven Stenström
- Rasmus Troedsson as Cpt. Keller
- Jens Hultén as Pvt. Hagman
- Henrik Norlén as Pvt. Wicksell
- Jonas Karlström as Pvt. Bergström
- Anders Nordahl as Axel Halvars
- Andreas Zetterberg as Pvt. Johansson
- Donald Högberg as Colonel Dunér
- Ingmar Robertson as Fu. Ekberg
- Susanne Thorson as Kaeja
- Jörgen Einar as Pvt. Olsson
- Robert Follin as Uno Larsson
- Jan Vilagos as German Groupleader
- Henrik Johansson as German Torturer
- Anton Damperud as Soldier
- Mathias Alstadsäter as Soldier
- Christer Broström as Soldier

== Awards and nominations ==
Association	Category	Nominee	Result
Guldbagge Award	Makeup and Hair	Anna-Lena Melin	Won
Guldbagge Award	Best visual effects	Johan Harnesk	Nominated

== See also ==
- Sweden during World War II
