= Woman Travels Alone =

Studio album by Edda Magnason
- Released: 26 November 2014
- Genre: Pop
- Length: 34:46
- Label: Parlophone
- Producer: Johan Lindström

Edda Magnason chronology
Goods (2011)	Woman Travels Alone (2014)

Woman Travels Alone is the third studio album by Swedish singer-songwriter Edda Magnason. released on 26 November 2014 by Parlophone.

== Track listing ==
1. "Hombre I Know" – 2:00
2. "Tell" – 1:53
3. "Game of Gain" – 3:29
4. "Great Simple Mind" – 2:09
5. "Lingering Girl" – 3:21
6. "Cocoamber" – 4:20
7. "Polar Bear" – 3:55
8. "Bloom" – 3:50
9. "Anchor" – 3:07
10. "Hurry Water" – 3:22
11. "Dare Devil" – 3:20
