= Exit (2006 film) =

2006 Swedish drama film

- Film poster
- Directed by: Peter Lindmark
- Starring: Mads Mikkelsen; Alexander Skarsgård
- Release dates: 26 September 2006 (Copenhagen); 6 October 2006
- Running time: 100 minutes
- Country: Sweden
- Language: Swedish

Exit is a 2006 Swedish drama film directed by Peter Lindmark. The film premiered at the 2006 Copenhagen International Film Festival.

== Cast ==
- Mads Mikkelsen as Thomas Skepphult
- Alexander Skarsgård as Fabian von Klerking
- Samuel Fröler as Morgan Nordenstråle
- Kirsti Torhaug as Anna Skepphult
- Börje Ahlstedt as Wilhelm Rahmberg
- Kristina Törnqvist as Louise Rahmberg
- Johan Rabaeus as Gabriel Mörk
- Maria Langhammer as Diana Malm
- Henrik Norlén as Åke
