= Mira Eklund =

Swedish actress (born 1981)

Mira Eklund (born 13 October 1981) is a Swedish actress. Her credits include Hotell, Sex hopp & kärlek and the television series Spung, Brandvägg and Love & Anarchy.

Eklund was nominated for 2013 Guldbagge Awards as best supporting actress for her role as Ann-Sofi in Hotell.

== See also ==
- Guldbagge Award for Best Actress in a Supporting Role
- 49th Guldbagge Awards
- List of Swedish actors
