= She's Crushed =

2010 American horror film

She's Crushed (or Crushed) is an American 2010 horror film directed by Patrick Johnson. It depicts the twisted games of love, torture, and death which lay in the hands of Tara, the disturbed intriguing girl next door.

The film was screened at the ShockerFest International Film Festival and The Spooky Film Festival. The film was released on DVD in the United States by Maverick Entertainment Group.

== Plot ==
Easygoing Ray just can not seem to catch a break from his micro-managing boss to his demanding girlfriend. After so much pressure and a little encouragement from a sweet Tara, he engages in a drunken one-night stand. When Tara decides she wants to keep Ray and he decides not to give her what she wants, she makes him pay with his loved ones' lives.

== Cast and characters ==
- Natalie Dickinson as Tara
- Henrik Norlén as Ray
- Robert Paschall Jr. as Phillip
- Hunter Carson as a crazy killer boyfriend
- Keith Malley as Ray's co-worker
- Caitlin Wehrle as Ray's girlfriend

== Reception ==
Dread Central said the film was "far from perfect, schlocky in many ways, I still had a good time watching this one and recommend seeking it out if you like this kind of fun, gory, psycho-stalker stuff."
