= Edda Magnason (album) =

Studio album by Edda Magnason
- Released: 20 January 2010
- Length: 41:32

Edda Magnason chronology
Edda Magnason (2010)	Goods (2011)

Edda Magnason is Swedish singer-songwriter Edda Magnason's debut album. The album was released on 20 January 2010 by Caprice Records.

It was recorded at Nybrokajen 11 in Stockholm, the oldest venue in Sweden for classical music concerts. Magnason wrote the music, played piano and sang. She produced the record together with Jonas André and made all the illustrations for the CD booklet.

The other musicians were Tomas Ebrelius (violin, glockenspiel), Martin Eriksson (double bass), Nils Berg (flute, clarinet), Jonas André (keyboard, bass guitar) och Emeli André (vocals).

== Track list ==
1. "Swirl" - 3:30
2. "Ropewalking" - 4:10
3. "Drömde jag var hund" - 1:54
4. "Ali" - 3:29
5. "Playbird" - 1:43
6. "Snow" - 3:45
7. "The blue hour" - 2:11
8. "Niece" - 2:55
9. "Patience" - 1:06
10. "Boats" - 6:37
11. "Sweet and sour" - 3:29
12. "Emmigrants" - 3:56
13. "Goodbye song" - 2:53
