= Swedish Society of Cinematographers =

Swedish Society of Cinematographers (Swedish: Föreningen Sveriges Filmfotografer) (FSF) is the country's educational, cultural, and professional cinematographers' organization and association. Neither a labor union nor a guild, FSF membership is by peer invitation only and is extended to directors of photography with distinguished credits in the film industry.

== History ==
The society was formed when visiting American cinematographer Lester Schorr suggested it was odd that Sweden didn't have a professional cinematographers society or organization. On his urgings the society was formed on 13 November 1961, modeled after the American Society of Cinematographers (ASC). The society started with 37 members and has subsequently grown.

It is a member of IMAGO, the European Federation of Cinematographers.

Olof Jonson is the current president.

== Members ==
Membership can only be achieved by recommendation by two other members.

FSF has had many Oscar-winning and awarded members in its ranks, including multiple Guldbagge Award-winners. Most notable are Sven Nykvist, ASC, FSF, Gunnar Fischer, FSF, Hoyte van Hoytema, ASC, FSF, NSC, Linus Sandgren, ASC, FSF, Jörgen Persson, FSF.
