= Anders Ekborg =

Swedish actor and singer (born 1960)

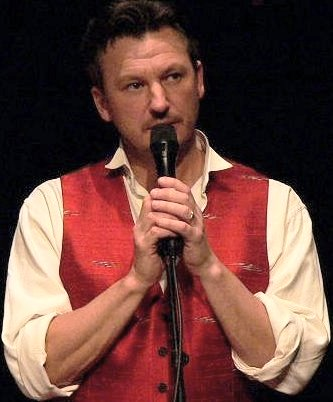
- Anders Ekborg in 2009.
- Born: Jon Anders Ekborg; 9 October 1960 (age 65); Stockholm, Sweden
- Occupations: Actor, singer
- Spouse: Lia Boysen (m. 1997–2012)
- Children: 2
- Parent(s): Lars Ekborg (father); Lola Sjölund (mother)
- Relatives: Dan Ekborg (brother); Maud Ekborg (sister)
- Website: www.andersekborg.nu

Jon Anders Ekborg (born 9 October 1960) is a Swedish actor and singer who has performed the roles of Karl Oskar in Kristina från Duvemåla and Freddie Trumper in Chess, two musicals that were written by former ABBA members Benny Andersson and Björn Ulvaeus. He has also acted in many Swedish-language versions of musicals, such as Jekyll and Hyde, Evita and Jesus Christ Superstar. He has been married to the actress Lia Boysen.

Ekborg also toured extensively throughout Sweden, mostly accompanied by Bengt Magnusson and Anders Lundqvist. He has released one album in his own name; Äkta Vara (2006). Additionally, he has appeared in numerous gala concerts including Rhapsody in Rock.

In 2007 he appeared in two huge arena shows; Queen – Another kind of magic and The Christmas Show. In 2008 he performed the role of Warrior in London – the Musical, and 14 July he took part in the birthday celebration of the Swedish Crown Princess Victoria.

In 2009 Ekborg did The Special Tour with Noel McCalla and Caroline Larsson. He also did a Christmas Tour on his own.

On 6 February 2010 Ekborg participated in Melodi Grand Prix; Melodifestivalen, in the 1st race in Örnsköldsvik, with the song "The Saviour", written by Tony Nilsson and Henrik Janson. The song was described as "magnificent but difficult to sing" and it was the first time Ekborg took part in the competition. The song finished in sixth place in the race, which was not sufficient to proceed.

== Selected discography ==
=== Albums ===
(Peak positions on Swedish Albums Chart)

- 1996: Kristina från Duvemåla: Den kompletta utgåvan – musical – (#2)
- 1999: Sexton favoriter ur Kristina från Duvemåla (#22)
- 2001: Evita
- 2002: Chess på Svenska – musical – (#2)
- 2006: Äkta vara (#27)
- 2010: Painted Dreams (#16)
- 2011: En stilla jul (#20)

=== Singles ===
- 2010: "The Saviour (Il Salvatore)"
- 2010: "I Do Believe"
- 2010: "Painted Dreams"

== Selected filmography ==
- 1993 – Murder at the Savoy
- 1993 – Drömkåken
- 1994 – Illusioner
- 1995 - The Secret of NiMH (Swedish voice)
- 1998 – The Last Contract
- 1999 – Dödsklockan
- 1999 – Tomten är far till alla barnen
- 1999 – Prinsen av Egypten
- 2001 – Syndare i sommarsol
- 2003 – Chess på svenska
- 2004 – Falla vackert
- 2004 – Drowning Ghost
- 2005 – Wallander – Byfånen
- 2006 – Den som viskar
- 2006 – Snapphanar
- 2009 – Kommissarien och havet
- 2013 – Crimes of Passion
