= X&Y (film) =

- Directed by: Anna Odell
- Starring: Anna Odell; Mikael Persbrandt
- Release dates: November 6, 2018 (Stockholm International Film Festival); November 23, 2018 (Theaters)
- Language: Swedish

X&Y is a 2018 Swedish drama film directed by Anna Odell. The film had a gala premiere at the Stockholm International Film Festival on 6 November 2018, and was released to theaters on 23 November.

At the 54th Guldbagge Awards, the film received two nominations: Best Actor in a Supporting Role (Jens Albinus) and Best Actress in a Supporting Role (Trine Dyrholm).
