= Jennifer Brown (singer) =

Swedish singer

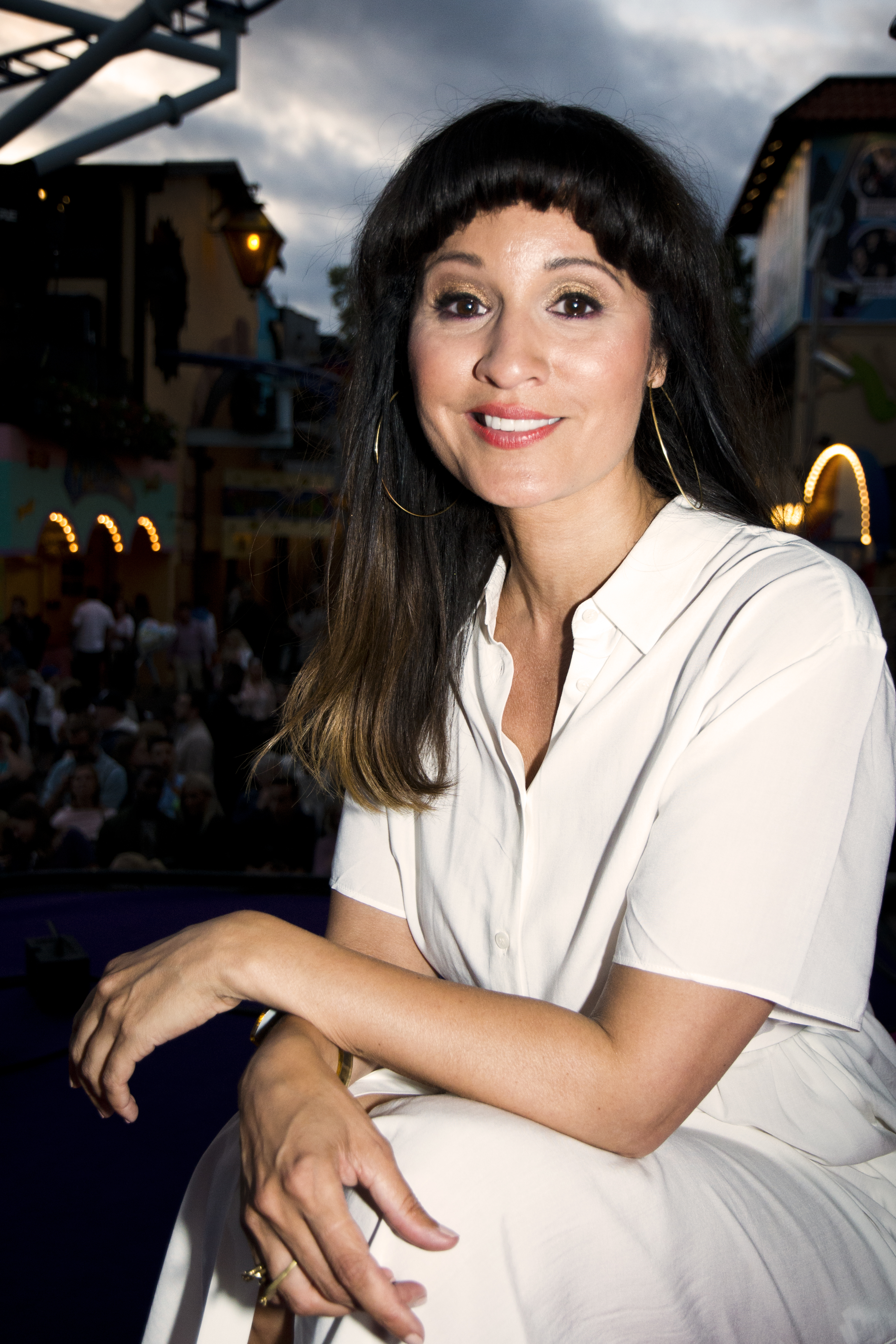

Background information
- Born: 18 February 1972 (age 54); Hjällbo, Gothenburg, Sweden
- Genres: R&B, pop
- Occupations: Singer, songwriter
- Instrument: Vocals
- Years active: 1990s-present

Jennifer Vera Brown (born 18 February 1972) is a Swedish singer. She was born in Hjällbo, northeast of Gothenburg, Sweden. She has recorded four albums and one EP.

== Life and career ==
Jennifer Brown was the daughter of a Trinidadian father and a Swedish mother with whom she and a brother and sister lived in the Gothenburg suburb of Hjällbo. At a young age Brown pursued her interest in performing – singing, dancing and acting – at a local recreation center and at age fifteen she studied at a music school in Hisingen subsequently performing as a member of the group Soul Miracle. In 1994 Brown relocated to Stockholm to pursue a musical career: after working at a bar she gained employment at the Swedish record label Telegram Records, her initial position as receptionist eventually leading to Brown's being signed to Telegram's recording roster.

Brown's 1994 album Giving You The Best peaked at no 1 in the Swedish charts and stayed in the chart for 22 weeks. Her two follow up albums did not sell as well as her debut album, with In My Garden (1997) peaking at no 9 and Vera (1998), peaking at no 8. She has recorded mainly as a solo artist, but also as part of the soul/jazz/pop crew, Blacknuss. Her 1998 single "Tuesday Afternoon", while not her biggest Swedish hit, afforded Brown her most widespread global success charting in Austria, Denmark, France, Germany, Japan, the Netherlands and the UK.

Outside Scandinavia her work is perhaps best known through the cover version of her song "Alive", by Paul van Dyk, which was renamed "We Are Alive" and became a hit across Europe in 2000.

Following the release of her fourth album Home in 2003 Brown largely retired from the music business. She played the adult female lead in the 2006 family film Förortsungar – Kidz in da Hood, then attempted a musical comeback via the 2009 edition of Melodifestivalen – the pre-selection round for the Swedish Eurovision entry – in which Brown participated with "Never Been Here Before", a ballad co-written by Brown with Peter Kvint and, according to Brown, inspired by her abandonment by her daughter's father when Brown was three months pregnant. One of eight acts competing in the Melodifestivalen 2009 semi-final of 14 February 2009, Brown was eliminated in the first of that semi-finals three heats. "Never Been Here Before" was one of five songs featured on Brown's November 2009 EP release Bloom in November.

On 20 September 2013 Brown made her theatrical debut in the musical Blood Brothers at the Stockholm City Theatre, playing the lead role of Mrs Johnson.

Brown has recently returned to recording with single releases recorded in Swedish: her 10 June 2016 single "In i himlen" was announced as the advance single from a forthcoming album.

== Personal life ==
After recording four albums she travelled to the United States and spent time in New York City and San Francisco, plus she traveled to India. She met the father of her daughter Lilly Lou (born 2007) while making the film Förortsungar – Kidz in da Hood in 2006: according to Brown the child's father abandoned Brown three months into her pregnancy. Brown has lived in an apartment in Stockholm's Old Town district since the mid-1990s.

== Musical style ==
In the beginning her music was modern soul and R&B, but later experimented with the acoustic singer-songwriter tradition and radio friendly pop. Her 2009 EP Bloom in November, was inspired by classic Motown sound.

== Discography ==
=== Albums ===
- Giving You the Best (1994) – SWE No. 1, AUS No. 67
- In My Garden (1997) – SWE No. 9
- Vera (1999) – SWE No. 8, AUT No. 31
- Home (2003) – SWE No. 43

=== Singles ===
- "To Be Where You Are" (1988)
- "Run From Me" – O.P Featuring Jennifer (1990)
- "Heaven Come Down" (1993) – SWE No. 21
- "Take a Piece of My Heart" (1994)
- "My Everything" (1994) – AUS No. 51
- "Lovin' Every Minute" (1994)
- "You Move Me" (1994)
- "It Should Have Been You" – Blacknuss Featuring Jennifer Brown, Titiyo (1995)
- "In My Garden" (1997)
- "When to Hold On" (1997) – SWE No. 13
- "Tuesday Afternoon" (1998) – SWE No. 27 AUT No. 17 DNK No. 12 DEU No. 68 FRA No. 46 NLD No. 80 UK No. 57
- "Alive" (1999) – SWE No. 34
- "Two in the Morning" (1999)
- "Paper Crown" (1999)
- "Weak" (2003) – SWE No. 44
- "Go Your Own Way" (2003)
- "Never Been Here Before" (2009)
- "Mr Running Man" (2009)
- "Bloom in November" (EP) (2009) – SWE No. 39
- "Kom Hem Till Mig" (2015)
- "Faller" (2015)
- "In I Himlen" (2016)
- "Break Open" (2022)
- "Vart Tar Dom Vägen" (2026)

== Film ==
- Kidz in da Hood
