= Nobody Owns Me =

- Directed by: Kjell-Åke Andersson
- Written by: Pia Gradvall
- Based on: Nobody Owns Me by Åsa Linderborg
- Produced by: Francy Suntinger
- Starring: Mikael Persbrandt; Tanja Lorentzon; Sten Ljunggren
- Production company: Filmlance International AB
- Distributed by: AB Svensk Filmindustri
- Release date: November 8, 2013
- Country: Sweden
- Language: Swedish

Nobody Owns Me (Swedish: Mig äger ingen) is a 2013 Swedish drama film directed by Kjell-Åke Andersson. The film is based on the novel of the same name by Åsa Linderborg, and stars Mikael Persbrandt, Tanja Lorentzon och Sten Ljunggren. Mikael Persbrandt was nominated and won in the category Best Actor in a Leading Role at the 49th Guldbagge Awards.

== Plot ==
The film depicts a lone father's (Mikael Persbrandt) relationship with his daughter after his wife (Tanja Lorentzon) leaves him. It is a story about alcoholism, child vulnerability, but also about love, betrayal and left-wing politics in 1970s Sweden.

== Cast ==
- Mikael Persbrandt as Hasse
- Tanja Lorentzon as Katja
- Ida Engvoll as Lisa, 25 years old
- Saga Samuelsson as Lisa, 11 years old
- Ping Mon Wallén as Lisa, 8 years old
- Sten Ljunggren as paternal Grandfather
- Barbro Oborg as paternal Grandmother
- Magnus Roosmann as Lennart
- Peter Carlberg as Roffe
- Anna Blomberg as Roffe's wife
- Linn Skåber as Sonja
- Anna Wallander as Görel
- Marie Delleskog as Teacher
- Eva Millberg as maternal Grandmother
- Nils Moritz as Julle
- Fernando Concha as Uncle Guido
- Kim Lantz as Man at the yard
- Roger Siik as Colleague at the steelworks

== Production ==
The film was shot between September 17 and November 12, 2012 in Trollhättan, Gothenburg, Piteå and Luleå, from a script by Pia Gradvall. It was produced by Francy Suntinger, the company Filmlance International AB, and premiered on November 8, 2013.
