= Anna Odell =

Swedish artist and film director (born 1973)

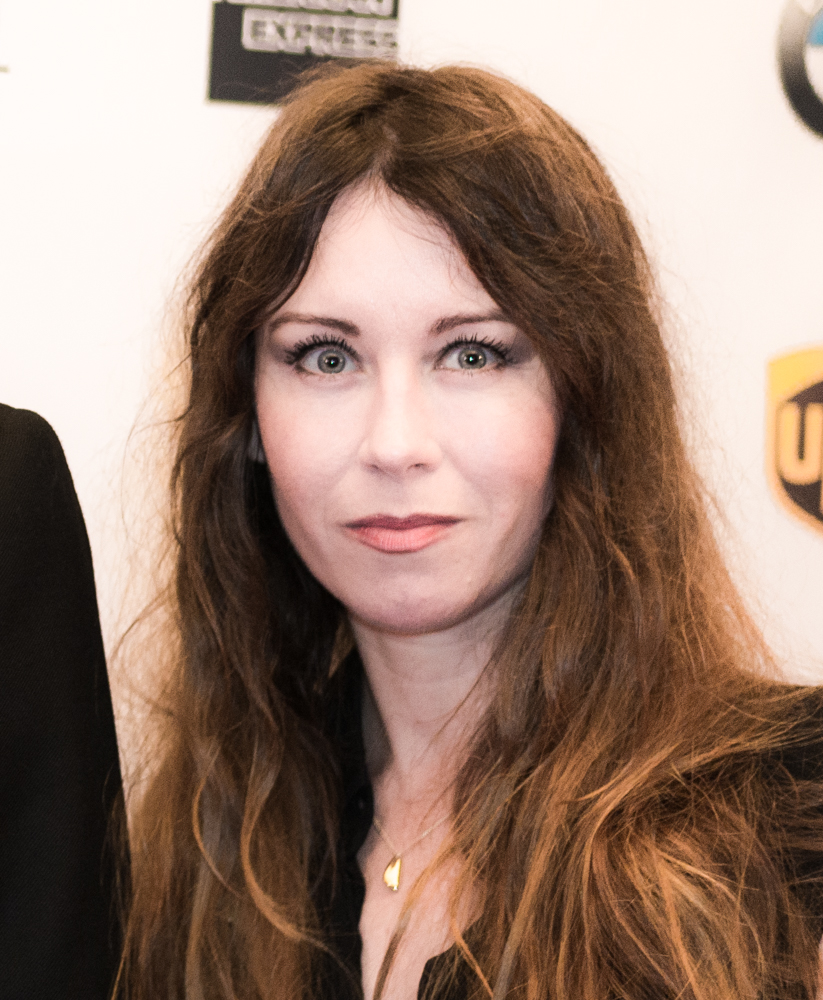
- Born: Anna Carolina Odell; 3 October 1973 (age 53); Stockholm, Sweden
- Education: Gerlesborg School of Fine Art; Konstfack; Royal Institute of Art
- Notable work: The Reunion
- Awards: Two Guldbaggen Awards

Anna Carolina Odell (born 3 October 1973) is a Swedish artist and film director. She won two Guldbaggen Awards for in 2014 for her film The Reunion in the categories Best Film and Best Screenplay. In 2009, her film Okänd, kvinna 2009-349701 received a lot of attention as it includes a faked suicide attempt on Liljeholmsbron in Stockholm. Both films have been nominated and presented at the Venice Biennale Film Festival. She is one of the groundbreaking artists in the emerging psycho-social art scene.

== Early life ==
Odell was born in Stockholm. She studied at the Gerlesborg School of Fine Art in Tanum Municipality, Konstfack and at the Royal Institute of Art in Stockholm.

== Career and controversy ==
The film Okänd, kvinna 2009-349701 (English: Unknown, woman 2009-349701) was Odell's examination work at Konstfack. The art film was part of Konstfack's exhibition for 2009 and was shown also the same year at Kalmars Konstmuseum. It was made to reconstruct Odell's own psychological breakdown in 1995, not as therapy but to test the power structures within the healthcare system and Swedish society's views on mental illness.

The recording of the art film led to controversy. On 21 January 2009, Odell staged a suicide attempt, psychological breakdown and psychosis on Liljeholmsbron in Stockholm. Police took her to a psychiatric ER at St Görans Hospital in Stockholm. The day afterwards, she revealed to the staff at the hospital that she had faked her mental illness for her film.

Odell's actions during the filming were criticized by David Eberhard, at the time head of the hospital. Odell was also criticized for using resources at the hospital that could have been used on people seeking help for genuine mental health conditions that same night. She was accused of violent resistance to police arrest, and for making a false alarm. The court found Odell guilty and imposed a 2500 SEK fine on her. The sentence was reduced because the courts thought she had no criminal intent in her actions. She did not appeal the sentence.

In 2013, Odell made her directorial debut with the film The Reunion. The film brings up the subjects of bullying, power structures in the society and unhealthy hierarchy in schools. Odell brought a lot of her own experiences from her own school time, and also the experiences from her school reunion. The film had its premiere at the Venice Film Festival that year. The film had its Swedish premiere on 15 November 2013 and received positive reviews. Återträffen won two Guldbagge Awards for Best Film and Best Screenplay.

In 2016, she made a voice role in the animated short film "Amalimbo" by Juan Pablo Libossart, the film was nominated in the short film category at the 2016 Venice Film Festival.

In 2018, Odell directed and played one of the leading roles in a film starring herself as a character, called X & Y, along with co-stars Mikael Persbrandt and Shanti Roney. The film was filmed in Trollhättan.

In 2024, Odell exhibited her solo exhibition – Rekonstruktion – Psyket – at Cecilia Hillströms Galleri revolving around her earlier days at a psychiatric hospital. The exhibition mainly consists of her video art piece by the same title as the exhibition but also includes photo work.

== Psycho-social art ==
Okänd, kvinna 2009-349701 has been seen as a ground-breaking example of psycho-social art in which a bisociative discourse is used to alter the art "space" and to resolve complicated notions normally associated with alternative prospects – let it be psychiatry, sexuality (for ex. 'Mattress Performance (Carry That Weight)'), theology (for ex. 'The World Is Cyclical'), comedy ('Borderline') et.c.

== Filmography ==
- 2009: Okänd, kvinna 2009-349701
- 2013: The Reunion
- 2018: X & Y
