= Josefin Neldén =

Swedish actress

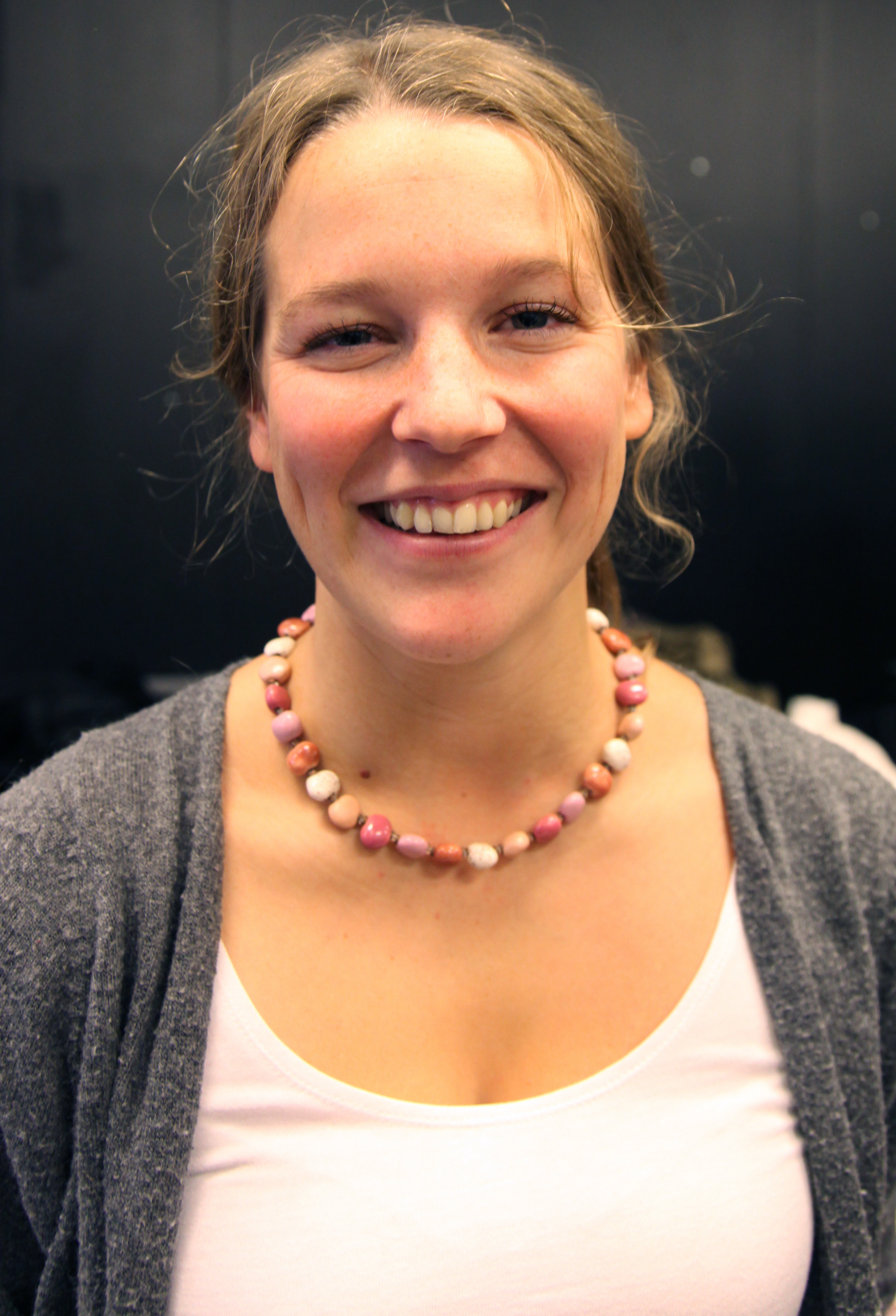
- Neldén in 2012.
- Born: 17 December 1984 (age 41); Gothenburg, Sweden
- Occupation: Actress

Kristina Josefin Neldén (born 17 December 1984) is a Swedish actress. She made her film debut in the 2005 film Tjenare kungen by director Ulf Malmros. She made her stage debut in the 2007 play En måste ju leva at Angereds Teater in Gothenburg. In 2014, she was nominated for a Guldbagge award for Best Supporting role as Lena in Shed No Tears. The film was based on the lyrics and music of singer Håkan Hellström.
