= On Suffocation =

- Directed by: Jenifer Malmqvist
- Produced by: China Åhlander
- Cinematography: Ita Zbroniec Zajt
- Edited by: Petra Ahlin; Jenifer Mamqvist
- Distributed by: ARTE
- Release date: 19 January 2013 (Sundance Film Festival)
- Running time: 7 minutes
- Country: Sweden

On Suffocation is a 2013 Swedish short film directed by Jenifer Malmqvist. The film was shown on the 2013 Sundance Film Festival and broadcast by ARTE on October 17, 2014. It won Best Short Film 2014 the Guldbagge Awards.

== Plot ==
In Iran, two young men are hanged for being homosexual, a sex crime.

== Reception ==
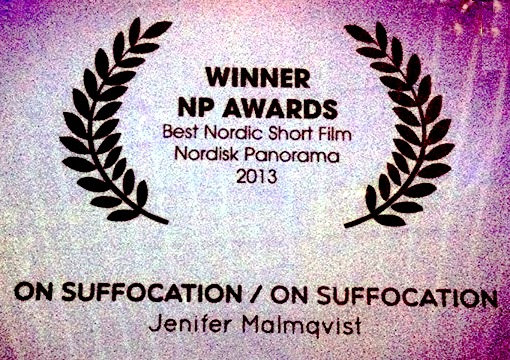
Winner NP Awards Best Nordic Short Film Nordisk Panorama 2013 On Suffocation Jenifer Malmqvist

Betsy Sharkey of the Los Angeles Times called it a "wordless triumph".

At the 2014 Guldbagge Awards, On Suffocation won Best Short Film.
