= Lia Boysen =

Swedish actress (born 1966)

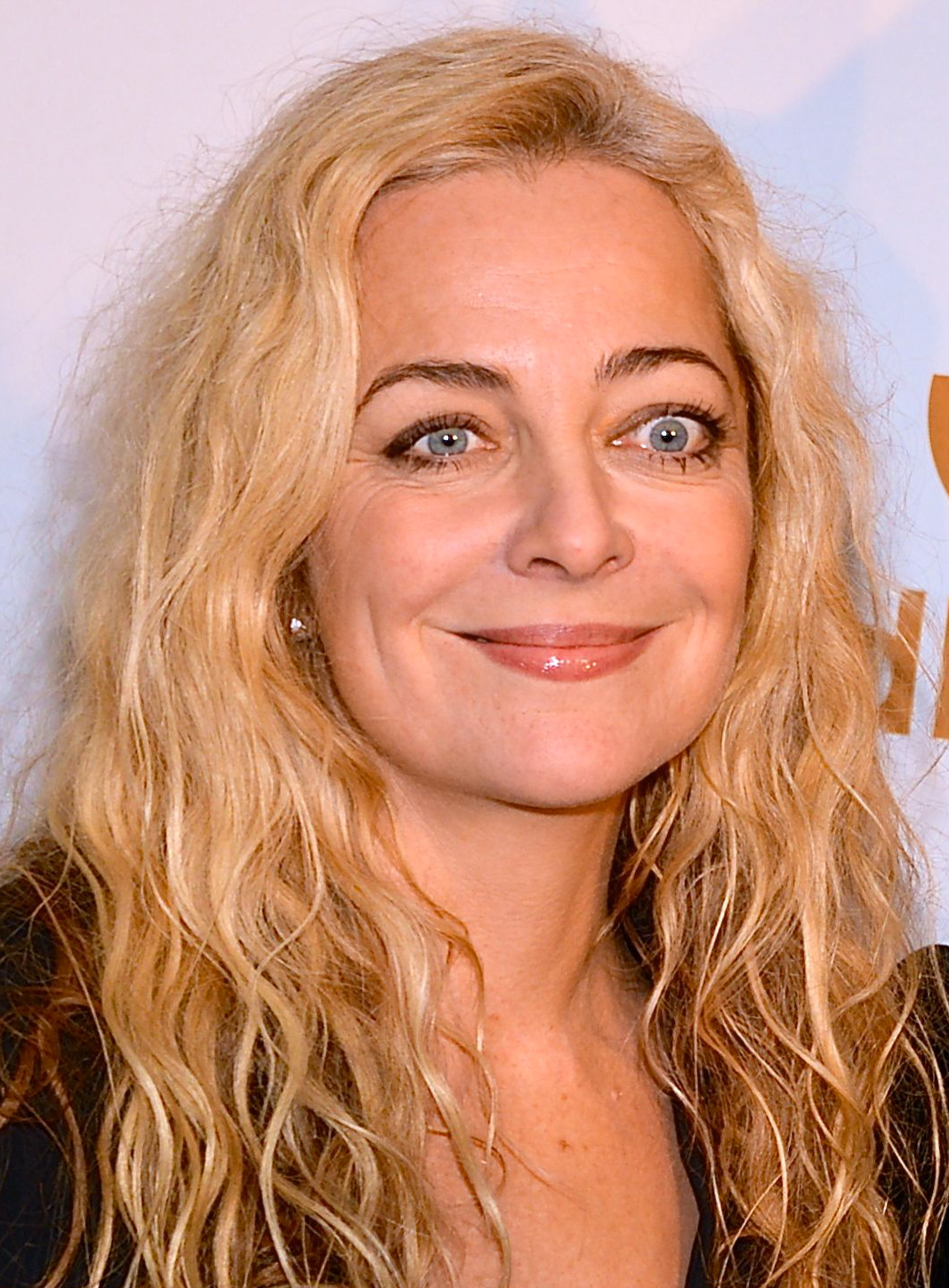
- Boysen in 2015
- Born: Lia Marika Boysen; 6 April 1966 (age 59); Stockholm, Sweden
- Occupation: Actress
- Years active: 1987–present
- Spouse: Anders Ekborg (m. 1997; div. 2012)
- Children: 2

Lia Marika Boysen (born 6 April 1966) is a Swedish actress. She was married to Anders Ekborg and they have two daughters. In 2006 she received a Guldbagge Award for her role in the film Sök. She has also narrated audiobooks, among them Bedragen (written by Katerina Janouch) and Asyl and Gömda (written by Liza Marklund).

== Selected filmography ==
- 1988 - Xerxes (TV)
- 1994 - Yrrol
- 2000 - The New Country (TV)
- 2001 - Executive Protection
- 2002 - Stora teatern (TV)
- 2003 - De drabbade (TV)
- 2004 - The Return of the Dancing Master (TV)
- 2004 - Falla vackert
- 2005 - Sandor slash Ida
- 2006 - Möbelhandlarens dotter (TV)
- 2006 - When Darkness Falls
- 2007 - Pyramiden
- 2008 - Les Grandes Personnes
- 2008 - Gud, lukt och henne
- 2009 - Olycksfågeln
- 2010 - Wallander – Dödsängeln
- 2015 - Returning Home
- 2016 - The Last King
- 2017 - Fallet
