= Storm (2005 film) =

- Storm movie poster featuring Eric Ericson
- Directed by: Måns Mårlind; Björn Stein
- Written by: Måns Mårlind
- Produced by: Karl Fredrik Ulfung
- Starring: Eric Ericson; Eva Röse; Jonas Karlsson
- Cinematography: Linus Sandgren
- Edited by: Björn Stein
- Music by: Calle Herlöfsson
- Release date: 18 November 2005 (Sweden)
- Running time: 116 minutes
- Country: Sweden
- Language: Swedish
- Box office: $1.83 million

Storm is a 2005 Swedish fantasy-thriller film directed by Måns Mårlind and Björn Stein. The film stars Eric Ericson, Eva Röse and Jonas Karlsson. The official opening of Storm was on 20 January 2006, but the actual opening was at a preview of the film on 18 November 2005 during the Stockholm Film Festival, where it also was awarded. Before 2006, Storm had already been sold to 18 other countries.

== Plot ==
Slacker Donny's (Eric Ericson) life is turned upside-down when Lova (Eva Rose) enters his life possessing a mysterious box which may hold answers to eternal and dangerous questions. But evil forces want to possess the box, and Donny and Lova must travel through time to ensure the future of mankind.

== Production ==
The film was shot in Stockholm, Vänersborg (as the abandoned city) and in Trollhättan, a.k.a. Trollywood.

== Reception ==
Steve Pattee from "horrortalk.com" blamed the film for having a "less than satisfactory" ending, but he gave three out of five stars. A blogger named Cyrus also spoke of a "less than satisfying ending" because there was possibly "a bit too much" left for the viewer to ponder. Bill Gribon from "dvdtalk.com" appreciated "Storm" as "fascinating food for thought".
