= Edda Magnason =

Swedish musician and actress

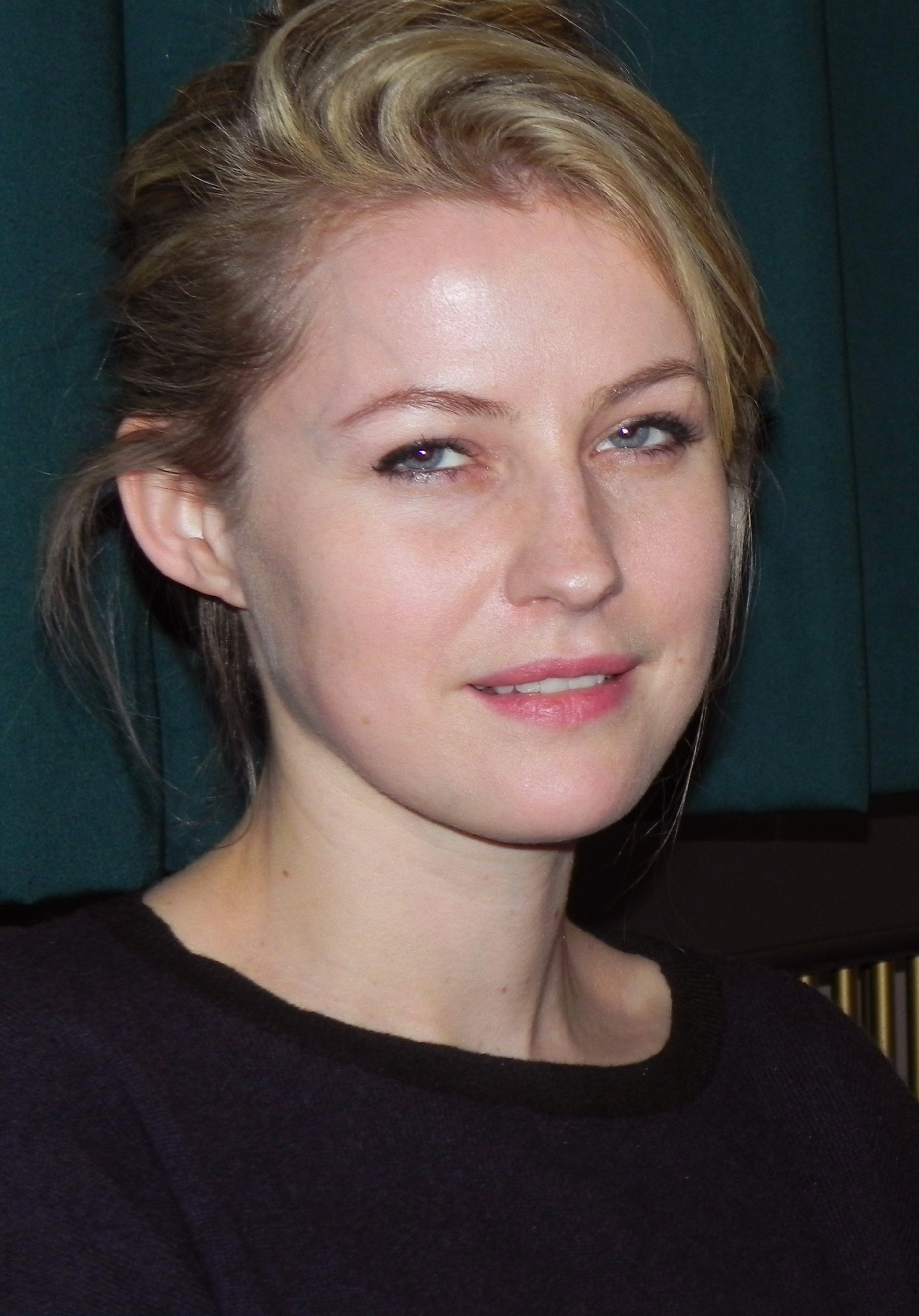
- Magnason in 2014

Background information
- Born: 22 August 1984 (age 42); Ystad, Sweden
- Genres: Pop; folk; classical; jazz
- Occupations: Pianist; singer-songwriter; composer; music producer; film actress
- Instruments: Piano; vocals; keyboards
- Labels: Parlophone; Adrian; Caprice

Edda Karin Hjartardóttir Magnason (born 22 August 1984) is a Swedish singer-songwriter, musician and actress. She has released three albums, Edda Magnason (2010), Goods (2011), and Woman Travels Alone (2014). She has also released a soundtrack album, Monica Z - Musiken från filmen (2013). She made her debut as an actress in the film Waltz for Monica, playing the leading role of Monica Zetterlund.

== Early life ==
Magnason grew up in Lövestad, a tiny village near Ystad, Sweden, but her father is, as her name suggests, from Iceland. One of seven children, she began composing her own pieces on the piano early on in childhood, dreaming of becoming a classical concert pianist.

When she was 16 she began writing electronic song-based pop music with English lyrics that she made into demo recordings. Some of these songs were used on the soundtrack of the 2002 Swedish film Hot Dog.

In 2004, she studied music composition in Gotland, then moved back to Malmö to take an active part in the music scene there.

She has developed a personal, eclectic music style which has been described as "a seamless blend of jazz, pop, folk song and classical music," with a vocal style reminiscent of Björk or Kate Bush.

== Music career ==
=== Solo albums ===
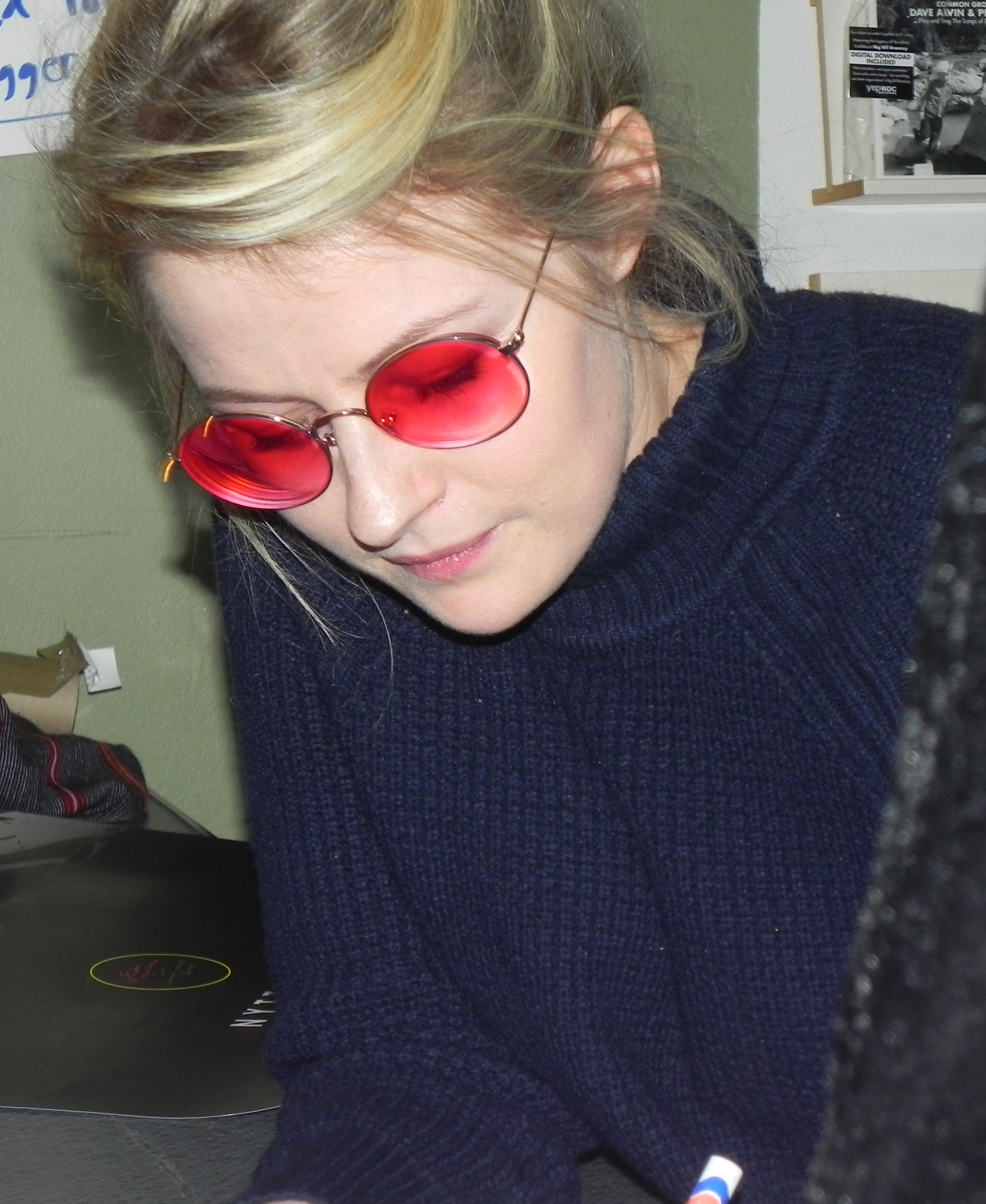
Magnason signing her latest album, Woman Travels Alone, 2014

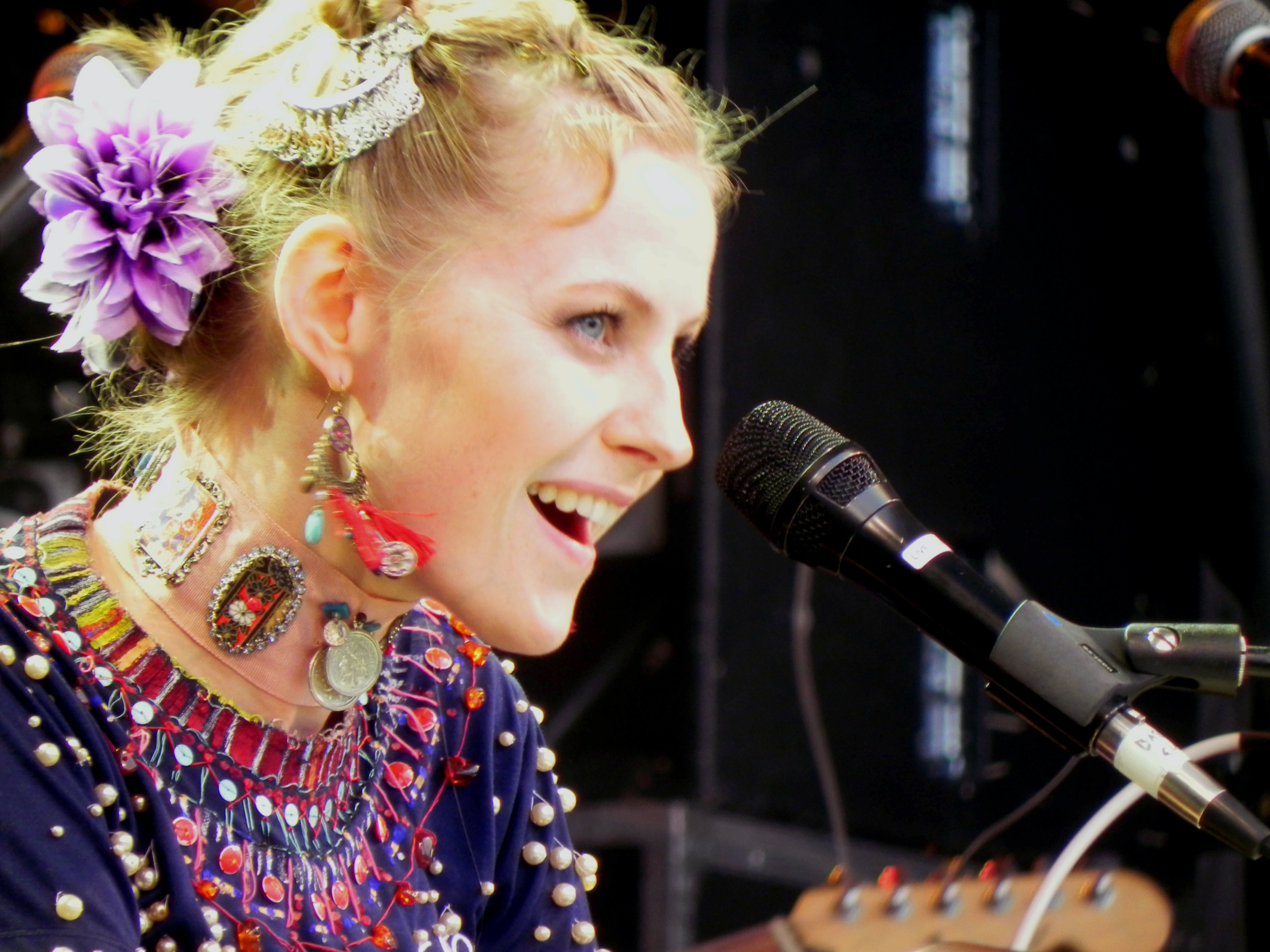
Magnason performing in 2011

She released her self-titled debut album, Edda Magnason in January 2010 on the Caprice Records label. Produced by Jonas André and Edda Magnason, it was recorded at Nybrokajen, a classical music venue in Stockholm, with piano and vocals by Magnason. She wrote all the music and made all the illustrations for the CD booklet.

Edda Magnason was one of the best albums of 2010 according to Ingrid Strömdahl, a music critic at the national Swedish newspaper Svenska Dagbladet:

"A stylish and quirky melting pot of jazz, folk, pop. Edda Magnason emerges as a musical personality of great stature, intuitive, intelligent and poetic. Lyrics, composition, vocals, piano playing, arrangement – everything is at a high artistic level".

Magnason released her second album, Goods, in March 2011, on the Adrian Recordings label. Produced by Christoffer Lundquist and Edda Magnason, it was recorded at Lundquist's own studio, the Aerosol Grey Machine studio (AGM) with Magnason on piano and keyboards. As well as writing, singing and performing all the music, Magnason designed the cover and made all the CD booklet illustrations herself. The second track, Blondie, was released as a single in May 2011, together with a surrealistic music video directed by Jens Jansson.

In 2013, Magnason signed contracts both with Warner Music and Sony/ATV Music Publishing, and in November 2014 they released her third album, Woman Travels Alone, which she produced together with Johan Lindström.

All three albums have received critical acclaim in Sweden.

=== Collaboration ===
Between 2005 and 2010, Edda Magnason collaborated with singer-songwriter, spoken word artist and film actor Emil Jensen, often taking part in his performances and recordings.

In February 2012, Naxos Records released Steve Reich: Electric Counterpoint, a compilation album by Mats Bergström and friends celebrating the influence of Steve Reich on contemporary music. Magnason performs her tribute to Steve Reich, a composition called "So Many Layers of Colours Become a Deep Purple Heart".

In May 2012, Adrian Recordings released Magnason's Jona, produced by Familjen, together with three remixes: a remix of Magnason's original version by Vidderna, a remix of Vidderna's version by Niva, and a remix of Niva's version by Justus Köhncke. This was inspired by the children's game Chinese whispers. A set of four music videos directed by Nisse Axman was also released.

== Film career ==
Magnason plays the leading role of Monica Zetterlund, the legendary Swedish jazz singer, in the film Waltz for Monica, which was released in September 2013. This was Magnason's first acting role, and she likens the experience to performing as a musician. The film follows Zetterlund's early career, moving from small-town Sweden to the jazz clubs of New York and Stockholm, rubbing shoulders with such celebrities as Ella Fitzgerald and Miles Davis. Directed by Per Fly, with a film script by Peter Birro, Sverrir Gudnason and Kjell Bergqvist played supporting roles.

The film was described in the Swedish media as an immediate critical and public success. It was seen by over 500,000 filmgoers in 2013, making it the year's most popular film in Sweden. It has been sold to 23 countries worldwide and numerous airlines. It was nominated for eleven Guldbagge Awards, and won four.

Magnason herself sings the full repertoire of Zetterlund's songs on the film soundtrack. A soundtrack album, Monica Z – Musiken från filmen, produced and arranged by Peter Nordahl, was released by Universal Music. Over 20,000 records were sold by December 2013, making this into a Swedish Gold album.

Magnason was signed by Paradigm Talent Agency, based in Beverly Hills, in February 2014.

== Musical theatre ==
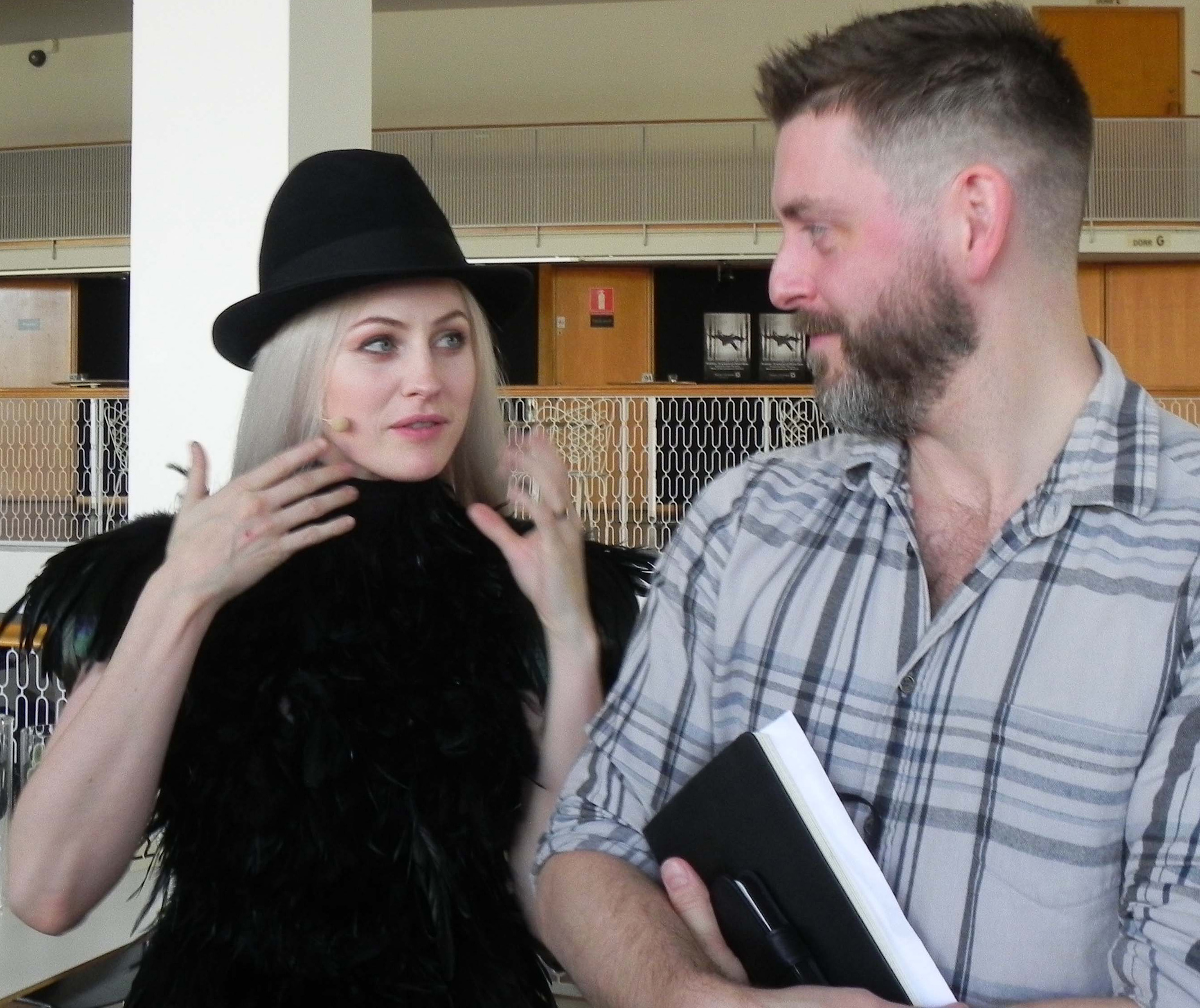
Magnason and Ben Wright, October 2013

In 2013, Magnason made her debut on the musical theatre stage, performing as a soloist with the choir and orchestra from Malmö Opera in The Feeling of Going, a dance and music production by Skånes Dansteater at Malmö Opera and Music Theatre. This is a visionary work by the British choreographer Ben Wright, based on the album Go by Jónsi, the Icelandic pop artist and lead singer in Sigur Rós.

== Awards and prizes ==
Magnason was awarded the Ystad Culture Prize in 2003, and was appointed as an ambassador for the Ystad Sweden Jazz Festival in 2013.

In 2013, Magnason received Spelmannen, a Swedish culture prize established by the evening newspaper Expressen, previously awarded to such artists as ABBA (1982), Anne Sofie von Otter (1997) and Georg Riedel (2003).

Magnason was nominated for a Grammis (jazz), the Swedish equivalent of a Grammy, for Monica Z – Musiken från filmen, the soundtrack album to the film Waltz for Monica.

She received a Guldbagge Award in the category Best Actress in a Leading Role from the Swedish Film Institute for her portrayal of Monica Zetterlund.

In December 2013, it was announced that she had been chosen as one of ten young European actors to win a Shooting Stars Award at the Berlin Film Festival in 2014. Selected from a short list of 24 nominating European member countries, the stars were presented to the world's media and influential film industry experts at the Berlin International Film Festival 2014.

== Discography ==
Albums

Year	Album	Peak positions
Year	Album	SWE
2010	Edda Magnason	–
2011	Goods	–
2014	Woman Travels Alone	27

Soundtrack album

Year	Album	Peak positions			Certification
Year	Album	SWE	DEN	FIN	Certification
2014	Monica Z – Soundtrack	3	8	50	

Compilation EP

- 2012: Jona

Others / joint albums

- 2012: Steve Reich: Electric Counterpoint (with Mats Bergstrom, Steve Reich, Magnus Persson, Johan Liljedahl, Svante Henryson, Jonas Ostholm & Edda Magnason) (compilation)

Singles

- 2011: "Handsome"
- 2011: "Blondie"
- 2013: "Sakta vi gå genom stan"
- 2015: "So Meny Layers of Colours Become a Deep Purple Heart"
- 2015: "Cocoamber (Neeco Delaf Remix)"
