= The Reunion (2013 film) =

2013 Swedish drama film

- English-language promotional poster
- Swedish: Återträffen
- Directed by: Anna Odell
- Written by: Anna Odell
- Starring: Sandra Andreis
- Cinematography: Ragna Jorming
- Release dates: 3 September 2013 (Venice); 15 November 2013 (Sweden)
- Running time: 88 minutes
- Country: Sweden
- Language: Swedish

The Reunion (Swedish: Återträffen) is a 2013 Swedish drama film directed by Anna Odell. The film won the Guldbagge Award for Best Film at the 49th Guldbagge Awards.

== Cast ==
- Anna Odell as Anna
- Sandra Andreis as Louise
- Kamila Benhamza as Camilla
- Anders Berg as Anders
- Jimmy Carlberg as Jimmy C
- Erik Ehn as Erik
- Niklas Engdahl as Nille
- Per Fenger-Krog as Per
- Robert Fransson as Robban
