= Måns Mårlind =

Swedish director and screenwriter (born 1969)

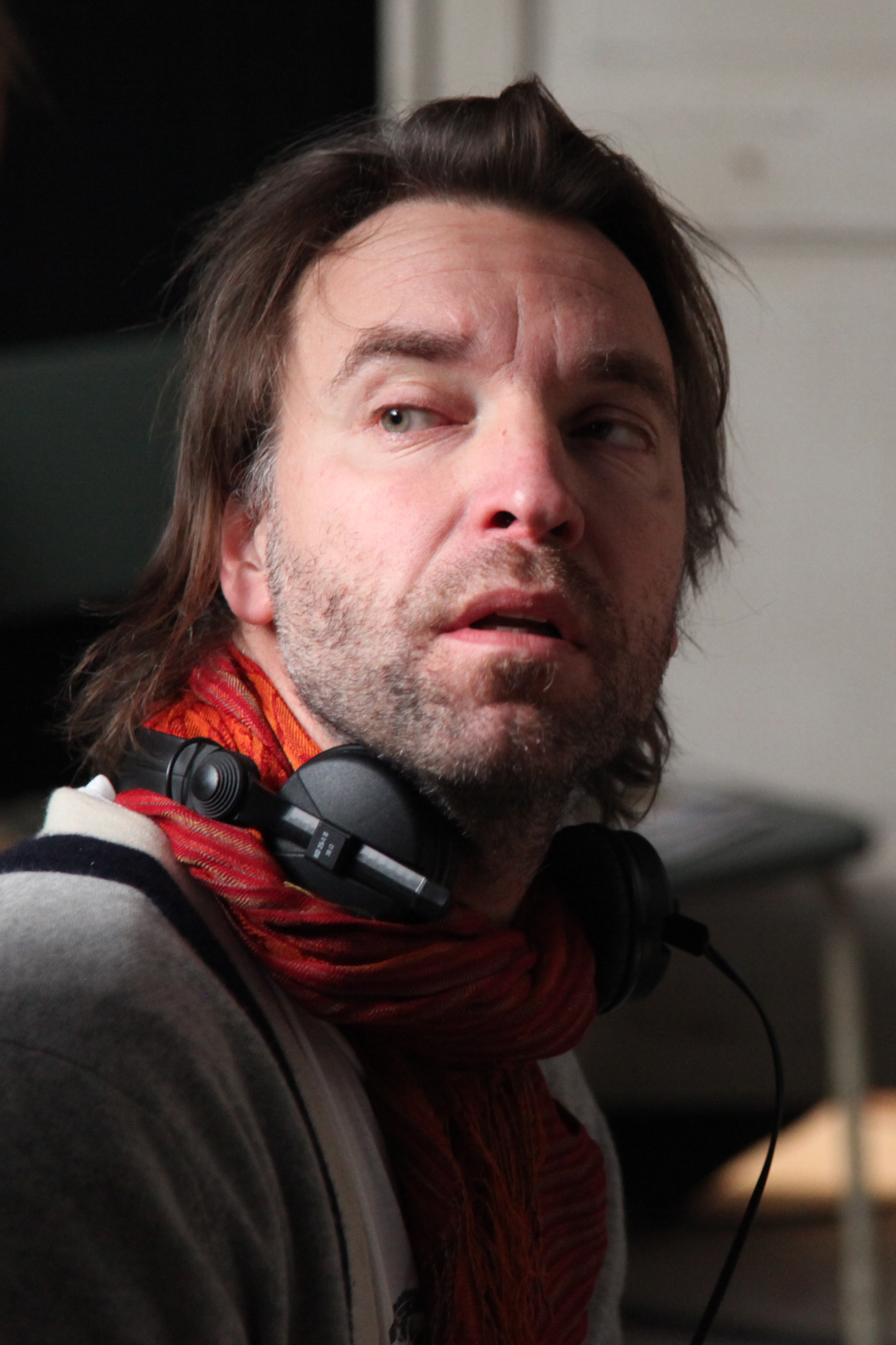
- Mårlind in 2012
- Born: Måns Magnus Mårlind; 29 July 1969 (age 57); Vallentuna, Stockholm County, Sweden
- Occupations: Director; screenwriter
- Years active: 1997–present
- Partner: Tuppence Middleton
- Children: 1

Måns Magnus Mårlind (born 29 July 1969) is a Swedish director and screenwriter. After making his feature film debut in 2005, he co-directed the big-budget horror films Shelter (2010) and Underworld: Awakening (2012). He co-created the Danish–Swedish crime thriller The Bridge (2011–2018). This was adapted as The Tunnel, a British–French production that ran from 2013 to 2018.

== Career ==
Mårlind attended film programs at Stockholm University, Sweden and American Film Institute along with Björn Stein, with whom he would start a long-standing directorial partnership. His first work was as a writer for the 1995 Swedish drama series Radioskugga, followed by the children's science fiction series Kenny Starfighter (1997).

He worked as an assistant director on Aspiranterna (1998), Jakten på en mördare (1999), and Anna Holt (1999).

=== Work with Björn Stein ===
In 2005, Mårlind and Björn Stein made their directorial feature film debut with the fantasy thriller Storm. They next released the 2010 supernatural thriller Shelter (also known as 6 Souls in the United States), starring Julianne Moore and Jonathan Rhys Meyers, and based on a screenplay by UK screenwriter Michael Cooney. Mårlind and Stein co-directed Underworld: Awakening (2012), which starred Kate Beckinsale as Selene and grossed over $160 million worldwide.

They co-directed Shed No Tears (2013), based on songs of singer-songwriter Håkan Hellström. This film was nominated for nine Guldbagge Awards (the Swedish equivalent of the Academy Awards), including Best Director and Best Film.

For television, the duo directed all episodes of the Swedish-French police procedural Midnight Sun (2016). They also co-directed the Netflix-distributed historical thriller The Defeated (2020), also known as Shadowplay. Both series were created and written by Mårlind.

== Personal life ==
Mårlind is the father of one child with English actress Tuppence Middleton, born in August 2022.

== Filmography ==
=== Film ===
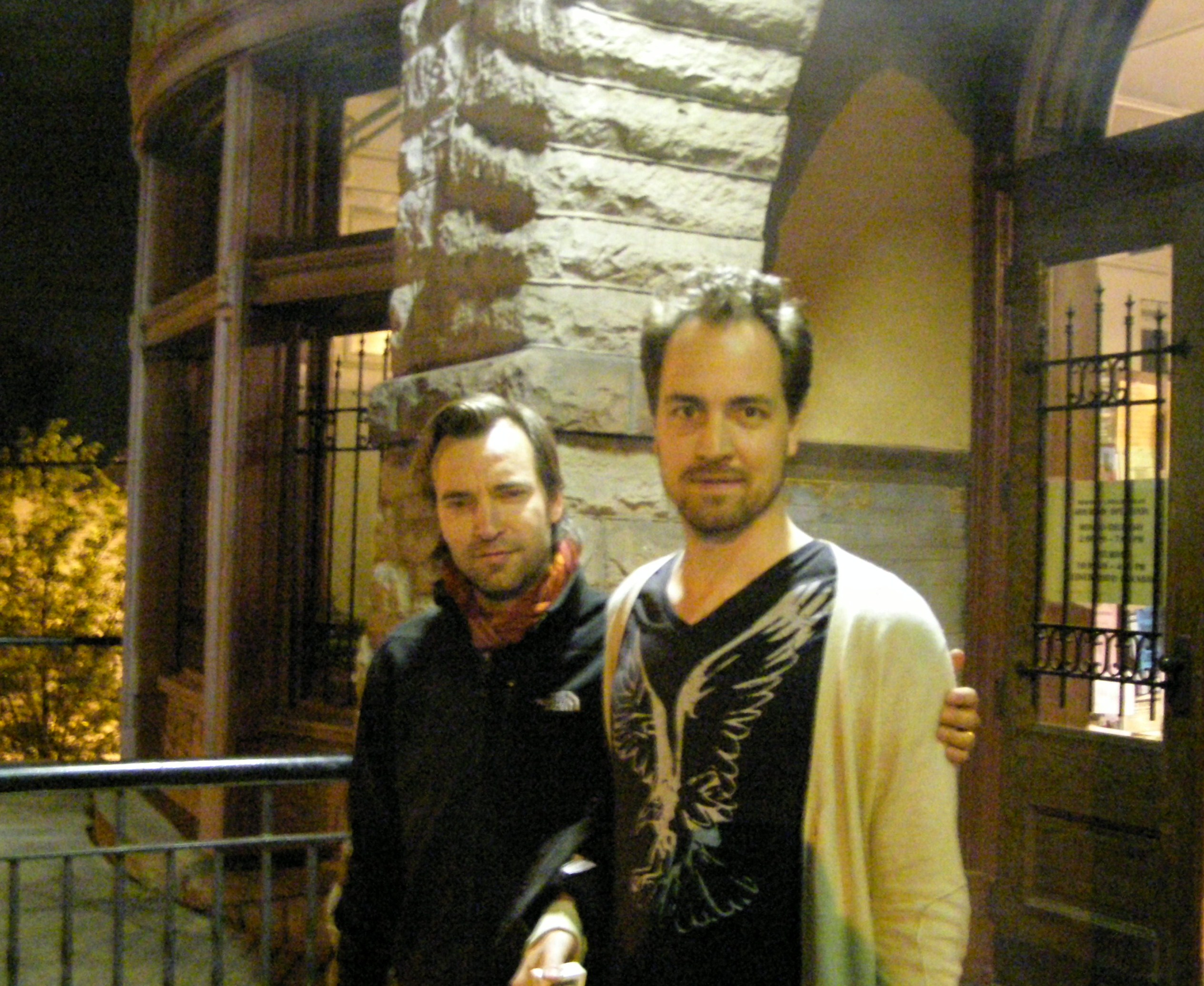
Mårlind (left) and Björn Stein during the filming of Shelter at the Braddock Carnegie Library in May 2008

Year	Title	Director	Writer	Notes
2002	Disco Kung Fu	Yes	No	Short film
2005	Storm	Yes	Yes	
2010	Shelter	Yes	No	
2012	Underworld: Awakening	Yes	No	
2013	Shed No Tears	Yes	No	
2019	Swoon	Yes	Yes	

=== Television ===
Year	Title	Director	Writer	Creator
1997	Radioskugga	No	Yes	No
1997	Kenny Starfighter	No	Yes	No
2000	Brottsvåg	No	Yes	Yes
2000–2001	Sjätte dagen	Yes	Yes	No
2002–2004	Spung	Yes	No	No
2003	De drabbade	Yes	Yes	Yes
2006	Snapphanar	Yes	No	No
2011–2018	The Bridge	No	Yes	Yes
2016	Midnight Sun	Yes	Yes	Yes
2020	The Defeated	Yes	Yes	Yes

== Awards and nominations ==
Year	Award	Category	Work	Result
2005	Stockholm International Film Festival	Audience Award	Storm	Won
2006	Guldbagge Awards	Best Film	Storm	Nominated
2006	Guldbagge Awards	Cinema Audience Award	Storm	Nominated
2006	Puchon International Fantastic Film Festival	Best Director	Storm	Won
2006	Puchon International Fantastic Film Festival	Best of Puchon	Storm	Nominated
2006	Neuchâtel International Fantastic Film Festival	Narcisse Award for Best Feature Film	Storm	Nominated
2006	Amsterdam Fantastic Film Festival	Méliès Award	Storm	Won
2014	Guldbagge Awards	Best Director	Shed No Tears	Nominated
2014	Guldbagge Awards	Best Film	Shed No Tears	Nominated
2014	Gothenburg Film Festival	City of Gothenburg Award	Shed No Tears	Nominated
2016	Series Mania	Audience Award	Midnight Sun	Won
2016	Roma Fiction Fest	Best Director	Midnight Sun	Won
2016	Roma Fiction Fest	Best Script	Midnight Sun	Won
2017	Association des Critiques de Séries	Best Direction	Midnight Sun	Nominated
2019	Neuchâtel International Fantastic Film Festival	Silver Méliès Award for Best European Film	Swoon	Nominated
