= Waltz for Monica =

- Theatrical release poster
- Directed by: Per Fly
- Written by: Peter Birro
- Produced by: Lena Rehnberg
- Starring: Edda Magnason; Kjell Bergqvist; Sverrir Gudnason; Nadja Christiansson; Vera Vitali; David Hellenius; Oskar Thunberg; Johannes Wanselow; Cecilia Ljung; Fredrik Lindborg; Ralph Bernard; Randal D. Ingram; Jonathan Drew; Amelia Fowler
- Cinematography: Eric Kress
- Edited by: Åsa Mossberg
- Music by: Peter Nordahl
- Production company: StellaNova Film
- Distributed by: Svensk Filmindustri
- Release dates: 10 August 2013 (Way Out West); 13 September 2013 (Sweden)
- Running time: 111 minutes
- Country: Sweden
- Languages: Swedish; English

Waltz for Monica (Swedish: Monica Z) is a Swedish biographical drama film directed by Per Fly. It is based on the life and career of the singer and actress Monica Zetterlund, portrayed by Edda Magnason. The film was released theatrically in Sweden on 13 September 2013.

== Plot ==
Monica makes it from a telephone operator to a national celebrity. But fame and party life take their toll.

== Cast ==
- Edda Magnason as Monica Zetterlund
- Sverrir Gudnason as Sture Åkerberg
- Kjell Bergqvist as Monica's father
- Cecilia Ljung as Monica's mother
- Vera Vitali as Marika
- Johannes Wanselow as Beppe Wolgers
- Oskar Thunberg as Vilgot Sjöman
- Randal D. Ingram as Bill Evans
- Rob Morgan as Miles Davis
- Amelia Fowler as Ella Fitzgerald
- Clinton Ingram as Tommy Flanagan
- Harry Friedländer as Hasse Alfredson
- Andréa Ager-Hanssen as Lena Nyman

== Reception ==
Waltz for Monica received generally positive reviews. In Sweden, Kulturnyheterna on SVT gave it a 4 out of 5 and especially praised Magnason's performance. Svenska Dagbladet also praised Magnason's performance, giving the film a 4 out of 6. MovieZine also liked the film, giving it 4 out of 5. Many newspapers gave the film with a 4 out of 5, among them Aftonbladet, Expressen, Göteborgs-Posten and Metro. However, the film was criticized by the documentary filmmaker Tom Alandh, who wrote an article in the newspaper Dagens Nyheter where he objected to the film's negative portrayal of Zetterlund's father.

Waltz for Monica received 11 Guldbagge Award nominations.

== Soundtrack ==
A soundtrack album of the film was released by Universal Music, charting in various Scandinavian charts, notably Sweden, Finland and Denmark.

=== Track listing ===
1. "Sakta vi gå genom stan"
2. "Hit The Road Jack"
3. "Monica's vals"
4. "O vad en liten gumma kan gno"
5. "En gång i Stockholm"
6. "It Could Happen to You"
7. "Gröna små äpplen"
8. "Trubbel"
9. "Du"
10. "Bedårande sommarvals"
11. "I Can't Give You Anything But Love"
12. "I New York"
13. "Monica Z – Svit ur filmen"

=== Charts ===
Chart (2014)	Peak position
Danish Albums (Hitlisten)	29
Finnish Albums (Suomen virallinen lista)	50
Swedish Albums (Sverigetopplistan)	3
