= Snapphane =

17th-century pro-Danish militiaman

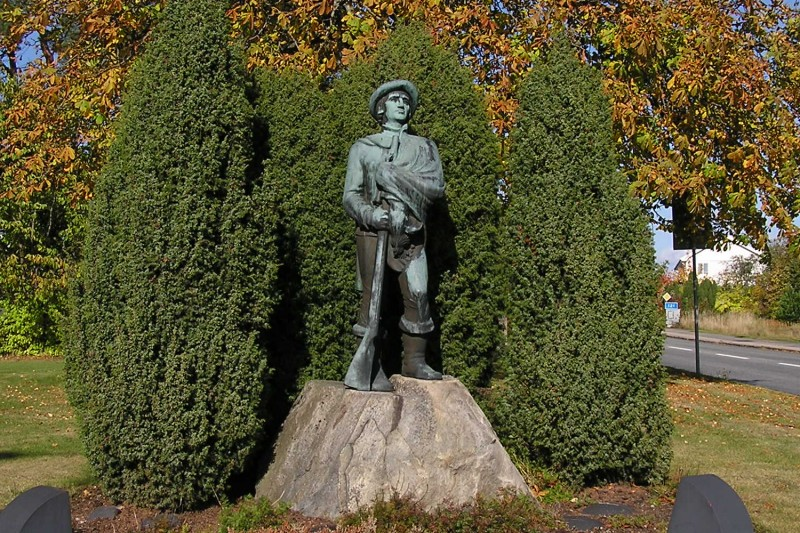
- Snapphanevägen statue at Loshult Road in Lönsboda. Designed by Anders Jönsson
- Dates active: 17th-century
- Ideology: pro-Danish
- Wars: Torstenson War, Second Northern, and Scanian Wars

A snapphane was a member of a 17th-century pro-Danish guerrilla organization, auxiliaries or paramilitary troops that fought against the Swedes in the Second Northern and Scanian Wars, primarily in the eastern former Danish provinces that had become southern Sweden in these wars. The term was a derogatory reference for those the Swedish authorities considered illegal combatants.

== Categories ==
Snapphanar were of five general categories:

- Regular special forces from the Danish army sent to work behind enemy lines to disrupt communications and supply lines, obtain intelligence, prevent Swedish tax collection, catch traitors, and help Danes escape from enemy territory. Captain Pieter Sten, who the Swedes considered the fiercest of snapphanar, spent part of his time in the regular army and ran a spy central at the Ringsøe lake (now Ringsjön). Nicolai Hermansen held similar roles.
- The King's friskytter were lightly armed cavalry units who fought in the rear and did the same tasks as the first category but on a day-to-day basis. Specialists like Pieter Sten would organize the friskytter into companies or assign volunteers to companies and constitute a link between the friskytter and the Danish authorities. Their role verged between that of paramilitary and auxiliaries in that they were paid by the state, worked on the orders of the Danish military headquarters. They were sent over to lodgings in Denmark proper, similar to regular soldiers when the campaign season was over. Friskytte units were often set up on a regional basis so that all volunteers from one hundred (herred) signed up for the same company, but as the war continued, the companies shifted shape many times. There were at least two student companies, with recruits from the universities of Copenhagen and Lund. Some units were mainly for soldiers and veterans from both the Danish and Swedish armies. The vast majority of friskytter were Scanian, but there was also a mix of Danes, Germans, Poles, and Swedes. These cavalry units of 40–100 operated over large areas. Their main task was to attack the Swedish army's supply lines, although all of the functions listed for category 1 were valid for them as well. They also worked with highly specialized units of Croat cavalry hired by the Danish king. Major General Meerheim in the regular Danish army was ultimately responsible for the operations.
- Ordinary peasants and yeoman farmers who continued their day-to-day lives but took up arms against approaching Swedish forces when necessary; this category was most common in the initial stages of a war but continued throughout. These combatants were similar to modern partisans or guerrillas.
- Another group of snapphanar were Danish bailiffs (folder), who supervised Danish tax collection and foraging and often clashed with Swedish troops with the same intentions.

Often these four groups collaborated and contributed to various Danish war operations, and most often, they were controlled from Copenhagen.

- A final category of snapphanar was bandits, looters, and carpetbaggers who roamed the land and had little to do with either warring party. Their looting was directed at the Swedish army and, to a greater extent, the civilian population. The sources show that there were criminals on both sides who exploited the local population.

These five categories of the fighter were all considered snapphanar by the Swedes, and if caught, were all punished as such. However, these combatants themselves did not use this term, and those in Category 2 and 3 strongly preferred the word friskytter.

== Strategic background ==
A large part of Scania was no-man's land during the Scanian war. The Danes had taken refuge in the two enclaves of Landskrona and Helsingborg and the Swedes in Malmö and later in Kristianstad, but the rest of the territory was stateless and small parties of cavalry would be sent out from the fortified enclaves to stock up, forage and seek out skirmishes with the enemy. This kind of war was called "party warfare" or "petty war" and was typical of early modern Europe when firearms began to make a serious impact and warfare became increasingly expensive and difficult to carry out in the traditional sense. Large field battles usually did not give a definite result but cost huge sums of money. Instead, there was usually a war of attrition between different garrisons that sat in fortified cities such as Kristianstad in Skåne or Kristiansand in Norway. A gloomy consequence of this kind of warfare was that the land around the fortresses was completely destroyed because of scorched earth tactics where both sides burned everything, so that the enemy did not get it.

The easiest plan in such situations was to use agile small troops, usually cavalry, but also infantry. On the continent the Habsburg, Croats were among the most skillful troops and the Danes hired small contingents of Croats to co-operate with the Danish specialists in petty war - the friskytter.

During the Scanian War, many Scanians who lived in the western part of Scania could quite easily join the regular Danish army, after the temporary 1676 Danish re-conquest of the province. But in the North (closer to Sweden), this was more difficult. However, Scanians who joined the army or were drafted were often sent to the friskytte units, like the Copenhagen student Jörgen Wesseltoft who was partly friskytte, partly one of the king's guards. In any case, the partisan movement was the most common way to support the Danish side. The movement did also return during the 1711 Danish attempt to regain Scania.

== Origin of the word ==
The term snapphane, which was used as a pejorative term by the Swedes to describe the pro-Danish rebels, was originally a word for gangs of bandits that lived in the woods. When Scanian exiled peasants were organized by the Danish king into bands that fought the Swedes with guerrilla warfare, they were also referred to as snapphane.

Because the movement supported the Danish invasion during the Scanian War, Swedish authorities fought the snapphanar brutally, and if captured, these fighters were usually executed and their corpses impaled and shown where the locals could see them and be intimidated into obedience. A common method of execution was the breaking wheel.

The snapphane insurgency was initially successful, but as the tide of the war turned against Denmark, the strength of the snapphane movement became more depleted. The snapphane movement was eventually defeated by a ruthless campaign waged by the Swedish Army, compelling all Scanian peasants to swear allegiance to the King of Sweden. This effectively created a wedge between the snapphane movement and most of the population. Instructed by their Danish paymasters to kill Scanian peasants loyal to the Swedish crown, the snapphane bands soon turned on the local population and thus undermined all popular support for the Danish king.

A determined Swedification policy was reportedly so effective that when a Danish invasion army landed in 1709 in the wake of the Battle of Poltava, the local population was raised in a militia to fight against them. Participation in this was limited. The last suspected snapphane, Nils Tuasen‚ was executed in 1700 for slaying a Swedish soldier in 1677. He had allegedly spent 22 years in exile in Denmark but ultimately returned, upon which he was arrested and put to death.

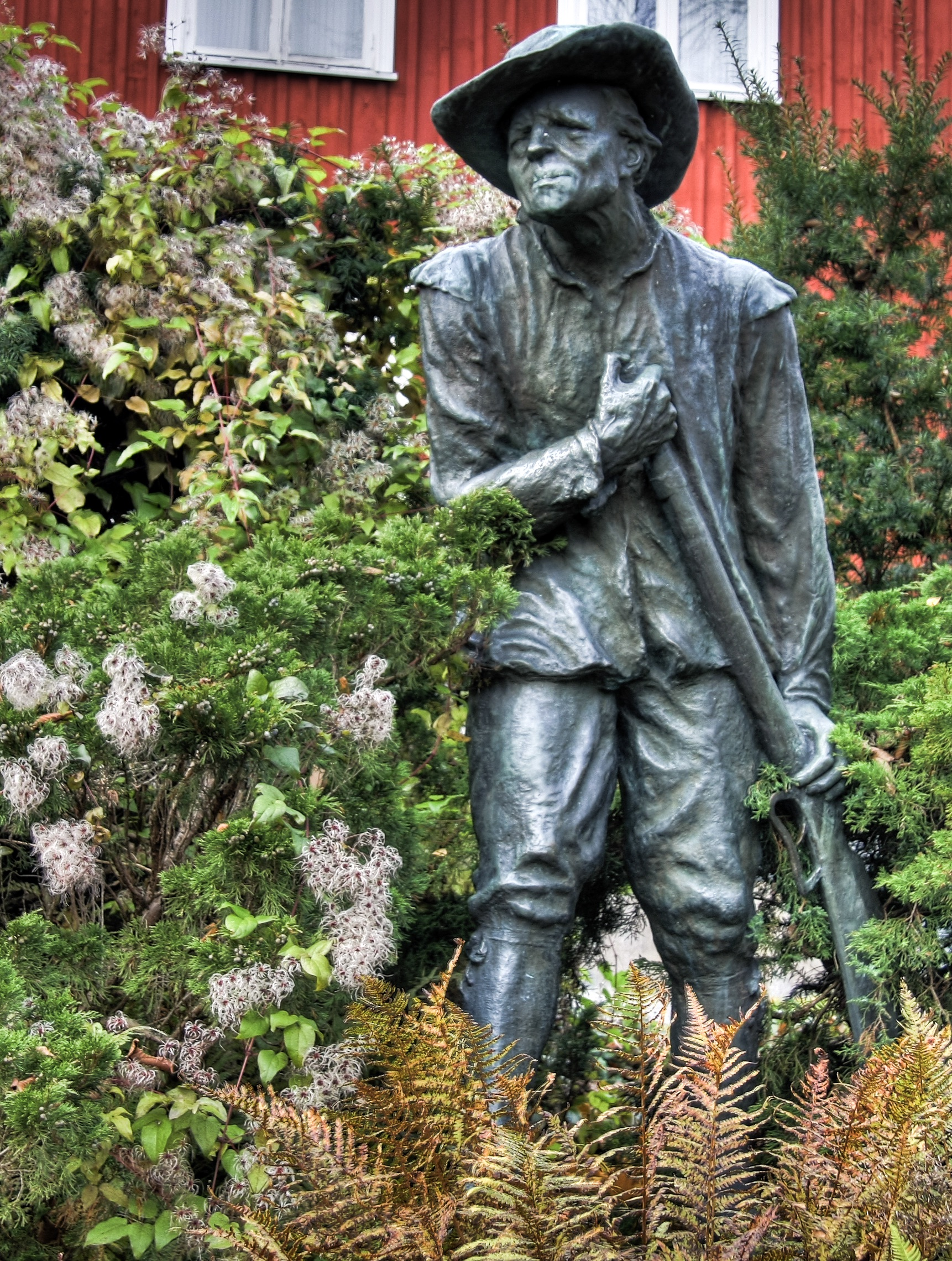
Snapphanen from 1934 by artist Axel Ebbe portraits the snapphane Lille Mads, a member of the pro-Danish guerrilla active in southern Sweden in the 17th century. The statue is placed in the Hembygdsparken park in Hässleholm

Snapphanar made an impact on Swedish popular culture. In modern times, the Swedish Navy patrol boat P161 is named HMS Snapphanen. It is part of a class of vessels several of which are named after paramilitary professions, like Kaparen (privateer), Spejaren (scout), etc.

== Literature ==
- Kim Hazelius, De Kallades Snapphanar.. Bokpro Bjärnum 2006 (ISBN 91-89336-40-2).
- K Arne Blom, Jan Moen, Snapphaneboken.
- Palle Lauring (1952). Danmark i Skåne. Stockholm: Berghs förlag, 1999 (ISBN 91-502-1368-7).
- Herman Lindquist (1995). Historien om Sverige – storhet och fall. Norstedts Förlag, 2006 (ISBN 91-1-301535-4).
- Mats Olsson (2001). "Att icke understå sig att lämna sina hemman: Om bondeklassens frihet och adelns dominans i Skåne". Historisk Tidskrift, 2001 (1): 5–28. ISSN 0345-469X.
- Sixten Svensson (2005). Sanningen om snapphanelögnen. (ISBN 91-975695-1-8).
- Sten Skansjö (1997). Skånes historia. Lund (ISBN 91-88930-95-5).
- Alf Åberg, (1951).Snapphanarna. Stockholm: LTs Förlag.
- Alf Åberg (1994). Kampen om Skåne under försvenskningstiden. Stockholm: Natur & Kultur (912704355X).
- Alf Åberg (1975). I snapphanebygd. Stockholm: Rabén & Sjögren.
- Cederborg, Carl August (1913). Kopparskrinet.
- Cederborg, Carl August (1987). Mickel Göing.
- Cederborg, Carl August (1912). Göingehövdingen I.
- Cederborg, Carl August (1912). Göingehövdingen II.
- Vadenbring, Jojan. "Snapphanar och friskyttar i lundabygden", pp. 164–171 in Sten Skansjö (ed.), Lunds historia - staden och omlandet. 2, Lunds kommun, Lund 2012
- Fabricius, Knud. Skaanes overgang fra Danmark til Sverige I-V, Copenhagen 1906–1958

== In popular culture ==
A historical miniseries entitled Snapphanar was made for Swedish television in 2006. A film featuring Edvard Persson from 1941 bears the same name.

== See also ==
- Snaphance
