= MovieZine =

Swedish film and entertainment website

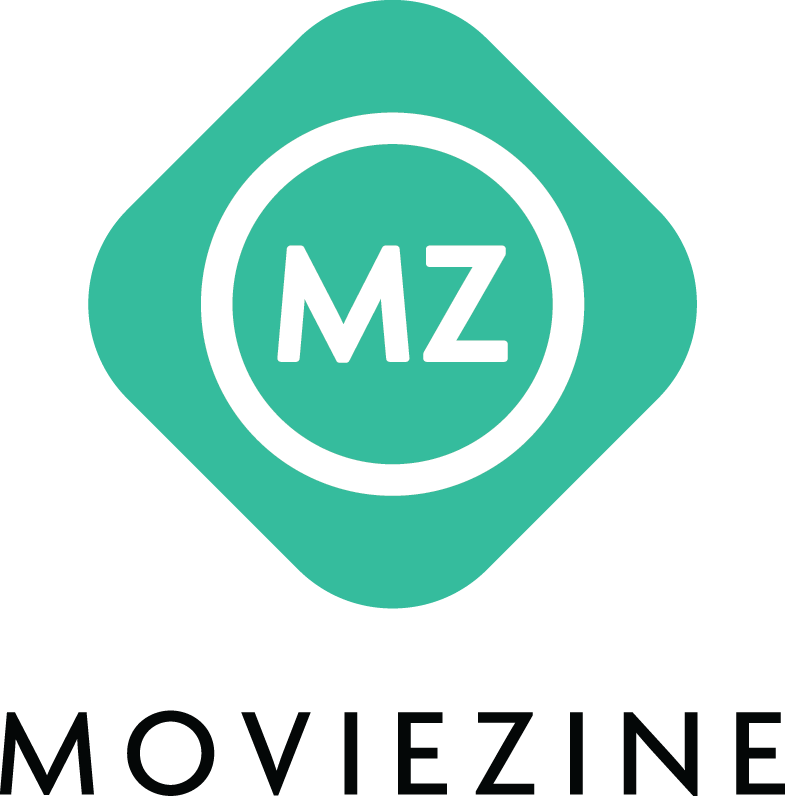
- Available in: Swedish
- Country of origin: Sweden

MovieZine is a Swedish film and entertainment website that focuses on news and reviews. It was founded in 2003 and is Sweden's most popular film and television series website.
