= When Darkness Falls (2006 film) =

- Directed by: Anders Nilsson
- Starring: Oldoz Javidi; Lia Boysen
- Release date: 20 October 2006
- Running time: 2h 13min
- Country: Sweden
- Language: Swedish

When Darkness Falls (Swedish: När mörkret faller) is a 2006 Swedish drama film directed by Anders Nilsson.

== Cast ==
- Oldoz Javidi - Leyla
- Lia Boysen - Carina
- Reuben Sallmander - Aram
- Per Graffman - Peter
- Bahar Pars - Nina
- Mina Azarian - Mamman
- Jacob Francis Worrall - Milo
