= Søren Stærmose =

Danish film producer

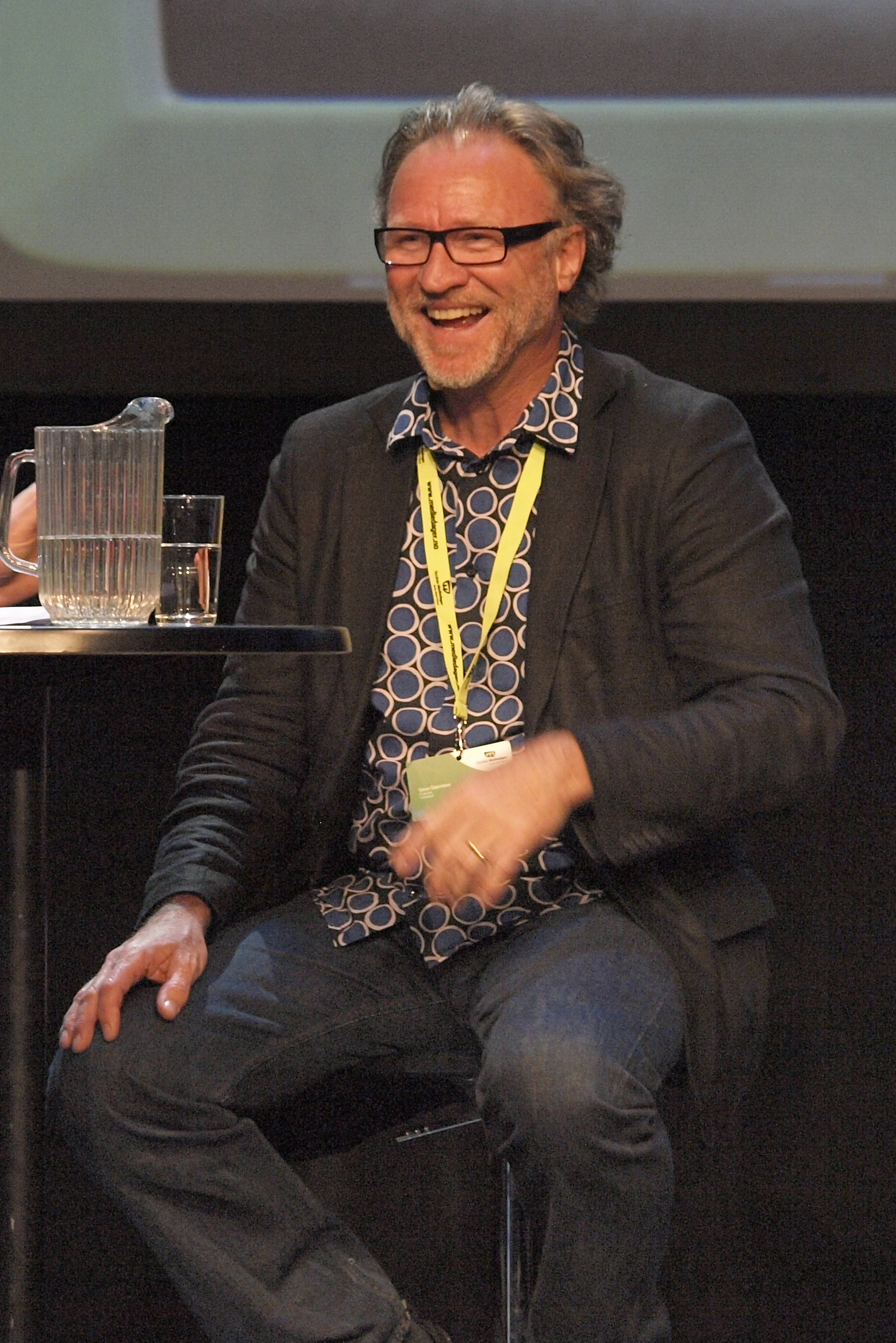
- Born: 20 April 1952 (age 74); Odense, Denmark
- Education: University of Copenhagen
- Occupation: Filmmaker

Søren Stærmose (born 20 April 1952 in Odense) is a Danish film producer.

== Filmography ==
- Christian, (1989)
- Grandpa's Journey, (1993)
- The Fire Engine That Disappeared, (executive, 1993)
- Murder at the Savoy, (1993)
- The Man on the Balcony, (executive, 1993)
- The Police Murderer, (executive, 1994)
- Stockholm Marathon, (1994)
- Lumière and Company, (1995)
- The Disappearance of Finbar, (1996)
- A Corner of Paradise, (1997)
- Zingo, (1998)
- Capricciosa, (2003)
- Wallander, (2005-2006)
- Irene Huss, (2007-2008)
- The Girl with the Dragon Tattoo, (2009)
- The Girl Who Played with Fire, (2009)
- The Girl Who Kicked the Hornets' Nest, (2009)
- Millennium, (2010)
- The Girl with the Dragon Tattoo, (2011)
- A Place in the Sun, (2012)
- Echoes from the Dead, (2013)
- Det som göms i snö, (2018)
- The Girl in the Spider's Web, (2018)
- Thin Ice, (2020)
