= Hjulström =

Hjulström is a Swedish surname. Notable people with the surname include:

- Carin Hjulström (born 1963), Swedish television presenter, journalist and writer
- Embla Hjulström (born 1994), Swedish actress
- Filip Hjulström (1902–1982), Swedish geographer
  - Hjulström curve
- Lennart Hjulström (1938–2022), Swedish actor and film director
- Niklas Hjulström (born 1962), Swedish actor, singer and film director
