= Stefan Nilsson (composer) =

Swedish composer and pianist (1955–2023)

Stefan Nilsson (27 July 1955 – 25 May 2023) was a Swedish composer and pianist who wrote music for feature films and television shows, including Bille August's Pelle the Conqueror and The Best Intentions, as well as Kay Pollak's As It Is in Heaven.

Born in Kukasjärvi, Hietaniemi, in the north of Sweden, Nilsson studied music at Framnäs folkhögskola outside of Piteå., where he developed an interest in jazz. At that time, he formed the progressive jazz group Kornet which also, among others, featured Örjan Fahlström, another prolific jazz musician, arranger and composer. The group existed until the late 1970s, and released three albums. Simultaneously, Nilsson continued to study music at the Royal Academy of Music in Stockholm 1975–1977.

As a film composer, Nilsson wrote numerous scores for Swedish filmmakers such as Gösta Ekman, Hans Alfredson and Peter Dalle. To international audiences, he is best known for his music for the films of Bille August, for whom he scored Pelle the Conqueror (1987), The Best Intentions (1991), Jerusalem (1996) and A Song for Martin (2001). In Sweden, due to the success of the film in the domestic box office and the hit song he wrote for it to lyrics by Py Bäckman, Kay Pollak's As It Is in Heaven is possibly the best known of his film works. The song, "Gabriellas sång", performed by Helen Sjöholm, was featured in the Swedish Radio's Svensktoppen (a domestic hit chart for Swedish popular music) for 68 consecutive weeks 2004–2006. In 2005, Stefan received a "Best Composer" award nomination at the European Film Awards for his work on As It Is in Heaven. In 1998, he was awarded the Swedish film award, Guldbaggen, for "creative contributions to Swedish film"

Few of Nilsson's film scores have been released commercially, but a compilation of album of his most important themes (Filmmusik) was released by Virgin Records in Sweden in 1998. Stylistically, the film scores Nilsson was best known for, such as his works for Bille August, were restrained, romantic and sparsely orchestrated, mostly focusing on melodic content for piano and woodwinds, accompanied by strings. His music has often been described as being melancholic, although not necessarily in minor mode. Other scores, such as Morrhår och ärtor and Lotta på Bråkmakargatan, showcased his affinity for jazz and other forms of popular music.

In popular music and jazz, outside the world of film, Stefan collaborated extensively, among others, with Swedish singer Tommy Körberg. Among their projects were albums where the two made new interpretations of the music of Jacques Brel, and created new songs based on Swedish poetry.

Stefan was the cousin of prolific rock singer Pugh Rogefeldt. He was married to musician Lotta Hasselquist Nilsson and had two daughters. In February 2023, Stefan was diagnosed with ALS and died on 23 May 2023. On 8 May, a number of friends and colleagues such as Benny Andersson, Helen Sjöholm and Tommy Körberg, staged a tribute concert to Stefan, Musik för livet ("Music for Life"), where Stefan himself, despite his condition, chose to participate at the piano. His final months in life were documented by Swedish filmmaker Tom Alandh in two TV documentares, Beskedet and Min död är min. His life was portrayed in the Swedish Radio documentary Stefan Nilsson – ett vemod i dur.

== List of film and television scores ==
- Wars Don't End (2018)
- Let the Scream Be Heard (2013)
- The Optimists (2013)
- Marie Krøyer (2012)
- Liv & Ingmar (2012)
- The Woman Who Dreamed of a Man (2010)
- Deliver Us from Evil (2009)
- Himlens hjärta (2008)
- Fallet G (2006)
- Svalan, katten, rosen, döden (2006)
- Moreno and the Silence (2006)
- Borkmann's Point (2005)
- Münsters fall (2005)
- Kim Novak Never Swam in Genesaret's Lake (2005)
- Carambole (2005)
- As It Is in Heaven (2004)
- Detaljer (TV, 2003)
- Wolf Summer (2003)
- A Song for Martin (2001)
- Birthmarked (TV, 2001)
- False Accusation (TV, 2001)
- The Wide Net (TV, 2000)
- Skärgårdsdoktorn (TV, 1997–2000)
- Unmarried Couples: A Comedy That Will Break You Up (1997)
- Persons parfymeri (TV, 1997)
- Juloratoriet (1996)
- Jerusalem (1996)
- Lotta på Bråkmakargatan (TV, 1995–1996)
- Against the Odds (1995)
- Body Switch (1995)
- Stora och små män (1995)
- Min vän Percys magiska gymnastikskor (TV, 1994)
- Yrrol – En kolossalt genomtänkt film (1994)
- Stockholm Marathon (1994)
- The Police Murderer (1994)
- Mannen på balkongen (1993)
- Murder at the Savoy (1993)
- Roseanna (1993)
- Lotta 2 – Lotta flyttar hemifrån (1993)
- Brandbilen som försvann (1993)
- Lotta på Bråkmakargatan (1992)
- Kvällspressen (TV, 1992)
- The Best Intentions (1992)
- Den ofrivillige golfaren (1991)
- Kära farmor (TV, 1990)
- Sweetwater (1988)
- The Time of the Wolf (1988)
- Pelle the Conqueror (1987)
- Jim & Piraterna Blom (1987)
- The Serpent's Way (1986)
- Morrhår & ärtor (1986)
- False as Water (1985)
- Smugglarkungen (1985)
- The Inside Man (1984)
- Lyckans ost (1983)
- Cirkus Skrot (TV, 1983)
- Kalabaliken i Bender (1983)
- Ett hjärta av guld (TV, 1982)
- Tamara – La Donna d'Oro (TV, 1982)
- Sally and Freedom (1981)
