= Mirja Turestedt =

Swedish actress

- Born: Mirja Turestedt; 1972 (age 53–54); Borås, Sweden
- Occupation: Actress

Mirja Turestedt (born 1972 in Borås (grew up in Malmö and Gothenburg)) is a Swedish actress.

Turestedt studied at Gothenburg Theatre Academy 1998–2002. She appeared in Slott i Sverige at the Royal Dramatic Theatre until November 2010 and in 2011 she appeared in Tartuffe at Stockholm City Theatre.

== Selected filmography ==
- 2002 - Pepparrotslandet (TV)
- 2003 - De drabbade (TV)
- 2003 - Kommissarie Winter (TV)
- 2003 - Kvinnor emellan (TV)
- 2003 - Lejontämjaren
- 2007 - Arn – The Knight Templar
- 2007 - Labyrint (TV)
- 2007 - The Truth About Marika (TV)
- 2008 - Les Grandes Personnes
- 2008 - Oskyldigt dömd (TV)
- 2009 - A Midsummer Night’s Party
- 2009 - The Girl Who Kicked the Hornets' Nest (Luftslottet som sprängdes) as Monica Figuerola
- 2019 - Arctic Crimes
- 2023 - Barracuda Queens (TV)
