= Gerd Hegnell =

Swedish actress (born 1935)

Gerd Anne Therése Hegnell
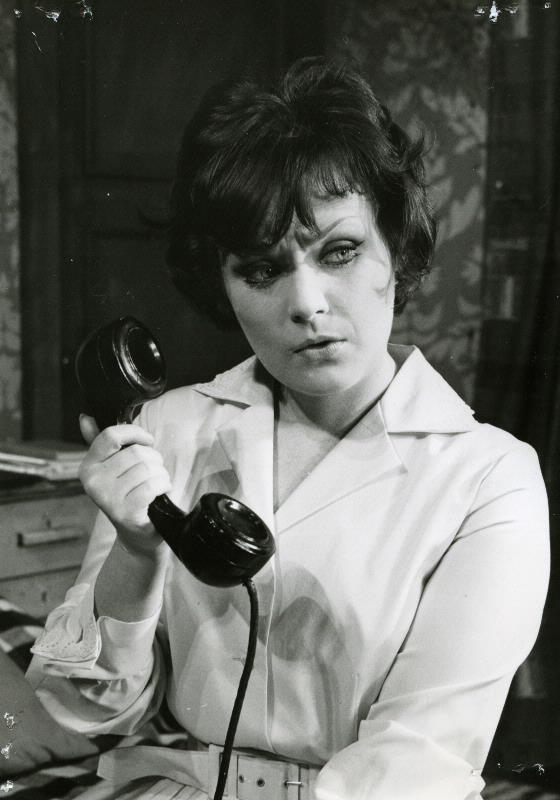
- Born: 25 June 1935 (age 91); Helsingborg, Sweden
- Citizenship: Sweden
- Occupation: Actress
- Spouse: Per Oscarsson (m. 1954; div. 1960)

Gerd Anne Therése Hegnell (born 25 June 1935) is a Swedish actress. She received the "Carl Åkermark Scholarship" of the Swedish Academy in 1992. Hegnell educated at a theatre school at Gothenburg City Theatre 1953–56.

During many years she was engaged at the Folkteatern in Gothenburg where she performed many presentations, among them Magnus Nilsson's Knäckebröd och hovmästarsås in 1988 and Carin Mannheimer's Rika barn leka bäst in 1995 (and in 1997, then in the film with the same name).

After she finished at Folkteatern she played at private theatres in Stockholm, among them Two into One at Chinateatern in 1998 and the musical Singin' in the Rain at Oscarsteatern in 2006. Another popular appearance was in Staffan Göthe's play Ett lysande elände at the Royal Dramatic Theatre.

== Selected filmography ==
- 2010 - Tusen gånger starkare
- 2003 - Solbacken: Avd. E (TV)
- 2002 - Rederiet (TV)
- 2002 - Suxxess
- 2001 - Känd från TV
- 2000 - Hur som helst är han jävligt död
- 1998 - När karusellerna sover (TV)
- 1996 - Kalle Blomkvist – Mästerdetektiven lever farligt
- 1996 - Juloratoriet
- 1995 - En på miljonen
- 1991 - Önskas
- 1990 - Ebba och Didrik (TV)
- 1990 - Kurt Olsson – filmen om mitt liv som mig själv
- 1984 - Berget på månens baksida
- 1982 - Polisen som vägrade svara (TV)
- 1955 - Kärlek på turné
