= Ing-Marie Carlsson =

Swedish actress

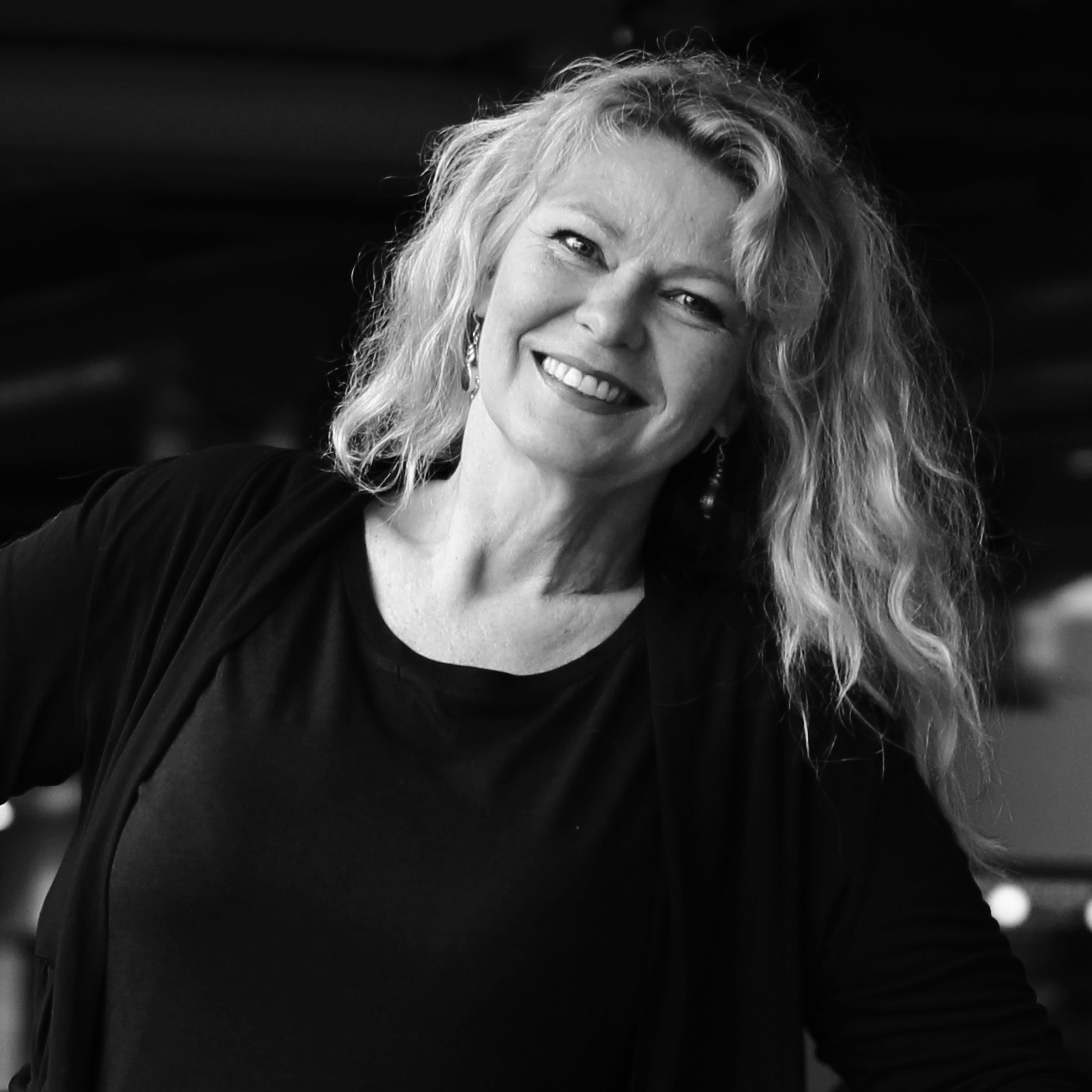
- Kjell Bergqvist in 2015.
- Born: Ing-Marie Gunilla Jessica Carlsson; 25 February 1957 (age 69); Jönköping, Sweden
- Occupation: Actress
- Years active: 1981–present
- Children: 3

Ing-Marie Gunilla Jessica Carlsson (born 25 February 1957) is a Swedish actress. Carlsson lives in Södermalm, Stockholm.

Carlsson was educated at NAMA in Gothenburg and graduated in 1982. After that she worked at Götateatern and the Borås City Theatre. In 1997, she participated in Alla var där at Folkan, including roles as Kjell Bergqvist and Carina Lidbom. In 2001, she was nominated for a Golden Mask for her role in Dagens dubbel at the Halmstad Theater with Tomas Pettersson. She also appeared in Göran Stangertz's production of Death of a Salesman at the Helsingborg City Theatre, which also starred Lars-Erik Berenett. In the summer of 2007, Carlsson participated in Den stora premiären at Frediksdalsteatern in Helsingborg.

== Filmography ==
=== Film ===
- Livet i Fagervik (2008)
- Beck – I Guds namn (2007)
- Beck – Det tysta skriket (2007)
- Beck – Den svaga länken (2007)
- Beck – Den japanska shungamålningen (2007)
- Beck – Gamen (2007)
- Beck – Advokaten (2006)
- Beck – Flickan i jordkällaren (2006)
- Beck – Skarpt läge (2006)
- Stilla natt (2006)
- Wallander – Hemligheten (2006)
- Att göra en pudel (2006)
- Oh Shit! (2005)
- Sex, hopp & kärlek (2005)
- Kommer du med mig då (2003)
- Once in a Lifetime (2000)
- Brottsvåg (2000)
- En liten julsaga (1999)
- Reine & Mimmi i fjällen! (1997)
- Bert: The Last Virgin (1995)
- Sixten (1994)
- House of Angels – The Second Summer (1994)
- Pillertrillaren (1994)
- The Slingshot (1993)
- Murder at the Savoy (1993)
- The Man on the Balcony (1993)
- The Fire Engine That Disappeared (1993)
- House of Angels (1992)
- Blackjack (1990)
- False as Water (1985)
- My Life as a Dog (1985)
- Tuppen (1981)

=== Theatre ===
- Den stora premiären (2007)
- Dagens dubbel (2001)
- Alla var där (1997)

=== TV series ===
- Oskyldigt dömd (2008)
- Kommissionen (2005)
- Julens hjältar (1999)
- Bert (1994)
- Tre kronor (1994)
- Mimmi (1988)
