= Hans Rosenfeldt =

Swedish screenwriter, radio presenter, novelist and actor

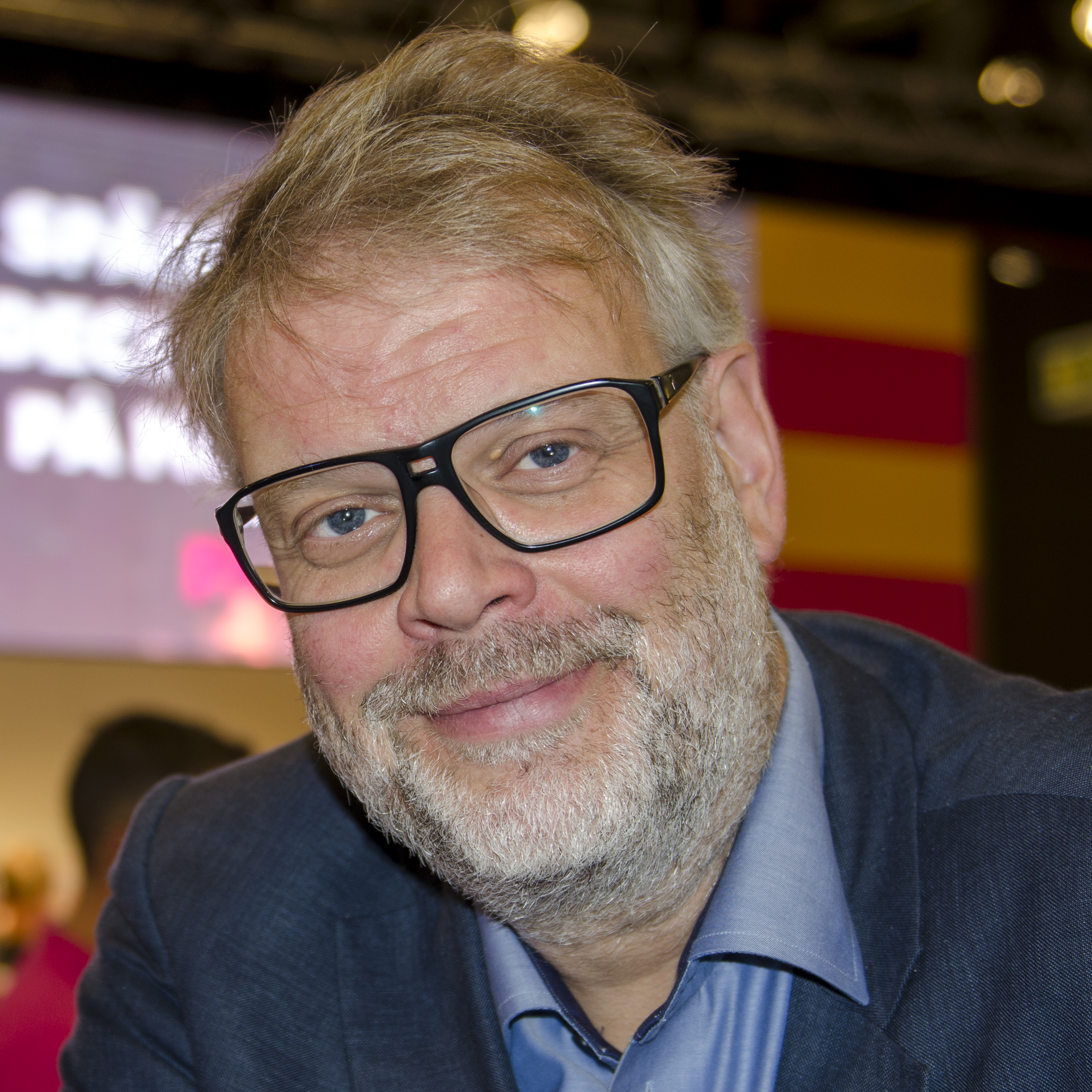
- Hans Rosenfeldt during the Gothenburg Book Fair in September 2014
- Born: 1964 (age 61–62); Borås, Sweden
- Occupations: Screenwriter, radio presenter, novelist, actor
- Notable work: The Bridge; Marcella

Hans Rosenfeldt (born Hans Petersson; 1964) is a Swedish screenwriter, radio presenter, novelist and actor. He co-created the Swedish series De drabbade (2003) and Oskyldigt dömd (2008–09), and created the Scandinavian series The Bridge (2011–2018), and the ITV/Netflix series Marcella (2016–2021).

== Early life and education ==
Hans Petersson was born in 1964 in Borås, Västergötland. He took on the surname Rosenfeldt – his mother's maiden name – during school, replacing his birth name. He grew particularly tall during puberty and was treated with growth hormone at 14 years old to limit his growth. He reached his full height of 2.06 metres (6 ft 9 in) at 14.

He considered a career as a basketball player, and briefly worked as a sea lion trainer at Borås djurpark. He also had jobs as a chauffeur and a teacher before deciding to become an actor.

== Career ==
Rosenfeldt began acting in the late 1980s. In addition to small television roles, he acted with the Gothenburg National Theatre for five years, eventually realizing that he did not enjoy acting. Instead, he applied for a job at the radio program Glädjetåget and soon began writing for television, including the soap operas Rederiet and Tre kronor, in the 1990s.

As a radio personality, he has been a recurring panel member on Sveriges Radio P1's På Minuten for over a decade. He has also worked as a television presenter, hosting the game show Parlamentet from 2000 to 2003. In 2007, he co-wrote Sveriges Television's Christmas calendar, En riktig jul. He served briefly as an entertainment management at Sveriges Television, but did not feel suited to the role. Rosenfeldt hosted Sveriges Radio's winter program in 2009 and 2011; the story of the 2009 program was inspired by his mother's experience with dementia.

In 2006, Rosenfeldt was hired by the Swedish production company Filmlance International to create a crime series that was set in both Sweden and Denmark. The result was The Bridge, a Danish-Swedish co-production that focuses on a pair of detectives investigating a series of crimes that take place near the border of the two countries. The show's first season premiered in 2011 and its second season was aired in 2013. The Bridge was an international success, and spawned five adaptations, including The Bridge, set on the American-Mexican border, and The Tunnel, set on the British-French border.

Rosenfeldt and his friend Michael Hjorth have written a series of crime fiction novels which center around a forensic psychologist. Their first book, Det fördolda (The Secret), was released in 2010, while its sequel, Lärjungen (Disciple), was published in 2011. Together, they adapted the first two novels in the series into a television miniseries, Sebastian Bergman, which was broadcast in 2010.

Rosenfeldt wrote the English-language detective series Marcella, which premiered in 2016.

With Oskar Soderlund, Rosenfeldt co-wrote the 2024 Swedish Nordic noir TV series Cry Wolf (Vargasommar). The series, starring Eva Melander as officer Hannah Webster, was released on SBS On Demand in Australia in February 2025.

== Selected publications ==
Crime fiction novels co-authored by Rosenfeldt and Hjorth include:

- Dark Secrets, 2013 (Det fördolda, 2011)
- The Man Who Watched Women, 2015 (Lärjungen, 2012)
- The Man Who Wasn't There, 2016, (Fjällgraven, 2012)
- The Silent Girl, 2017 (Den stumma flickan, 2014)
- De Underkända, 2015
- En högre rättvisa, 2018
- Som Man Sår, 2021
- Skulden man bär, 2023

== Personal life ==
In 2014 Rosenfeldt was living in Täby, Stockholm County, with his wife Lotta. They have three children.
