= Burnin' (Cue song) =

1997 single by Cue

Single by Cue
- B-side: "Il fuoco" by Ernesto Targa (Italian edit)
- Released: 1997
- Length: 3:33
- Label: Pool Sounds; SVT
- Songwriter: Anders Melander
- Producer: Anders Melander

Cue singles chronology
"Burnin'" (1997)	"Crazy" (2000)

"Burnin'" is a song written and produced by Anders Melander, first released by Swedish music group Cue. The song was awarded a Grammis for "Song of the year 1997" (Swedish: Årets låt 1997), which was the first time a song performed in another language than Swedish won this award. The song was included on the band's self-titled album, which was released in 2000.

== History ==
Anders Melander was a composer working for the Swedish TV and a theatre director at Angeredsteatern. He was also much earlier a member in the progg band Nationalteatern. Niklas Hjulström on the other hand was an actor. The two had cooperated before working on a song and Anders knew Hjulström was a skilled singer. So when Anders needed a singer to sing "Burnin'", a song composed by him for the Swedish TV series Glappet, he asked Hjulström and they formed together a band called Cue.

Although not strictly intended for release as a hit, the song gained popularity and upon release as the first single for Cue, it spent four weeks at number one on the Swedish Singles Chart (14 November to 12 December 1997). It also reached number four in Norway and number nine in Finland.

== Charts ==
=== Weekly charts ===
Chart (1997–1998)	Peak position
Finland (Suomen virallinen lista)	9
Iceland (Íslenski Listinn Topp 40)	19
Norway (VG-lista)	4
Sweden (Sverigetopplistan)	1

=== Year-end charts ===
Chart (1997)	Rank
Sweden (Topplistan)	3

Chart (1998)	Rank
Sweden (Hitlistan)	81

== Certifications ==
Region	Certification	Certified units/sales
Norway (IFPI Norway)	Gold	
Sweden (GLF)	3× Platinum	90,000^{^}
^{^} Shipments figures based on certification alone.
