= Nina Frisk =

2007 Swedish comedy film

- Movie poster
- Directed by: Maria Blom
- Release date: 2007
- Country: Sweden
- Language: Swedish

Nina Frisk is a Swedish comedy film from 2007, written and directed by Maria Blom. Nina Frisk is an air hostess with a dysfunctional family that she tries to help.

== Actors ==
- Sofia Helin - Nina Frisk
- Daniel Götschenhjelm - Marcus
- Vilde Helmerson - William
- Sven Ahlström - Linus
- Gunilla Nyroos - Jill
- Urban Eldh - Krister
- Mia Poppe - Marika
- Emilio Riccardi - Mårten
- Emma Vävare - Sigrid
- Johan Ehn - Gunnar
- Lukas Loughran - Jens
- Gunnel Fred - Marie-Louise
- Mats Rudal - pilot
- Anja Landgré - Marika's mother
- Mikael Alsberg - Marika's dad
- Inga Landgré - Marika's grandmother
- Karin Örnmarker - honking lady
- Jannike Grut - the pilot's wife
- Daniel Sjöberg - football guy
- Susanne Claesson - Nina's colleague
- Tekla Granlund - Nina's colleague
- Cecilia Gustafsson - Nina's colleague
- Fredrik Rosman - Nina's colleague
