= Saxpartyfavoriter =

Compilation album by Ingmar Nordströms
- Released: 28 February 2007
- Genre: dansband music
- Length: 2 hours, 19 minutes
- Label: Frituna

Ingmar Nordströms chronology
På begäran (1998)	Saxpartyfavoriter (2007)	Fler Saxpartyfavoriter (2008)

Saxpartyfavoriter is a compilation album by Ingmar Nordströms, released 28 February 2007. The album consists of three newly-recorded songs, among them an instrumental version of "Gabriellas sång". Topping the Swedish albums chart, it became the band's first number-one album in Sweden, nearly 16 years following the mid-December 1991 band breakup.

== Track listing ==
1. Gabriellas sång
2. The Elephant Song
3. Stardust
4. I Just Called to Say I Love You
5. Can't smile without you
6. Ännu doftar kärlek
7. Vi möts igen
8. Over the Rainbow
9. Sound of Music
10. Dance in the Old-Fashioned Way
11. Chansson d'amour
12. Ein bisschen Frieden
13. Ballade pour Adeline
14. Lili Marlene
15. I Left My Heart in San Francisco
16. Låt det svänga (La det swinge)
17. Edelweiss
18. Smile
19. As Time Goes By
20. Moonlight Serenade
21. Guldet blev till sand
22. Gösta Gigolo (Schöner Gigolo, armer Gigolo)
23. Dag efter dag
24. Mot alla vindar
25. Power of Love
26. You Raise Me Up
27. Moon River
28. Café le Swing
29. O mein papa
30. In the Mood
31. En månskenspromenad
32. Scarlet Ribbons
33. Thore Ehrling
34. Only Love
35. Rara underbara Katarina
36. Tomelilla 6-5000
37. Melodi nostalgi
38. För alltid och evigt
39. What a Wonderful World
40. Vår sista dans

== Charts ==
Chart (2007)	Peak position
Sweden (Sverigetopplistan)	1
