= Gabriellas sång =

Single by Stefan Nilsson & Helen Sjöholm
- A-side: "Gabriellas sång"
- B-side: "Kraftverket"
- Released: 2004
- Songwriters: Stefan Nilsson and lyrics by Py Bäckman.

"Gabriellas sång" is a ballad song with music by Stefan Nilsson and lyrics by Py Bäckman. Recorded by Helen Sjöholm and Stefan Nilsson, the song charted at Svensktoppen for 68 weeks from 24 October 2004 to 5 February 2006, peaking at second position before leaving the chart. The song also became famous with the 2004 film As It Is in Heaven.

An instrumental recording by Swedish dansband Ingmar Nordströms appeared on the band's 2007 reunion compilation album Saxpartyfavoriter. Py Bäckman recorded the song on the 2008 album Sånger från jorden till himmelen.

In 2007 Molly Sandén performed the song during the Diggiloo tour. She also recorded the song as final track for the 2009 album Samma himmel. In 2009 Hanna Hedlund performed the song with her choir at Körslaget. Elisabeth Andreassen recorded the song for her 2009 album Spelleman.
