= The Man on the Balcony (film) =

- Directed by: Daniel Alfredson
- Screenplay by: Jonas Cornell; Daniel Alfredson
- Based on: The Man on the Balcony by Sjöwall and Wahlöö
- Produced by: Hans Lönnerheden
- Starring: Gösta Ekman; Kjell Bergqvist; Rolf Lassgård; Niklas Hjulström
- Cinematography: Peter Mokrosinski
- Music by: Stefan Nilsson
- Release date: 26 November 1993 (Sweden)
- Running time: 94 minutes
- Countries: Sweden; Germany
- Language: Swedish

The Man on the Balcony (Swedish: Mannen på balkongen, German: Der Mann auf dem Balkon) is a 1993 Swedish-German crime thriller film, based on the 1967 book The Man on the Balcony written by Maj Sjöwall and Per Wahlöö. This is the fourth film which stars Gösta Ekman as Martin Beck and Rolf Lassgård as Gunvald Larsson.

"Mannen på balkongen" has been considered as the best ever Martin Beck film starring Gösta Ekman, and Gösta Ekman became highly popular and regarded for his brilliant portrayal of Martin Beck in this picture by his fans. His fine performance also attracted several new fans to his side, and "The Man on the Balcony" was one of the most successful films in Sweden in the year of 1993.

== Plot ==
A mad serial killer terrorizes Stockholm in the hot summer of 1993, by abducting, raping and strangling young schoolgirls to death in the green parks of the inner town. When the first girl is found dead in the Vanadislunden Park, Martin Beck and his team are assigned the case and realize that this will become one of their most emotional investigations ever, especially for Beck's younger colleague Lennart Kollberg who himself has a little daughter. An old lady was robbed by an unknown robber in the park at the same time as the murder was committed, which means that Martin Beck must catch the robber first, as he is the only key witness.

== Cast ==
- Gösta Ekman as Martin Beck
- Kjell Bergqvist as Lennart Kollberg
- Rolf Lassgård as Gunvald Larsson
- Niklas Hjulström as Benny Skacke
- Tova Magnusson Norling as Putte Beck
- Jonas Falk as Stig-Åke Malm
- Bernt Ström as Einar Rönn
- Ulf Friberg as Åke Persson
- Ing-Marie Carlsson as Gun Kollberg
- Magdalena Ritter as Susanne Grassman
- Carl-Magnus Dellow as Policeman
- Michael Kausch as Fransson
- Udo Schenk as Miroslav Dragan
- Åsa Göransson as Lisbeth Karlström
- Monica Nielsen as Kiosk aunt
- Johanna Ström as Lena
- Ellen Swedenmark as Karin
- Christina Ådén as Eva
- Elias Ringqvist as Pelle
- Fredrik Ådén as Erik
- Maj Sjöwall as Teacher

== Awards ==
At the 29th Guldbagge Awards the film won the award for Best Screenplay (Daniel Alfredson, Jonas Cornell). It was also nominated for Best Film, Best Director (Alfredson) and Best Cinematography (Peter Mokrosinski).
