= Åsa Bjerkerot =

Swedish actress

Åsa Monica Sigurdsdotter Bjerkerot (born 12 May 1959, Bandhagen, Vantörs parish), is a Swedish actor, comedian, writer and film director. She has, among other things, been Annika's voice in the radio serial Tordyveln flyger i skymningen and Minnie Mouse's Swedish voice.

== Selected filmography ==
- Tuppen (1981)
- Charlie Strapp and Froggy Ball Flying High (Kalle Stropp och Grodan Boll på svindlande äventyr) (1991) (Voice of The Princess Cone Green)
