= Reine & Mimmi i fjällen! =

1997 Swedish comedy film

- Poster
- Directed by: Magnus Skogsberg
- Starring: Bertram Heribertson; Ing-Marie Carlsson; Mi Ridell; Per Graffman; Sanna Ekman; Sanna Bråding; Mercédesz Dinnyés; Tomas Norström
- Release date: 1997
- Running time: 98 minutes
- Country: Sweden
- Languages: Swedish, Russian

Reine & Mimmi i fjällen! is a Swedish comedy film released to cinemas on 15 August 1997. And is a film based on the TV-series Tre Kronor which was broadcast on TV4, and follows its two most popular characters Reine and Mimmi.

== Plot ==
Mimmi is tired of everything, her work obsessed husband Reine, her life and the sleepy town of Mälarviken. Mimmi gives Reine an ultimatum, either they go together on a vacation, or Mimmi go by herself threatening to not return. Reine books a skiing vacation to the Renhornet resort, believing it will give the couple a much needed calm time off. A gang of Russian robbers have other ideas.
