= Önskas =

1991 film

- Directed by: Lars Johansson
- Written by: Lars Johansson
- Produced by: Katinka Faragó
- Starring: Rolf Lassgård
- Cinematography: Lasse Björne
- Release date: 12 July 1991
- Running time: 74 minutes
- Country: Sweden
- Language: Swedish

Önskas is a 1991 Swedish comedy film directed by Lars Johansson. Rolf Lassgård was nominated for the award for Best Actor in a leading role at the 27th Guldbagge Awards.

== Cast ==
- Rolf Lassgård as Bo Roine 'Bosse' Persson
- Mattias Holstensson as Morgan
- Marie Richardson as Anita
- Camilla Asp as Katty
- Martin Svalander as Dag
- Per Morberg as Per-Arne Tegesjöö
- Linus Selldén as Karl Tegesjöö
- Gerd Hegnell as Mrs. Hansson
- Halvar Björk as Pfeiffer
- Kristina Ström as Alma
- Olof Holm as Bergström
