= Rolf Lassgård =

Swedish actor (born 1955)

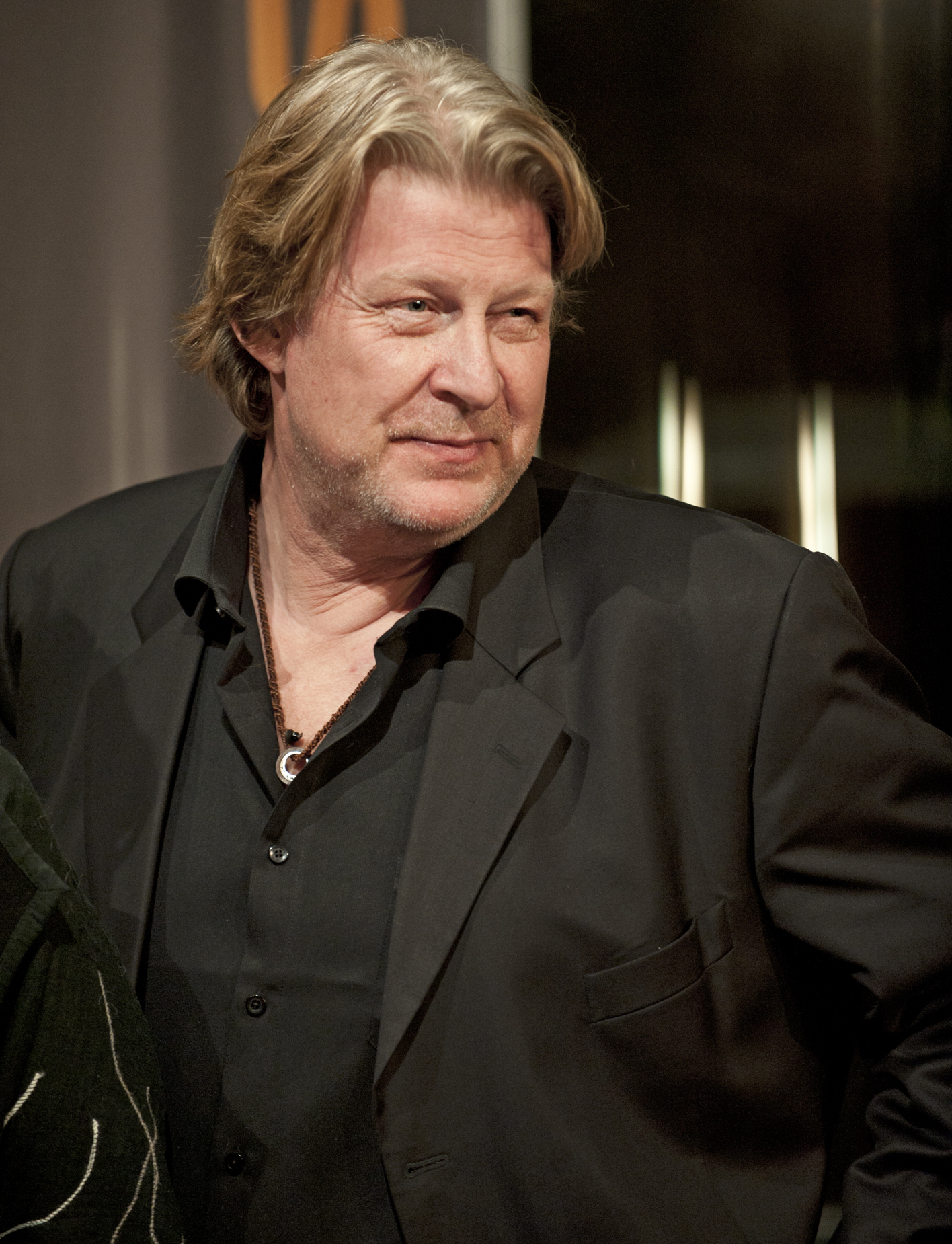
- Lassgård in 2009
- Born: Rolf Holger Lassgård; 29 March 1955 (age 71); Östersund, Sweden
- Occupation: Actor
- Spouse: Birgitta Lassgård (m. 1989; div. 2021)
- Children: 3

Rolf Holger Lassgård (born 29 March 1955) is a Swedish actor. He is known for his many roles in crime dramas.

== Life and career ==
Lassgård was born on 29 March 1955 in Östersund, Jämtland. A keen amateur ice hockey player in his youth, he also joined theatre teacher Ingemar Lind's Institute for the Performing Arts in the village of Storhögen outside Östersund. He then attended the National Swedish School of Acting from 1975 to 1978. There Lassgård met the director Peter Oskarson and joined his Skånska Teatern theatre company at Landskrona, where he remained for four years, making his first television appearance as "Puck" in its production of A Midsummer Night's Dream in 1980. Lassgård followed Oskarson to the Folkteatern company in Gävle in 1982, giving a series of highly acclaimed performances.

For his role in Önskas he was nominated for the award for Best Actor in a leading role at the 27th Guldbagge Awards. The following year he won the award at the 28th Guldbagge Awards for his role in Night of the Orangutan.

Lassgård had various small film roles, but his breakout role was Kjell-Åke Andersson's 1992 film Min store tjocke far ("My big fat father") for which he won the 1992 Guldbagge Award as best male actor. He has gone on to play in a wide range of roles in films, notably as policeman Gunvald Larsson in a series of films made in 1993–94, based on the Martin Beck novels, and starring Gösta Ekman, and as Kurt Wallander in the SVT TV-movie adaptations of the Henning Mankell novels from 1994 to 2007. Since then, he has also played a crime psychologist as the titular character in the crime drama television series Sebastian Bergman. From 2011 to 2015, Lassgård has appeared in Seasons 2, 3, and 4 of the TV Norwegian comedy series Dag, playing a free-thinking, free-wheeling therapist. In 2013 he starred in the crime series The Death of a Pilgrim, a dramatic retelling of the assassination of Olof Palme and fictionalised account of the discovery of his killer in the 2010s. He had the leading role as Ove in the 2015 film A Man Called Ove, which won him another Guldbagge Award for best male actor.

=== Personal life ===
Lassgård married actress Birgitta Lassgård in 1989; they had been a couple since 1982 and have three children. They divorced in 2021.

== Selected filmography ==
- 1991 - Önskas
- 1992 - Night of the Orangutan
- 1993 - Murder at the Savoy
- 1993 - Roseanna
- 1993 - The Fire Engine That Disappeared
- 1993 - The Man on the Balcony
- 1994 - Mördare utan ansikte (Faceless Killers)
- 1994 - The Police Murderer
- 1994 - Stockholm Marathon
- 1995 - Hundarna i Riga (The Dogs of Riga)
- 1996 - Den vita lejoninnan (The White Lioness)
- 1998 - Under the Sun
- 1996 - The Hunters
- 1999 - Tarzan (as the Swedish voice of Clayton)
- 2001 - Villospår (Sidetracked)
- 2002 - Den 5:e kvinnan (The Fifth Woman)
- 2003 - Mannen som log (The Man Who Smiled)
- 2005 - Steget efter (One Step Behind)
- 2006 - Brandvägg (Firewall)
- 2006 - After the Wedding
- 2007 - Pyramiden (The Pyramid)
- 2008 - De gales hus
- 2009 - Storm
- 2010 - Bella Block - Das schwarze Fenster
- 2011 - The Hunters 2
- 2012 - Sebastian Bergman
- 2013 - The Death of a Pilgrim
- 2014 - Another Time, Another Life
- 2015 - A Man Called Ove
- 2016 - The Lion Woman
- 2017 - Downsizing
- 2018 - Jägarna (The Hunters)
- 2019 - The Spy
- 2020 - Min Pappa Marianne (My Father Marianne)
- 2023 - Blackwater
- 2024 - Whiskey on the Rocks
- 2026- Summer of 1985
