= De drabbade =

Swedish television series

- Genre: Drama
- Written by: Hans Rosenfeldt
- Directed by: Måns Mårlind
- Starring: see below
- Country of origin: Sweden
- Original languages: Swedish, Norwegian, Danish, Finnish, Scottish Gaelic, English
- No. of seasons: 1
- No. of episodes: 12

Production
- Cinematography: Kurt Berggren; Andreas Wessberg
- Running time: 60 min (12 episodes); 89 min (Television Pilot)

Original release
- Network: Sveriges television
- Release: 28 September – 14 December 2003

De drabbade (The Befallen in English) is a 2003 Swedish TV series. It was partly inspired by the Danish television series De udvalgde from 2001, but has even more been the inspiration for the American TV series Heroes.

== Plot summary ==
A supernatural force sweeps over Scandinavia and Finland, causing all satellite and radar facilities to stop working for a duration of 6 seconds. During this time certain people get affected by the force and receive different kind of supernatural capacities, as their weaknesses are turned into their greatest asset. One by one they are recruited to one of two sides in an upcoming battle between light and darkness. The two groups are led by The Bright Lady and The Dark Lady. All are in danger as the Hunter seeks to hunt them down one by one. After both groups have formed (the Baby-girl is believed to be dead, but is found alive in some fishermen's net, having spent months in the cold water of the Bothnian Bay), all affected in both camps begin to amplify their skills, and it is assumed to be some kind of war between the two groups. However this is not the case.

The Bright Lady eventually turns out to be just another side of the Dark Lady. All affected in the bright group are put to sleep by their trusted leader through a magical spell, then as the Hunter shoots them in their sleep, their capabilities comes into the Bright Lady. The same destiny awaits the dark ones, however a man that can read other's thoughts suspects foul play, and a few of the dark ones run away from the Dark Lady, together with the strongest of all the affected. A six or seven months old baby-girl, known as The Balancer of Power.

The escaping group manages to find the journalist, that during each episode has found out more and more about what is about to happen. The two ladies will fight each other, and the winner will then destroy planet Earth as we know it (in some kind of Armageddon). In the final countdown, the little remaining group must try to find out what supernatural capability the baby, or The Balancer of Power, actually has before the Dark Lady arrives. But as the "mind reader" attempts to read the mind of the baby, he only discovers that she does not like water - but there is a certain smell that she longs for. Then the baby gets to strong "to be read". And at the second attempt the "mindreader" simply dies, but before he dies, he explains that the smell the baby longs for, is the smell of her dead mother.

=== Some of the characters ===
Bright side:

- Charlotte Wangler - can bring dead back to life (animals as well as humans).
- Arne - can become invisible.
- Leif - can tell the precise location of anyone.
- Marika (and Tommie's wife) - if hit, the force strikes back on the attacker (becomes also stronger after each attempt to hurt her).
- Åke - can scare anyone with their deepest fears.

Dark side:

- Tommie - can read others' thoughts.
- Jasmine - she cannot change what people want to do, but yet they follow any order she gives; she is considered the most dangerous.
- Ismael - can look like anyone else.
- Elisabeth - can use doors as a portal to any place in the world that has a door.

Others:

- Göran Stein - regardless of what a person wants to tell, all people tell him the truth, as they know it. Göran Stein becomes the first victim of the Hunter, before he had joined side. (His capability is hence lost for both the Dark and the Bright Lady.)
- Henrik Modin - can see the future. Henrik Modin saw what was about to happen and it was so terrible that he chose to kill his own family and then commit suicide when the leader of the light side came to get him (his capability is hence lost for both the Dark and the Bright Lady).
- Moa, The Balancer of Power, the baby-girl. Capability unknown until last episode. Her capability first appears worthless (even if she had been adult). But her capability to be able to turn back time actually fits the logical solution.

=== Themes ===
Characters are faced with the choice to use their new powers for good or bad.

== Cast ==
- David Hayman as a witch-hunting priest
- Eric Ericson as Joakim Modin
- Lia Boysen as Leader of light and Leader of darkness
- Eva Röse as Jasmine Thornwall
- Magnus Krepper as Åke Svensk
- Paprika Steen as Charlotte Wangler
- Sven-Åke Gustavsson as Arne Millgren
- Lotta Karlge as Anna-Lena Ångerman
- Kjell Bergqvist as Göran Stein

and

- Marit Andreassen as Marika
- Ingrid Henderson as Adelyn
- Niklas Hjulström as Henrik Modin
- Hallvard Holmen as Tommie
- Omid Khansari as Ismael Ebrahimi
- Sten Ljunggren as Walter

== Production ==
The character of the prophet Adelyn Saville (and web pages) was created for the series. In a buzz marketing campaign SVT sent out a letter containing a question "Är du drabbad?" and medallions covered in a blood like substance. In the letter there was also an address to a webpage.

The summer before the series premiered, head writer Hans Rosenfeldt said he would talk about Adelyn in his episode of Sommar.
