= Daniel Alfredson =

Swedish film director (born 1959)

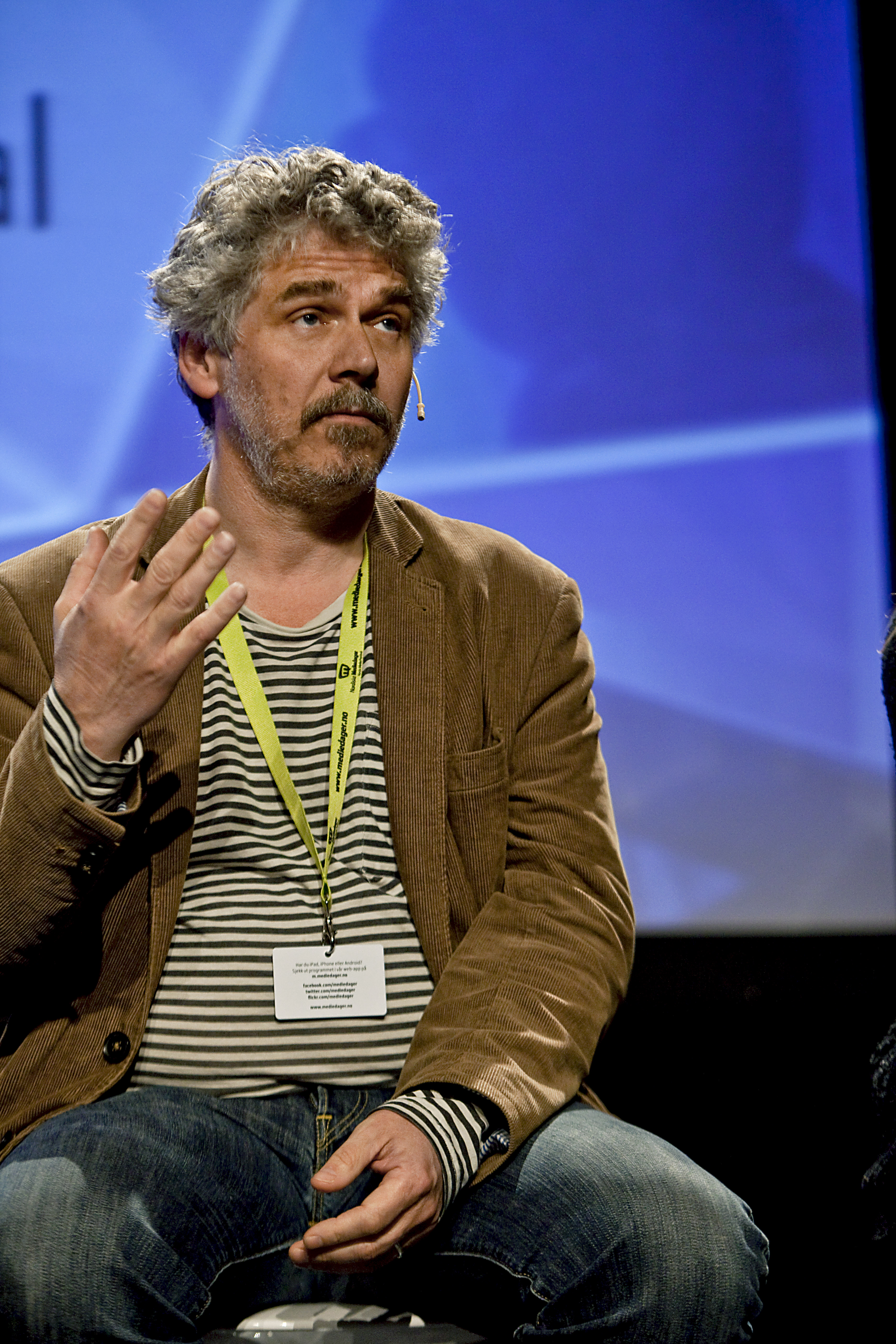
- Alfredson at The Nordic Media Festival, Bergen, May 2011.
- Born: Hans Daniel Björn Alfredson; 23 May 1959 (age 66); Stockholm, Sweden
- Occupation: Film director
- Father: Hans Alfredson
- Relatives: Tomas (brother)

Hans Daniel Björn Alfredson (born 23 May 1959 in Stockholm, Sweden) is a Swedish film director who is best known for directing film versions of two parts of the Millennium Trilogy: The Girl Who Played with Fire and The Girl Who Kicked the Hornets' Nest. At the 29th Guldbagge Awards he won the award for Best Screenplay and was nominated for Best Director for the film The Man on the Balcony. In 2015 his film Blackway starring Anthony Hopkins, Julia Stiles and Ray Liotta was released.

He is the older brother of Tomas Alfredson (director of Let the Right One In and Tinker Tailor Soldier Spy) and the son of Hasse Alfredson.

== Filmography ==
- Roseanna (1993)
- The Man on the Balcony (1993)
- Den täta elden (1995)
- En fri mand (1996)
- Tic Tac (1997)
- Rymd (1998)
- Straydogs (1999)
- Dödsklockan (1999)
- 10:10 (2000)
- Syndare i sommarsol (2001)
- Wolf (2008)
- The Girl Who Played with Fire (2009)
- The Girl Who Kicked the Hornets' Nest (2009)
- Odjuret (2012)
- Echoes from the Dead (2013)
- Kidnapping Freddy Heineken (2015)
- Blackway (2015)
- Intrigo: Death of an Author (2018)
- Intrigo: Samaria (2019)
- Intrigo: Dear Agnes (2019)
