= The Visitors (1988 film) =

- Directed by: Joakim Ersgård
- Written by: Patrik Ersgård, Joakim Ersgård
- Produced by: Håkan Ersgård
- Starring: Kjell Bergqvist; Lena Endre
- Release date: 29 April 1988
- Running time: 1 hour, 49 minutes
- Country: Sweden
- Language: Swedish

The Visitors (Swedish: Besökarna) is a 1988 Swedish horror film directed by Joakim Ersgård.

== Plot ==
Frank, Sara and their two children have recently moved into the house of their dreams on the Swedish countryside. Frank is disturbed by mysterious sounds and something tears down the wallpaper from the walls. He contacts a ghost-hunter, Allan. While conducting an experiment, Allan is killed, and Frank has to find out the truth himself. What's so special with the mysterious room in the attic?

== Cast ==
- Kjell Bergqvist - Frank
- Lena Endre - Sara
- Johannes Brost - Allan
- Joanna Berglund - Lotta
- Jonas Olsson - Peter
- Patrik Ersgård - Letter deliverer
- Bernt Lundquist - Civilian police officer
- Lena Lindblom - Supermarket cashier
- P.G. Hylén - Roadblock police officer
