= Du Pappa =

- Directed by: René Bjerke
- Starring: Håkon Bolstad; Benedikte Lindbeck; Nils Ole Oftebro
- Cinematography: Peter Mokrosinski
- Distributed by: Norsk Film
- Release date: 4 March 1994
- Language: Norwegian

Du Pappa (English title Daddy Blue) is a 1994 Norwegian film about a teenage boy and his troublesome relationship with his dad and with a girl he befriends while running away from home on a small sailboat.

== Synopsis ==
Sixteen-year-old LP (Håkon Bolstad) has just graduated from junior high school. He lives in Oslo, the only child of a middle-class couple. Wanting to get away from his parents, he steals a sailboat, vaguely envisioning looking up a girl he once knew a bit down the Oslofjord. Not knowing how to sail, he almost crashes into a pier when the stunningly beautiful Line (Benedikte Lindbeck) rescues him. She jumps on board and joins LP on his journey. LP is sullen and withdrawn; however, the confident and well-versed girl thaws him as they continue on their sunny escapade of the Oslofjord archipelago. Then LP's father (played by seasoned Norwegian leading actor Nils Ole Oftebro) appears and demands an end to the adventure. LP is determined not to submit to his father's authority, leading dad to board the boat and join the young couple. A battle of wills ensues between the father and his equally stubborn offspring. Neither has really learned to know the other, and Line becomes the catalyst through which each realizes new aspects of the other.

== Awards ==
The film won the Grand Jury Prize, Press Award and award for Best Actress at the 1994 Rouen Nordic Film Festival. At the Rencontre Cinematographique in Cannes the film received the Grand Prix.
