= Lejontämjaren =

2003 film

- Directed by: Manne Lindwall
- Written by: Unlimited Stories
- Produced by: Joakim Hansson; Johan Fälemark; Peter Hiltunen; Peter Possne
- Music by: Alex Svensson-Metés; Bengt Nilsson
- Release date: 7 February 2003 (Sweden)
- Running time: 92 minutes
- Country: Sweden
- Language: Swedish

Lejontämjaren (The Lion Tamer) is a Swedish film which was released to cinemas in Sweden on 7 February 2003, directed by Manne Lindwall.

== Plot ==
Simon is 9 years old and at school he's mobbed by an 11-year-old boy and his gang. Simon dreams that he tames a lion which helps him with scaring the bad boy who Simon calls "Kobran" ("The Cobra"). One night Simon sees a naked man with briefs on his head and hears his mother's laugh in the background.

The next morning Karin tells Simon that she had a friend at home during the night. In school during the lunch time he tells his mate Tove about his mother and the "briefs-man" whose real name is Björn. At same time "Kobran" and his gang come to their table; he requests Simon to go and get milk and when Simon does it he spits in Simon's food. The other boys laugh but Tove is angry and throws her milk on "Kobran"'s face and she and Simon escapes into the headmaster's room.

At the evening Björn comes to Simon's home and has a dinner with him and Karin. He tells that he has a son called Alex who is studying in Simon's school, but he doesn't know that Alex and "Kobran" is the same person. Björn behaves sillily and Simon goes away into his room, but Björn follows him. When he sees Simon's lion posters on the walls, he tells Simon that he has seen real lions in Africa. Then Simon becomes happy and asks if he can protect him well; he "can't protect him from lions but from other things".

The next time Björn brings his son Alex to the dinner and then Simon understands that it's Alex who is "Kobran". First Alex is nice but later he is angry and attacks Simon and forces him to fix that it won't be any "relationship" between Björn and Karin.

The next day Simon and Tove write a letter where they pretend that Karin wants to revoke the relationship with Björn, and Simon puts it in Björn's pocket when they meet, but Karin denies that she wrote it.

Simon knows that Alex'll abuse him if he can't fix it. Alex and Björn move and live together with Simon and Karin.

Tove wants Simon to tell Karin, but Simon doesn't want and then Tove have an idea; later they tell about Björn and Karin for Simon's grandmother, Karin's mother, and she tells Simon to follow Tove to her home so she alone can go home and talk to Karin. When Simon comes home at the evening, everything is fine, except that grandma is not welcome home in the future because "she interferes Karin's private life". Someone calls but there's no answer. Björn thinks it's Anna, Alex' mother who hasn't met her son. Björn goes to her home and tells her that Alex is angry to her and she must stop calling.

A few days later at school "Kobran" and his gang attack Simon. Grandma sees that he has been abused and he lies and says that Björn did it. Then Karin is angry and forces Alex and Björn out from her home.

The harassments are over, but Simon is sad and in the end he tells Karin that Alex did it, they go to Björn's home and Alex confesses. They move back to Karin's home. One evening Björn tries to fix a CD player and tells the boys to be careful with the electric wires of the CD player; "they'll hurt if you touch them". When Simon sleeps during the night, Alex sneaks into his room and hurts him with the wires so he screams, but when Björn and Karin come, Alex pretends sleeping.

Björn, Alex and Simon go to a little fishing lodge and sleep there. Alex is angry when he knows that Simon has got a lion tooth from Björn. The next morning when they wake up, Björn isn't there. Then Alex starts harassing Simon and destroys the lion tooth, and then Simon becomes angrily mad; he throws a chair in Alex' head and runs after him out to the forest.

At home, Björn and Karin wanted to be in family but now they stop that idea. Simon tells Alex that he can't hate his mother for life and together they go to Anna's home. When they're back, Alex doesn't want to tell that they met his mother but Simon says that if they do it together it'll be fine. Here Simon goes to his lion and says "Hejdå. Nu behöver jag inte dig längre" ("Goodbye. Now I don't need you more.").

== Cast ==
- Eric Lager as Simon
- Lisa Lindgren as Karin, Simon's mother
- Magnus Krepper as Björn
- Linus Nord as Alex ("Kobran")
- Ebba Wickman as Tove
- Irma Erixson as Simon's grandmother
- Mirja Turestedt as Anna, Alex' mother
- André Holmdahl as Danne
- Adin Jasarevic as Peter
