= Sebastian Bergman =

2010 Swedish crime television series

- Also known as: Den fördömde
- Genre: Serial crime drama, thriller
- Written by: Michael Hjorth; Hans Rosenfeldt
- Directed by: Daniel Espinosa; Michael Hjorth
- Starring: Rolf Lassgård; Gunnel Fred; Tomas Laustiola; Moa Silén; Christopher Wagelin
- Composers: Philippe Boix-Vives; Jon Ekstrand
- Country of origin: Sweden
- Original language: Swedish
- No. of seasons: 2
- No. of episodes: 4

Production
- Executive producers: Stefan Baron; Klaus Bassiner; Wolfgang Feindt; Michael Hjorth; Peter Nadermann
- Producer: Henrik Widman
- Cinematography: Erik Molberg Hansen
- Running time: 90 minutes

Original release
- Network: SVT1
- Release: 25 December – 26 December 2010

Sebastian Bergman (original title Den fördömde, literally "The cursed one") is a Swedish police procedural television series, based on two novels by duo Michael Hjorth and Hans Rosenfeldt. It stars Rolf Lassgård as the eponymous hero, a criminal profiler with personal problems. It was originally broadcast on Swedish television in 2010, and a subtitled version was shown on the UK's BBC Four in 2012.

Bergman is an experienced psychologist who, at the start of the series, has effectively retired from police work. With a reputation as a womaniser, he has for some years been recovering from the loss of his wife and child in the 2004 Indian Ocean earthquake and tsunami. A chance encounter with a former police colleague, Torkel Höglund (Tomas Laustiola), results in his being taken on as a consultant to assist in a murder case. Bergman at first gets on badly with the young female detective Vanya (Moa Silén) with whom he has to work, and is subsequently shocked to discover that she is his illegitimate daughter from a relationship he has almost forgotten. Seeing this as an opportunity to make up for the death of his daughter (for which he blames himself), he slowly begins to rebuild his career.

On 7 November 2014 the series began streaming, with English subtitles, on the MHZ network, beginning with "Dark Secrets" on rotation with their other nightly selection of international mysteries.
