= People's Theatre =

People's Theatre may refer to:

- Folkan, a former theatre in Stockholm, Sweden
- Folkteatern, Gothenburg, Sweden
- Folkteatern i Gävleborg, Sweden
- Folketeatret, Copenhagen, Denmark
- Folketeateret, Oslo, Norway
- Mansudae People's Theatre, in Pyongyang, North Korea
- Ludowy Theatre, Kraków, Poland
- People's Theatre, Newcastle upon Tyne, England
- Volksbühne, Berlin, Germany
- Volkstheater, Vienna, Austria

== See also ==
- Indian People's Theatre Association
