= Gunilla Nyroos =

Swedish actress (born 1945)

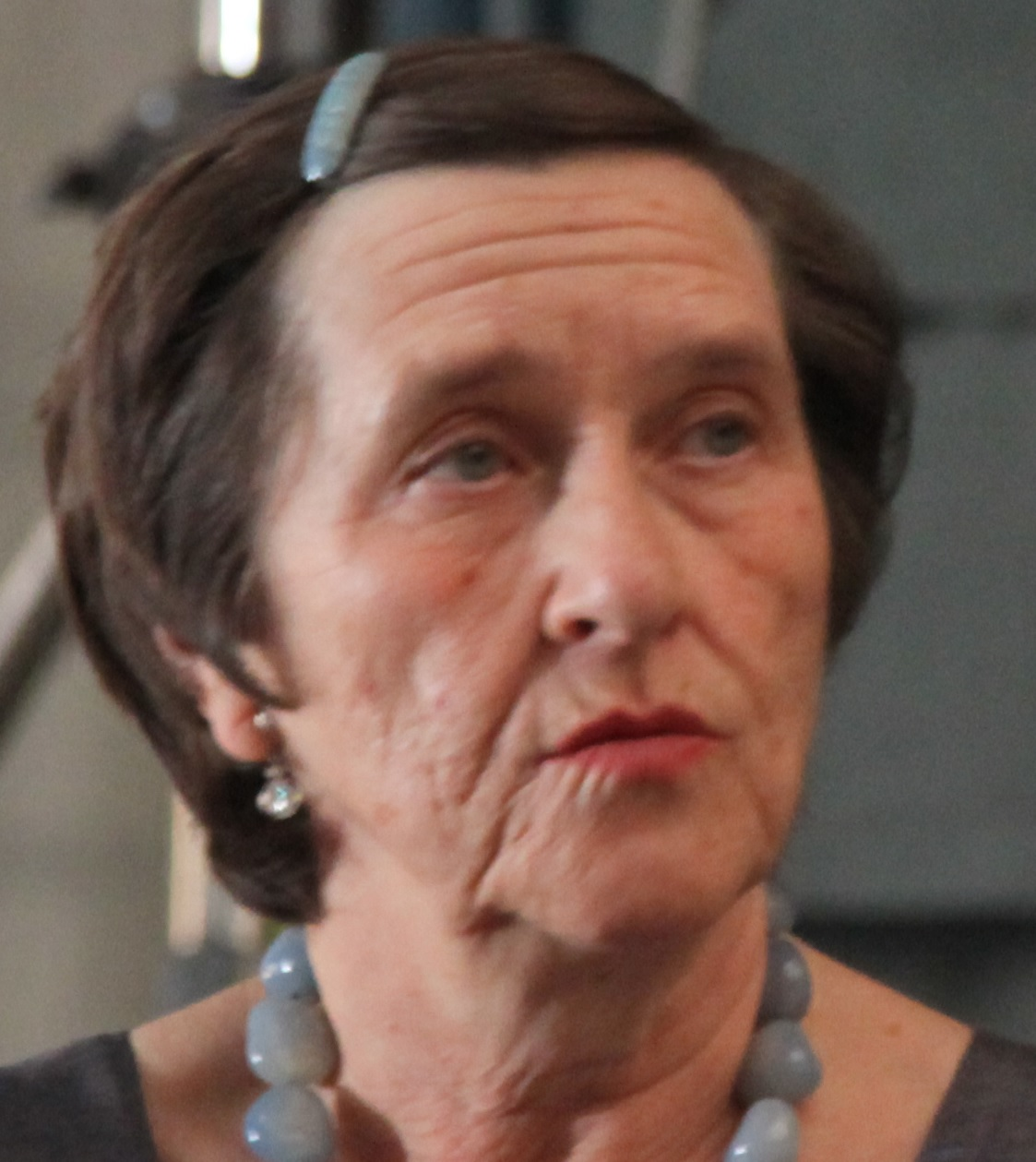
- Gunilla Nyroos in 2012.
- Born: Gunilla Birgitta Nyroos; 7 October 1945 (age 80); Vaasa, Finland
- Occupation: Actress
- Spouse: Lennart Hjulström (m. 2007)
- Children: Hanna Nyroos

Gunilla Birgitta Nyroos (born 7 October 1945) is a Swedish actress.

== Life and career ==
She won the award for Best Actress at the 20th Guldbagge Awards for her role in A Hill on the Dark Side of the Moon.

In the autumn 2008, she participated in Blommor av stål at Vasateatern in Stockholm, together with Pernilla August, Suzanne Reuter, Melinda Kinnaman, Cecilia Nilsson and Linda Ulvaeus.

Nyroos is married to Lennart Hjulström. Together they have a daughter Hanna Nyroos.

== Filmography ==
- 2010 – Sissela och dödssynderna
- 2007 – Nina Frisk (2007)
- 1996 – Rusar i hans famn (1996)
- 1992 – The Emperor of Portugallia (1992)
- 1991 – The Best Intentions
- 1989 – Tre kärlekar
- 1987 – Nionde kompaniet (1987)
- 1987 – Mio in the Land of Faraway (1987)
- 1986 – Moa
- 1983 – A Hill on the Dark Side of the Moon (1983)
- 1977 – Jack
- 1976 – Raskens
- 1973 – Om 7 flickor
- 1971 – Hem till byn
