= Niklas Hjulström =

Swedish actor

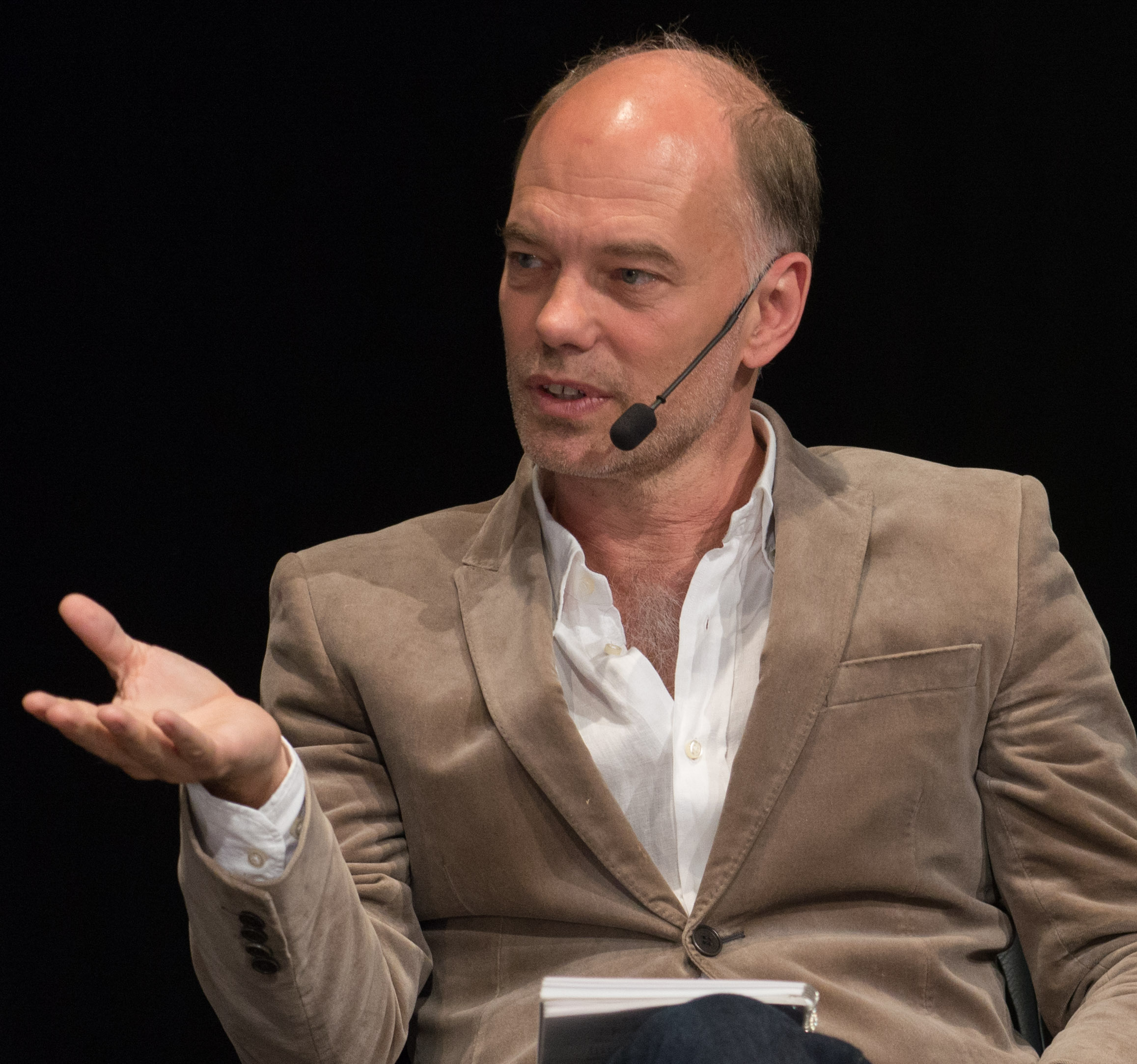
- Hjulström in 2015.
- Born: Niklas Lennart Hjulström; 15 February 1962 (age 64); Mölndal, Sweden
- Occupations: Actor, singer
- Years active: 1990–present
- Spouse: Ann-Christin Andersson (m. 1993–2009)
- Parent(s): Lennart Hjulström; Ulla Söderdal
- Relatives: Carin Hjulström (sister); Fredrik Hjulström (brother); Hanna Nyroos (half sister); Filip Hjulström (grandfather)

Niklas Hjulström (born 15 February 1962) is a Swedish actor, singer and director. He is brother to Carin Hjulström, grandson to Filip Hjulström and son to Lennart Hjulström.

Hjulström was born in Mölndal, Sweden, and finished his education in 1990 at NAMA in Stockholm. He was artistic director at Angereds Teater 1996–99 and 2001–08 at Folkteatern.

As singer, Hjulström is member in the pop duo Cue.

== Selected direction ==
- 2002–04 – Simon and the Oaks (Folkteatern)
- 2008 – Tre kärlekar (Folkteatern)

== Selected filmography ==
- 1992 – Svart Lucia
- 1993 – Roseanna
- 1993 – Brandbilen som försvann
- 1993 – Polis polis potatismos!
- 1993 – Mannen på balkongen
- 1994 – Stockholm Marathon
- 1994 – Tre kronor
- 2001 – Deadline
- 2003 – Paradiset
- 2003 – De drabbade
- 2003 – Swedenhielms
- 2005 – Orka! Orka!
- 2007 – Isprinsessan
- 2007 – Predikanten
- 2009 – The Girl Who Kicked the Hornets' Nest
- 2009 – Stenhuggaren
- 2010 – Olycksfågeln
