= Bertram Heribertson =

Swedish actor and director (born 1955)

Bertram Heribertson (born 11 November 1955) is a Swedish actor and director, known for his work in film, television and on stage.

He is noted for his lead role in the Swedish television series Tre Kronor as Reine, one of the series' main characters. He has appeared on stage in such performances as Christina Gottfridsson's Hamlätt, a comedic retelling of Hamlet, and the Ystad Portrait Theatre's Sitt still i båten, which takes place on an actual ship anchored in a fiord. He is also noted for directing theater productions, such as Det måste ju va nåt som inte är fel, a monologue about Asperger syndrome.

== Filmography ==
- S*M*A*S*H (1990) (TV)
- Nyhetsmorgon (1994) (TV)
- Tre Kronor (1994–1997) (TV series)
- Sen kväll med Luuk (1997) (TV)
- Reine & Mimmi i fjällen! (1997)
- Den 5:e kvinnan (2002) (TV mini-series)
- In Sweden Everybody Can Swim (2002)
- Ørnen: En krimi-odyssé (2004–2006) (TV)
