= A Hill on the Dark Side of the Moon =

1983 film

- Directed by: Lennart Hjulström
- Written by: Agneta Pleijel
- Produced by: Bert Sundberg
- Starring: Gunilla Nyroos
- Cinematography: Sten Holmberg
- Release date: 22 October 1983
- Running time: 96 minutes
- Country: Sweden
- Language: Swedish

A Hill on the Dark Side of the Moon (Swedish: Berget på månens baksida) is a 1983 Swedish drama film about the life of the Russian mathematician Sofia Kovalevskaya, written by Agneta Pleijel and directed by Lennart Hjulström. Gunilla Nyroos won the award for Best Actress at the 20th Guldbagge Awards.

== Cast ==
- Bibi Andersson as Ann-Charlotte Leffler
- Thommy Berggren as Maxim Kovalevskij
- Roland Hedlund as Anton
- Gerd Hegnell as Martha Mittag-Leffler
- Ingvar Hirdwall as Gustaf Edgren
- Gunilla Nyroos as Sonja Kovalevskij
- Lina Pleijel as Foufa Kovaevskij
- Birgitta Ulfsson as Greta
- Iwar Wiklander as Gösta Mittag-Leffler

== See also ==
- List of films about mathematicians
- Sofia Kovalevskaya (film) — a biographical television miniseries
