= Cue (band) =

Swedish musical duo

Cue is a Swedish pop duo group made up of musician Anders Melander and Niklas Hjulström. They have topped the Swedish Singles Chart with "Burnin'".

Anders Melander was a composer working for the Swedish TV and a theatre director at Angeredsteatern. He was also much earlier a member in the progg band Nationalteatern. Niklas Hjulström on the other hand was an actor. The two had cooperated before working on a song and Anders knew Hjulström was a skilled singer. So when Anders needed a singer to sing "Burnin'", a song composed by him for the Swedish TV series "Glappet", he asked Hjulström and they formed together a band called Cue.

Although not strictly intended for release as a hit, just usage for the TV series, the song gained popularity and upon release as the first single for Cue, it hit the Swedish charts at #1 for 4 weeks (14 November to 12 December 1997. It eventually sold 90,000 copies making it one of the most successful singles in the 1990s in Sweden. It also reached #4 in Norway and #9 in Finland.

When Hjulström's work at Angeredsteatern ended, it was an opportune time for the duo to release in 2000 their first album Cue and a second single from the album entitled "Crazy".

A second album followed in 2006 entitled Guide in Blue where both Anders Melander and Niklas Hjulström wrote songs.

Eventually Cue became more of a Hjulström solo project besides his new work as director and art leader at the theatre Folkteatern.

== Discography ==
=== Albums ===
Year	Title	Chart positions
Year	Title	SWE
2000	Cue	8
2006	Guide in Blue	24

=== Singles ===
Year	Title	Chart positions			
Year	Title	SWE	NOR	FIN	NLD
1997	Burnin'	1	4	9	-
2000	Crazy	9	14	-	-
2000	Sway	-	-	-	-
2002	Hello	-	-	-	85
2006	Take Me Home	38	-	-	-
2011	Stay	-	-	-	-
2012	Don't Wanna Lie	-	-	-	-
