= Nils Ole Oftebro =

Norwegian actor and illustrator (born 1944)

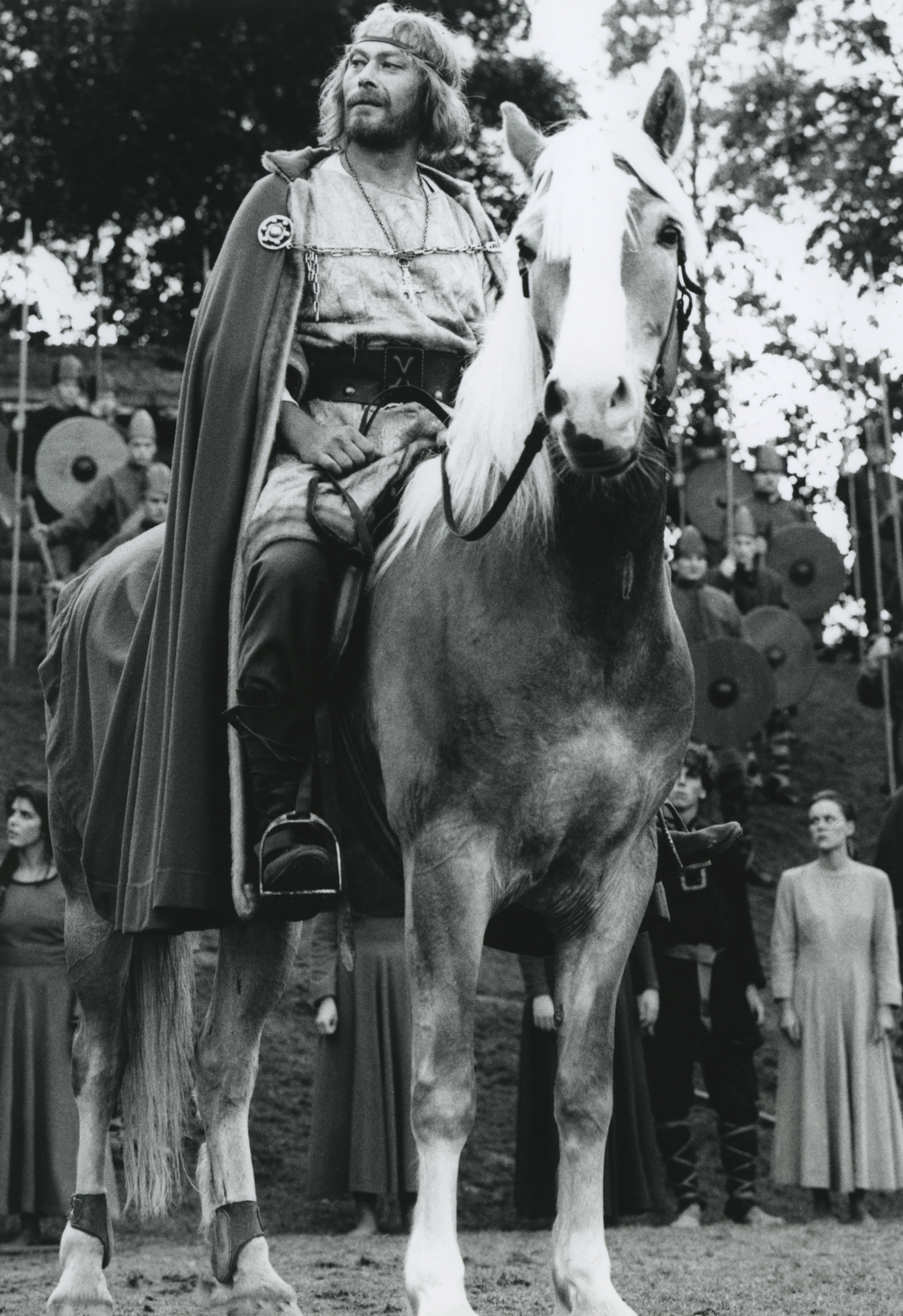
- Oftebro in the role of King Olaf II of Norway in The Saint Olav Drama at Stiklestad in 1992
- Born: 1 December 1944 (age 81); Sarpsborg, Norway
- Occupations: Actor and illustrator
- Years active: 1971–present
- Spouse: Anette Hoff
- Children: Jakob Oftebro

Nils Ole Oftebro (born 1 December 1944) is a Norwegian actor and illustrator. He was born in Sarpsborg. He worked for Fjernsynsteatret from 1969 to 1971. From 1971 he was assigned to Nationaltheatret. He was artistical director at Torshovteatret from 1987 to 1989. He received the Amanda Award for "Best Actor" in 1986, for his role in the television production Du kan da ikke bare gå, and in 1998 for "Best Supporting Role" in Thranes metode. Among his films are Du Pappa, Dagny and Blood of the Railroad Workers.

His dubbing work includes Jafar in Aladdin, the Grand Duke of Owls in Rock-a-Doodle, Tim Lockwood in Cloudy with a Chance of Meatballs and Stinky Pete the Prospector in Toy Story 2.

He is best known to international audiences for his appearances in the Swedish drama series Black Lake.

At the 2024 Norwegian International Film Festival he was honored with a stone at the Haugesund Walk of Fame, along with Renate Reinsve.
