= Bernt Ström =

Swedish actor

- Born: Bernt Valter Ström; 6 March 1940; Säter, Sweden
- Died: 31 August 2009 (aged 69); Luleå, Sweden

Bernt Valter Ström (6 March 1940 in Säter, Sweden–31 August 2009 in Luleå, Sweden) was a Swedish actor.

Ström studied at Skara Skolscen and at NAMA in Stockholm. He was under a long time engaged at Norrbottensteatern.

== Selected filmography ==
- Badjävlar (1971)
- Lasse liten (1974)
- Bomsalva (1978)
- Lyftet (1978)
- Den enes död (1980)
- 1983 – Profitörerna
- Sommarens tolv månader (1988)
- 1993 – The Man on the Balcony
- Glädjekällan (1993)
- 1993 – Murder at the Savoy
- Roseanna (1993)
- 1993 – The Fire Engine That Disappeared
- Petri tårar (1995)
