= Murder at the Savoy (film) =

1993 film by Per Berglund

- Directed by: Pelle Berglund
- Screenplay by: Pelle Berglund; Jonas Cornell
- Based on: Murder at the Savoy by Sjöwall and Wahlöö
- Produced by: Hans Lönnerheden
- Starring: Gösta Ekman; Kjell Bergqvist; Rolf Lassgård; Niklas Hjulström
- Cinematography: Tony Forsberg
- Edited by: Carina Hellberg
- Music by: Stefan Nilsson
- Release dates: 6 October 1993 (Sweden); 29 April 1994 (Sweden Kanal 1)
- Running time: 91 minutes
- Countries: Sweden; Germany
- Language: Swedish

Murder at the Savoy (Swedish: Polis, polis, potatismos) is a Swedish/German film from 1993, based on the 1970 book Murder at the Savoy.

== Plot ==
A famous industrialist is killed at a restaurant in Malmö. When the police inspector Martin Beck in Stockholm gets the case, it is revealed that the industrialist is possibly involved in illegal arms deals. The police have only one question to answer: Who was the biggest criminal, the murderer or the industrialist?

== Cast ==
- Gösta Ekman as Martin Beck
- Kjell Bergqvist as Lennart Kollberg
- Rolf Lassgård as Gunvald Larsson
- Niklas Hjulström as Benny Skacke
- Ingvar Andersson as Per Månsson
- Arthur Brauss as Jürgen Hoffman
- Lena Nilsson as Åsa Thorell
- Andrea Heuer as Hanna Mohr
- Tommy Johnson as Bertil Svensson
- Bernt Ström as Einar Rönn
- Agneta Ekmanner as Greta Hjelm
- Tova Magnusson Norling as Putte Beck
- Ing-Marie Carlsson as Gun Kollberg
- Görel Crona as Charlotte Palmgren
- Marie Richardson as Helena Hansson
- Reine Brynolfsson as Hampus Broberg
- Anders Ekborg as Mats Linder
- Claes Sylwander as Viktor Palmgren
- Catherine Hansson as Karin
- Birger Österberg as Kvant
- Per-Gunnar Hylén as Kristiansson
- Lena T. Hansson as Gunvald Larsson's sister
- Jonas Falk as Stig Malm
- Dan Nerenius as Bo, policeman in SÄPO
- Max Lundqvist as Thomas
- Jonas Bergström as naval officer
- Lena Bergqvist as Hampus Broberg's secretary
- Pontus Gustafsson as Edvardson
- Nicke Wagemyr as policeman in Lidingö
- Stefan Rylander as policeman in Lidingö
- Thomas Segerström as shooting coach
- Curt Spångberg as Backlund
- Mikael Alsberg as doctor
- David H. Ingvar as docent
- Bengt Nilsson as waiter
- Anna Lena Ahlström as Mats Linder's secretary
- Stellan Skarsgård as security guard
