= Torgny Anderberg =

Swedish actor

- Born: 25 February 1919; Tollarp, Kristianstad Municipality, Sweden
- Died: 6 November 2000 (aged 81); Stockholm, Sweden
- Occupations: Actor, film director
- Years active: 1944–2000

Torgny Anderberg (25 February 1919 – 6 November 2000) was a Swedish actor and film director. He appeared in more than 25 films and television shows between 1944 and 1993.

Anderberg was an avid documentary filmmaker parallel to his work in fiction films. His documentary work is arguably comparable to that of the enthofiction of Jean Rouch, as his early documentaries melded documentary and fiction film strategies in their discourse. A similar rhetoric is also found in his later work.

Anderberg made frequent trips to Latin America following the production of Anaconda, documenting encounters with indigenous people of the jungles, something he did up to his final film Kondormannen 2003.

He collaborated several times with explorer Rolf Blomberg on a series of features and short films with an ethnographic content.

== Selected filmography ==
- A Ship Bound for India (1947)
- The People of Simlang Valley (1947)
- Life in the Finnish Woods (1947)
- The Poetry of Ådalen (1947)
- Big Lasse of Delsbo (1949)
- The Devil and the Smalander (1949)
- The Realm of the Rye (1950)
- Kalle Karlsson of Jularbo (1952)
- Anaconda (1954)
- Med Rolf Blomberg på djungelfärd (1957)
- Jangada: En brasiliansk rapsodi (1958)
- Fridolf Stands Up! (1958)
- Äventyr bland huvudjägare (Adventures amongst the head reducers, 1958)
- Good Friends and Faithful Neighbours (1960)
- Villervalle i Söderhavet (1962)
- Att vara indian (Being an Indian, 1969)
- Indianer är de människor (Are Indians People, 1969)
- Jakt på Inkaguld (In Search of for the Inca Gold, 1969)
- Inca Solfolket (Incas, the Sun People, 1970)
- Amazonas Sjukhuset (1973)
- Indianer i Amazonas (1973)
- The Man on the Roof (1976)
- Frihetens murar (1978)
- Tåg till himlen (Ecuador, 1989)
- Freud Leaving Home (1991)
- Roseanna (1993)
- The Fire Engine That Disappeared (1993)
- Kondormannen (2003)
