= Friends (1988 film) =

1988 Japanese-Swedish drama film

- Directed by: Kjell-Åke Andersson
- Written by: Kōbō Abe (play); Kjell-Åke Andersson
- Starring: Dennis Christopher
- Cinematography: Peter Mokrosinski
- Release date: 6 May 1988 (Sweden)
- Running time: 87 minutes
- Countries: Japan; Sweden
- Language: English

Friends is a 1988 Japanese-Swedish drama film directed by Kjell-Åke Andersson. Peter Mokrosinski won the award for Best Cinematography at the 24th Guldbagge Awards.

== Cast ==
- Dennis Christopher as John
- Sven Wollter as Zeb
- Stellan Skarsgård as Matt
- Lena Olin as Sue
- Anita Wall as Jennifer
- Aino Taube as Matilda
- Helena Bergström as Bonnie
- Edita Brychta as Sally
- Craig Richard Nelson as The Client
