= Irma Erixson =

Swedish actress

- Born: Irma Rut Erixson Hjort; 8 July 1937 (age 87); Stockholm, Sweden
- Occupation: Actress
- Spouses: Tommy Johnson (m. 1959; div. 1963) Folke Hjort (m. 1966; died 1977)

Irma Rut Erixson Hjort (born 8 July 1937) is a Swedish actress. She is daughter to Sven and Ingeborg Erixson, and sister to the artist Sverre Erixson (born 1932).

Erixson educated at Calle Flygare's drama school 1954–56 and debuted with Arne Källerud at his theatre Nöjeskatten in Stockholm.

In 2009 Erixson appeared in the play Blodsbröllop at Halland Theatre.

== Selected filmography ==
- 1957 - Värmlänningarna
- 1963 - Adam och Eva
- 1963 - Sten Stensson Returns
- 1981 - Tuppen
- 1982 - Polisen som vägrade svara (TV)
- 1988 - Polisen som vägrade ta semester (TV)
- 1998 - Rena rama Rolf (TV)
- 2001 - Kommissarie Winter (TV)
- 2003 - Solbacken: Avd. E (TV)
- 2003 - Lejontämjaren
- 2004 - The Return of the Dancing Master
- 2015 - Jönssonligan – Den perfekta stöten
