= Days Like This (film) =

2001 film by Mikael Håfström

- Swedish film poster
- Directed by: Mikael Håfström
- Starring: Kjell Bergqvist
- Release date: 16 November 2001
- Running time: 95 minutes
- Country: Sweden
- Language: Swedish

Days Like This (Swedish: Leva livet) is a 2001 film directed by Mikael Håfström. It stars Kjell Bergqvist and Carina Johansson. It won two awards at the 2002 Guldbagge Awards.

== Cast ==
- Kjell Bergqvist as Leif
- Carina Johansson as Lena
- Christian Fiedler as Evert
- Ulla-Britt Norrman-Olsson as Siv
- Lia Boysen as Malin
- Staffan Kihlbom as Martin
- Fares Fares as Michael
- Josefin Peterson as Elin
- Anders Ahlbom Rosendahl as Rune
