= Peter Mokrosinski =

Polish-Swedish cinematographer (born 1953)

- Born: 2 May 1953 (age 73); Łódź, Poland
- Occupation: Cinematographer
- Years active: 1984-present

Peter Mokrosinski (born 2 May 1953) is a Polish-Swedish cinematographer. At the 24th Guldbagge Awards he won the award for Best Cinematography for the film Friends. At the 29th Guldbagge Awards he was nominated for the same award for the film The Man on the Balcony. He has worked on more than 45 films and television shows since 1984.

== Selected filmography ==
- Friends (1988)
- The Man on the Balcony (1993)
- Speak Up! It's So Dark (1993)
- Sökarna (1993)
- Du Pappa (1994)
- Tic Tac (1997)
- Evil (2003)
- Dalecarlians (2004)
- The Girl Who Played with Fire (2009)
- The Girl Who Kicked the Hornets' Nest (2009)
