= Lena Brogren =

Swedish actress (1929–2005)

Ulla-Britt ("Lena") Brogren (18 April 1929 in Västerås – 21 September 2005 (aged 76) in Gothenburg) was a Swedish actress.

In the 1950s, Brogren started working at Gothenburg City Theatre, where she was one of the names on the posters. Her appearances in the plays Lång dags färd mot natt and Kaos är granne med Gud were well known. In the play Tjena Gary, she acted against Ingvar Hirdwall. Hagge Geigert made her engaged for playing the "bad" children's book author Mrs Smythe in the play En man för mycket at Liseberg Theatre in 1992.

== Selected filmography ==
- 1952 – Secrets of Women
- 1957 – Lille Fridolf blir morfar
- 1973 – Om 7 flickor
- 1976 – Hem till byn (TV)
- 1978 – Hedebyborna (TV)
- 1981 – Tuppen
- 1981 – Rasmus på luffen
- 1981 – Operation Leo
- 1982 – Polisen som vägrade svara (TV)
- 1994 – Rena rama Rolf (TV)
- 1998 – Svenska hjärtan (TV)
- 2003 – Solbacken: Avd. E (TV)
- 2005 – Saltön (TV)
