= Tuppen (film) =

1981 film

- Directed by: Lasse Hallström
- Written by: Olle Hellbom; Lasse Hallström; Catti Edfeldt
- Based on: Ivar Lo-Johansson
- Produced by: Olle Hellbom
- Starring: Magnus Härenstam
- Cinematography: Jörgen Persson
- Edited by: Lasse Hallström; Jan Persson
- Music by: Georg Riedel; Gunnar Svensson
- Production companies: Svensk Filmindustri; Svenska Filminstitutet
- Distributed by: Svensk Filmindustri
- Release date: 4 September 1981
- Running time: 97 minutes
- Country: Sweden
- Language: Swedish

Tuppen is a 1981 Swedish film directed by Lasse Hallström.

== Cast ==
- Magnus Härenstam - Cederqvist
- Lill-Anna Andersson - Lisa
- Ellinor Bille - Barbro Karlsson
- Åsa Bjerkerot - Gerda Skogsberg
- Ing-Marie Carlsson - Karin Petrén
- Annika Christensen - Bodil
- Annika Dopping - Magda Fors
- Suzanne Ernrup - Ottilia
- Maria Johansson - Hjördis Nilsson
- Ebba Malmström - Cecilia
- Pernilla August - Åsa Eriksson
- Allan Edwall - Thorsson
- Lena Brogren - Old Lady
- Lars Göran Carlson - Disponent
- Anita Ekström - Anna
- Irma Erixson - Old Lady
