= Folkteatern =

Regional theatre in Gothenburg, Sweden

Coordinates: 57°42′2″N 11°57′12″E

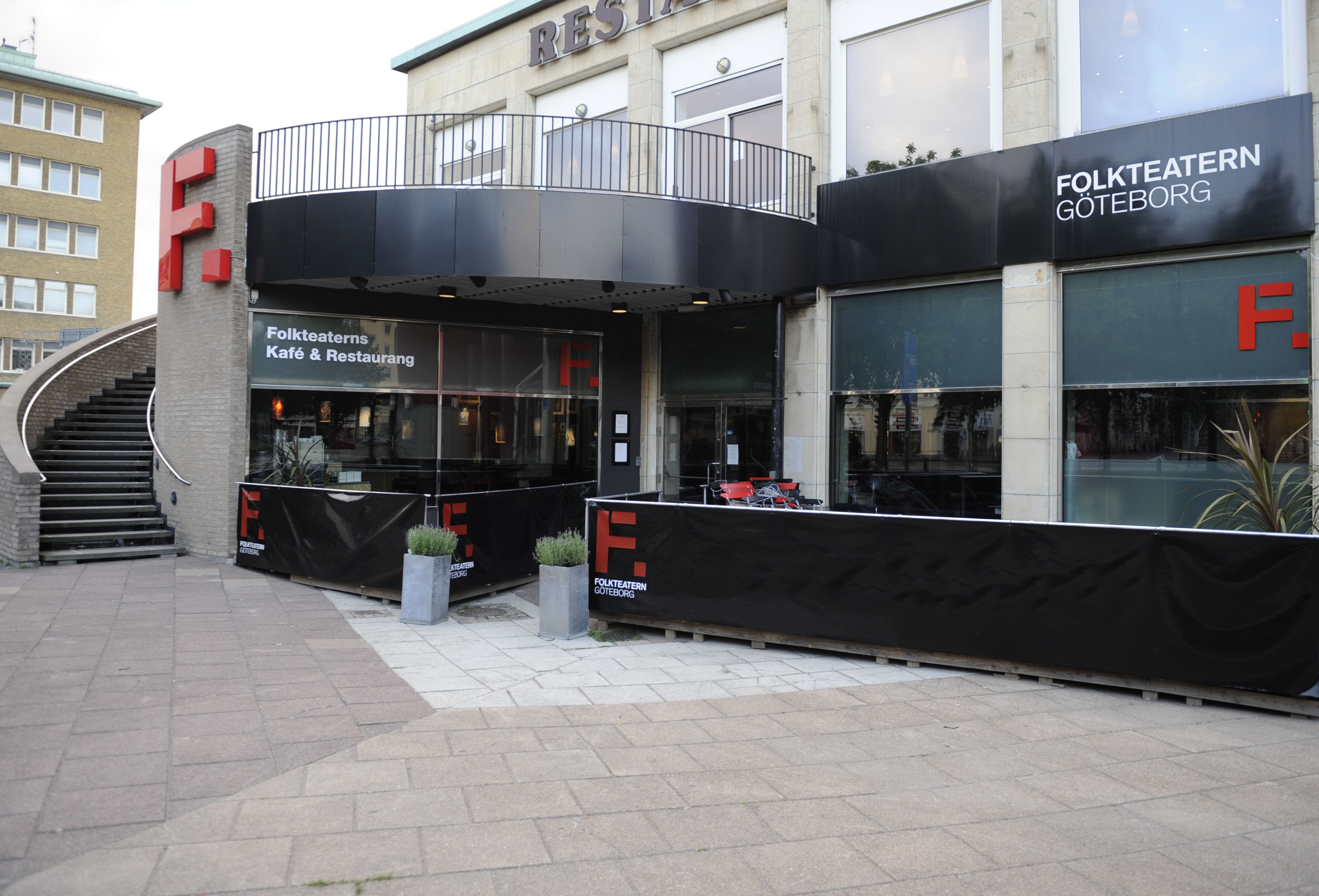
Folkteatern

Folkteatern is a regional theatre in Gothenburg, Sweden. The theater receives grants and assignments from the Västra Götaland Regional Council.

The theatre was built in 1951 at Järntorget and has from the start had close connections with the worker's movement. Today the theatre is funded by the government as well as the regional authority and is owned by 300 different organizations. The big stage has 400 seats, while the smaller one has a capacity of 60 seats. The theatre has had a broad repertoire, from classical pieces like Hamlet to contemporary, political and satirical plays. Among the directors of the theatre through the years have been Lennart Hjulström and Iwar Wiklander.

== See also ==
- People's Theatre (disambiguation)
