= Carin Hjulström =

Swedish television presenter

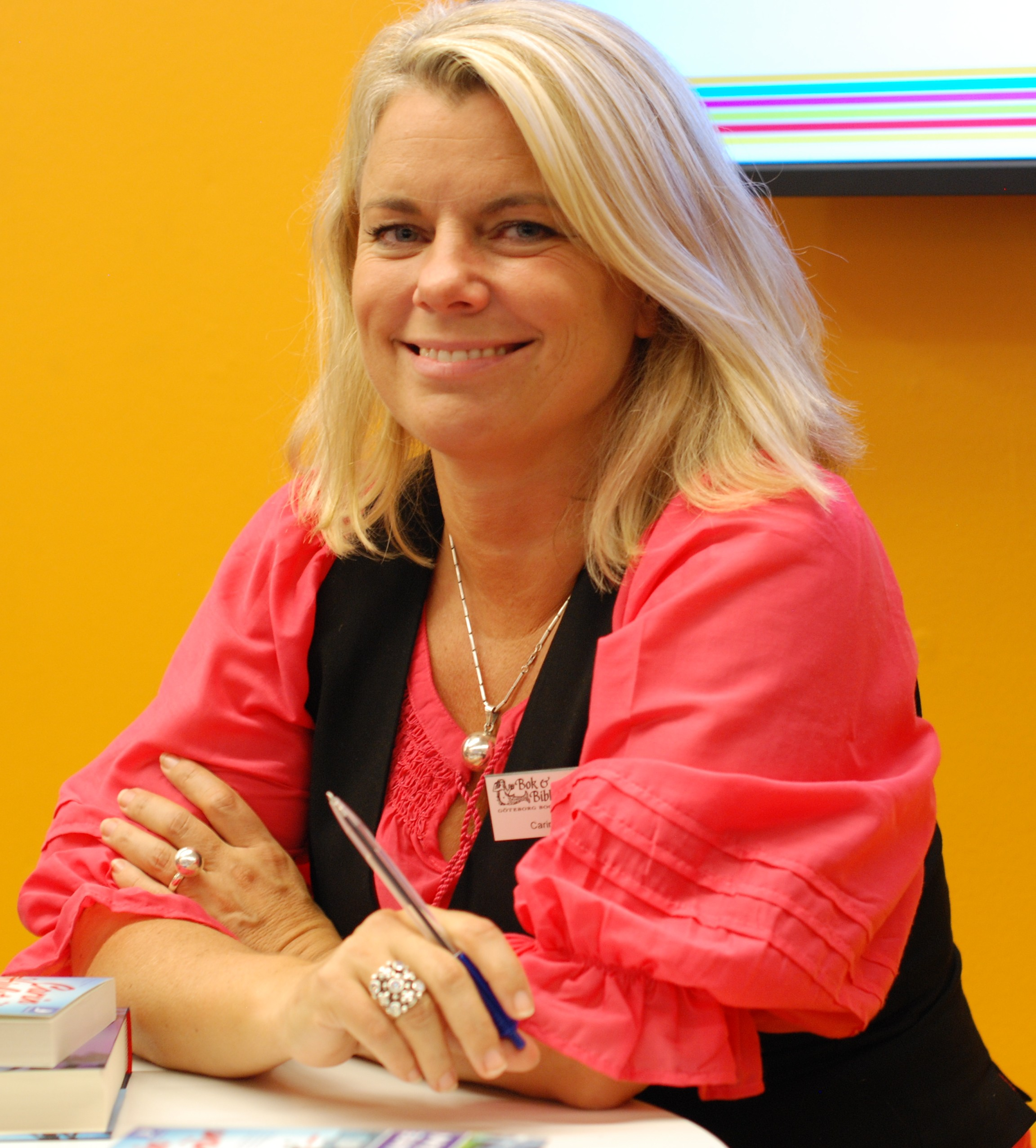
- Hjulström during a book signing at the Gothenburg Book Fair in September 2010.
- Born: Karin Astrid Maria Hjulström; 31 August 1963 (age 62); Örgryte, Sweden
- Occupations: Television presenter, journalist, author
- Spouse: Stefan Livh (m. 1990–2007)
- Parent(s): Lennart Hjulström; Ulla Söderdal
- Relatives: Niklas Hjulström (brother); Fredrik Hjulström (brother); Hanna Nyroos (half sister); Filip Hjulström (grandfather)

Karin Astrid Maria Hjulström (born 31 August 1963), better known as Carin Hjulström, is a Swedish television presenter, journalist and author. She is one of Sweden's most known television presenters and has presented shows such as Melodifestivalen, Carin 21:30 and Mun över bord.

== Early life ==
Hjulström was born in Örgryte, Gothenburg to mother Ulla (née Söderdal), a school teacher and father, Lennart Hjulström, an actor and director. At the age of twelve, she landed a main role in the radio Christmas show Frida och farfar (English: Frida and grandfather). During high school she studied natural science. After her parents divorced, Hjulström and her brother Niklas moved in together to an apartment, joining the rock band Art and participating in the Swedish national Rock championships Rock-SM 1982. They failed to make it amongst the top three, and Rock-SM was won by the later worldwide known rock band Europe.

== Career ==
Hjulström applied for both journalism and medical education major courses, resulting in being admitted to both. However, she opted for journalism. Upon graduation, Hjulström worked both as a reporter for newspapers Göteborgs-Tidningen and Aftonbladet. Between 1987 and 1989 she presented the television music show Gig followed by other shows like Fredagstexter, Melodifestivalen 1990, Mun över bord, Moder Svea, Hon & han along with Paolo Roberto, Carin med C, TV-huset and also Carin 21:30, all on the Swedish public broadcaster SVT.

Hjulström has also worked as a programme developer, screenwriter and information chief for the production company behind MTV in Scandinavia. Hjulström created the drama series Sjätte Dagen. She has also stood on the theater stage during her show Fredag varje dag and sang songs.

Hjulström released her first book Finns inte på kartan at the Gothenburg Book Fair event in 2009.

== Personal life ==
Hjulström was earlier in a relationship and married to radio talk show host Stefan Livh and she took the name of Carin Hjulström-Livh at that time. The couple divorced in 2007. In 2013, her second relationship, with club owner Stefan Albrechtson also came to an end.

== Selected works ==
- Finns inte på kartan, Bokförlaget Forum, 2009
- Hitta vilse, Bokförlaget Forum, 2010
- Kajas resa, Bokförlaget Forum, 2012
