= Echoes from the Dead =

2013 Swedish drama film

- Film poster
- Swedish: Skumtimmen
- Directed by: Daniel Alfredson
- Starring: Lena Endre; Tord Peterson
- Release date: 27 September 2013
- Running time: 99 minutes
- Country: Sweden
- Language: Swedish

Echoes from the Dead (Swedish: Skumtimmen) is a 2013 Swedish drama film based on the eponymous novel by Johan Theorin.

== Cast ==
- Lena Endre - Julia Davidsson
- Tord Peterson - Gerlof Davidsson
- Johan Sundberg – Jens
- Thomas W. Gabrielsson - Lennart Henriksson
- Felix Engström - Nils Kant
