= The Fire Engine That Disappeared (film) =

Brandbilen som försvann
- Directed by: Hajo Gies
- Screenplay by: Rainer Berg; Beate Langmaack
- Based on: The Fire Engine That Disappeared by Sjöwall and Wahlöö
- Produced by: Hans Lönnerheden
- Starring: Gösta Ekman; Kjell Bergqvist; Rolf Lassgård; Niklas Hjulström
- Cinematography: Achim Poulheim
- Release date: 2 July 1993 (Sweden)
- Running time: 90 minutes
- Countries: Sweden; Germany
- Language: Swedish

Brandbilen som försvann is a 1993 Swedish police film about Martin Beck, directed by Hajo Gies.

== Cast ==
- Gösta Ekman as Martin Beck
- Kjell Bergqvist as Lennart Kollberg
- Rolf Lassgård as Gunvald Larsson
- Niklas Hjulström as Benny Skacke
- Bernt Ström as Einar Rönn
- Torgny Anderberg as Evald Hammar
- Per-Gunnar Hylén as Kristiansson
- Birger Österberg as Kvant
- Agneta Ekmanner as Greta Hjelm
- Ing-Marie Carlsson as Gun Kollberg
- Sandra Bergqvist as Bodil Kollberg
- Tova Magnusson-Norling as Putte Beck
- Holger Kunkel as Stoiweiler
- Rolf Jenner as Max Carlsson
- Daniela Ziegler as Nadja Kovacs
