= Jonas Falk =

Swedish actor (1944–2010)

- Born: 3 August 1944; Örgryte, Gothenburg, Sweden
- Died: 26 December 2010 (aged 66); Stockholm, Sweden
- Occupation: Actor
- Years active: 1974–2004

Jonas Emanuel Falk (3 August 1944 – 26 December 2010) was a Swedish actor and brother of actor Niklas Falk. He was born in Örgryte, Gothenburg.

Jonas Falk had been a member of Stockholm City Theatre's fixed ensemble since 1987. Apart from the City Theatre, he appeared in many of Lars Norén's productions on Sveriges Television. Falk died on 26 December 2010, after a period of illness.

== Filmography ==
- 1974 – Fiskeläget
- 1983 – Nilla
- 1984 – Taxibilder
- 1987 – Don Juan
- 1988 – Jungfruresan
- 1989 – Förhöret
- 1989 – 1939
- 1991 – Goltuppen
- 1992 – Kejsarn av Portugallien
- 1993 – Polis polis potatismos
- 1994 – Läckan
- 1994 – Mannen på balkongen
- 1994 – Polismördaren
- 1994 – Pillertrillaren
- 1994 – Stockholm Marathon
- 1995 – Snoken
- 1996 – Ett sorts Hades
- 1996 – Sånt är livet
- 1996 – Ellinors bröllop
- 1997 – Emma åklagare
- 1997 - Tre kronor
- 1997 – Sanning eller konsekvens
- 1997 – Svensson Svensson
- 1998 – Kvinnan i det låsta rummet
- 1998 – Personkrets 3:1
- 1998 – Waiting for the Tenor
- 1998 – Under the Sun
- 1999 – Reuter & Skoog
- 1999 – Skilda världar
- 1999 – Sjön
- 1999 – Vägen ut
- 1999 – God jul
- 2000 – The Wide Net
- 2001 – Skuggpojkarna
- 2001 – Återkomsten
- 2001 – En sång för Martin
- 2001 – Woman with Birthmark
- 2002 – Bella - bland kryddor och kriminella
- 2002 - Skeppsholmen
- 2003 – En ö i havet
