= Roseanna (1993 film) =

1993 film

- Directed by: Daniel Alfredson
- Screenplay by: Jonas Cornell
- Based on: Roseanna by Sjöwall and Wahlöö
- Produced by: Hans Lönnerheden
- Starring: Gösta Ekman; Kjell Bergqvist; Rolf Lassgård; Niklas Hjulström
- Cinematography: Dan Myhrman
- Edited by: Hélène Berlin
- Release dates: 6 October 1993 (Sweden); 4 February 1994 (Sweden Kanal 1)
- Running time: 94 minutes
- Countries: Sweden; Germany
- Language: Swedish

Roseanna is a 1993 Swedish police film about Martin Beck, directed by Daniel Alfredson, based on the novel Roseanna (1965).

== Plot ==
A young American tourist is murdered while on board a cruise ship set sail for Sweden. The body of a victim is discovered in the water by the police, who can't determine the cause of death due to loss of clues. When they finally find something, they use a policewoman as live bait to catch a killer, where she almost gets killed.

== Cast ==
- Gösta Ekman as Martin Beck
- Kjell Bergqvist as Lennart Kollberg
- Rolf Lassgård as Gunvald Larsson
- Niklas Hjulström as Benny Skacke
- Lena Nilsson as Åsa Thorell
- Ingvar Andersson as Per Månsson
- Bernt Ström as Einar Rönn
- Torgny Anderberg as Evald Hammar
- Jacob Nordenson as Folke Bengtsson
- Anita Ekström as Inga Beck, Martin Beck's wife
- Tova Magnusson-Norling as Putte Beck, Martin Beck's daughter
- Anna Helena Bergendal as Roseanna
- Donald Högberg as Karl Åke Eriksson
- Viktor Ginner as Erik Beck, Martin Beck's son
- Agneta Ekmanner as Greta Hjelm
