= The Police Murderer =

1994 film

- Directed by: Peter Keglevic
- Screenplay by: Rainer Berg; Beate Langmaack
- Based on: Cop Killer by Sjöwall and Wahlöö
- Produced by: Hans Lönnerheden
- Starring: Gösta Ekman; Kjell Bergqvist; Rolf Lassgård
- Cinematography: Wolfgang Dickmann
- Release date: 12 January 1994 (Sweden)
- Running time: 89 minutes
- Countries: Sweden; Germany
- Language: Swedish

The Police Murderer (Swedish: Polismördaren) is a 1994 Swedish police film about Martin Beck, directed by Peter Keglevic.

== Plot ==
A woman is found murdered in a closed amusement park. A young couple who happen to be there at the same time become suspects for the murder. They are haunted by police but only criminal inspector Martin Beck believe they are innocent.

== Cast ==
- Gösta Ekman as Martin Beck
- Kjell Bergqvist as Lennart Kollberg
- Rolf Lassgård as Gunvald Larsson
- Tomas Norström as Herrgott Nöjd
- Johan Widerberg as Kasper
- Anica Dobra as Kia
- Helmut Zierl as Gunnar Danielsson
- Heinz Hoenig as Mård
- Jonas Falk as Stig Åke Malm
- Agneta Ekmanner as Greta Hjelm
- Stig Engström as Kaj Sundström
- Anne-Li Norberg as Sigbrit Mård
- Johan H:son Kjellgren as Mohlin
- Pia Green as Cecilia Sundström
- Petra Nielsen as Eva
- Mattias Knave as Mats
- Matti Boustedt as Rick
- Mikael Persbrandt as Police Officer
