= Lennart Hjulström =

Swedish actor and director (1938–2022)

- Born: Lennart Hjalmar Hjulström; 18 July 1938; Karlstad, Sweden
- Died: 3 July 2022 (aged 83)
- Occupations: Actor, film director
- Years active: 1985–2022
- Spouse(s): Ulla Söderdal (m. 1961–1982) Gunilla Nyroos (m. 2007)
- Children: Niklas Hjulström; Carin Hjulström; Fredrik Hjulström; Hanna Nyroos
- Parent(s): Filip Hjulström; Astrid Elmér

Lennart Hjalmar Hjulström (18 July 1938 – 3 July 2022) was a Swedish actor and director. He was married to Gunilla Nyroos and father of Niklas and Carin Hjulström. His father was Filip Hjulström.

== Partial filmography ==
- 1983: Berget på månens baksida (director)
- 1985: August Strindberg: ett liv (TV Mini-Series) – Teaterdirektör Hedberg
- 1986: My Life as a Dog – Konstnären
- 1986: Moa – Karl
- 1986: I lagens namn – Chief of Police
- 1987: Nionde kompaniet – Nils Jönsson
- 1989: Codename Coq Rouge – Näslund
- 1989–1991: Tre kärlekar (TV Series) – Wing commander Erik Söderberg
- 1990: Blackjack – Inger's Father
- 1991: The Ox – Svenning Gustavsson
- 1992: The Best Intentions – Disponent Nordenson
- 1994: Sommarmord – Aahlen, prosecutor
- 1996: Rusar i hans famn (director) – Civil Servant
- 1997: Et hjørne af paradis – Carl von Ekelöw
- 1997: Beck (TV Series) – Gavling
- 1999: Zero Tolerance – Jourkommissarie Ola Sellberg
- 2001: Executive Protection – Sellberg
- 2002: Outside Your Door – Gustav, André's Father
- 2003: Evil – Headmaster Lindblad
- 2003: The Third Wave – Sellberg
- 2005: Medicinmannen (TV Mini-Series) – Alex Holst
- 2007: Predikanten (TV Movie) – Gabriel Hult
- 2008: Oskyldigt dömd
- 2009: The Girl Who Kicked the Hornets' Nest – Fredrik Clinton
- 2012: Hamilton: In the Interest of the Nation – DG
- 2012: Agent Hamilton: But Not If It Concerns Your Daughter – DG
- 2012: The Last Sentence – Marcus Wallenberg
- 2016: Tjuvjägaren – Prästen
- 2017: The Poacher – The Vicar
