= Kjell Bergqvist =

Swedish actor

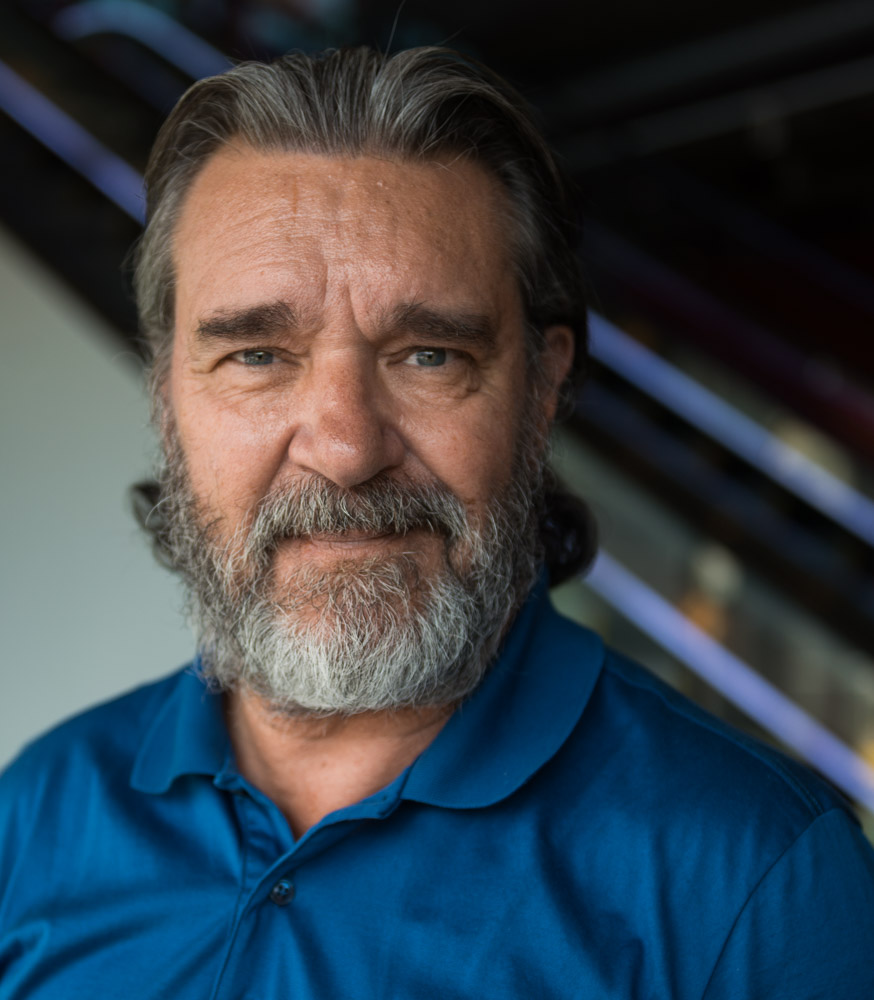
- Kjell Bergqvist in 2015.
- Born: Kjell Bertil Leonard Bergqvist; 23 February 1953 (age 73); Enskede, Sweden
- Occupation: Actor
- Spouses: Yvonne Ryding; (m. 1988; div. 2000): Karin Bergqvist; (m. 2004)
- Children: 4

Kjell Bertil Leonard Bergqvist (born 23 February 1953) is a Swedish actor.

Bergqvist finished the Royal Dramatic Training Academy in 1973 and made his debut in En enkel melodi and Jack. He has since cooperated for many years with scriptwriter and director Ulf Malmros. During the 1990s he participated in several police films playing Martin Beck's colleague Lennart Kollberg. He played two different characters in the Swedish horror television series Chock in 1997. In 2001, he got a Guldbagge Award for his lead role in Den bästa sommaren and in 2002 he was nominated for the lead role Leif in Leva livet. Across three seasons, he portrayed the titular role of Bäckström (2020, 2022, 2024).

Kjell was for a time married to Miss Universe 1984 winner Yvonne Ryding (Yvonne Ryding-Bergqvist; currently divorced).

He starred in Avicii's music video Silhouettes, as the doctor. This video was released on 7 June 2012.

== Selected filmography ==
- 1979 – Katitzi
- 1988 – Besökarna
- 1993 – Roseanna
- 1993 – The Fire Engine That Disappeared
- 1993 – Murder at the Savoy
- 1993 – The Man on the Balcony
- 1994 – The Police Murderer
- 1994 – Stockholm Marathon
- 1996 – Silvermannen
- 1997 – Chock (TV series)
- 2000 – A Summer Tale
- 2001 – Days Like This
- 2003 – Evil
- 2003 – Slim Susie
- 2004 – Drowning Ghost
- 2005 – Tjenare kungen
- 2006 – Göta kanal 2 – Kanalkampen
- 2009 – Bröllopsfotografen
- 2013 – Waltz for Monica
- 2020 – Bäckström
