= Stockholm Marathon (film) =

- Directed by: Peter Keglevic
- Screenplay by: Rainer Berg; Beate Langmaack
- Based on: The Terrorists by Sjöwall and Wahlöö
- Produced by: Hans Lönnerheden
- Starring: Gösta Ekman; Kjell Bergqvist; Rolf Lassgård; Niklas Hjulström
- Release date: 1 July 1994 (Sweden)
- Running time: 90 minutes
- Countries: Sweden; Germany
- Language: Swedish

Stockholm Marathon is a 1994 film directed by Peter Keglevic about the Swedish police detective Martin Beck, loosely based on the last Martin Beck novel, The Terrorists (1975). The title song for the film, "Marathon of Life", was written by Ralf Stemmann and performed by Thomas Anders (of Modern Talking).

== Cast ==
- Gösta Ekman as Martin Beck
- Kjell Bergqvist as Lennart Kollberg
- Rolf Lassgård as Gunvald Larsson
- Niklas Hjulström as Benny Skacke
- Thomas Anders as Ypsilon
