= Tre kronor (TV series) =

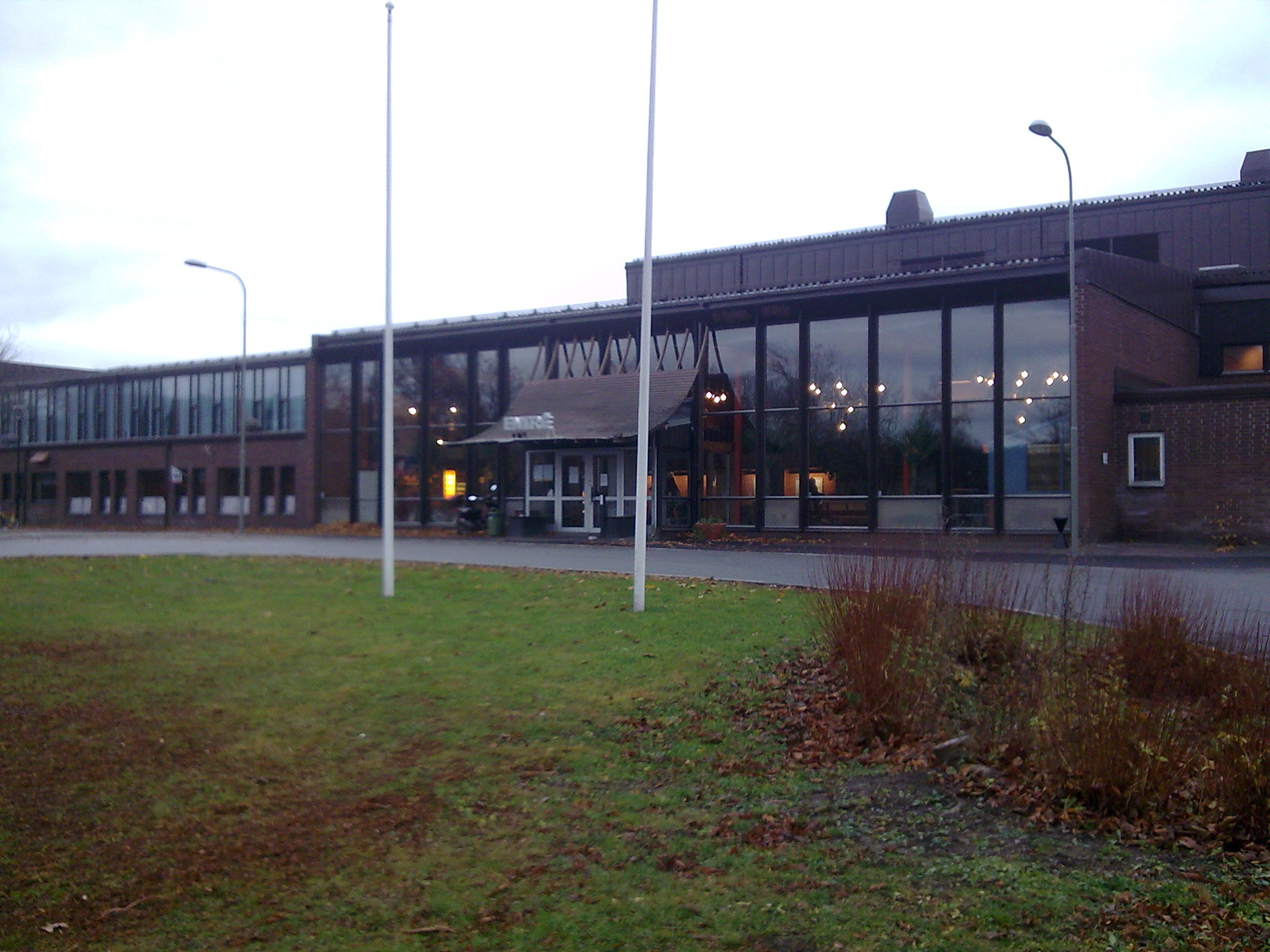
- Farstahallen, which in the series acted as the Tre Kronor restaurant and sports hall.
- Genre: Drama
- Created by: Peter E Falck
- Starring: Ulf Brunnberg; Christina Schollin; Bertram Heribertson; Ing-Marie Carlsson; Emil Lindroth
- Theme music composer: Lasse Holm
- Opening theme: Lasse Holm
- Ending theme: Lasse Holm
- Composer: Lasse Holm
- Country of origin: Sweden
- Original language: Swedish
- No. of seasons: 10
- No. of episodes: 123

Original release
- Release: 21 September 1994 – 7 April 1999

Tre kronor is a Swedish soap opera that aired on TV4 during the period 1994–1999. The series took place in the fictional middle class suburb Mälarviken, located in the vicinity of Stockholm. The exteriors were filmed in Sätra, a suburb of Stockholm, and the interiors were filmed in a studio in Kvarnholmen as well as in Kungens Kurva. TV4 started Tre kronor in 1994 to compete for the viewers of SVT series Rederiet. Both shows aired in the same time slot and both had around 1-2 million viewers. The signature tune was written by Lasse Holm.

The spin-off movie Reine & Mimmi i fjällen! was based on two of the characters; Reine and Mimmi. The series ended with the majority of the cast being unceremoniously killed off in a suicide bombing at the Tre Kronor restaurant, perpetrated by Sten Frisk. Two big cliffhangers in the series was when Hans Wästberg, played by Ulf Brunnberg, robbed the post office and shot his son Hans-Åke by mistake. Hans Wästberg was taken to prison and disappeared from the series after the second season. Season Three ended with Sirpa "Bimbo" Koskinen, the girlfriend of Hans-Åke Wästberg, died in a bus crash. Salongo (played by Richard Sseruwagi) was a refugee and a rich business man from Uganda who fell in love with a married police woman, Lena Sjökvist (played by Catharine Hansson), and he later bought the restaurant, Tre Kronor. Later in the series, Salongo buys another restaurant and he also disappears from the series. Christina Schollins character Birgitta Wästberg is the only one appearing in all 123 episodes.

In the premiere episode, broadcast in October 1994, television show host Leif "Loket" Olsson appeared as a special guest star. Olsson played himself as an auctioneer at Hans Wästbergs auction.

== Characters ==
- Bertram Heribertson - Reine Gustavsson (1994–1997)
- Ing-Marie Carlsson - Mimmi Gustavsson (1994–1997)
- Ulf Brunnberg - Hans Wästberg (1994–1995)
- Christina Schollin - Birgitta Wästberg (1994–1999)
- Niclas Olund - Hans-Åke "Klimax" Wästberg (1994–1998)
- Sara Möller - Lisen Wästberg (1994–1995)
- Bengt Järnblad - Kaj Lindgren (1994–1997)
- Jonatan Rodriguez - Tage Lindgren (1994–1996, 1998–1999)
- Björn Bjelfvenstam - Vener Johnsson (1994-1998)
- Noomi Rapace - Lucinda Gonzales (1996–1997)
- Johanna Sällström – Victoria Bärnsten (1996-1997)
- Polly Kisch - Alva Lindgren (1994–1998)
- Tina Leijonberg - Pernilla Frisk Lindgren (1994–1997)
- Fredag Lundqvist - Hugo Frisk (1994–1997)
- Per Ragnar - Sten Frisk (1994, 1996, 1997–1999)
- Conny Vakare - Leif Sjökvist (1994–1995)
- Catherine Hansson - Lena Sjökvist (1994–1996)
- Paola Oscarsson - Agneta Larsson (1994–1996)
- Richard Sseruwagi - Salongo Sali (1994–1995)
- Emil Lindroth - Jojje Bärnsten (1996-1998)
