= 33rd Guldbagge Awards =

1997 Swedish film awards

- Date: February 9, 1998
- Site: Blå Hallen, Stockholm, Sweden

Highlights
- Best Picture: Tic Tac
- Most awards: Tic Tac (3)
- Most nominations: Adam & Eva (6)

The 33rd Guldbagge Awards ceremony, presented by the Swedish Film Institute, honored the best Swedish films of 1997, and was held on February 9, 1998, in the Blue Hall of Stockholm City Hall. Tic Tac directed by Daniel Alfredsson was presented with the award for Best Film.

== Winner and nominees ==
=== Awards ===
Best Film: Tic Tac; Adam & Eva; Spring för livet	Best Director: Daniel Alfredsson – Tic Tac; Hannes Holm and Måns Herngren– Adam & Eva; Christina Olofson – Sanning eller konsekvens
Best Actress in a leading role: Johanna Sällström – Beneath the Surface; Lena Endre – Spring för livet; Camilla Lundén – Spring för livet	Best Actor in a leading role: Göran Stangertz – Spring för livet; Jacob Eklund – Spring för livet; Björn Kjellman – Adam & Eva
Best Actor in a Supporting role: Emil Forselius – Tic Tac; Jacob Ericksson – Adam & Eva; Krister Henriksson – Slutspel	Best Actress in a Supporting role: Tintin Anderzon – Adam & Eva; Lena Endre – Svenska hjältar; Gerd Hegnell – Rika barn leka bäst
Best Screenplay: Annika Thor – Sanning eller konsekvens; Hannes Holm and Måns Herngren– Adam & Eva; Hans Renhäll– Tic Tac	Best Cinematography: Jens Fischer – Beneath the Surface; Per Källberg – Jag är din krigare; Esa Vuorinen – Svenska hjältar
Guldbagge Award for Best Shortfilm: Annika Thor – Hem ljuva hem; Mia Engberg– The Stars We Are; Bengt Steiner– Som om tiden stått still	Best Foreign Film: Ang Lee – The Ice Storm; Mark Herman – Brassed Off; The Dardenne brothers – La Promesse
