= Solsidan (film) =

2017 Swedish comedy film directed by Felix and Måns Herngren

- Official poster, showing (clockwise from top): Ove Sundberg, Mikaela Schiller, Alexander Löfström, Annette Sundberg, Anna Löfström, and Fredrik Schiller
- Directed by: Felix Herngren; Måns Herngren
- Written by: Jesper Harrie
- Based on: Solsidan
- Produced by: Emma Nyberg
- Starring: Felix Herngren; Johan Rheborg; Mia Skäringer; Josephine Bornebusch; Leonardo Rojas Lundgren; Malin Cederbladh; Henrik Dorsin; Henrik Schyffert; Frida Hallgren; Sven Wollter
- Production companies: FLX; Jarowskij
- Release date: December 1, 2017
- Running time: 104 minutes
- Country: Sweden
- Language: Swedish
- Budget: $4.2 million
- Box office: $14.5 million

Solsidan (lit. "The Sunny Side") is a 2017 Swedish comedy-drama film directed by Felix and Måns Herngren, based on the Solsidan TV-series. Primarily set in Saltsjöbaden, Nacka, the film follows the same general cast as the Solsidan TV-series: Alexander and Anna Löfström, who has recently divorced, their friends Ove and Annette Sundberg, who searches for a sperm donor after finding out that Ove is sterile, and the Schiller family, consisting of Fredrik "Fredde", Mikaela "Mickan", their son Victor, and their daughter Ebba, who travels to Torekov, Skåne, to visit Fredde's estranged father, Mauritz.

Solsidan had a generally positive response from critics and was named the funniest Swedish movie of 2017 by Aftonbladet. The film won the award for Best Makeup at the 53rd Guldbagge Awards, in addition to the Commerzbank Audience Award at the 2017 Filmfest Hamburg.

== Plot ==
On Christmas Eve, dentist Alexander "Alex" Löfström (Felix Herngren) and Anna Löfström (Mia Skäringer) announces to their friends Fredrik "Fredde" Schiller (Johan Rheborg) and Mikaela "Mickan" Schiller (Josephine Bornebusch) that they will divorce. Fredde and Mickan question their choice, eventually leading to Anna revealing that she has met someone else, causing Fredde to become enraged and leave. Several months later, Alex and Fredde are on a golf course where Fredde tries to convince Alex to not divorce, although Alex insists to divorce and that it was a mutual choice.

The film cuts to Alex's childhood friend, Ove Sundberg (Henrik Dorsin), and his wife, Annette Sundberg (Malin Cederblad), who have been unsuccessfully trying to conceive another child and are visiting a hospital to find out why they can't get Annette pregnant. They meet doctor Matilda Beckman, who tells them that Ove has become sterile. Meanwhile, Fredde and Mickan are out grocery shopping when they run into Anna. Trying to avoid an awkward conversation, Mickan invites Anna and her new boyfriend to dinner on the nearest Friday, which Anna accepts.

After parting from his kids for the week, Alex heads off into his new apartment, where he's visited by Ove. Ove decides that he and Alex will go out on a single mingle, and although Alex is hesitant, he eventually agrees. Back at Fredde and Mickan's house, Fredde calls Alex and gives him access to their security system, encouraging him to spy on Anna's new boyfriend, David Grimborg (Henrik Schyffert), during the dinner. After this, Anna and David arrive, causing Fredde to recognize David as a former co-worker at Carnegie Investment Bank.

At Alex's dentist office, Alex meets with Bella Sjölander (Frida Hallgren), who he recognizes from a party he was outside while waiting for Ove the day before. After going back to his apartment, Alex calls Bella and they decide to go watch a movie and meet at a movie theater. However, before entering, they run into Bella's boyfriend, Uffe (Jens Sjögren), who angrily confronts them. Saddened, Alex walks off and goes back to his apartment.

Fredde takes his son, Viktor Schiller (Leonardo Rojas Lundgren), out fishing. After Viktor shares some socialist beliefs, Fredde drives to Ove's house to find his estranged left-wing father, Mauritz Schiller (Sven Wollter). Fredde, resenting his father for being absent during his childhood away on political and humanitarian projects and for disapproving of Fredde's career choice, confronts Mauritz, asking him to stay away from Viktor. Mauritz states that he has had "interesting conversations" with Viktor while helping him study. Mauritz then asks Fredde and his family to come to visit him at his summer house in Torekov the coming summer, causing Fredde to once again ask Mauritz to leave Viktor alone, before driving off.

Back at Alex's dentist office, Alex is again visited by Bella, who informs Alex that she has broken up with Uffe and invites him to watch a movie again. The two then begin dating. Back at the Schiller's house, Fredde and Viktor argue on whether or not to visit Mauritz in Torekov. Mickan, hearing that Mauritz has a summer house in Torekov, eventually manages to coerce Fredde to go. After the Schiller traveled to Torekov and met up with Mauritz, the film returns to Ove and Annette talking with doctor Matilda Beckman again, where they decide to begin looking for a sperm donor. Ove and Annette asks David to be the sperm donor, which he considers, leading to an argument between him and Anna.

In Torekov, Mickan invites several local socialites and celebrities to a drink, while Fredde finds out that Mauritz has heart problems and may not have long to live. When confronted, Marutz explains he did not want to use his illness as a bargaining chip, as he wanted Fredde to visit him of his own free will. in Solsidan, Alex and Anna are saying goodbye, before they kiss and eventually have sex. Later, Alex receives a call from Fredde, inviting him, Bella, and Alex's kids to Torekov for Mickan's drink. At the drink, Ove asks Alex to become their sperm donor, although Alex refuses. Ove then tries to solicit other guests as sperm donors, much to their discomfort.

At the same time, Anna and David are out kayaking to an island, where they continue to argue about David potentially being a sperm donor for Ove and Annette. Anna, getting increasingly fed up with David, ends up calling Alex at the drink, saying that she misses him and wishing that they could get back together. Their conversation however soon turns into an argument and Alex tearfully tells Anna off, saying he is with Bella now. Afterwards, Anna angrily breaks up with David.

After a while, the drink ends and the Schiller family is preparing to drive back to Solsidan. Before driving off, Mauritz thanks Fredde for visiting and asks him to forgive him for being a bad father. Fredde is visibly touched, but says nothing to Mauritz and instead drives back to Solsidan. The film cuts forward to sometime later, showing that Mauritz has died and his funeral is held, which is attended by the Schiller family, Alex, Bella, Ove, and Annette, among others. Fredde is saddened that he never made up with his father, but Mickan comforts him, saying they at least got some form of closure. As they grieve Mauritz's death, they are interrupted by Annette crying loudly. They confront her, resulting in her revealing that Mauritz had agreed to be their sperm donor. After the funeral, Alex admits to Bella that he had sex with Anna, but she forgives him.

A few days later, Alex wakes up in the middle of the night to Bella crying. Bella reveals that she had slept with Uffe, similarly to Alex, and that she felt guilty for not telling Alex. The two then mutually decide to break up. After his and Bella's break-up, Alex and Anna decide to get back together. The film ends on Christmas Eve at the Schiller family's home, making the film go full circle. Everything goes well until Alex asks Fredde when his "baby brother" is due, leading to an awkward silence.

== Cast ==
- Felix Herngren as Alexander "Alex" Löfström
- Mia Skäringer as Anna Löfström
- Henrik Dorsin as Ove Sundberg
- Malin Cederblad as Annette Sundberg
- Johan Rheborg as Fredrik "Fredde" Schiller
- Josephine Bornebusch as Mikaela "Mickan" Schiller
- Leonardo Rojas Lundgren as Victor Schiller
- Sven Wollter as Mauritz Schiller
- Henrik Schyffert as David Grimborg
- Frida Hallgren as Bella Sjölander
- Jens Sjögren as Uffe

== Production ==
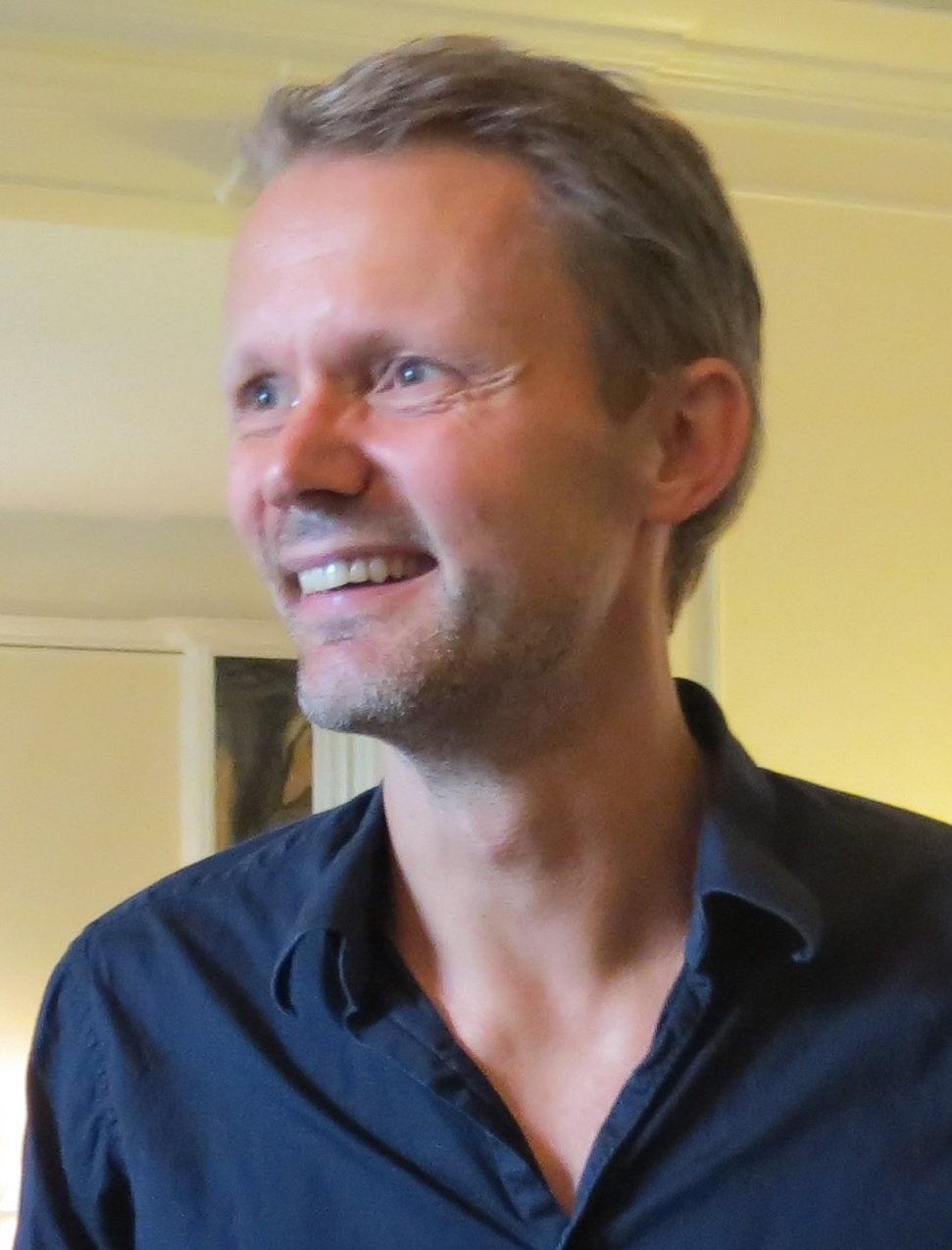
Co-director Felix Herngren at the 2012 Polar Music Prize reception

Solsidan was directed by brothers Felix and Måns Herngren, both of which have worked on the Solsidan TV-series, which the film is based on. Prior to Solsidan, Felix and Måns had worked together on other projects. In an interview with Swedish film-focused website Filmtopp, Felix stated that it had been relieving to have co-directed the film with Måns, due to them being able to understand each other and due to them asking "very different questions". In the same interview, Felix expressed that it was helpful to have two directors for the film, due to one director being able to film in Torekov, while the other director was filming in Saltsjöbaden.

=== Casting ===
Solsidan has the same general cast as the Solsidan TV-series, but also has some new cast members, such as Henrik Schyffert, who portrays Anna Löfström's new boyfriend, David Grimborg. Another new cast member is Sven Wollter, who portrays Fredde Schiller's left-wing father, Mauritz. According to Felix Herngren, he had wanted to work with Wollter for a long time, with Wollter joining the film's cast after being coerced to by his children. Incidentally, Wollter has shared communistic beliefs, similarly to his character, which Herngren stated was irrelevant to his casting.

== Reception ==
=== Critical response ===
Solsidan had a generally positive response from critics, holding a score of 3.4/5 on Swedish review aggregator Kritiker.se, based on 14 reviews. The film was described by critics as "extremely entertaining", with Aftonbladet naming it the funniest 2017 Swedish film. Many critics thought that Solsidan was funny with a more serious and darker underlying tone. Karsin Svensson of Smålandsposten wrote that, under the film's "dynamic" dialogue, lay a more "gray and sadder" plot, which she stated was especially present during Alex's scenes.

Magnus Tosser of Norrbottens-Kuriren praised Fredde's character, noting him as the character that made him laugh the most throughout the film. SVT Nytheter also praised Fredde's character, in addition to his wife Mickan, citing Mickan stating that she "doesn't know anything about Pokémons" in response to her son asking her about how Che Guevara died as one of the film's funniest scenes. Göteborgs-Posten praised Sven Wollter's portrayal of Mauritz, describing the portrayal as "elegant".

Svenska Dagbladet and Göteborgs-Posten were more mixed towards the film. Svenska Dagbladet opined that the film was "too kind to be really funny" and also wrote that it discluded the "saltiness" of the Solsidan TV-series, and Göteborgs-Posten wrote that the film's "exaggerations", at times, becomes "ridiculous", concluding that the film's script was "thin".

=== Box office ===
Solsidan had a positive commercial response, grossing over $12.4 million in Sweden, making it one of the highest-grossing Swedish films. Solsidan was the highest-grossing Swedish film in January 2018, surpassing Star Wars: The Last Jedi. Elsewhere, the film grossed over $2.1 million, (Note: According to Box Office Mojo, the film grossed over $1.5 million in Norway, over $586 thousand in Finland, and over $30 thousand in Hungary.) accumulating to a worldwide gross of $14.5 million.

=== Accolades ===
Year	Award	Category	Recipient	Result	Ref.
2017	Guldbagge Awards	Audience Award	Solsidan	Nominated	
2017	Guldbagge Awards	Best Actress in a Leading Role	Mia Skäringer	Nominated	
2017	Guldbagge Awards	Best Makeup	Petra Cabbe	Won	
2018	Filmfest Hamburg	Commerzbank Audience Award	Solsidan	Won	

== Potential sequel ==
In an interview with Expressen in July 2018, Felix Herngren stated that a second film based on the Solsidan TV-series was possible, although he also stated that they would need a good story before beginning production.
