= The Anderssons Rock the Mountains =

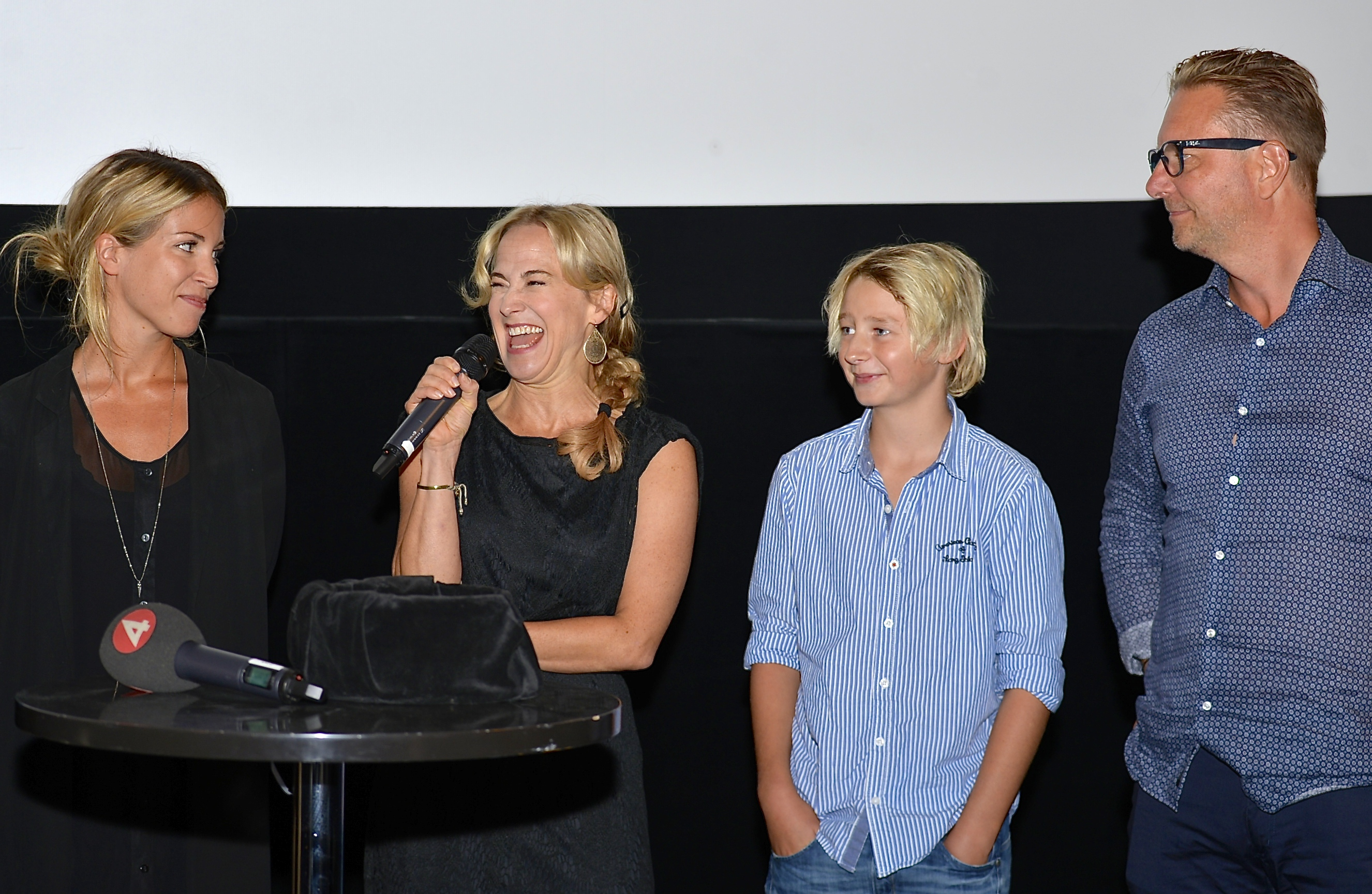
- Some of the people behind the film. From left: Producer Teresa Alldén-Willey, actors Anja Lundqvist and William Ringström, and producer Patrick Ryborn.
- Directed by: Gustaf Åkerblom
- Written by: Hannes Holm
- Based on: Sune by Anders Jacobsson and Sören Olsson
- Produced by: Teresa Alldén-Willey, Patrick Ryborn
- Starring: Morgan Alling, Anja Lunqvist, William Ringström
- Cinematography: Mats Axby
- Production companies: Eyeworks Scandi Fiction, Nordisk film, SVT, Film i väst, Nouvago Capital
- Distributed by: Nordisk Film
- Release date: 19 December 2014 (Sweden)
- Running time: 92 minutes
- Country: Sweden
- Language: Swedish

The Anderssons Rock the Mountains (Swedish: Sune i fjällen) is a Swedish comedy, children's and family film, which opened at cinemas in Sweden on 19 December 2014. The film, partly recorded in Åre, is the final in a trilogy of Sune films.

== Plot ==
The film tells the story of the Andersson's family skiing vacation to the Swedish parts of the Scandinavian Mountains.

== Production ==
The mountain scenes were shot during March and April 2014 near Åre, at places like Ullådalen and Duved. Shooting also occurred at Edsåsdalen and Östersund. The work was later completed at Gothenburg.

== Actors ==
The following actors appear:

- William Ringström - Sune
- Morgan Alling - Rudolf
- Anja Lundqvist - Karin
- Julius Jimenez Hugoson - Håkan
- Hanna Elffors Elfström - Anna
- Julia Dufvenius - Sabina
- Erik Johansson - Pontus
- Kajsa Halldén - Sofie
- Kalle Westerdahl - Ragnar
- Frida Hallgren - Yvonne
- Malte Gårdinger - Santos
- Bonn Ulving - Pär Päron
- Manuel Dubra - Santo's father
- Patrik Zackrisson - olycks-Jörgen
- Kristina Korths-Aspegren - olycks-Kicki
- Martin Andersson - reindeer herd
- Emma Melkersson - Linda
- Emanuel Edoff - Peder
- Pontus Eklöf - Roger
- Jörgen Persson - man with sled dog
- Ebbe Olsson - Thoma's father
- Wiliam Mehler - Thomas
- Jimmy Söderblom - ice sculptor
- Maja Fahl - headteacher
- Jon Olsson - himself
- Jessica Almenäs - Let's Dance programme host
- Tony Irving - Let's Dance jury member
- Dermot Clemenger - Let's Dance jury member
- Ann Wilson - Let's Dance jury member
- Madeleine Claesson - Statist

== Music ==
Music

- Änglahund with Vikingarna
- Canelloni, Macaroni with Lasse Holm
- La belissima estate (One Beautiful Summer)
- Diggi-Loo Diggi-Ley
- La Bamba with The Music Super Men
- De sista ljuva åren
- Papaya Coconut with Kikki Danielsson
- De ä bar å åk with the Swedish National Skiing Team

== Home video ==
The film was released to DVD and blu-ray in 2015.
