= The Anderssons Hit the Road =

- Directed by: Hannes Holm
- Written by: Hannes Holm
- Based on: Sune books by Anders Jacobsson and Sören Olsson
- Produced by: Patrick Ryborn
- Starring: William Ringström; Morgan Alling; Anja Lundqvist; Julius Jimenez Hugoson; Hanna Elffors Elfström
- Cinematography: Mats Axby
- Production company: Eyeworks Sweden
- Distributed by: Nordisk Film
- Release date: 25 December 2013 (Sweden)
- Running time: 95 minutes
- Country: Sweden
- Language: Swedish

The Anderssons Hit the Road (Swedish: Sune på bilsemester) is a Swedish comedy, children and family film opening at cinemas in Sweden on 25 December 2013. It was written by Hannes Holm together with Anders Jacobsson and Sören Olsson, and among the actors were William Ringström, Morgan Alling and Anja Lundqvist.

== Plot ==
The Andersson's family go on a road trip across Europe towards a village in South Tyrol, where Mr. and Mrs. Andersson went on a honeymoon 20 years earlier. Living in the village is a girl Sune likes, but also an artist who can make the family rich.

== Production ==
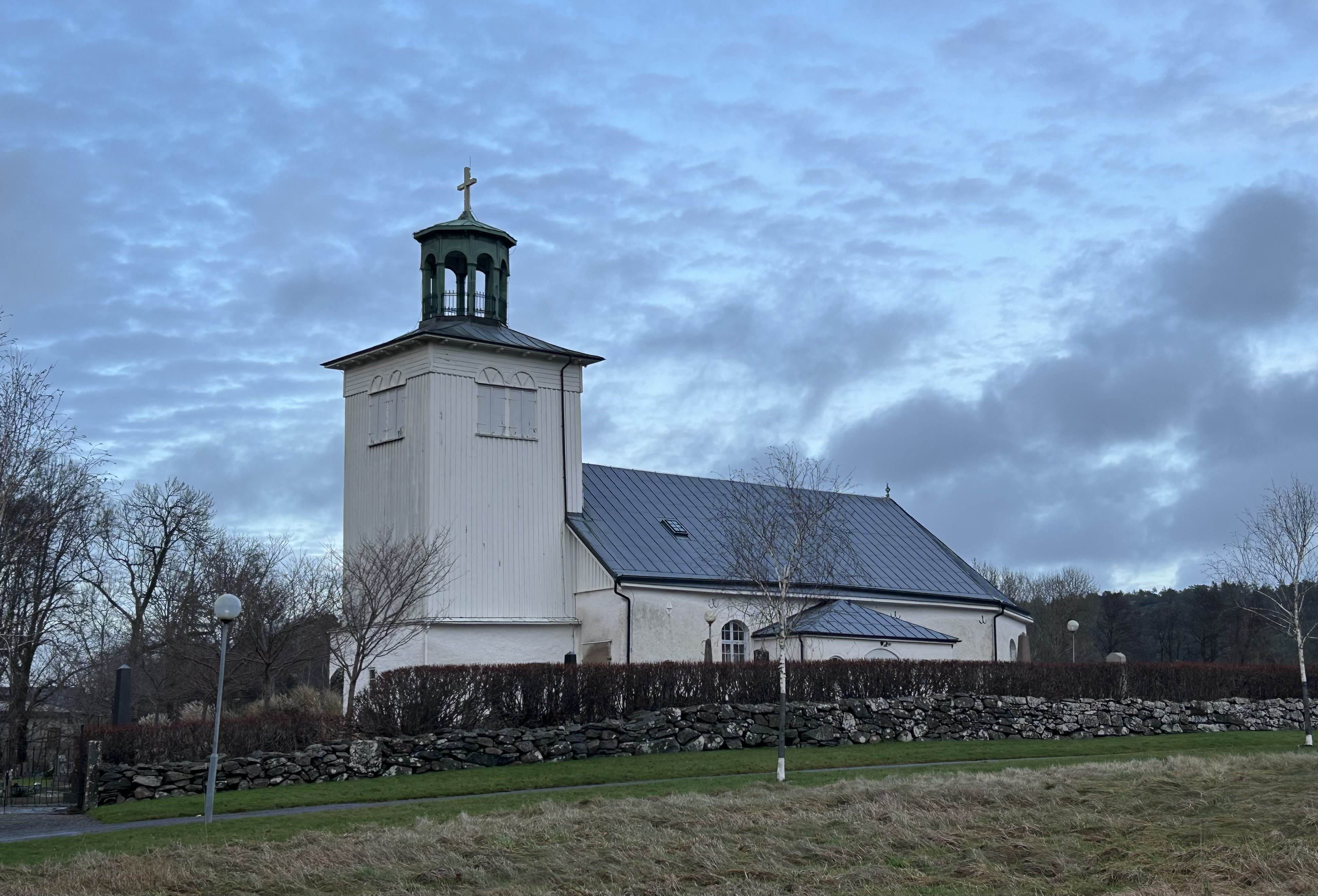
Recordings were done at Nödinge Church

The church wedding scenes at the beginning were shot at Nödinge Church in early July 2013.

The vacationing scenes were shot at places like Hanover, Bolzano, the Brenner Pass and the Tyrol village of Margreid an der Weinstraße. The amusement park scenes were shot at Ravenna, but represent central Germany.

== Cast ==
- William Ringström – Sune
- Morgan Alling – Rudolf
- Anja Lundqvist – Karin
- Julius Jimenez Hugoson – Håkan
- Hanna Elffors Elfström – Anna
- Johannes Sjöblom – Benjamin
- Julia Dufvenius – Sabina
- Erik Johansson – Pontus
- Feline Andersson – Hedda
- Kajsa Halldén – Sofie
- Kalle Westerdahl – Ragnar
- Frida Hallgren – Yvonne
- Bonn Ulving – Pär
- Dao Di Ponziano – young Nicole/Nora
- Claudia Galli Concha – Nicole

== Home video ==
The film was released to DVD and Blu-ray in 2014.
