= The 101-Year-Old Man Who Skipped Out on the Bill and Disappeared =

2016 Swedish comedy film

- Swedish theatrical release poster
- Directed by: Felix Herngren; Måns Herngren
- Written by: Felix Herngren; Hans Ingemansson
- Starring: Robert Gustafsson
- Production companies: Nice Flxpictures; Buena Vista International Sweden AB; Film i Väst; FLX; Hihi Enterprises; Nice Drama; Nordsvensk Filmunderhållning; RG Production; TV4
- Distributed by: Walt Disney Studios Motion Pictures Sweden AB
- Release date: 25 December 2016
- Running time: 108 minutes
- Country: Sweden
- Languages: Swedish; English; Russian; German
- Budget: 63 million SEK ($9.6 million)

The 101-Year-Old Man Who Skipped Out on the Bill and Disappeared is a 2016 Swedish comedy adventure film directed by Felix Herngren and Måns Herngren. The film serves as a sequel to the 2013 film The Hundred-Year-Old Man Who Climbed Out of the Window and Disappeared, based on the novel of the same name by Jonas Jonasson.

== Plot ==
One year after the events of previous film, a group of friends celebrate Allan Karlsson's 101st birthday in Bali. Allan offers Miriam and Julius his last "Folksoda", a carbonated beverage that Allan had accidentally created during his double agent days in the 1970s. As the pair argue over who will drink the soda, Allan's pet Capuchin Erlander finishes the bottle. Miriam and her husband Benny depart for Malmköping, while Allan and Julius stay at the resort with Gäddan.

Allan notes that that was the last Folksoda in existence, and that his secret formula is stashed inside a cigar box in Amanda Einstein's apartment in Berlin. Allan calls Amanda who invites him to come and retrieve the formula. Julius, Allan, and Gäddan head for the airport. On the flight, a stewardess named Rebecca opens Allan's carry-on suitcase allowing Erlander to escape, forcing the pilot to make an emergency landing in Moscow.

A woman named Stirna meets with her therapist, Håkan, after seeing news coverage of a viral video featuring Julius and Erlander, and of the plane's emergency landing in Russia. She recognizes Allan as the man who had stolen the secret formula from her late father, Popov. She convinces Håkan to join her in tracking down Allan. Meanwhile, Rebecca's husband, Bas, realises that Allan is the man who had stolen 50 million dollars from his brother, Pim. Bas packs a bag of weapons and heads to Moscow.

Allan, Julius, and Gäddan are freed by the authorities, but Erlander is kept in quarantine. Allan recalls that during a film shoot for Folksoda in East Germany, he had met Popov's young daughter, Kristina. Stirna bribes the Russian authorities into giving her Erlander. She pressures Håkan into organizing a swap: Erlander in exchange for the secret formula. When Allan and Julius arrive, they discover Håkan dead, having choked on a champagne cork. Allan, Julius, and Gäddan board a train for Berlin, with Stirna and Bas in pursuit.

Allan falls asleep and dreams about the night Popov was killed as he tried to leave the East Germany with the secret formula. With his final breath, he had told Allan that the secret formula must be delivered to "K".

In Berlin, Amanda reminisces about a wild party in the 1970s where Allan had got a tattoo on his left buttock while under the effects of LSD. Benny goes to Allan's old nursing home to collect his belongings, hoping to find more bottles of Folksoda. Stirna and Allan locate the cigar box, only to find that it contains nothing but cigars. Allan realises that the formula is in his other cigar box in Malmköping.

Inspector Aronsson and a pair of CIA agents arrive at the nursing home, where their questioning is interrupted by Benny's nervous vomiting. Allan and Julius sneak in to find that Allan's belongings have already gone. Allan, Julius, Gäddan, and Stirna race to Benny's house and arrive just in time to save the cigar box from being used as kindling. They retrieve the microfilmed formula.

Stirna confesses that she is Popov's daughter Kristina. Having finally found "K", Allan gives her the formula and tells her to return home. Bas arrives, holds everyone at gunpoint, and is given the money Allan had stolen from Pim. Inspector Aronsson shoots Bas, who falls into a well and is killed by his own exploding grenade. Julius discovers that Allan's tattoo on his buttock is a Russian transcription of how to make Folksoda.

Sometime later, Miriam and Benny organize a luncheon at their house for Allan Jr., their newborn son. Stirna, having decided to stay with her new friends, helps Julius re-create Folksoda in an outdoor synthesis lab, but finds they are missing a vital step in the process. As Allan sits down with his friends to enjoy a meal, a lightning bolt strikes, creating a fire that mimics the one Allan had caused all those years ago.

== Cast ==
- Robert Gustafsson as Allan Karlsson
- Iwar Wiklander as Julius Jonsson
- David Wiberg as Benny
- Shima Niavarani as Miriam
- Jens Hultén as Gäddan
- Svetlana Rodina-Ljungkvist as Stina
- Ralph Carlsson as Inspector Aronsson
- Jay Simpson as Bas
- David Shackleton as Herbert Einstein
- George Nikoloff as Popov
- Eric Stern as Håkan
- Eleanor Matsuura as Rebecca
- Colin McFarlane as Seth
- Erni Mangold as Amanda Einstein
- Crystal the Monkey as Erlander
- Valentin Smirnitsky as Leonid Brezhnev
- Darrell Duffey as Richard Nixon
- Mark Jardine as Bob Haldeman
- Joseph Long as Henry Kissinger
- Dagny Carlsson as Patient at the retirement home

At the time of release, Dagny Carlsson was 104 years old.
