= Marie Robertson =

Swedish actress (born 1977)

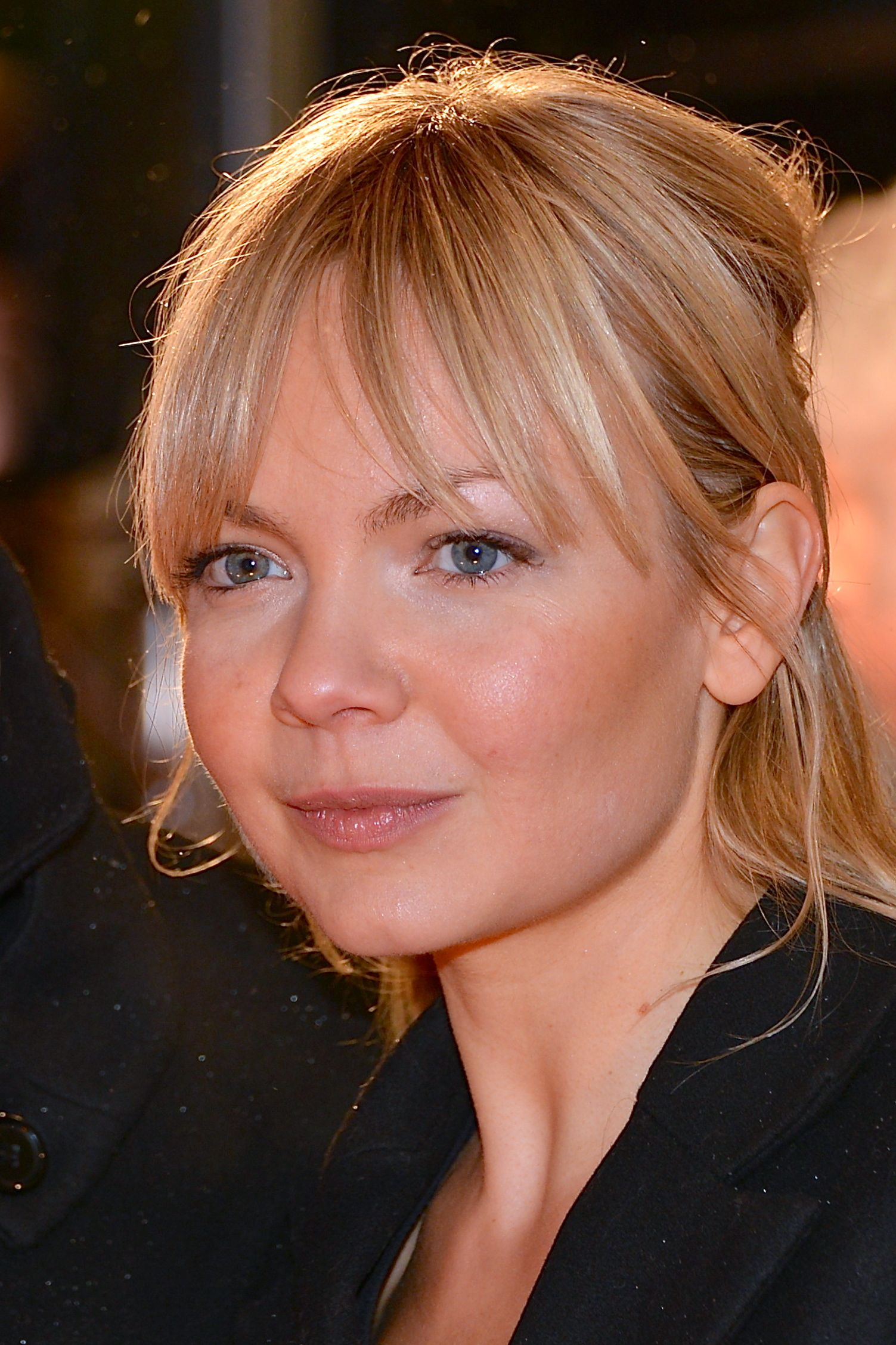
- Born: 14 April 1977 (age 48); Sunne, Sweden
- Occupation: Actress

Marie Charlotte Robertson (born 14 April 1977) is a Swedish actress. She was born in Sunne, Sweden.

== Filmography ==
- Rederiet (TV, 1998)
- Trettondagsafton (TV, 1999)
- Tre kronor (TV, 1999)
- Ett litet rött paket (TV, 1999)
- Heartbreak Hotel (2006)
- Rallybrudar (2008)
- Playa del Sol (TV, 2009)
- Saltön (TV, 2010)
- Solsidan (TV, 2011)
- Gränsen (2011)
- Hur många lingon finns det i världen? (2011)
- Svensson, Svensson (2011)
- Cockpit (2012)
- De närmaste (2012)
- Real Humans, Äkta människor (TV, 2013) : Bea/Beatrice Novak
- Solsidan (TV, 2013)
- Beck (TV, 2015) Familjen
- Morden i Sandhamn (TV, 2015)
- Sommaren med släkten (TV, 2019)
- Solsidan (TV, 2019)
- Panik i Tomteverkstan (TV, 2019)
- Fullt hus (TV, 2020)
- Lyckoviken (TV, 2021)
- Young Royals (TV, 2024)
