= Herngren =

Herngren is a Swedish surname. Notable people with the surname include:

- Felix Herngren (born 1967), Swedish film director, actor and comedian
- Måns Herngren (born 1965), Swedish actor and film director
