= Solsidan season 3 =

Solsidan
- Season 3
- No. of episodes: 10

Release
- Original network: TV4
- Original release: October 7, 2010

Season chronology
- ← Previous; Season 2 Next → Season 4

The third season of Solsidan, a Swedish television comedy series, created by comedian and actor Felix Herngren, Jacob Seth Fransson, Ulf Kvensler and Pontus Edgren premiered on October 7, 2012 on TV4.

== Episodes ==
| No. overall | No. in season | Title | Directed by | Written by | Original release date | Swedish viewers (millions) |
|---|---|---|---|---|---|---|
| 21 | 1 | "Husköpet (The house purchase)" | Felix Herngren & Niclas Carlsson | Felix Herngren | October 7, 2012 | 2,03 |
Alex and Anna has purchased their new house only to discover it needs renovation. They hire Ove as a dummy to raise their saleprice on their old house. Meanwhile Fredde is trying to get Victor interested in subjects like mathematics. At the same time they discover that they've got bedbugs. When Ove hears that the house that Alex has bought is located on Vitsippebacken 37, he laughs and says that it's called the "house of break-ups", due to the many break-ups that has occurred there.
| 22 | 2 | "The Switch" | Måns Herngren | Daniella Mendel-Enk | October 14, 2012 | 1,92 |
| 23 | 3 | "Samåkning (Carpooling)" | Måns Herngren | Mia Skäringer & Josephine Bornebusch | October 21, 2012 | 1,94 |
| 24 | 4 | "Släktforskning (Genealogy)" | Unknown | Unknown | October 28, 2012 | 1,97 |
| 25 | 5 | "Inneboende (Lodger)" | Unknown | Niclas Carlsson | November 4, 2012 | 1,84 |
| 26 | 6 | "Sittkissaren (Sit-down Peeing)" | Unknown | Unknown | November 11, 2012 | 1,76 |
| 27 | 7 | "Kompensationsfaktorn (Compensation factor)" | Unknown | Unknown | November 18, 2012 | 1,91 |
| 28 | 8 | "Miljövänlig (Environment Friendly)" | Unknown | Unknown | November 25, 2012 | 1,95 |
| 29 | 9 | "Kemtvätten (Dry cleaner)" | Unknown | Niclas Carlsson | December 2, 2012 | 1,81 |
| 30 | 10 | "Vattnet går (The Water Breaks)" | Tova Magnusson | Niclas Carlsson, Jesper Harrie | December 9, 2012 | 1,81 |
