= Smash (miniseries) =

1990 Swedish television series

- Written by: Måns Herngren; Hannes Holm
- Directed by: Måns Herngren; Hannes Holm
- Starring: Måns Herngren; Svante Grundberg; Peter Wahlbeck; Felix Herngren; Sten Ljunggren
- Country of origin: Sweden
- Original language: Swedish

Production
- Producer: Christian Wistrand
- Cinematography: Leif Benjour
- Running time: circa 30 minutes

Original release
- Network: SVT1
- Release: 4 January – 22 February 1990

Smash is a 1990 Swedish comedy television mini-series with eight episodes written and directed by Måns Herngren and Hannes Holm. Herngren also stars in the series, along with Svante Grundberg, Peter Wahlbeck, Felix Herngren and Sten Ljunggren. It was released on 4 January 1990.

== Plot ==
In the 1970s, the search for young tennis talents reached its peak when the superstar Einar Berg threw in the towel. Fifteen years after his retirement, Berg makes a comeback because of financial problems and he teams up with teens Alex, Sigge and Teo, where they travel around the world and play tennis.

== Episodes ==
=== Episode 1 "Va é de för set" ===
Sigurd 'Sigge' Grönqvist (Wahlbeck) and Alexander 'Alex' Carlsson (M. Herngren) are two teenagers who are picked for tennis practice by Wallner (Ljunggren), a manager and Börje (Norström), a trainer. They are soon joined by a visiting school pupil Teofil 'Teo' Broström (F. Herngren), and former international tennis star, Einar Berg (Grundberg). Teo turns out to be rather good at tennis, even though he has never played it and the four of them combine their different skills and personalities to form a rather odd quartet in the tennis world.

=== Episode 2 "Fack Off" ===
The team is in London to play tennis at Wimbledon. However, Alex discovers that the prize money is exactly the same amount as last year, meaning it's a lowering of real wages. This, and the fact that the others are also displeased about different matters, leads him to starting a tennis union, making the quartet and soon every player in Wimbledon go on a strike.

=== Episode 3 "Den vita sporten" ( The white sport ) ===
When the team is sent to South Africa, Wallner leaves them no money to leave there or go home. His plan is that they play tennis and win the game, to make money. However, with the rest of the world having heavy sanctions on South Africa, due to its apartheid policies, playing tennis there is a no-no for anybody. Thus, the gang desperately tries to gather money in any way they can except to play tennis, in order to get home.

=== Episode 4 "God jul" ( Merry Christmas ) ===
When Christmas arrives, the team gets a week off. At first, they are overjoyed, but when Alex, Sigge and Teo come home to their families, they discover, that they are no fun anymore. Sigge's dad (Ahlbom) only wanted money from him. Alex's parents didn't believe he has money and were incredibly stingy with money, they even refused to get a new Christmas tree and instead used the one they had last year which was broken. Teo's parents didn't even want to celebrate Christmas - they just wanted to continue their scientific research instead. Einar spent the whole Christmas drinking at the hotel. When Teo, dressed up as Santa Claus, delivered Sigge's parents' Christmas presents to the wrong address by mistake, it turns out that Christmas wasn't as much fun as they had thought and in the end, they are all very relieved to be back at the hotel for New Year's.

=== Episode 5 "Check Out" ===
When the team is about to leave their hotel in Rome, they find that their manager Wallner hasn't paid for them, so they are not allowed to leave. Being stuck at their hotel room, they try various schemes to raise money. Finally, they manage to get their hands on enough money for one person to get out. They send out Teo, to go to the bank and get money for the others. However, getting the money is easier said than done for Teo. Secondly, the manager wants them out of the room, and so does the new room occupant.

=== Episode 6 "Wow, håll käften!" (Wow, shut up!) ===
The trainer Börje shows the team a diagram of their latest training results, and it turns out that they are all in super shape - saying they are better than Mats Wilander and Boris Becker put together. This gives them a huge dose of self-confidence, making them win every match they play. As their earnings increase, they fire Börje and Wallner and look for other managers. However, they all start to worry about what to do with all the money they make. Alex wants to invest his, Einar wants to party away, Sigge tries to do something useful with his and Teo tries to give his away to charity, without any luck. When Börje turns up and tells them, that he had misread the diagram and that they are still as bad as always, they lose their self-confidence, and it's back to work again for the boys.

=== Episode 7 "Flygresan" (The Air Trip) ===
The team oversleeps on their plane to Stockholm, and have to hurry to get their tickets from Wallner and hurry onto the next plane headed to Rome. On the plane, they discover that it's the same plane that they flew into Stockholm on when Teo finds his shoes he forgot on that plane. They also discover that this plane isn't going to Rome, but to Frankfurt. But when the plane is hijacked, the hijackers demand the pilot's set to fly to Rome, causing the team to be strangely delighted. The hijackers turn out not to be so bad after all, but to deal with them is easier said than done. When they arrive in Rome, a not so pleasant surprise awaits the team.

=== Episode 8 "TV-programmet" (The Television Show) ===
The team is in Mexico when they receive a telegram from Wallner with orders to go directly to Malmö, Sweden. Sigge thinks they're gonna be in the television show "This Is Your Life". When they arrive in Malmö, it turns out that they are going to be on television alright, but on a game show called "Snick-snackarna". Teo becomes very nervous and even has nightmares about appearing on the show. He fears he will say an inappropriate word and in order to get his mind off that word, they try to hypnotize him, with a less than desired result. As they are humiliated on the show, they decide to never be on television again, but they change their minds when one of the producers suggest they play the lead roles in a television series - a comedy about four guys playing tennis.

== Cast ==
=== Main cast ===
- Måns Herngren as Alexander 'Alex' Carlsson
- Svante Grundberg as Einar Berg
- Peter Wahlbeck as Sigurd 'Sigge' Grönqvist
- Felix Herngren as Teofil 'Teo' Broström
- Sten Ljunggren as Wallner
- Tomas Norström as Börje

=== Other cast members ===
- Claes Månsson as Porter
- Per Eggers as Consul
- Björn Granath as Hostess
- Tintin Anderzon as Alice, Hijacker 1
- Per Holmberg as Hijacker 2
- Tor Isedal as Alex's dad
- Meta Velander as Alex's mom
- Irma Schultz as Alex's girlfriend
- Peder Falk as Theo's dad
- Anders Ahlbom as Sigge's dad
- Ika Nord as Carola, Sigge's sister
- Anders S. Nilsson as Sigge's brother
- Stellan Skarsgård as Financial Secretary to the Minister

== Reception ==
According to Herngren in 2009 (when the series was released on DVD), the show did not receive good reviews on its initial release, although ratings later showed that it was popular among the younger audience. Herngren also explained that the long wait for DVD release was due to a music rights issue that was finally resolved.
