= Solsidan season 1 =

Solsidan
- Season 1
- No. of episodes: 10

Release
- Original network: TV4
- Original release: January 29 – April 9, 2010

Season chronology
- ← Previous - Next → Season 2

The first season of Solsidan, a Swedish television comedy series, created by comedian and actor Felix Herngren, Jacob Seth Fransson, Ulf Kvensler and Pontus Edgren premiered on January 29, 2010 on TV4 and ended on April 9, 2010. The series is about Alex (Felix Herngren) and Anna (Mia Skäringer), a couple expecting their first child and planning to move to where Alex grew up, the posh neighbourhood of Solsidan, the name of which means "The Sunny Side". The show has been sold internationally and will be aired in Norway, Denmark, Finland and Iceland. On December 3, 2010, the producers announced that the script to the series had been sold to the American network ABC, which plans to create their own version of the series to air in the United States.

== Plot ==
Alex is a thirty-nine-year-old dentist, who moves back to his childhood home in Saltsjöbaden, Stockholm, along with his pregnant girlfriend Anna. Anna works as an actor and feels like an outsider in Alex's old neighbourhood. Alex's mother Margareta has sold the couple her house, but thinks that she still lives there. Fredde is Alex's childhood friend who lives down the block with his wife Mickan and two children. Ove Sundberg is another of Alex childhood friends who is believed to be the dullest and greediest resident in Solsidan.

== Cast ==
The first season has four main characters as well as several recurring characters:

- Alex Löfström (Felix Herngren)
- Anna Svensson (Mia Skäringer)
- Fredde Schiller (Johan Rheborg)
- Mickan Schiller (Josephine Bornebusch)
- Margareta Löfström (Mona Malm)
- Lussan (Rebecka Englund)
- Ove Sundberg (Henrik Dorsin)
- Anette Sundberg (Malin Cederbladh)
- Palle Svensson (Magnus Krepper)
- Victor Schiller (Carl Sjögren)
- Ebba Schiller (Ester Granholm and Otilia Anttila)

== Episodes ==
No. overall	No. in season	Title	Directed by	Written by	Original release date	Swedish viewers (millions)
1	1	"Inflytten (Moving in)"	Felix Herngren	Ulf Kvensler	January 29, 2010	1,84
Alex Löfström and his fiancée Anna are having a baby together and are moving into Alex's old childhood home in fashionable Solsidan, outside Stockholm. They also find out that Alex's mother isn't really ready to move out.
2	2	"Är jag pappa till barnet? (Am I the father of the child?)"	Felix Herngren	Ulf Kvensler	February 5, 2010	1,48
Alex suspects that Anna has had an affair with famous Swedish actor Ola Rapace and that Rapace is the father of Anna's unborn baby. Fredde has developed an addiction to barbecuing.
3	3	"Namndiskussion och tråkiga grannar (Name discussion and boring neighbors)"	Ulf Kvensler	Ulf Kvensler	February 12, 2010	1,50
Alex and Anna learn the sex of the baby, but can't agree on a name. Fredde thinks that he changes the diapers more often than Mickan and Alex's old childhood friend and neighbor visits.
4	4	"Parmiddagshets (Couple dinner stress)"	Ulf Kvensler	Jacob Seth Fransson	February 19, 2010	1,35
Alex and Fredde try to top each others' dinners and Anna joins Mickan at her gym, but has trouble fitting in.
5	5	"Alex hatar Ove (Alex hates Ove)"	Ulf Kvensler	Pontus Edgren	February 26, 2010	1,19
Anna is anguished when she is about to buy a stroller. Fredde is losing his hair and tries to overmaster the hair loss. Alex loses his patience with Ove, which he regrets when he finds out that Ove is head of the golf club.
6	6	"Åldersnoja (Age paranoia)"	Jacob Seth Fransson	Jacob Seth Fransson	March 5, 2010	1,54
Alex is feeling old and is thinking about ageing, Fredde tell him about his convergence theory and that every person becomes equally attractive when they get older.
7	7	"Nya vänner (New Friends)"	Jacob Seth Fransson	Ulf Kvensler	March 12, 2010	1,53
Alex and Anna are tired of their friends only caring about material things in life; Fredde has trouble with the tax office and Mickan gets stress symptoms.
8	8	"Kim på middag (Kim for dinner)"	Jacob Seth Fransson	Felix Herngren	March 19, 2010	1,63
Fredde becomes jealous of Mickan's friendship with an Italian guy on paternity leave and decides to get revenge. Anna's brother Palle visits.
9	9	"Midsommarfest (Midsummer party)"	Ulf Kvensler	Ulf Kvensler	April 2, 2010	1,57
Midsummer's Eve is approaching and Fredde and Alex are planning to celebrate with their family and friends, when Ove and his boring wife show up.
10	10	"Förlossning (Childbirth)"	Jacob Seth Fransson	Jacob Seth Fransson	April 9, 2010	1,54
Anna is in labor and Alex tries to help but realizes that he isn't able to. Fredde scares Alex's construction workers off and is forced to finish the job himself.
