= Swedish Ski Team =

Swedish Ski Team may refer to:

- Swedish Bikini Team, a fictional group used in Old Milwaukee beer commercials in 1991
- Ski Team Sweden, the national skiing team of Sweden
