= Solsidan season 2 =

Solsidan
- Season 2
- No. of episodes: 10

Release
- Original network: TV4
- Original release: January 14 – March 20, 2011

Season chronology
- ← Previous; Season 1 Next → Season 3

The second season of Solsidan, a Swedish television comedy series, created by comedian and actor Felix Herngren, Jacob Seth Fransson, Ulf Kvensler and Pontus Edgren, premiered on January 16, 2011 on TV4 and will end on March 20, 2011. This season will feature the wedding between Alex and Anna and Anna's parents will appear, her dad is a military and her mom an ex-beauty queen. Over all, Anna and Mickan will be the main-characters for a greater part of the show. Also, Alex neighbor Tord Malmberg will appear more since he is getting together with Alex's mom Margareta.

The episodes of the second season is posted on TV4 Play Premium, a pay on demand service by TV4, on Fridays and is aired on Sundays. The Finnish TV-channel FST5 was at the beginning airing the episodes two days before their original air date in Sweden, this caused great legal trouble for the Finnish network who was forced to stop that and air the episodes at the same time as TV4.

The first episode was seen by 2,530,000 viewers in Sweden, that's the highest rating that TV4 has had in over a decade. One week after the airing had 3,2 million people seen it, then included the re-run and all web-views.

On December 3, 2010, the producers announced that the script to the series had been sold to the American network ABC, which plans to create their own version of the series to air in the United States.

== Plot ==
Alex and Anna have just moved into a new house in Solsidan since their old house had some mold trouble. Alex has decided to ask Anna to marry him but as problems finding the perfect moment to pop the question. Anna has begun working as a masseuse again and to get some practice she offered Mickan a free massage, but Mickan forgets and Fredde has to take her place, which makes him really uncomfortable. When Alex finally has decided how to propose to Anna, Ove Sundbergs shows up and destroys the moment. Alex planned a romantic picnic by the sea with a choir showing up in the background when he asks Anna. But Ove refuses to leave the spot that Alex has chosen, but at the end Alex doesn't care and proposes to Anna in front of Ove and she says "yes".

Fredde and Mickan get a nanny, Mickan isn't pleased with her because she thinks that Fredde stares at her boobs too much, and she gets a new older lady instead. But it seems like she and Fredde has a lot in common and are getting along a little to well so she firers her as well and hires a third nanny, a homosexual man. Mickan has figured out a way to save money, she buys clothes, furniture and such and then return them after she has used them. It drives Fredde crazy since it is he who has to spend his weekend returning all the stuff.

Fredde's old childhood tormentor, Kristian, is now together with Lussan, Mickan's best friend and is moving back to Solsidan from Géneve, where he has lived until now. Alex tries to calm Fredde down by saying that Fredde at least is the wealthiest man in Solsidan and has a wonderful family. It then shows that Kristian owns around 22 billion Swedish kronor and is among the richest Swedes. Fredde doesn't know what to do, he is no longer the wealthiest man in Solsidan. To get back at Kristian he introduces him to Ove Sundberg, who absolutely wants to become friend with a billionaire.

Alex feels that he and Anna has an unfair way of dividing the households chores and wants to introduce a new currency to be able to buy himself free when you have collected enough money. Anna has a negative feeling about it and it all falls apart when she demands household money for sex.

== Reception ==
=== Ratings ===
The first episode of the second season broke all viewing records and was seen by the entire 2.53 million viewers in Sweden. This is the highest rating TV4 had in ten years, except for two episodes of Let's Dance, which came up in the same level. In Finland, the first episode was viewed by 100 000 viewers. After one week, 3.2 million had seen the first episode in Sweden, then also included any person who has recorded, viewed on the Web or watched the first replay.

The second episode dropped a bit but was still seen by over two million, to be exact 2.31 million. The episode was highlighted in the UK for the false domestic currency as Alex and Anna introduced, "uscados ". British Sky News wrote about the series which according to them is seen by a full 25% of the population.

== Cast ==
The second season has five main characters as well as several recurring characters:

- Alex Löfström (Felix Herngren)
- Anna Svensson (Mia Skäringer)
- Fredde Schiller (Johan Rheborg)
- Mickan Schiller (Josephine Bornebusch)
- Ove Sundberg (Henrik Dorsin)
- Anette Sundberg (Malin Cederbladh)
- Margareta Löfström (Mona Malm)
- Lussan (Rebecka Englund)
- Palle Svensson (Magnus Krepper)
- Victor Schiller (Leonardo Rojas Lundgren)
- Ebba Schiller (Ester Granholm and Otilia Anttila)

== Episodes ==
No. overall	No. in season	Title	Directed by	Written by	Original release date	Swedish viewers (millions)
11	1	"Frieri (Proposal) "	Felix Herngren	Ulf Kvensler	January 14, 2011 (TV4 Play Premium, FST5); January 16, 2011 (TV4)	2,53
Alex has decided to propose to Anna, but has trouble finding the perfect moment. Anna starts working as a masseuse and Mickan and Fredde gets a nanny. Mickan thought that a nanny would be the solutions to all her problems but becomes an even greater problem for her and more trouble.
12	2	"En miljardär flyttar till Solsidan (A billionaire moves to Solsidan) "	Felix Herngren	Felix Herngren	January 16, 2011(TV4 Play Premium); January 21, 2011 (FST5); January 23, 2011 (TV4)	2,23
Fredde's old childhood friend moves back to Saltis, and it turns out that he is richer than Freddie and have been associated with Mickans friend Lussan. Mickan has set the system to trade items on open purchase, and every time she goes shopping, she is returning a whole load of things. It ends with her not remember what is theirs and what should be returned. Alex and Anna argues about who is actually doing most of the household and will agree to establish a special currency in the home.
13	3	"Alex mamma har en ny kille (Alex' mother has a new boyfriend) "	Jacob Seth Franssson	Jacob Seth Franssson	January 30, 2011 (TV4)	2,33
Alex and Anna is redecorating and is temporarily moving home to Alex's mom Margareta, who reveals her new love, Tord Malmberg, the horrible neighbor from Alex childhood. Mickan is losing her maid to Lussan and has to win her back in some way. Ove tries to be friendly with the new billionaire in Solsidan, Kristian.
14	4	"Skrikande fågel ställer till det (A screaming bird causes trouble) "	Jacob Seth Franssson	Pontus Edgren	February 6, 2011 (TV4)	2,31
When Annette and Ove are going away, they get Alex and Anna take care of their cockatiel Sonja as Ove had since he was a child. For Anna, who have problems with breastfeeding, it will be an additional burden in all the chaos. Freddie buys the most advanced home theater systems that become so advanced that it can hardly be used. Anna complains about Alex's old clothes and Alex buys a shirt which he thinks is stylish, contemporary and a little daring, Anna points out that he bought a girl shirt, which Alex refused to agree to. Freddie tries to teach Alex how to avoid shopping women's clothing.
15	5	"Cancernoja och ideellt arbete (Cancer madness and voluntary work) "	Johan Rheborg	Johan Rheborg	February 6, 2011 (TV4 Play Premium); February 13, 2011 (TV4, FST5)	2,364
Freddie discovers that he has a few bumps on a sensitive spot on his body and thinks immediately that it is cancer. Via the Internet, he contacts a doctor in the United States confirming that there is a risk that death is knocking at the door. Alex and Anna fight about what to throw away all of the old lumber in the basement. Anna accuses Alex of being an incurable saver while Alex thinks that Anna throws away too much. Mickan meets a friend who started a new life with a new husband and also has a passion for volunteering. Mickan feels guilty and starts to engage with the victims of society. But the nonprofit will take time and Mickan must decide what to prioritize.
16	6	"Besvärlig sjukling gäckar Fredde (A bothersome valetudinarian crosses Fredrik) "	Jacob Seth Fransson	Jacob Seth Fransson; Johan Rheborg	February 13, 2011 (TV4 Play Premium); February 20, 2011 (TV4, FST5)	2,248
Fredde and Mickan is visited by Fredde's cousin Linn and her socially incompetent husband Göran. Göran is sick and Fredde must keep a good face but wonder how much you have to accept just because someone is sick. Alex is going to Ikea but have unexpected and unwanted companion of Ove who instead praises Jysk. Anna still has a little barb after giving birth and want to quickly lose weight for a test shooting.
17	7	"Mickan oroar sig för att Fredde ska bli fet (Mickan worries about Fredde getting fat) "	Ulf Kvensler	Felix Herngren	February 20, 2011 (TV4 Play Premium); February 27, 2011 (TV4, FST5)	2,184
Alex happens to inadvertently take on his female patient in the dental chair. Word of mouth and a feather will soon become a chicken. The rumor is not helped by the fact that Anna for a girl dinner will find traces of a very questionable use of the Internet in Alex's computer. Anna is however worried that their daughter Wilma does not develop normally. She thinks her Mom group is becoming a competitive arena where mothers compare the development of children, she feels she does not really fit in there. Mickan concerned that Freddie will be fat and will do anything to prevent it.
18	8	"Fredde och Mickan åker på slottsweekend (Fredde and Mickan spends the weekend at a castle) "	Jacob Seth Fransson	Jacob Seth Fransson; Pontus Edgren	February 27, 2011 (TV4 Play Premium); March 6, 2011 (TV4, FST5)	2,025
Fredde and Mickan fight a lot and decides that they have to get it together. They go on a romantic castle weekend to strengthen the relationship but it turns out that reality is not as glamorous as it seemed in the brochure. Anna get harder and harder to fit in with Saltis strangest mother group. When she and the Mom group go out on the Child-free weekend together they soon begin talking behind her back. Alex will have a cozy weekend with only Wilma. But Ove is obviously informed and is going to be grass widower as well.
19	9	"Fredde testar singellivet (Fredde tries out single life) "	Ulf Kvensler	Johan Rheborg	March 6, 2011 (TV4 Play Premium); March 13, 2011 (TV4, FST5)	2,170
Mickan blast off with the kids for the weekend witch result in a midlife crisis for Fredde, and he realizes that married life is rough and test single scene with his 15 years younger cousin. Anna's parents come to visit before the big wedding, which is now approaching. Anna's father is retired early and fragile. Both he and Anna's mom doing everything they can to interfere with Alex and Anna's everyday lives and wedding preparations. Ove is throwing his 40th birthday party, forcing Alex to speak despite the fact that Alex has neither the time nor the desire to be present at the party.
20	10	"Bröllopet (The wedding)"	Ulf Kvensler	Ulf Kvensler	March 13, 2011 (TV4 Play Premium); March 20, 2011 (TV4, FST5)	2,164
The wedding approaches, which seem to end in disaster, at the wedding photographer Anna can't take it anymore and she runs off with Alex after. They discovered that they have forgotten Wilma at the photographer and are forced to break in to retrieve her. Margareta and Anna's mother is in a conflict regarding the bridal veil Anna will use at the wedding. Fredde lays out filming on contract and fills the church with the film crew and lighting that destroys floral arrangements. Ove and Anette interfere the seating arrangements.
