= The Anderssons in Greece =

- Film poster
- Swedish: Sune i Grekland
- Directed by: Hannes Holm
- Written by: Hannes Holm
- Based on: Sune in Greece by Anders Jacobsson and Sören Olsson
- Produced by: Patrick Ryborn
- Starring: William Ringström; Morgan Alling; Julius Jimenez Hugoson; Feline Andersson; Anja Lundqvist; Hanna Elffors Elfström; Erik Johansson; Julia Dufvenius; Kajsa Halldén
- Production companies: Eyeworks; SVT
- Distributed by: Nordisk Film
- Release date: 25 December 2012 (Sweden)
- Running time: 95 minutes
- Country: Sweden
- Language: Swedish

The Anderssons in Greece (Swedish: Sune i Grekland) is a Swedish children's comedy film which was released to cinemas in Sweden on 25 December 2012, and originally planned for 2011 and thought to be set in Cyprus and not Greece. The film is based on the book Sune i Grekland of the Sune book series and was recorded in Rhodos Sunwing Resort Kallithea and in Stockholm.

The film was seen by more than 500,000.

== Premise ==
The Andersson's family go on a vacation to Greece, travelling there by aeroplane.

== Actors ==
- William Ringström - Sune
- Morgan Alling - Rudolf
- Anja Lundqvist - Karin
- Julius Jimenez Hugoson - Håkan
- Hanna Elffors Elfström - Anna
- Julia Dufvenius - Sabina
- Erik Johansson - Pontus
- Feline Andersson - Hedda
- Kajsa Halldén - Sophie
- Madeleine Barwén Trollvik - Idol-Lisa
- Anna-Maria Dahl - Linda
- Gustav Levin - Ralf
- Sofia Rönnegård - security guard
- Ann-Charlotte Franzén tour guide
- Manos Gavras - hotel boss
- Vangelis Petras - Costas
- Panagiotis Roditis - Yiannis
- Georgios Nikolis - headwaiter
- Jesper Jarnsäter - waiter

== Production ==
Shooting began in late-May 2012 in Kallithea at Rhodos. The Sweden scenes were shot in Västerås.

== Home video ==
The film was released to DVD and Blu-ray in 2013.
