= Normelli =

Normelli is a surname. Notable people with the surname include:

- Edith Bideau Normelli (1888–1958), American singer and educator
- Anna Herdenstam (born 1965), Swedish model, journalist, and television host, previously Anna Normelli
