= Algirdas Paulavičius =

Algirdas Paulavičius may refer to:

- Algirdas Paulavičius (actor) (1943—2020), Lithuanian actor
- Algirdas Paulavičius (musician) (1945—2007), Russian conductor, composer, music teacher and multi-instrumentalist
