= De ä bar å åk =

Song by Swedish alpine ski team

from the album Vi åk bättre da för da
- Language: Swedish
- Released: February 1976
- Genre: popular music
- Label: Metronome
- Songwriters: Bosse Carlgren, Billy Gezon and Mats Westman

"De ä bar å åk" (Northern Swedish dialect for "You just go") is a song written by Bosse Carlgren, Billy Gezon and Mats Westman, and used as a fight song for the Swedish alpine ski team, featuring Ingemar Stenmark, Stig Strand, Calle Briandt and Jan Green. It was released as a 1976 single together with "Vi åk bättre da för da" (Northern Swedish dialect for "We go better day for day").

The song title refers to "De ä bar å åk", a quotation credited to Swedish alpine skier Ingemar Stenmark when answering a journalist's question in a radio interview when asked what he did to win.

The song charted at Svensktoppen for five weeks between 24 April-22 May 1976, where it peaked at 3rd.

The song also appears in the 2014 film The Anderssons Rock the Mountains.

== Charts ==
Chart (1976–1977)	Peak position
Sweden (Sverigetopplistan)	19
