= Oredsson =

Oredsson is a surname. Notable people with the surname include:

- Thomas Oredsson (born 1946), Swedish actor and comedian
- Vera Oredsson (born 1928), Swedish Nazi politician
