= White Water Fury =

- Theatrical release poster
- Swedish: Järngänget
- Directed by: Jon Lindström
- Written by: Mats Gustavsson; Rita Holst; Jon Lindström
- Produced by: Lennart Dunér
- Starring: Emil Forselius; Rafael Edholm; Alexander Skarsgård
- Cinematography: Jens Fischer
- Edited by: Darek Hodor
- Music by: Patrik Frisk
- Production company: Cinetofon
- Distributed by: United International Pictures; Scanbox
- Release date: 7 April 2000
- Country: Sweden
- Language: Swedish

White Water Fury (Swedish: Järngänget, lit. "The Iron Gang") is a 2000 Swedish thriller film directed by Jon Lindström, and starring Emil Forselius, Rafael Edholm, and Alexander Skarsgård.

== Plot ==
White Water Fury follows four men on a kayaking trip. Later on in the journey they meet the two sisters: Marie and Susanne. They decide to camp together and after a wild night the youngest sister Susanne is gone. While the men go back to their everyday lives, Marie is worried about where her sister has gone. The canoe that belonged to the sisters is found crushed on the river a short distance from the campsite. Järngänget, as the men call themselves, become more nervous and start to question each other's stories as to what really happened that fateful night.

== Cast ==
- Emil Forselius as Lukas
- Rafael Edholm as Simon
- Alexander Skarsgård as Anders
- Peter Lorentzon as John
- Yaba Holst as Marie
- Josephine Bornebusch as Susanne
- Per Oscarsson as Åke
- Marika Lagercrantz as Lindberg
- Agneta Ekmanner as mother
- Görel Crona as Stina
- Bill Skarsgård as Klasse
- Marie Ahl as Astrid
- Thomas Oredsson as Harald
- Göran Forsmark as municipal chairman

== Production and release ==
Directed by Jon Lindstrom, it was released on April 7, 2000. Bill Skasrgard, in his feature film appearance, plays the younger brother, age 9, of Alexander Skarsgard's character, his real brother.
