= Nödinge Church =

Coordinates: 57°53′26″N 12°3′33″E

- Nödinge kyrka
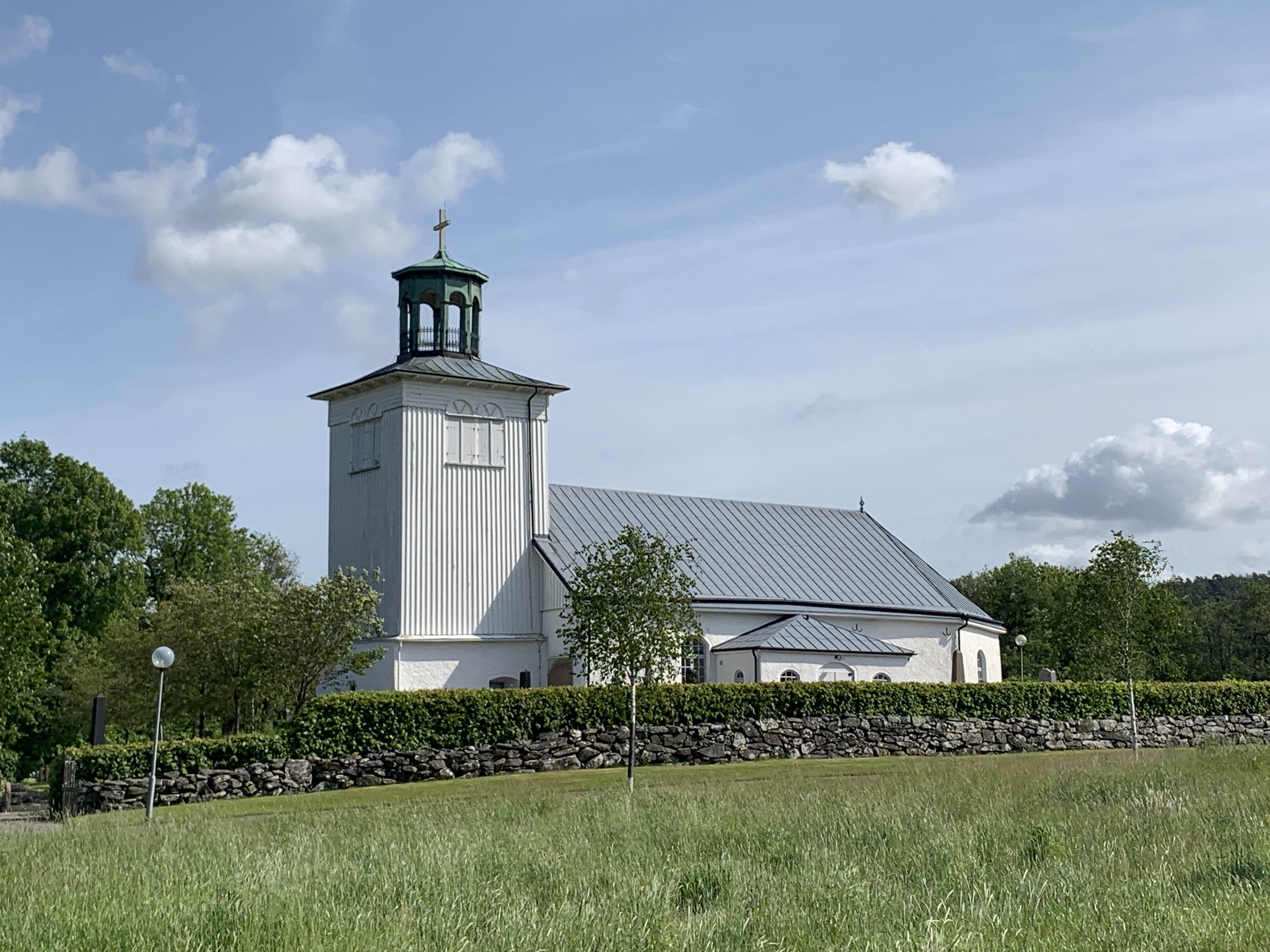
- Nödinge Church in 2025
- Nödinge Church
- Location: Nödinge-Nol
- Country: Sweden
- Denomination: Church of Sweden

History
- Consecrated: 1727

Administration
- Diocese: Gothenburg
- Parish: Nödinge

Nödinge Church (Swedish: Nödinge kyrka) is a church in Nödinge-Nol in Västergötland, Sweden, about 2 miles (3.2 km) north of Gothenburg. The current church was built in 1727, replacing an older Romanesque church from the 12th or 13th century. The church has a fine baroque interior, with ceiling paintings by master painter Alexander Fox added in 1734. The pulpit was added in 1741 by the sculptor Johan Petter Weber. It underwent extensive renovation in 1981-1982.

The church has been used, among other things, for the filming of the 2013 movie The Anderssons Hit the Road.
