= FLX =

Swedish production company

FLX is a comedy production company in Sweden in the areas of TV, commercials and feature films. The company is owned by Felix Herngren, Pontus Edgren, Niclas Carlsson and Bonnier Growth Media.

FLX produces well-known productions like the Swedish TV-hit Solsidan, Torpederna, Boy Machine, Welcome to Sweden and the film adaptation of the best-selling novel The Hundred-Year-Old Man Who Climbed Out the Window and Disappeared.

After the success on the national market, FLX now brings their productions to an international stage. The Solsidan format was recently optioned in the U.S and The Hundred-Year-Old Man Who Climbed Out the Window and Disappeared got an impressive distribution agreement with StudioCanal during 2013 and has so far been sold to almost 50 countries. The TV series Welcome to Sweden, with cameo appearances by famous actors, Amy Poehler and Will Ferrell, was also picked up by the American network NBC.
