= Ice storm (disambiguation) =

An ice storm is a type of storm characterized by freezing rain.

Ice Storm or Icestorm may also refer to:

- The Ice Storm (novel), a 1994 novel by Rick Moody
- The Ice Storm (film), a 1997 film directed by Ang Lee, adapting the 1994 novel
- IceStorm, an open-source toolchain for iCE (FPGA) devices
- Icestorm, a low power CPU core design implemented in the Apple A14 and Apple M1 processors
- "The Ice Storm", or the Great Ice Storm of 1998

== See also ==
- List of ice storms
- Great Ice Storm
- Ice (disambiguation)
- Storm (disambiguation)
- Winter storm (disambiguation)
- Snowstorm (disambiguation)
- Hailstorm (disambiguation)
