= Canelloni, Macaroni =

Single by Lasse Holm

from the album Canelloni, Macaroni
- A-side: "Canelloni, Macaroni"
- B-side: "Another Kind of Loving" ("E' de' det här du kallar kärlek")
- Released: 1986
- Genre: schlager
- Label: Mariann Grammofon
- Songwriter: Lasse Holm

"Canelloni, Macaroni" is a song written by Lasse Holm, and recorded by him released as a single in 1986.

The song chartered at Svensktoppen for 13 weeks between 18 May and 12 October 1986, even topping the chart.

The song was also performed in the TV programme Razzel, and was originally written with lyrics in English. But arranger Lennart Sjöholm wanted the song to be in Italian, as it included arias. Lasse Holm then went to different pizzerias reading menus over Italian food. Bert Karlsson wanted the song for Melodifestivalen, which never occurred, and the song became popular at pizzerias.

A video was also recorded. Four cranes were used, and the cameras rolled over long tables with Lasse Holm singing wearing a white suit. In an Adressändring commercial, Lasse Holm stated that he came up with the lyrics when getting an advertising flyer from a pizzeria, but first thought it was proposed song lyrics, which he had ordered. Soprano Åse Enhamre also participated in the recording.

The song also appears in the 2014 film The Anderssons Rock the Mountains.
