= Jens Hultén =

Swedish actor (born 1963)

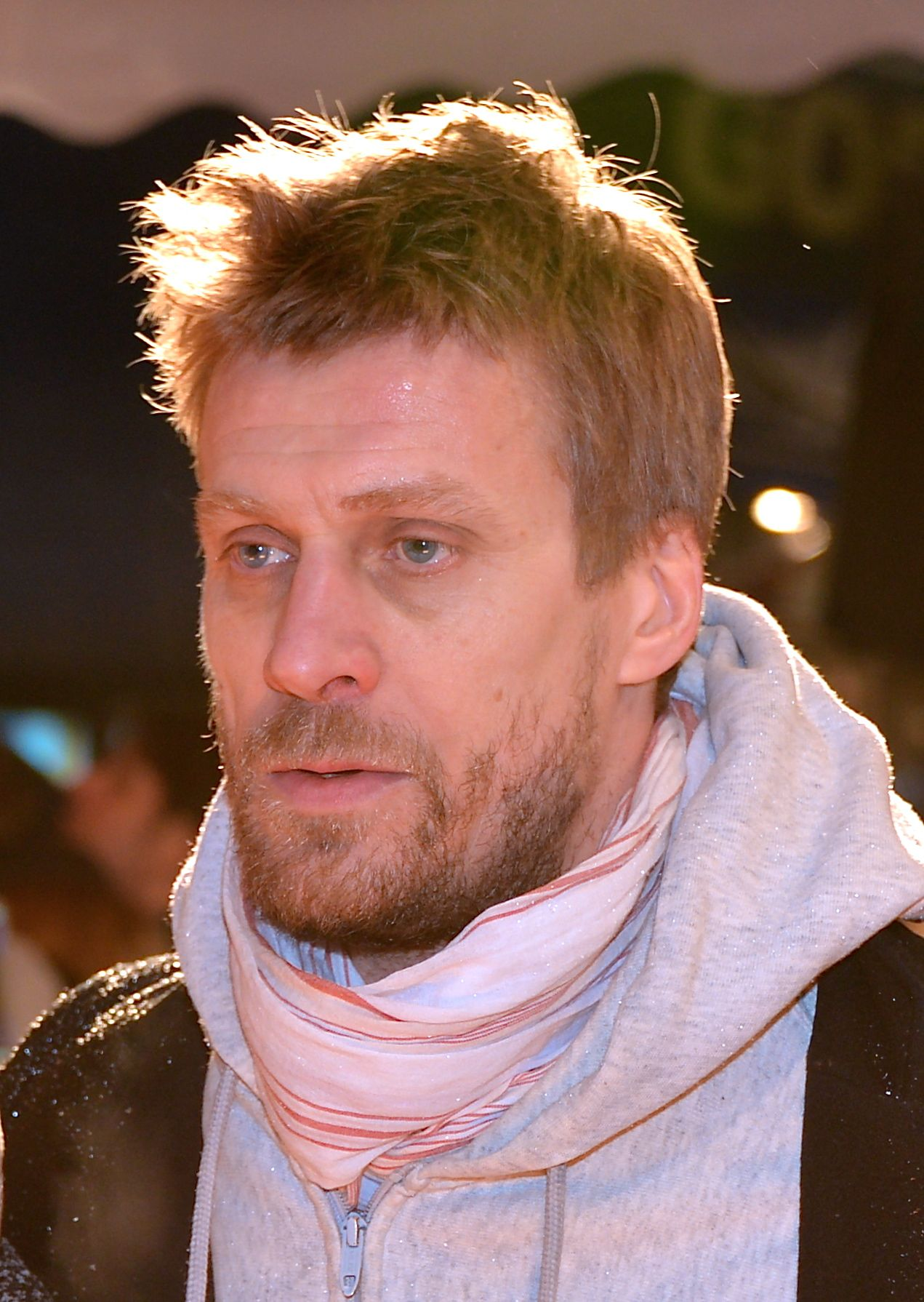
- Hultén in 2012
- Born: Jens Charley Hultén; 6 December 1963 (age 62); Stockholm, Sweden
- Occupations: Actor, filmmaker
- Years active: 1997–present

Jens Charley Hultén (born 6 December 1963) is a Swedish actor.

He is mainly known in Sweden for his work in television crime dramas, notably Graven and its sequel Morden, as well as his part in Kommissarie Winter based on bestselling crime writer Åke Edwardson's novels. Another of his notable roles was as the gangster Seth Rydell in the Johan Falk films, next to Joel Kinnaman. Perhaps his best-known English-speaking role was Janik "the Bone Doctor" Vinter, opposite Tom Cruise in the film Mission: Impossible – Rogue Nation

Hultén also appeared in the 2012 Bond film Skyfall as the henchman who fought with Bond under the frozen lake.

== Filmography ==
Film
Year	Title	Role	Notes	Ref.
1997	Under ytan	Lasse		
2001	Farligt förflutet	Stefan		
2001	Blå måndag	Bankchefen		
2003	At Point Blank	Piketbefäl Mattsson		
2005	Som man bäddar	Helge		
2005	Made in Yugoslavia	Class teacher Göran		
2006	Lilla Jönssonligan & stjärnkuppen	Loket		
2009	Johan Falk: Gruppen för särskilda insatser	Seth Rydell		
2009	Snarveien	Gunnar		
2009	Johan Falk: Vapenbröder	Seth Rydell		
2009	Johan Falk: National Target	Seth Rydell		
2011	Gränsen	Hagman		
2012	Johan Falk: Kodnamn: Lisa	Seth Rydell		
2012	Skyfall	Silva's Henchman #1		
2013	Gåten Ragnarok	Vikingkongen		
2013	The Hundred-Year-Old Man Who Climbed Out the Window and Disappeared	Gäddan		
2015	Jönssonligan – Den perfekta stöten	Krantz		
2015	Mission: Impossible – Rogue Nation	Janik Vinter		
2015	LasseMajas detektivbyrå - Stella Nostra	Grisini		
2016	The 101-Year-Old Man Who Skipped Out on the Bill and Disappeared	Gäddan		
2017	95	Curt Lindström		
2018	Alpha	Xi		
Television
Year	Title	Role	Notes	Ref.
2003	Norrmalmstorg	Hasse	TV movie	
2004-2005	Graven	Theo Koders	8 episodes	
2005-2009	Wallander	Lindström / Torgeir	2 episodes	
2006	Beck	Frank Boder	1 episode	
2007	Höök	Johan Ek	11 episodes	
2008	Oskyldigt dömd	Tore	1 episode	
2009	Morden	Theo	6 episodes	
2017	Hassel	Leon Forsberg	7 episodes	
2018	Systrar 1968	Georg	3 episodes	
2020, 2022	Bäckström	Tomas Eriksson	11 episodes	
