= Solsidan (TV series) =

- Title screen from the second season.
- Genre: Comedy
- Created by: Felix Herngren; Ulf Kvensler; Jacob Seth Fransson; Pontus Edgren
- Written by: Felix Herngren; Ulf Kvensler; Jacob Seth Fransson; Pontus Edgren
- Directed by: Ulf Kvensler; Felix Herngren
- Starring: Felix Herngren; Mia Skäringer; Johan Rheborg; Mona Malm; Josephine Bornebusch; Henrik Dorsin
- Country of origin: Sweden
- Original language: Swedish
- No. of seasons: 9
- No. of episodes: 90

Production
- Executive producers: Jessica Ericstam; Catherine Wiernik
- Producer: Kerstin Andersson
- Production location: Saltsjöbaden
- Running time: 23 minutes
- Production companies: Jarowskij; FLX

Original release
- Network: TV4.
- Release: 29 January 2010 – present

Solsidan (lit. "The Sunny Side") is a Swedish television comedy series that premiered on 29 January 2010 on TV4. The series is named after a small part of Saltsjöbaden called Solsidan. It revolves around Alex (Felix Herngren) and Anna (Mia Skäringer) who are expecting their first child together and have just moved to Alex's childhood home in Saltsjöbaden, Stockholm County. Alex tries to get Anna to enjoy herself, and at the same time spend time with his childhood friend Fredde (Johan Rheborg). Ten episodes were scheduled to air in the first season. A second ten-episode season premiered on 16 January 2011.

== Plot and characters ==
Alex Löfström (Felix Herngren) is a 39-year-old dentist who moves back to his childhood home in posh Saltsjöbaden with his girlfriend Anna Svensson (Mia Skäringer). They are expecting their first child. Anna works as an actress and feels alienated in Alex's hometown. She does everything she can to fit in. Alex's mother Margareta (Mona Malm) sold the house to Alex and Anna, but thinks she is still entitled to drop by whenever she wants. Alex is reunited with his childhood friend Fredrik "Fredde" Schiller (Johan Rheborg), who lives in one of the town's fanciest houses with his wife Mikaela "Mickan" (Josephine Bornebusch) and their two children. Ove Sundberg (Henrik Dorsin) is another one of Alex's childhood friends and is seen as the most annoying person in Saltsjöbaden. He lives with his greedy and pushy wife Anette (Malin Cederbladh).

== Production ==
The cast of Solsidan, from left to right: Mia Skäringer, Felix Herngren, Felix Herngren and Josephine Bornebusch

Solsidan was created by Herngren, Seth Fransson, Kvensler and Edgren and produced by Jarowskij and FLX, which is owned by Felix Herngren, Niclas Carlsson and Pontus Edgren. The series was directed by Herngren, Jacob Seth-Fransson, and Ulf Kvensler, and written by Herngren, Kvensler, Seth-Franson, and Pontus Edgren. According to Herngren, they had for a long time thought it "would be fun to do a more venturing series where script and characters got a bit more time to develop, and now we got the chance to do that for TV4." Herngren has described Solsidan as a free-standing sequel to his films Vuxna människor and Varannan vecka, and much of the series is inspired by events in his and his friend's lives.

Herngren confirmed that he and Rheborg would appear in the series in July 2008. Filming began in the spring of 2009 and finished in June. Much of it was recorded near the sea in the locality of Saltsjöbaden, where the show takes place. In June 2009 Skäringer confirmed that she was playing one of the lead roles. During filming, she commented that "we have so much fun all the time, so we have to struggle to avoid laughing [while recording scenes]." Skäringer has also noted that she had never met Herngren before Solsidan, but that they have "the same tone in [their] acting and work well together." Fredrik Arefalk, TV4's program director, called the series a "modern comedy with sharp humor" and commented that he was "extremely proud and happy" that they had managed to gather some of Sweden's "foremost comedy profiles" for it. It was announced on 3 December 2010 that the script for the series had been sold to the American television network ABC who plans to create their own version of the series in the U.S.

== Reception ==
The first episode of Solsidan, which aired on 29 January 2010, was viewed by 1,840,000 people. It was the fourth highest-watched series in Sweden that week, following Antikrundan, På spåret, and Mästarnas mästare. It was the most-watched series on TV4 and beat Let's Dance, which had 1,675,000 viewers. The second-season premiere aired on 16 January 2011 and was a huge success for TV4. It was viewed by more than 2,500,000 people which makes it, apart from two episodes of Let's Dance and some sports broadcasts, the channel's highest viewing figure of the 2000s.

== Seasons ==
Season	Episodes	First aired	Season finale	Summary
Season 1	10	29 January 2010	9 April 2010	Alex is a 39-year-old dentist, who moves back to his childhood home in Saltsjöbaden, Stockholm with his common-law wife Anna. Together they are expecting their first child. Anna is an actress and feels herself as an outsider in Alex's hometown. Alex's mom, Margareta, sold the house to them, but thinks that she still lives there. Fredde, Alex's childhood friend and a successful businessman, lives in Solsidan's poshest house with his homemaking wife Mickan and two kids. Ove Sundberg is another one of Alex's childhood friends who is believed to be the most boring and thrifty resident in Solsidan.
Season 2	10	14 January 2011	18 March 2011	Anna and Alex get married, and Anna's parents are invited. Her father is an early retired pensioner with a low self-esteem and her mother is a self-centered 60-year-old former beauty queen. The wedding-day is a series of catastrophes, but the day ends well. Fredde and Mickan get a nanny and Anna starts working as a masseuse.
Season 3	10	7 October 2012	9 December 2012	Anna and Alex are expecting their second child and finally buy their dream home. But a blown kitchen crashes their happiness, and they are forced out to the contractors as it is unable to get fixed, and one of Alex's unpleasant relatives pops up. Freddes and Mickan's son Victor has recently started school and struggles to cope with it, and the two worry about his future. In desire for a third child, Mickan goes to a medium. Ove suspects that his wife Anette is about to leave him and struggles to win her back, but continues to irritate Alex.
Season 4	10	20 October 2013	22 December 2013	
Season 5	10	18 October 2015	20 December 2015	Mickan gets tired as a housewife and yearns to stand on her own two feet. She opens the beauty salon Top Notch with Lussan, and Fredde becomes worried about what is she more tired of. Their relationship problems get worse and they end up with a anything except an educational relationship counselor. Ove has been given a new job in Norway, and he travels constantly, much to Anette's dismay, but still has sex on Skype. Ove also finds an unexpected source of extra income in connection with his business travels. Anna and Alex simmer on that they are happy together. Anna is working to breathe life into her acting career and gets a role as a cop in a new crime drama. At the same time, she begins to realize that she may no longer be a center-left Green Party supporter but leaning more towards to the conservative Blue block.
Season 6	10	20 October 2019	22 December 2019	
Season 7	10	17 October 2021	19 December 2021	
Season 8	10	15 October 2023	17 December 2023	
Season 9	TBA	TBA	TBA	
Season 10	TBA	TBA	TBA	
