= Thomas Oredsson =

Swedish actor and comedian (born 1946)

Lars Thomas Ored Oredsson (born 19 December 1946, in Stockholm) is a Swedish actor and comedian. He studied at Calle Flygare Teaterskola and Swedish National Academy of Mime and Acting.

== Selected filmography ==
- 1978 – Bomsalva
- 1980 – Der Mann, der sich in Luft auflöste
- 1987 – Varuhuset (TV series)
- 1990 – Den svarta cirkeln (TV series)
- 1991 – Barnens detektivbyrå
- 1992 – Hassel – De giriga
- 1994 – Tre Kronor (TV series)
- 2000 – Järngänget
- 2000 – Judith (TV series)
- 2005 – Van Veeteren – Carambole
- 2006 – Van Veeteren – Moreno och tystnaden
- 2007 – Beck – I guds namn
- 2007 – Beck – Gamen
- 2014 – Crimes of Passion (TV series)
- 2017–2020 – Rebecka Martinsson (TV series)
