= Dagny Carlsson =

Swedish blogger and influencer (1912–2022)

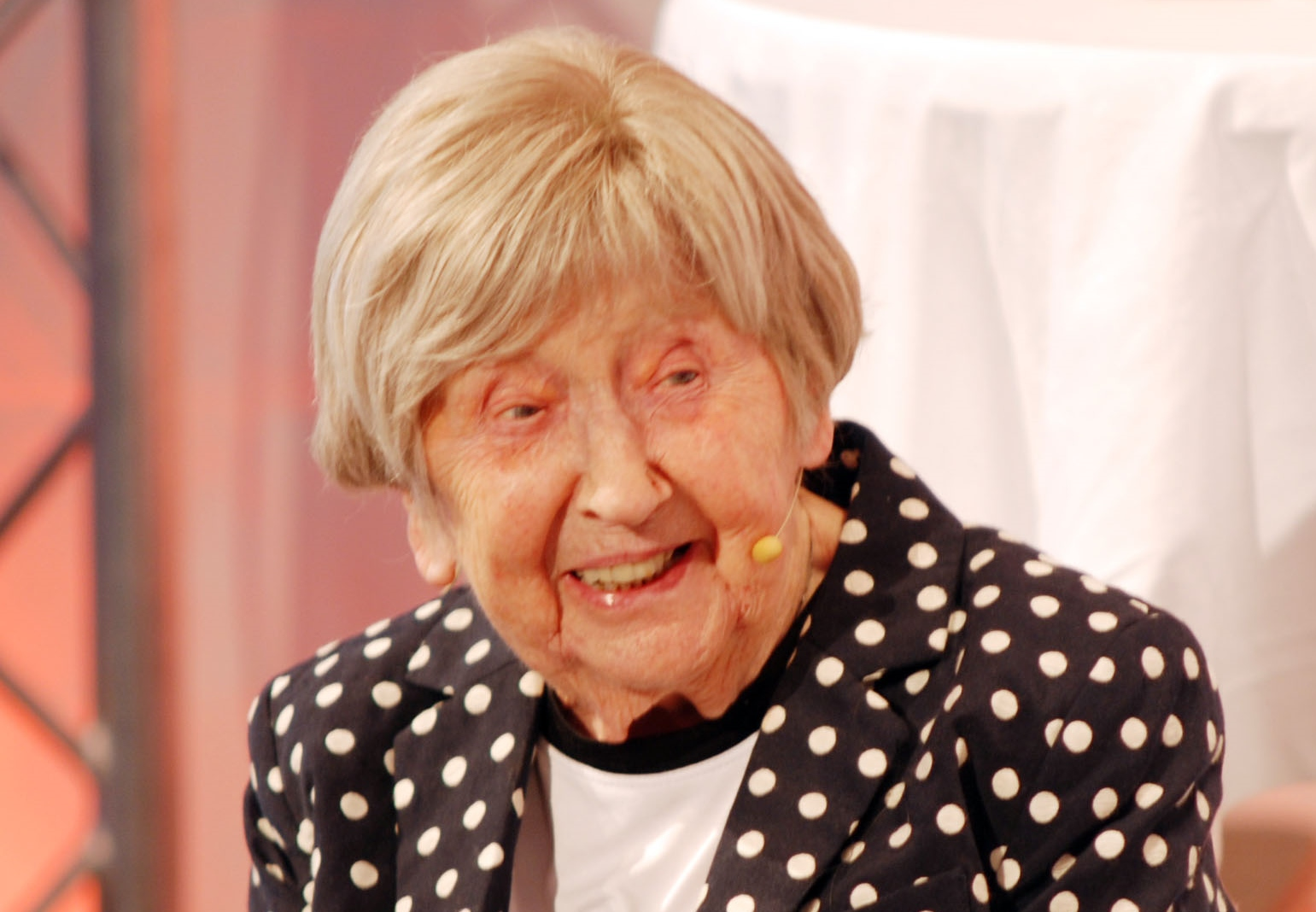
- Carlsson in 2013
- Born: Dagny Valborg Eriksson; 8 May 1912; Kristianstad, Sweden
- Died: 24 March 2022 (aged 109); Solna, Sweden
- Other names: Bojan
- Occupations: Blogger; seamstress; influencer; employee at the Swedish Social Insurance Agency
- Spouses: Ragnar Norling (m. 1942–1951); Harry Carlsson (m. 1951; died 2004)

Dagny Valborg Carlsson (née Eriksson, 8 May 1912 – 24 March 2022) was a Swedish blogger and influencer.

== Biography ==
=== Life and blogging ===
Carlsson, who called herself "Bojan" (a diminutive variant of Valborg) on her blog, started working as a seamstress at a factory at a young age. She would later study at a textile institute in Norrköping. Carlsson became work leader at a corset factory in Sundbyberg, and, for the last fifteen years of her career, she worked at the Swedish Social Insurance Agency.

She took a class in computing at the age of 99, and at the age of 100 she became known in the media for her age and her blogging. She credited good genes and curiosity for living a long life.

=== TV and film appearances, radio presenting ===
Carlsson participated in several TV shows such as TV4's Nyhetsmorgon, SVT's Fråga doktorn, Gomorron Sverige and the SVT documentary series Det är inte så dumt att bli gammal. She was also a guest on the Nordic talk show Skavlan on 4 March 2016 as well as TV4's Bingolotto game show.

In 2013, at age 101, Carlsson had a small role in the film The Hundred-Year-Old Man Who Climbed Out of the Window and Disappeared, in which she played an elderly woman who has moved into the 100-year-old protagonist's abandoned room at the retirement home. In 2016, Carlsson published the book Livet enligt Dagny : I huvudet på en 104-åring (Life According to Dagny: Inside the Head of a 104 Year Old) a book about her life. In June 2017, Dagny Carlsson presented an episode of Sommar i P1 on Sveriges Radio. In December the same year, she presented an episode of the radio show Vinter i P1 on Sveriges Radio.

Carlsson also appeared in two SVT documentaries about her life, in 2015 Dagny – Livet börjar vid 100 (Dagny – Life starts at 100) and in 2019, Dagny – om jag sätter mig ner nu dör jag (Dagny – If I Sit Down Now I Will Die).

== Personal life ==
Carlsson was married to Ragnar Norling (1909–1958), from 1942 to 1951. She was married to Harry Carlsson (1913–2004) from 1951, until his death from cancer in 2004.

She supported the Me Too movement.

== Death ==
Dagny Carlsson died on 24 March 2022, at the age of 109, less than two months before she would have attained supercentenarian status. At the time of her death, she was one of the oldest people in Sweden.

== Bibliography ==
- 2016 – Livet enligt Dagny: I huvudet på en 104-åring. Månpocket. 2016. ISBN 9789175037363
