= Every Other Week =

Varannan vecka
- Swedish cover
- Directed by: Måns Herngren; Felix Herngren; Hannes Holm; Hans Ingemansson
- Written by: Måns Herngren; Felix Herngren; Hannes Holm; Hans Ingemansson
- Produced by: Patrick Ryborn
- Starring: Måns Herngren; Felix Herngren; Cecilia Frode; Anja Lundqvist
- Production company: S/S Fladen
- Distributed by: Buena Vista International
- Release date: 13 January 2006 (Sweden)
- Running time: 97 minutes
- Language: Swedish

Every Other Week (Swedish: Varannan vecka) is a Swedish comedy/drama film, released in 2006 and directed by Måns Herngren, Felix Herngren, Hannes Holm and Hans Ingemansson. The film also stars Måns and Felix Herngren, amongst others.

== Plot ==
The films is about Pontus (F. Herngren) who likes his "every other week" life. One week he is a responsible father to his daughter, and the other week when his ex-wife has his daughter, he parties all the time. Pontus bigger brother, Jens (M. Herngren), is the complete opposite. He has three children and has been happily married for 20 years. But one day, the whole marriage collapses for Jens, and he is forced to move to Pontus. Over one night, their lives change radically.

== Cast ==
- Måns Herngren - Jens
- Felix Herngren - Pontus
- Cecilia Frode - Johanna
- Anja Lundqvist - Maria
- Anna Björk - Tessan
