= Hailstorm (disambiguation) =

A hailstorm is a thunderstorm that produces hail.

Hailstorm may also refer to:

- Hailstorm (Ross the Boss album), 2010
- Microsoft HailStorm, the codename for a Microsoft service
- Hailstorm, a 1994 album by Barathrum
- Hailstorm, a cell-site simulator made by Harris Corporation

== See also ==
- Halestorm, an American rock band
  - Halestorm (album), their debut album
