= Iwar Wiklander =

Swedish actor (born 1939)

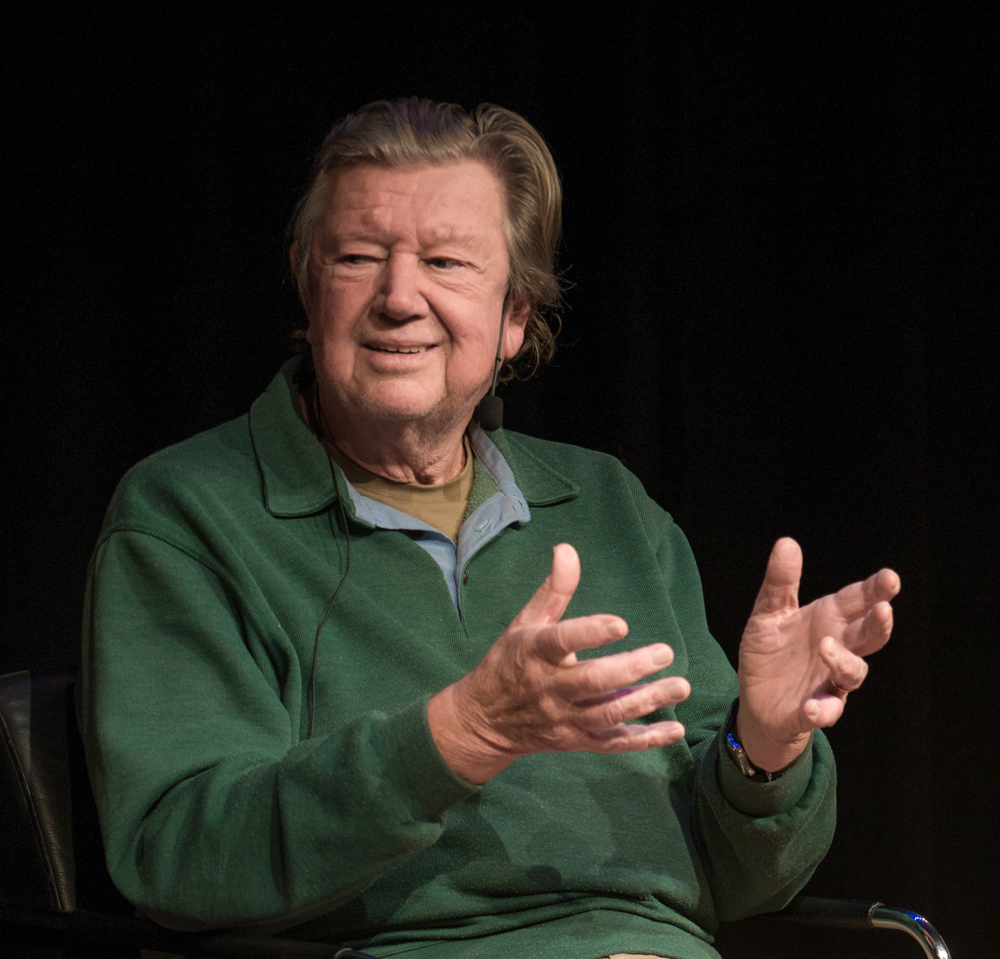
- Iwar Wiklander in 2016.
- Born: 30 May 1939 (age 86); Gothenburg, Sweden
- Occupation: Actor
- Years active: 1963-present

Iwar Wiklander (born 30 May 1939) is a Swedish actor. He has appeared in more than fifty films since 1963.

== Selected filmography ==
Year	Title	Role	Notes
1983	A Hill on the Dark Side of the Moon		
2004	Four Shades of Brown		
2012	Simon and the Oaks		
2013	Easy Money III: Life Deluxe		
2014	The Hundred-Year-Old Man Who Climbed Out of the Window and Disappeared		
