= Hannes Holm =

Swedish director and screenwriter (born 1962)

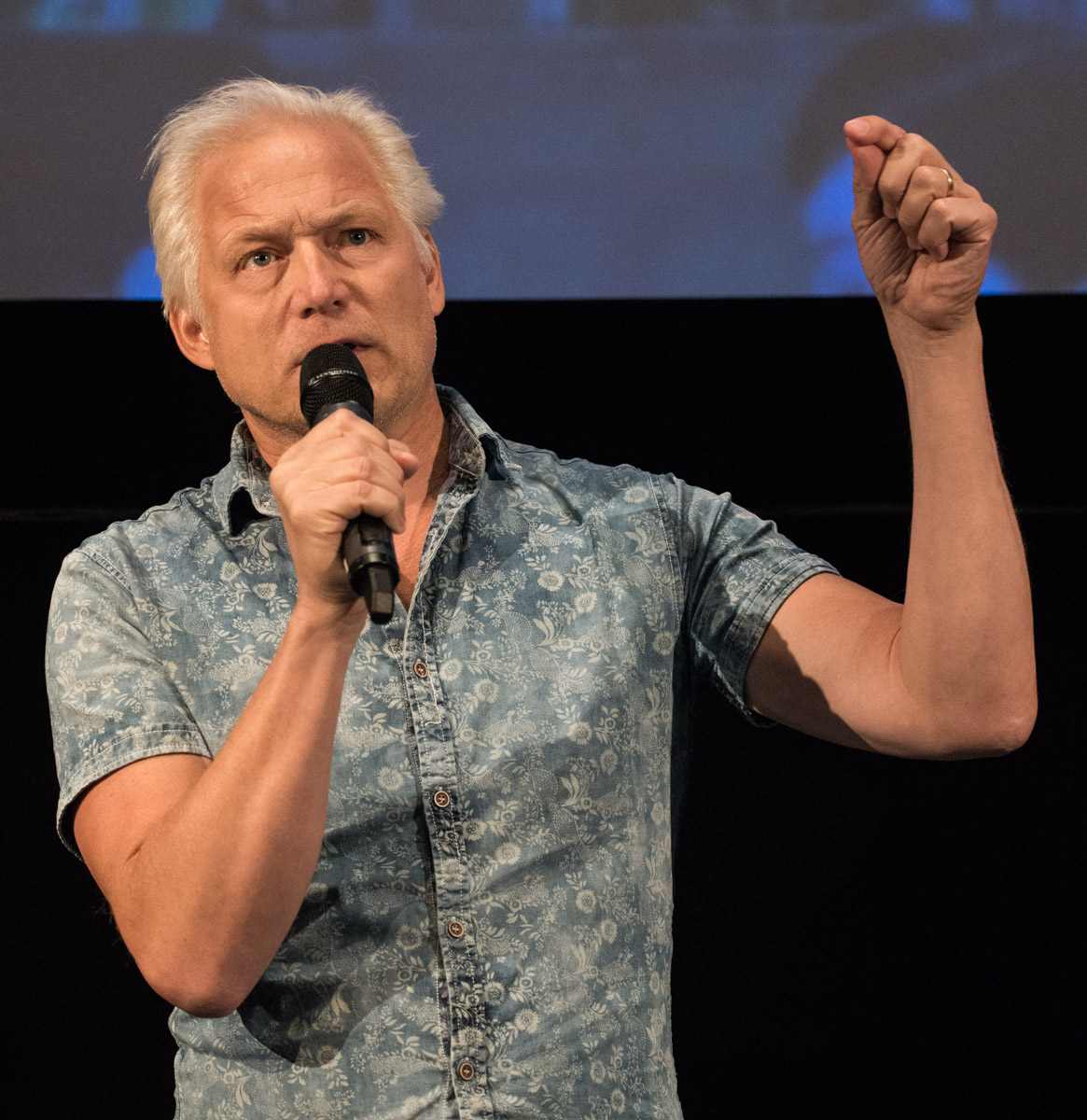
- Hannes Holm during a presentation in Filmhuset of the film A Man Called Ove 2015.
- Born: Hannes Martin Holm; 26 November 1962 (age 63); Lidingö, Sweden
- Occupations: Director, Screenwriter
- Years active: 1983-present

Hannes Martin Holm (born 26 November 1962 in Lidingö), is a Swedish director and screenwriter. He makes almost all of his films with Måns Herngren.

Holm and Herngren's Adam & Eva was the highest-grossing film in Sweden in 1997, grossing $5.4 million. Afterwards, he and Herngren formed their own production company AS Fladen. Det blir aldrig som man tänkt sig was their third hit and also topped the Swedish box office.

== Selected filmography ==
- 1983 - Interrail
- 1983 - Vidöppet (Wide Open) (TV-series)
- 1985 - Förspelet (The Fore Play) (TV-series)
- 1987 - Bröderna Olsson (The Olsson Brothers) (TV-series)
- 1990 - S*M*A*S*H (TV-series)
- 1995 - One in a Million (En på miljonen)
- 1997 - Adam & Eva
- 2000 - Det blir aldrig som man tänkt sig (Things Never End Up Like You've Planned or Shit Happens)
- 2002 - Klassfesten (The Class Reunion)
- 2006 - Varannan vecka (Every Other Week)
- 2007 - Underbar och älskad av alla (Wonderful And Loved By Everyone)
- 2010 - Behind Blue Skies
- 2014 - Himlen är oskyldigt blå
- 2012 - The Anderssons in Greece
- 2013 - The Anderssons Hit the Road
- 2014 - The Anderssons Rock the Mountains
- 2015 - A Man Called Ove
- 2018 - Ted – För kärlekens skull
- 2021 - Sagan om Karl-Bertil Jonssons julafton
