= Tic Tac (film) =

- Theatrical release poster
- Directed by: Daniel Alfredson
- Written by: Hans Renhäll
- Produced by: Katinka Faragó
- Cinematography: Peter Mokrosinski
- Edited by: Håkan Karlsson
- Music by: Fläskkvartetten
- Release date: 31 October 1997 (Sweden)
- Running time: 96 minutes
- Country: Sweden
- Language: Swedish

Tic Tac is a Swedish psychological thriller film and drama film which was released to cinemas in Sweden on 31 October 1997, directed by Daniel Alfredson and written by Hans Renhäll, about various people involved in small crime during one day and night in Stockholm. The film won the Guldbagge Award for best film and was Sweden's submission for the Academy Award for Best Foreign Language Film, but failed to be nominated.

Some critics have called the film "a Swedish Pulp Fiction".

== Cast ==
- Oliver Loftéen as Micke
- Tuva Novotny as Jeanette
- Jacob Nordenson as Kent
- Tintin Anderzon as Ylva
- Emil Forselius as Lasse
- Mats Helin as Jorma
- Claudio Salgado as Pedro
- Nadja Weiss as Francesca
- Thomas Hanzon as Niklas
- Douglas Johansson as Tommy
- Franco Mariano as Giuseppe
- Michael Nyqvist as Vinni
- Hugo Ruiz as Manuel
- Gunvor Pontén as Rosita
- Bengt Blomgren as Gösta
- Barbro Kollberg as Edith
- Ewamaria Björkström-Roos as Zoe
- Gustaf Elander as Wikström
- Camilla Hellquist as receptionist
- Jesper Bergom-Larsson
- Henry Duhs as Benny

== Reception ==
Gunnar Rehlin of Variety called the film "A clever blend of the narrative styles of Short Cuts and Pulp Fiction, adding that "[it] is one of the most interesting films to come out of Sweden in a long time".

== Awards and nominations ==
The film won the Guldbagge Awards for Best Film, Best Direction and Best Supporting Actor (Emil Forselius). Hans Renhäll was nominated for Best Screenplay. It also won the Don Quijote Award and FIPRESCI Prize at the Karlovy Vary International Film Festival.

== See also ==
- List of submissions to the 70th Academy Awards for Best Foreign Language Film
- List of Swedish submissions for the Academy Award for Best Foreign Language Film
