= Emil Forselius =

Swedish actor

- Born: 23 November 1974; Västervik, Sweden
- Died: 1 March 2010 (aged 35); Stockholm, Sweden
- Occupation: Actor
- Years active: 1997–2010

Emil Forselius (23 November 1974 – 1 March 2010) was a Swedish actor. He graduated from the Swedish National Academy of Mime and Acting in 2002. He was awarded a Guldbagge Award for his role as Lasse in the film Tic Tac.

== Personal life ==
=== Death ===
Forselius was found dead in his Stockholm apartment in on 2 March 2010. He had left a farewell letter, and cause of death was determined to be suicide. Forselius had suffered from severe depression for some time.

== Filmography ==
- 2010 – Wallander – Indrivaren
- 2007 – Himmelblå
- 2006 – Hombres
- 2003 – Deadline-Torp
- 2003 – Belinder auktioner
- 2002 – Stora teatern
- 2001 – Deadline
- 2000 – Naken
- 2000 – White Water Fury
- 1998 – Beck – Vita nätter
- 1998 – The Last Contract
- 1997 – Tic Tac
