= Anna Herdenstam =

Anna Maria Ingeborg Herdenstam (née Magnusson; born 21 October 1965) is a fashion model, journalist and news anchor.

Herdenstam was born in Malmö, Sweden. She works at Expressen. She has also been a news anchor at TV4 Nyheterna. Herdenstam was stationed in the United States as the foreign correspondent for TV4 Nyheterna 2014–2015. She hosted Expressen TV's coverage from the US Presidential Election in 2016. Herdenstam has also reported live onsite from the terror attacks in Paris 2015, Brussels 2016 and Stockholm 2017.

In 2000, Herdenstam wrote along with Olle Bergman the book Den lilla sorgen: en bok om missfall.

Anna Herdenstam married film director Måns Herngren in 1988. In 2007, she got remarried and changed her last name from Normelli (which she had at the time) to Herdenstam. She is married to Mika Packalén since 2017.

== Bibliography ==
- 2000 – Den lilla sorgen: en bok om missfall
