= Adam & Eva =

- Directed by: Hannes Holm; Måns Herngren
- Written by: Hannes Holm; Måns Herngren
- Produced by: Waldemar Bergendahl
- Starring: Björn Kjellman; Josefin Nilsson
- Distributed by: AB Svensk Filmindustri
- Release date: 14 February 1997
- Running time: 99 minutes
- Country: Sweden
- Language: Swedish
- Budget: SEK 12,000,000
- Box office: SEK 41,276,863 (Sweden)

Adam & Eva is a 1997 Swedish romantic comedy film written and directed by Hannes Holm and Måns Herngren. Starring Björn Kjellman as Adam and Josefin Nilsson as Eva. The film tells the story about a married couple Adam and Eva and their various dreams of the future. Eva's thoughts about the house and kids is scaring Adam who fall into a life crisis. He is cheating with his brother's nanny, which leads to a divorce between him and Eva. He later realizes that he loves Eva and tries to win her back.

A sequel is being planned.

== Plot ==
A church is burning. Firefighters rescues several people from the fire. But left in the Church is Eva (Josefin Nilsson), a blonde girl dressed as the Saint Lucia. One of the firefighters, Adam (Björn Kjellman), returns to the church to save her. They unite in a kiss and the ending credits starts rolling. After the credits are done you hear Adam ask, "Is it over now?". Four years later, Adam is sitting at the breakfast table thinking that the relationship is routine. Everything is predictable. Eva wants a baby and buy a house but Adam is not willing to take responsibility. He is afraid of being a regular Joe as his brother Sven (Reine Brynolfsson). Adam and Eva celebrates midsummer with Sven's family and friends. A lot of people have their kids with them. Åke (Jacob Ericksson) starts singing songs with dirty lyrics. Sven stops him, whereupon Åke goes away in protest to sit down and talk with Eva. At night, Adam meets Sven's and his wife Kicki's (Katrin Sundberg) young nanny Jackie (Dubrilla Ekerlund).

Adam tells his friend Tove (Tintin Anderzon) he collided with Jackie, and that they spent a day together when Eva was out of town on a job in Copenhagen. The naive Jackie wants to be a writer and tries to act mature. The age difference becomes apparent during their dinner conversation. The two makes out at home in Adams sofa. Adam is out of condoms and take to the hunt for new ones. Adam and Eva is looking at a house to buy. The broker takes a call in the car and dies unexpectedly. Adam begins to reflect on the meaning of life. He runs back to Jackie with newly purchased condoms.

Eva tells Adam she turned down a job in Denmark for his sake, but Adam convinces her to go. That way he can meet Jackie more. Adam is going on a Christmas dinner with Eva's parents on Gotland. Eva's dad gives Adam the confidence to be Santa Claus. Adam calls and complains to Jackie, but Eve intercepts the call. When Adam comes in as Santa Claus, Eva reveals for the family that he has a mistress. Adam, returning home to Stockholm with a pork lip, goes back to Jackie. At her place there is already another male "friend" Sven-Olof. Adam spends the night with Tove, and later he moves in. She organizes a New Year's party, Adam learn that Eva has found a new guy, Åke from the midsummer party, and that they are together. Adam tries to kill himself by putting a bottle rocket in his mouth. All the rockets explode on the balcony. Adam goes to the ER with a burn blister on his finger.

Later, when Adam returns to the hospital, the female doctor won't give Adam any more pain killers but tells him to move on and leave on a trip with a friend to have fun. Adam takes the doctor with him to Copenhagen to try to have fun. He calls Eva and they meet at a pub. Eva wants to talk about the divorce and get Adam to sign the divorce papers. Adam is dressed up and want to take her out to dinner. Adam put up an act, but signs the paper finally. He runs after Eva screaming: "I love you!". Sad, he travels home with the doctor.

Adam's friends, relatives and colleagues talking about how Adam behaved after the divorce. He worked all the time, bought new clothes and picked up babes. In the summer meet Adam and Eva by a coincident. She offers him a free ticket to Åke's successful stand-up show. Adam and Tove goes on Åke's show. After the show is a party with the whole celebrity-Stockholm. Adam follows Eva home. She and Åke has moved into the house that Adam and Eva looked at before. Eva and Adam is about to kiss each other, when the door goes up and Tove and Åke enter. Eva says she is going to marry Åke. They once again meet on Eva's bachelorette party and wakes up in the same bed. Eva and Åke begins to discuss the wedding after a rehearsal in the church. Eva begins to say that she's feeling doubtful. But they later marry anyway.

Later, Adam sees Eva in a baby store. Eva is pregnant and Adam tells her that Tove is also pregnant. He and Tove have always been friends, but they have never been in love. They went on vacation and really made an effort to get to it without success. On the return trip, Tove felled in love with a steward who she is now living with. Eva says that it only lasted for six months with Åke. It began when she became pregnant, then the relationship became worse and worse. Among other things, she came at him with another. Åke still living in the house with his new love, a man. Adam and Eva is walking together. Adam looks back on their relationship and can not recall that they ever had the bad together. They kiss. Adam and Eve are sitting in the maternity ward with a newborn baby. Adam says: "He is like me."

== Cast ==
- Björn Kjellman as Adam
- Josefin Nilsson as Eva
- Tintin Anderzon as Tove
- Jacob Ericksson as Åke Braun
- Reine Brynolfsson as Sven, Adam's brother
- Katrin Sundberg as Kicki, Sven's wife
- Dubrilla Ekerlund as Jackie, the nanny

== Reception ==
Adam & Eva was the highest-grossing film in Sweden for the year, grossing $5.4 million..

== Awards and nominations ==
Tintin Anderzon won one Guldbagge Award for Best Supporting Actress. The film was nominated for Best Director, Best film, Best actor (Björn Kjellman) and Best Supporting Actor (Jacob Ericksson).
