= The Hundred-Year-Old Man Who Climbed Out of the Window and Disappeared (film) =

2013 comedy film

- Swedish theatrical film poster
- Swedish: Hundraåringen som klev ut genom fönstret och försvann
- Directed by: Felix Herngren
- Written by: Felix Herngren; Hans Ingemansson; Jonas Jonasson
- Based on: The Hundred-Year-Old Man Who Climbed Out the Window and Disappeared by Jonas Jonasson
- Starring: Robert Gustafsson
- Cinematography: Göran Hallberg
- Edited by: Henrik Källberg
- Music by: Matti Bye
- Production companies: NICE FLX Pictures; Nordsvensk Filmunderhallning; TV4; Film i Väst; Tele Munchen Gruppe; Wild Bunch; C More Entertainment; StudioCanal; Svenska Filminstitutet; Nordisk Film & TV Fond
- Distributed by: Buena Vista International (Sweden); StudioCanal (France); Concorde Filmverleih (Germany)
- Release date: 25 December 2013
- Running time: 112 minutes
- Countries: Sweden; France; Germany
- Languages: Swedish; English; Russian; German; French; Spanish
- Budget: 63 million SEK ($9.6 million)
- Box office: $51.2 million

The Hundred-Year-Old Man Who Climbed Out of the Window and Disappeared (Swedish: Hundraåringen som klev ut genom fönstret och försvann), also known as The 100-Year-Old Man Who Climbed Out the Window and Disappeared, is a 2013 internationally co-produced comedy film directed by Felix Herngren based on the 2009 novel of the same name by Jonas Jonasson. The film was screened in the Berlinale Special Gala section of the 64th Berlin International Film Festival.

The film was released in more than 40 countries and grossed more than US$50 million, making it the third highest grossing Swedish film of all time, only beaten by The Girl With the Dragon Tattoo (Män som hatar kvinnor) and The Girl Who Played with Fire (Flickan som lekte med elden).

The film was nominated for the Academy Award for Best Makeup and Hairstyling at the 88th Academy Awards. A sequel, titled The 101-Year-Old Man Who Skipped Out on the Bill and Disappeared, was released in 2016.

== Plot ==
In 2005, Allan Karlsson lives alone with his pet cat Molotov as his only company. When Molotov is killed by a fox, an enraged Allan gets revenge by blowing up the fox using dynamite, which prompts the authorities to move him to a retirement home in Malmköping. On the same day as his centenary celebration, Allan climbs out of the window and disappears, walking to the bus station intending on traveling as far as he can. While waiting for his bus, a young skinhead angrily demands Allan watch his suitcase whilst he uses the toilet. When the bus arrives, Allan leaves with the suitcase, and travels to the remote location of Byringe. By the time he leaves Malmköping, his carers have informed the police of his disappearance, and Inspector Aronsson is investigating, unaware of the suitcase in Allan's possession.

In Byringe, Allan is helped by recluse Julius Jonsson, who helps him fight off the pursuing gangsters to whom the suitcase belongs. While fleeing the scene, Allan and Julius catch a lift from Benny, an insecure young man, and all three find their way to a smallholding where Gunilla lives with her pet elephant, Sonja. The gangsters meet their individual deaths through misadventure, apart from Gäddan, their violent boss, who loses his memory after an accident and becomes part of the group.

Parts of the film co-exist with the main story as a series of flashbacks in Allan's life. In his childhood, Allan's father invents the condom, an invention that was seen by the Swedish monarchy as blasphemous. Enraged, Allan's father travels to Russia after the Russian Revolution to set up his own republic and support his invention, only to be executed by firing squad. While still young, Allan's sick mother eventually dies, but her final words to him are never to think or talk too much. In her words, she tells Allan that "That is what it is, and that it will be what it will be".

In his youth, Allan is sent to a mental hospital after accidentally blowing up a local butcher who swindled his mother. Upon being released as an adult, Allan finds work at a cannon foundry, where he befriends Esteban, a Spanish revolutionary. The talkative Esteban convinces Allan to go with him to Spain to fight the Nationalist regime under Francisco Franco. Esteban is immediately killed, reminding Allan of his mother's warnings about talking too much. Allan's expertise in explosives makes his job of blowing up bridges crucial to the Republican forces. However, moments before destroying a bridge, Allan's love of explosives suddenly palls and he decides to leave. General Franco's staff car approaches the bridge he was supposed to demolish, the explosion taking place seconds after Allan waves down the car, making Allan appear a hero. Franco invites Allan to a dinner, where he presents his favorite pistol to him for saving his life.

Years after the Civil War, Allan sells the pistol to buy a work permit to travel to America. When informed that the world's biggest bomb is being assembled, Allan's passion for explosives is re-ignited and he helps Robert Oppenheimer in successfully developing the atomic bomb. For his work, Allan receives praise from U.S. Vice President Harry S. Truman for 'building a bomb that will stop all wars'. During a drunken dinner, Truman is informed by telephone that Franklin D. Roosevelt, then President of the United States, has died, and Truman is immediately sworn in as president.

Allan returns to Sweden, but on touching down he is met by representatives of the Swedish government, seeking to make use of his knowledge of the atomic bomb. However, they are totally unconvinced that Allan, who never attended a university, could have any vital role in its development of the bomb and they abandon any attempt to interrogate him further. A man named Popov later befriends Allan, gets him drunk and leads him to Moscow. During a drunken party with Joseph Stalin, Allan accidentally admits that he saved Franco's life, causing the infuriated Stalin to imprison Allan in a Siberian Gulag labor camp.

The story continues through other countries and wild adventures, with Allan "coincidentally" meeting new people, both famous and ordinary, and causing world changing events, in a way that has been compared with Forrest Gump. The two storylines of Allan's life in the past, and his adventures since he climbed out of the window, eventually merge. The police call off the search for Allan, not realizing he has anything to do with the loss of the suitcase and money. With the help of Popov's son Oleg, Allan and his friends settle down to a life of leisure in Bali.

== Cast ==
- Robert Gustafsson as Allan Karlsson
- Iwar Wiklander as Julius
- David Wiberg as Benny
- Mia Skäringer as Gunilla
- Jens Hultén as Gäddan
- Bianca Cruzeiro as Caracas
- Alan Ford as Pim
- Sven Lönn as Hinken
- David Shackleton as Herbert Einstein
- Georg Nikoloff as Popov
- Sibylle Bernardin as Amanda Einstein
- Koldo Losada as Francisco Franco
- Kerry Shale as Harry S. Truman
- Philip Rosch as Robert Oppenheimer
- Algirdas Paulavičius (actor) as Joseph Stalin
- Sigitas Rackys as Mikhail Gorbachev
- Keith Chanter as Ronald Reagan
- Dagny Carlsson as elderly woman

== Reception ==
The Hundred-Year-Old Man Who Climbed Out of the Window and Disappeared received a 68% approval rating on Rotten Tomatoes, based on 80 reviews, with an average rating of 6/10. The consensus reads: "Its efforts to earn laughs can be as ungainly as its title, but for viewers in tune with its absurdist humor, The 100-Year-Old Man Who Climbed Out the Window and Disappeared offers much to recommend." On Metacritic, the film has a score of 58 out of 100, based on 15 critics, indicating "mixed or average reviews".
