= Tintin Anderzon =

Swedish actress

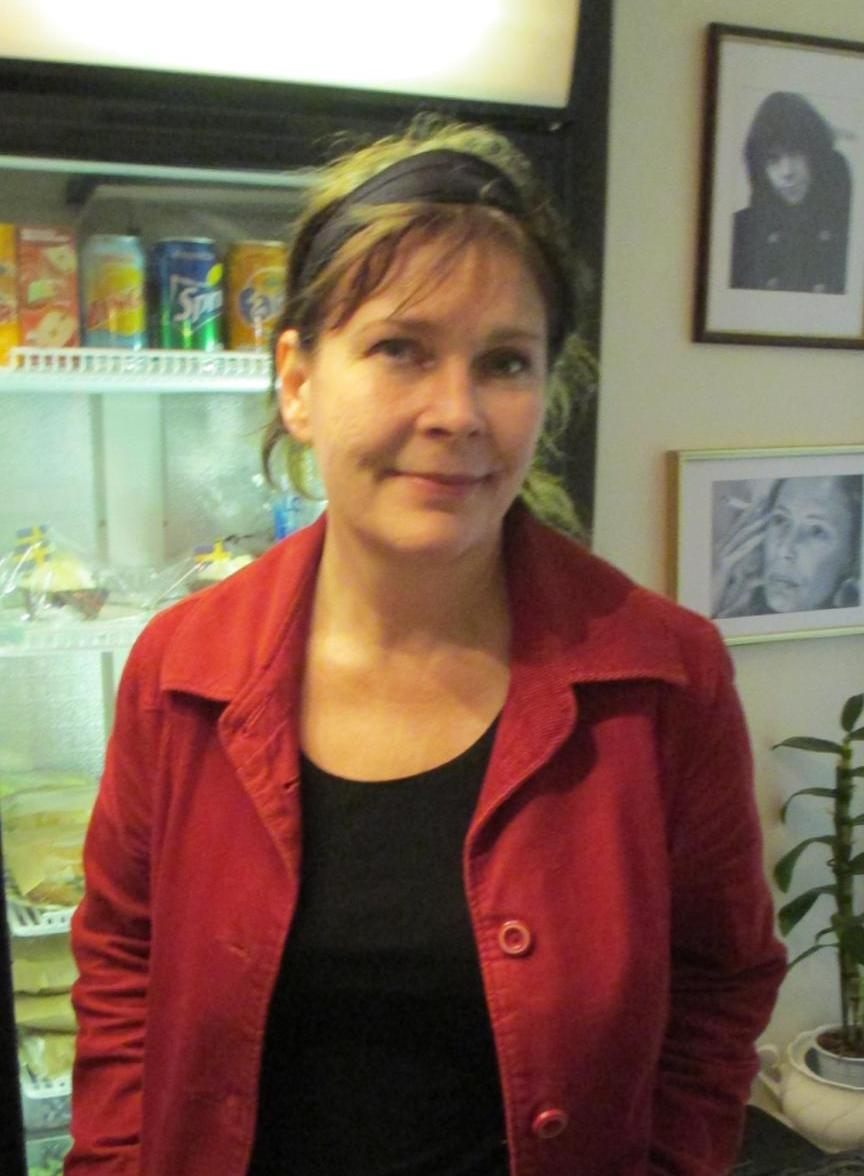
- Anderzon in 2015
- Born: Anna Catharina Tintin Anderzon; 29 April 1964 (age 62); Järfälla, Sweden
- Occupation: Actress
- Years active: 1974–present
- Parent: Kim Anderzon

Anna Catharina Tintin Anderzon (born 29 April 1964) is a Swedish actress and daughter of actress Kim Anderzon.

== Biography ==
Anderzon co-starred in the feature film Marianne (2011) and has also starred in many Swedish film and television roles.

== Filmography ==
- 2011 – Marianne
- 2010 – Sector 236 - Thor's Wrath
- 2004 – Håkan Bråkan & Josef
- 2003 – Håkan Bråkan
- 2000 – Före stormen
- 1999 – En häxa i familjen
- 1999 – Stjärnsystrar
- 1997 – Tic Tac
- 1997 – Adam & Eva
- 1995 – En på miljonen
