= Morgan Alling =

Swedish actor, screenwriter and director (born 1968)

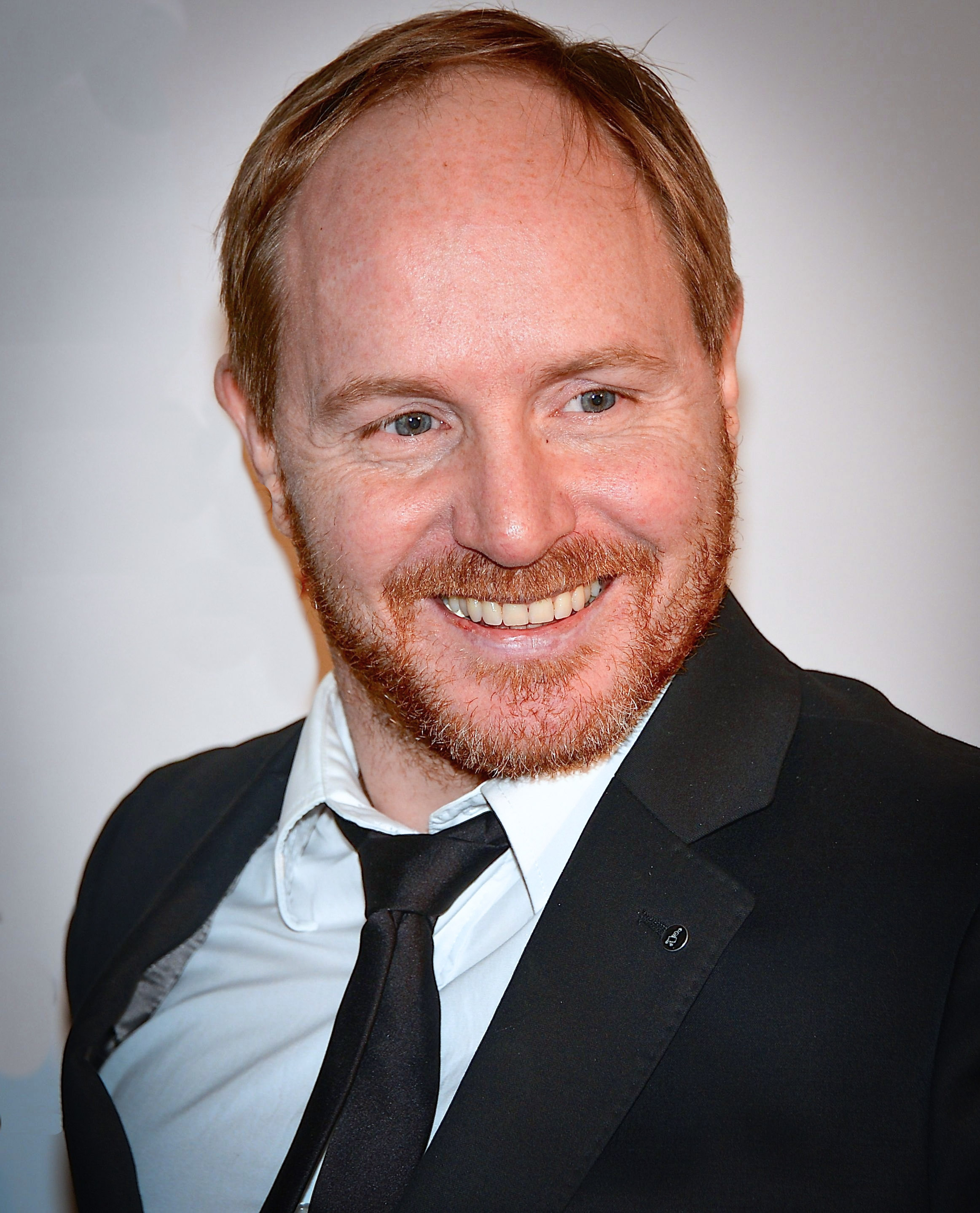
- Morgan Alling in 2013.
- Born: Sven Robert Morgan Persson; 8 June 1968 (age 58); Mölndal, Sweden
- Education: Malmö Theatre Academy
- Occupation: Actor
- Spouse: Anna-Maria Dahl
- Children: 4

Sven Robert Morgan Alling (born Persson; 8 June 1968) is a Swedish actor, screenwriter and film and theatre director.

Alling graduated from the Malmö Theatre Academy in 1990. He rose to fame in 1993 as co-host of children's television show Tippen. He participated in Stjärnorna på slottet in 2016.

== Filmography ==
- Sune i Grekland (2012)
- 2009 – Hjälp!
- 2008 – Oskyldigt dömd
- 2008 – Arn – The Kingdom at Road's End
- 2007 – Hjälp!
- Arn – The Knight Templar (2007)
- Göta Kanal 2 – Kanalkampen (2006)
- 2006 – LasseMajas detektivbyrå
- Lögnens pris (2006)
- 2006 – Kronprinsessan
- 2005 – Lasermannen
- 2005 – Bellman & Lovisa
- 2005 – Lite som du
- Tjenare kungen (2005)
- Kogänget (2004)
- 2004 – Höjdarna
- Ramona (2003)
- 2002 – Taurus
- Anderssons älskarinna (2001)
- Gossip (2000)
- En dag i taget. Medicinberoende (1999)
- Den vita lejoninnan (1996)
- Torntuppen (1996)
- Tippen (1994)

== Theatre ==
- 2011 - Två herrars tjänare (The Royal Dramatic Theatre, Stockholm)
- 2007 - Maskerade (The Royal Swedish Opera, Stockholm)
- 2007 - Sultanens hemlighet (The Royal Dramatic Theatre, Stockholm)
- 2005 - Köpmannen i Venedig (The Royal Dramatic Theatre, Stockholm)
- 2004 - A Clockwork Orange (The Royal Dramatic Theatre, Stockholm)
- 2003 - Farmor och vår herre (The Royal Dramatic Theatre, Stockholm)
- 2003 - En Magisk Jul (The Royal Dramatic Theatre, Stockholm)
- 2003 - Romeo and Juliet (The Royal Dramatic Theatre, Stockholm)
- 2002 - Hustruskolan (The Royal Dramatic Theatre, Stockholm)
- 2001 - Skattkammarön (The Royal Dramatic Theatre, Stockholm)
- 2000 - Scapin (The Royal Dramatic Theatre, Stockholm)
- 1998 - Erik XIV (Teater Halland)
- 1996 - Hamlet -om vi hinner 2.0 (Teater Halland)
- 1996 - Kärleksbarn (Östgötateatern, Norrköping)
- 1996 - Paradisets barn (Malmö City Theatre)
- 1995 - Commedia
- 1994 - Clowner - En improvisation
- 1991 - Oliver (Studioteatern, Malmö)
- 1990 - Nicholas Nickleby (Gothenburg City Theatre)

== Music ==
- 1997 - Lasses och Morgans sopresa
- 1996 - Lasse och Morgans jul
- 1994 - Gänget från Tippen
