= Anja Lundqvist =

Swedish actress (born 1971)

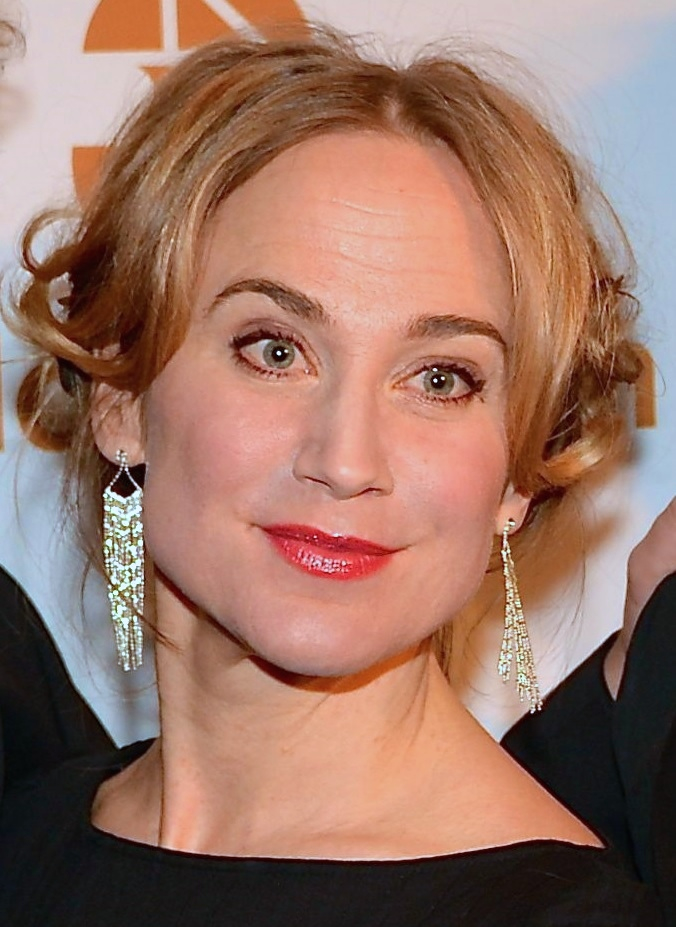
- Anja Lundqvist at Guldbaggegalan 2013
- Born: 7 June 1971 (age 54); Uppsala, Sweden
- Occupation: actress
- Years active: 2000-

Karin Anja Elisabet Lundqvist (born 7 June 1971) is a Swedish actress. She studied at the Swedish National Academy of Mime and Acting 1995–99.

== Selected filmography ==
- 2000 - Together (Tillsammans)
- 2002 - Stora teatern (TV)
- 2002–05 - Tusenbröder
- 2006 - Varannan vecka
- 2006 - Offside
- 2008 - Oskyldigt dömd (TV)
- 2010 - Våra vänners liv (TV)
- 2023 - Together 99 (Tillsammans 99)
