= Frida Hallgren =

Swedish actress (born 1974)

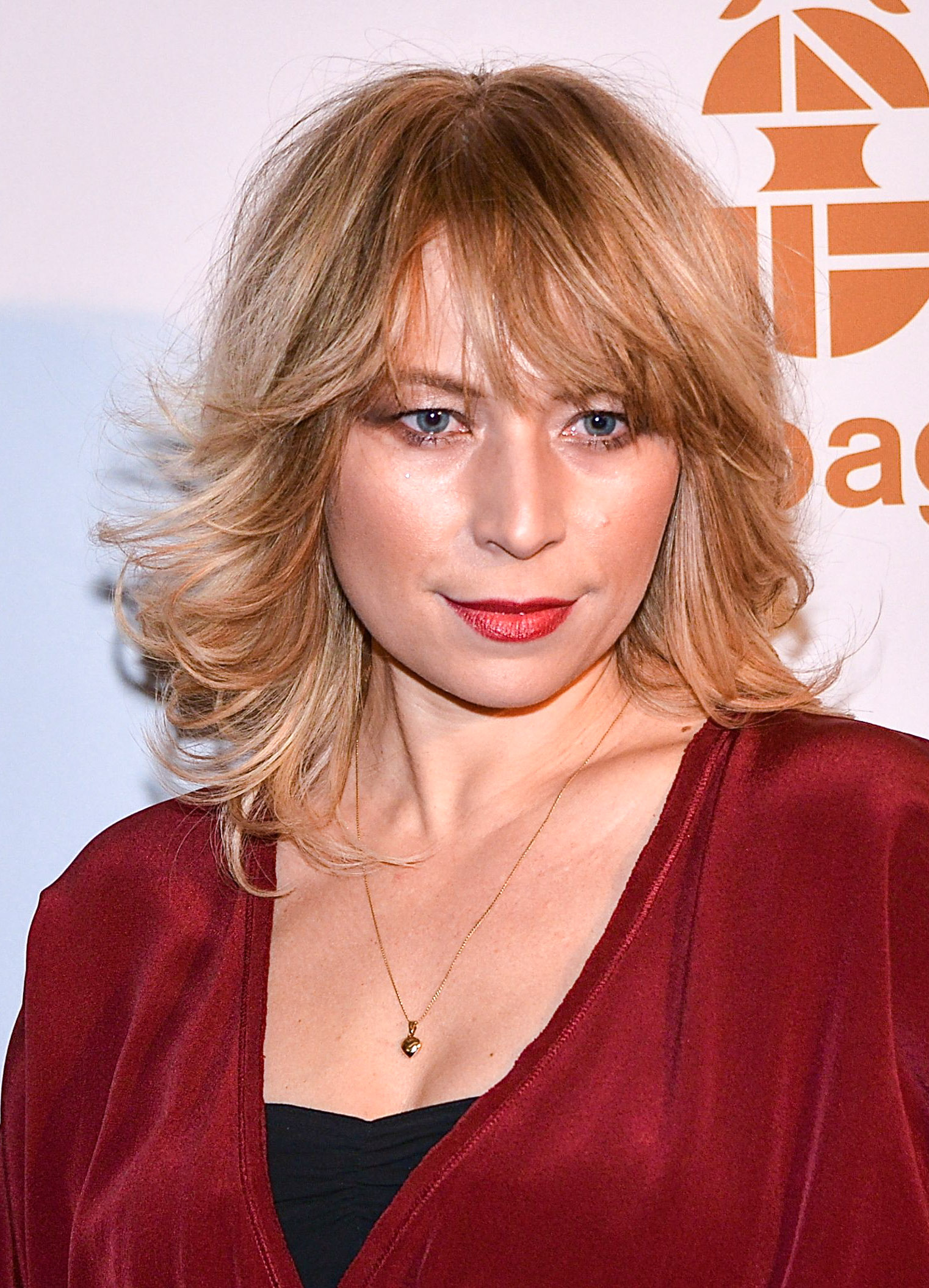
- Hallgren in 2013.
- Born: Frida Sophia Hallgren; 16 December 1974 (age 51); Stockholm, Sweden
- Occupation: Actress
- Years active: 1998–present

Frida Sophia Hallgren (born 16 December 1974) is a Swedish actress, internationally known from As It Is in Heaven.

She got her start in acting as a child in Hasse Funck's children's acting school and participated in Vår teater, a children's theater. After finishing her degree, Frida attended the theater university in Malmö. This training was connected to a practical course at the city theater of Gothenburg. Thereafter, Frida received several theater roles in Gothenburg, Stockholm, and Uppsala. She attained international fame with the leading role of Lena in Kay Pollak's Oscar nominated film As It Is in Heaven. In 2007, she was at the side of Walter Sittler and Inger Nilsson (Pippi Longstocking) in the Second German Television miniseries Der Kommissar und das Meer. She starred in the Swedish film Agent Hamilton: But Not If It Concerns Your Daughter in 2012. Since 2013, she acts in the series Fröken Frimans krig.
