= Ski Team Sweden =

National sport team

The Swedish Ski Team is the national skiing sport team of Sweden.

== Alpine skiing ==
=== Men ===
- André Myhrer – Slalom, Giant Slalom, combined
- Anton Lahdenperä – Slalom, Giant Slalom, combined
- Jens Byggmark - Slalom, Giant Slalom, combined
- Johan Brolenius - Slalom, Giant Slalom, combined
- Markus Larsson - Slalom, Giant Slalom, combined
- Mattias Hargin - Slalom, Giant Slalom, combined
- Matts Olsson - Slalom, Giant Slalom, combined, Super G, downhill
- Hans Olsson - Super G, downhill
- Niklas Rainer - Giant Slalom, Super G, downhill, combined
- Patrik Järbyn - Super G, downhill, combined
- Oscar Andersson - Giant Slalom, Super G

=== Women ===
- Anja Pärsson - Slalom, Giant Slalom, Super G, Downhill, combined
- Frida Hansdotter - Slalom, Giant Slalom, Super G, Downhill, combined
- Jessica Lindell-Vikarby - Super G, Downhill, combined
- Kajsa Kling - Slalom, Giant Slalom, Super G, Downhill combined
- Nike Bent - Super G, Downhill, combined
- Veronica Smedh - Slalom, Giant Slalom, combined
- Therese Borssén - Slalom, Giant Slalom, combined
- Maria Pietilä Holmner - Slalom, Giant Slalom, combined
- Magdalena Fjällström

== Cross-country skiing ==
=== Sprint ===
==== Men ====
- Björn Lind
- Emil Jönsson
- Thobias Fredriksson
- Peter Larsson
- Robin Bryntesson
- Marcus Hellner
- Fredrik Byström

==== Women ====
- Charlotte Kalla
- Lina Andersson
- Anna Olsson
- Ida Ingemarsdotter
- Britta Norgren

=== Classic and skate skiing, 5 km or longer ===
==== Men ====
- Johan Olsson
- Marcus Hellner
- Anders Södergren
- Mattias Fredriksson
- Daniel Richardsson
- Jesper Modin
- Mats Larsson
- Tilo Soderhjelm

==== Women ====
- Charlotte Kalla
- Anna Haag
- Anna Olsson
- Anna Simberg
- Britta Norgren
- Maria Rydqvist
- Sara Lindborg
- Ida Ingemarsdotter

== Ski jumping ==
=== Men ===
- Johan Erikson
- Andreas Aren
- Carl Nordin
- Isak Grimholm
- Fredrik Baalkaasen
- Niklas Eriksson
