= Måns Herngren =

Swedish actor and noted director (born 1965)

- Born: 20 April 1965 (age 60); Stockholm, Sweden
- Occupation(s): Actor, film director
- Years active: 1983—present
- Spouse(s): Anna Herdenstam (m. 1988) Lena Philipsson (m. 1993–2002) Kajsa Bergqvist (m. 2007–2011) Katalin Bachry (m. 2014)
- Children: 3
- Relatives: Felix Herngren (brother)

Måns Herngren (born 20 April 1965) is a Swedish actor and noted director. Almost all of his films are done together with his friend Hannes Holm. He is the older brother to actor and comedian Felix Herngren.

Herngren and Holm's Adam & Eva was the highest-grossing film in Sweden in 1997, grossing $5.4 million. Afterwards, he and Hannes formed their own production company AS Fladen. Det blir aldrig som man tänkt sig was their third hit and also topped the Swedish box office.

Måns Herngren was married to Lena Philipsson from 1993 to 2002. He was married to former high jumper Kajsa Bergqvist, but their divorce was announced early 2011.

== Selected filmography ==
- 1990: S*M*A*S*H (Director)
- 1995: One in a Million (En på miljonen) (Director)
- 1997: Adam & Eva (Director)
- 1998: Snow (Director)
- 2000: Det blir aldrig som man tänkt sig (Things Never End Up The Way You've Planned or Shit Happens) (Director)
- 2001: En fot i graven (TV mini-series director)
- 2002: Klassfesten (The Class Reunion) (Director)
- 2006: Varannan vecka (Every Other Week) (Actor and director)
- 2008: Allt flyter (The Swimsuit Issue) (Director)
- 2016: The 101-Year-Old Man Who Skipped Out on the Bill and Disappeared (Co-director)
