= Felix Herngren =

Swedish film director, actor, writer, and comedian (born 1967)

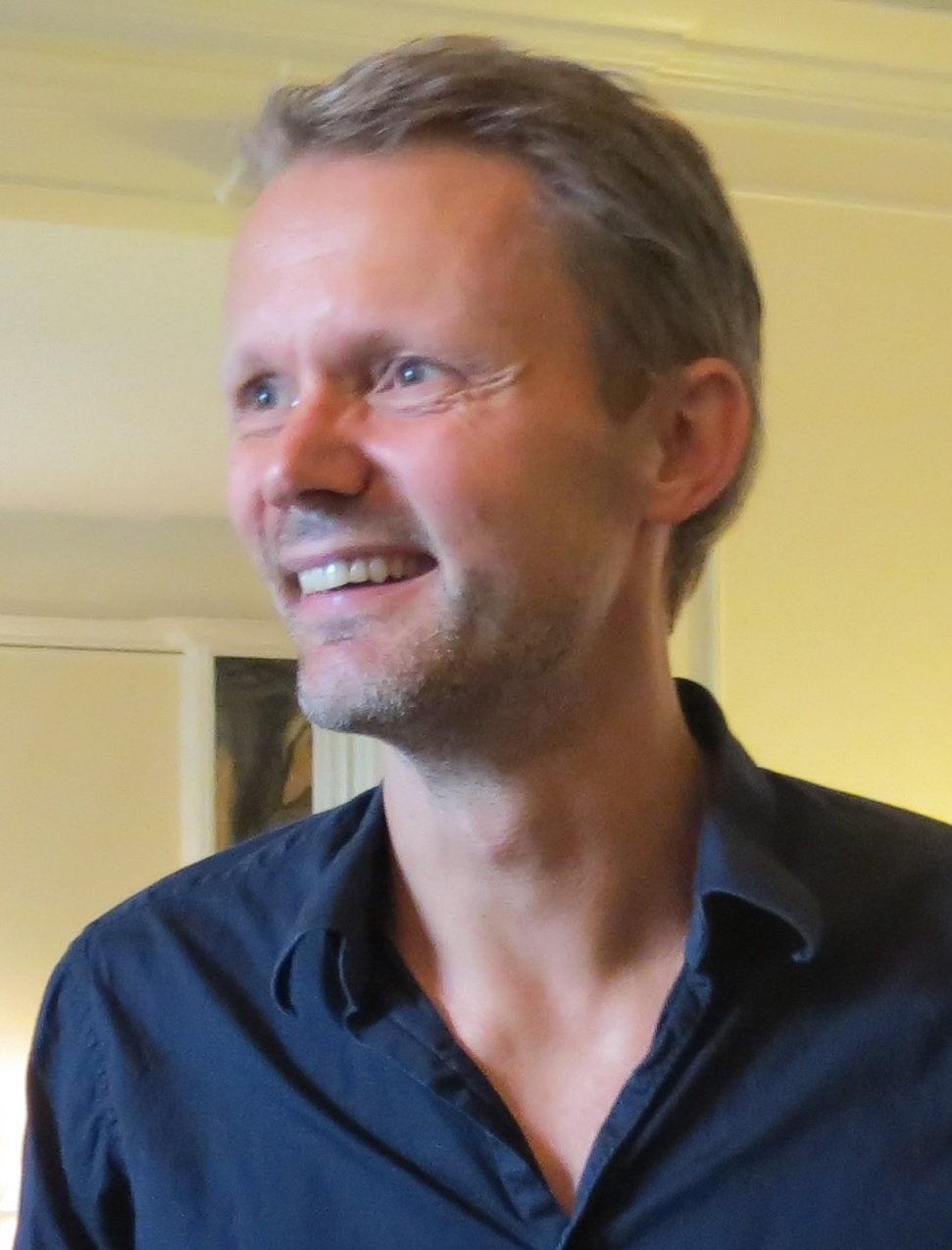
- Felix Herngren at the 2012 Polar Music Prize reception
- Born: Felix Tobias Herngren; 4 February 1967 (age 59); Stockholm, Sweden
- Occupations: Director, actor, writer, comedian
- Spouses: Jenny Myrberg (m. 1990–2003) Clara Byström (m. 2005)
- Children: 6
- Relatives: Måns Herngren (brother); Moa Herngren (sister)

Felix Tobias Herngren (born 4 February 1967) is a Swedish director, actor, writer, and comedian. He is known for creating and acting in the Swedish television drama-comedy series Solsidan. He is the younger brother of director and actor Måns Herngren.

Herngren also directed and wrote the film The Hundred-Year-Old Man Who Climbed Out the Window and Disappeared which has been screened in more than 40 countries and grossing more than 50 million US dollars worldwide. He also appeared as a character in the TV programme Sen kväll med Luuk.

Since 2021, he has been participating in Masked Singer Sverige.

== Selected filmography ==
- 1990: S*M*A*S*H
- 1997: Adam & Eva
- 1999: Vuxna människor (Grown Up People)
- 2000: Naken (Naked)
- 2004: Terkel in Trouble (Swedish voice for all the characters)
- 2006: Varannan vecka (Every Other Week)
- 2007: Hjälp! (Help!, TV-series)
- 2010: Solsidan
- 2013: The Hundred-Year-Old Man Who Climbed Out the Window and Disappeared
- 2016: The 101-Year-Old Man Who Skipped Out on the Bill and Disappeared
- 2017: Solsidan (film)
- 2024: Jana: Marked for Life (TV series)
