= 40th Guldbagge Awards =

Swedish awards ceremony

- Date: 24 January 2005
- Site: Chinateatern, Stockholm
- Hosted by: Björn Kjellman

Highlights
- Best Picture: Dalecarlians
- Most awards: Four Shades of Brown (4)
- Most nominations: Four Shades of Brown & As It Is in Heaven (8)

Television coverage
- Network: SVT

The 40th Guldbagge Awards ceremony, presented by the Swedish Film Institute, honored the best Swedish films of 2004, and took place on 24 January 2005. Dalecarlians directed by Maria Blom was presented with the award for Best Film.

== Winner and nominees ==
=== Awards ===
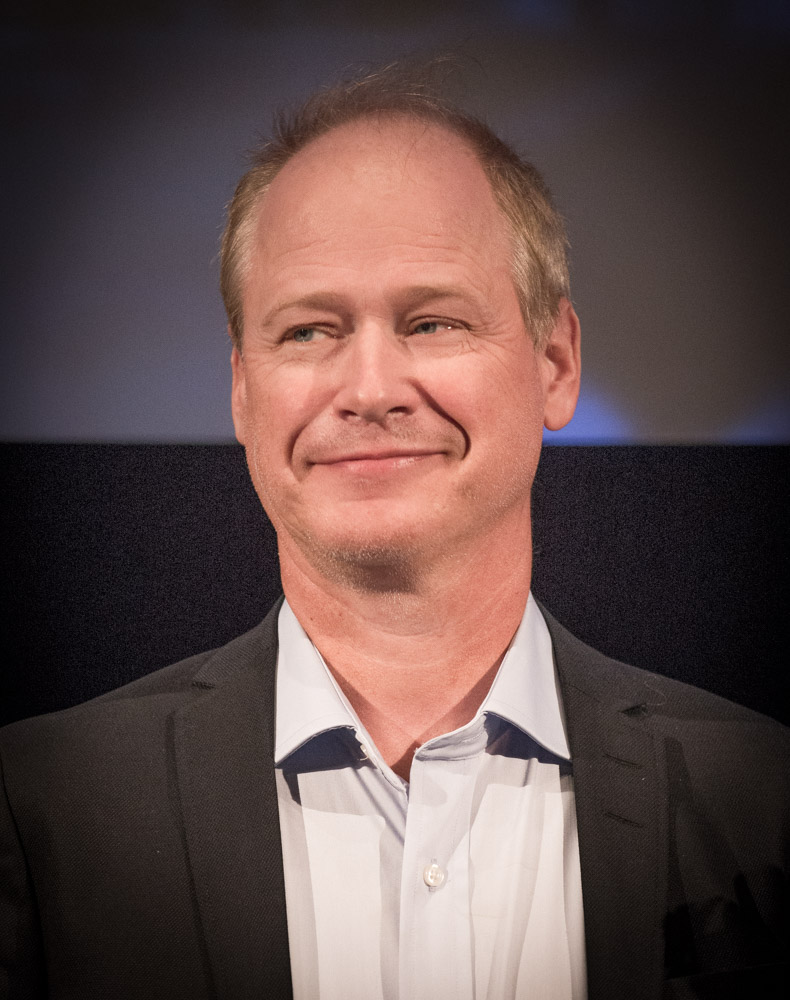
Robert Gustafsson, Best Actor winner

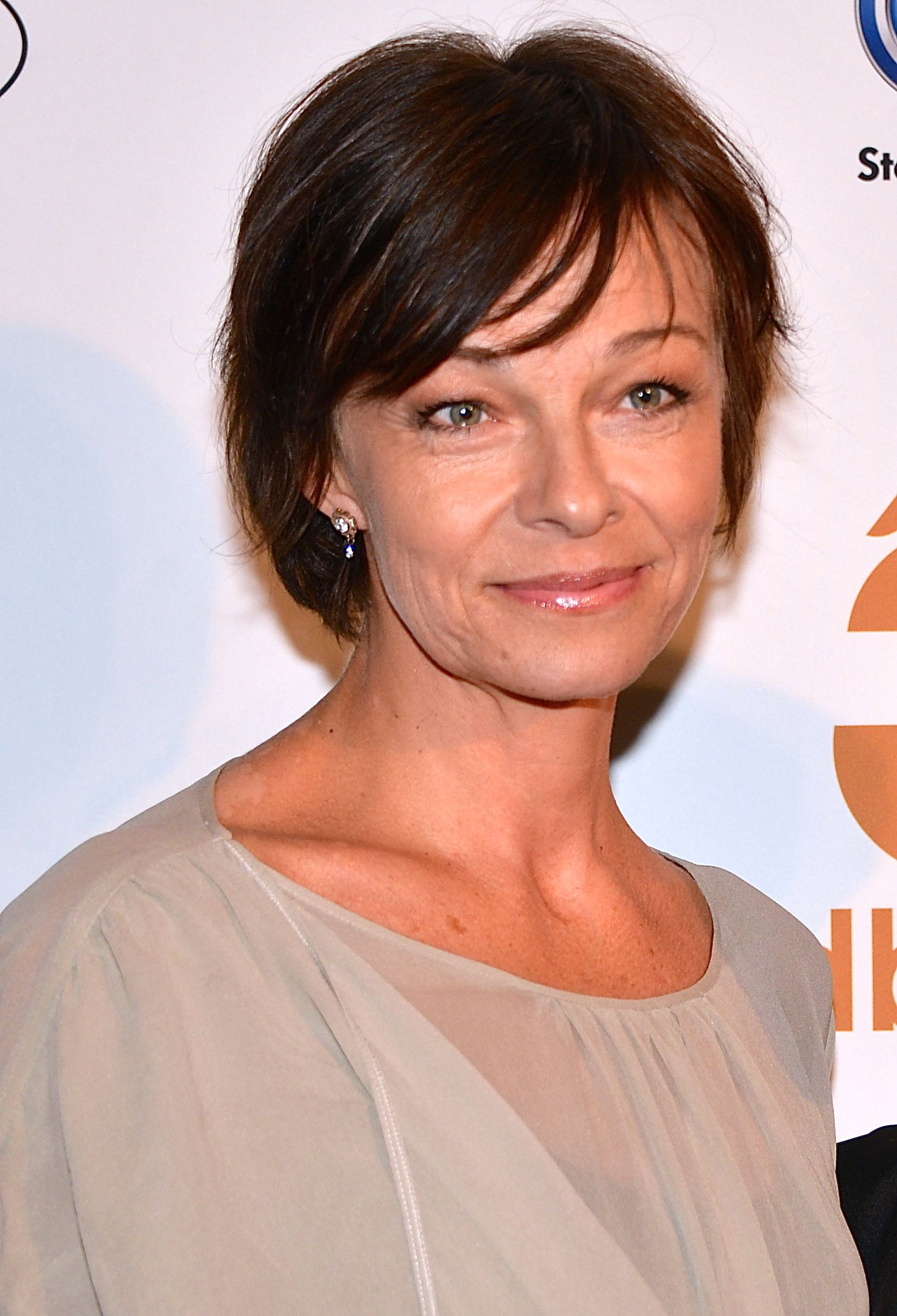
Kajsa Ernst, Best Supporting Actress winner

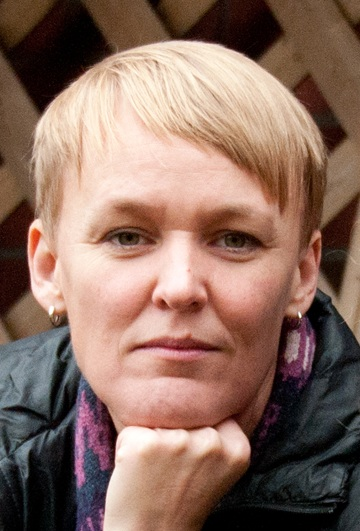
Maria Blom, Best Screenplay winner

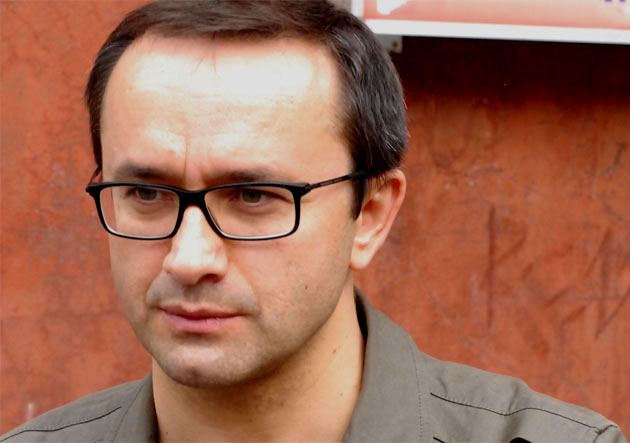
Andrey Zvyagintsev, Best Foreign Film winner

Best Film: Dalecarlians – Lars Jönsson; Four Shades of Brown – Caisa Westling; As It Is in Heaven – Anders Birkeland and Göran Lindström	Best Director: Tomas Alfredson – Four Shades of Brown; Maria Blom – Dalecarlians; Kay Pollak – As It Is in Heaven
Best Actress in a leading role: Maria Kulle – Four Shades of Brown; Sofia Helin – Dalecarlians; Frida Hallgren – As It Is in Heaven	Best Actor in a leading role: Robert Gustafsson – Four Shades of Brown; Johan Rheborg – Four Shades of Brown; Michael Nyqvist – As It Is in Heaven
Best Supporting Actress: Kajsa Ernst – Dalecarlians; Ann Petrén – Dalecarlians; Ingela Olsson – As It Is in Heaven	Best Supporting Actor: Ulf Brunnberg – Four Shades of Brown; Joakim Lindblad – Dalecarlians; Lennart Jähkel – As It Is in Heaven
Best Screenplay: Maria Blom – Dalecarlians; Tomas Alfredson, Robert Gustafsson, Jonas Inde, Andres Lokko, Martin Luuk, Johan Rheborg and Henrik Schyffert – Four Shades of Brown; Kay Pollak, Carin Pollak and Margaretha Pollak – As It Is in Heaven	Best Cinematography: Jens Fischer – The Queen of Sheba's Pearls; Leif Benjour – Four Shades of Brown; Harald Gunnar Paalgard – As It Is in Heaven
Best Documentary Feature: Armwrestler from Solitude – Lisa Munthe and Helen Ahlsson; The Baker – Kristina Meiton; Gå loss – Magnus Gertten och Erik Bäfving	Best Shortfilm: Glenn, the Great Runner – Anna Erlandsson; Fragile – Jens Jonsson; Terrible Boy – Johan Jonason
Best Achievement: Lasse Liljeholm and Eddie Axberg, for the sound in The Queen of Sheba's Pearls; Sofia Lindgren, for the editing in The Ketchup Effect	Best Foreign Film: (Russia) The Return – Andrey Zvyagintsev; (United States) 21 Grams – Alejandro González Iñárritu; (United States) Lost in Translation – Sofia Coppola
Honorary Award: Sickan Carlsson, actress and singer	The Ingmar Bergman Award: Mikael Persbrandt

== See also ==
- 77th Academy Awards
- 62nd Golden Globe Awards
- 58th British Academy Film Awards
- 11th Screen Actors Guild Awards
- 10th Critics' Choice Awards
- 25th Golden Raspberry Awards
