= Tsatsiki – vänner för alltid =

2001 film by Eddie Thomas Petersen

- Directed by: Eddie Thomas Petersen
- Written by: Eddie Thomas Petersen
- Produced by: Anne Ingvar
- Music by: Anders Melander
- Distributed by: Felicia Film AB; Nordisk Film A/S
- Release date: 25 December 2001 (Sweden)
- Running time: 89 minutes
- Country: Sweden
- Language: Swedish

Tsatsiki – vänner för alltid ("Tsatsiki – Friends Forever") is an internationally co-produced drama film directed by Eddie Thomas Petersen, which was released to cinemas in Sweden on 25 December 2001, based on the books about Tsatsiki written by Moni Nilsson-Brännström.

== Plot ==
Tsatsiki's girlfriend Maria suddenly brakes their relationship; she "doesn't believe something about love", and hates Tsatsiki's flowers because "krukväxter ger man bara till gamlingar" ("houseplants you should only give to old people").

A few days later his best friend Per Hammar also leaves Tsatsiki, because Tsatsiki made him unlucky with saying to Maria that "han kissar i sängen" ("bedwetting").

Later Tsatsiki, "Morsan" and Göran will travel to Greece where Tsatsiki's father, grandfather and cousin Elena live. A few days before the journey he goes to Maria who lost her pen box at school, and tells her that Göran and Niclas said that the flowers were a "love gesture", but she doesn't believe it and says that he can "go to Greece and after that tell her what love is if he can learn about love there". When they're going it comes problems; Niclas says that he, "Morsan" and their rock group will go for a concert tour to Japan, but soon Tsatsiki allows "Morsan" to go and instead he lets Grandpa ("Morfar") go with him to Greece, where Tsatsiki's paternal grandfather who is terminally ill ("Farfar") and Elena tells him what love is. Before his paternal grandfather dies he shows Tsatsiki and grandfather the place where he first met Tsatsiki's grandmother who was a member of the greek resistance like him during World War II they fought for the freedom of Greece against the Germans.

When he comes back home, he goes to Per and apologizes and they go, together with Göran, to Strömmen where it's a fishing competition which Tsatsiki and Per planned before Tsatsiki made him unlucky. Later he goes to Maria and tells her that he learnt about love in Greece and she loves him again. Now he understands that the most alone person on the whole Earth is he/she who doesn't have any friend.

=== Citation ===
- (Tsatsiki) Morfar, vet du vad jag tycker är viktigast? – Att ha en kompis ("Grandpa, do you know what I think is most important? – To have a friend").

== About the film ==
Every actor from the earlier film Tsatsiki, morsan och polisen appeared in this new Tsatsiki-film except Alexandra Rapaport (changed to Sara Sommerfeld), Jacob Ericksson (changed to Eric Ericson) and Jonas Karlsson (changed to Joakim Nätterqvist). There are also new characters: Tsatsiki's grandfather (Yanis' father) (Georgios Moulianitakis), Tsatsiki's grandfather ("Morsan"'s father) (Krister Henriksson) and Tsatsiki's cousin Elena (Simona Ericsson).

In this film Tsatsiki and "Morsan" have left the villa area and live in an apartment in the city and Tsatsiki and his class have changed school.

== Cast ==
- Samuel Haus as Tsatsiki
- Sara Sommerfeld as Morsan
- Krister Henriksson as Tsatsiki's grandfather (Morsan's father)
- Eric Ericson as Göran
- Joakim Nätterqvist as Niclas (bassist)
- Minken Fosheim as Tsatsiki's teacher
- Sam Kessel as Per Hammar
- Isa Engström as Maria
- Maria Hazell as Sara
- Kasper Lindström as Wille
- Elin Åkesson as Elin
- Amanda Rasmusson as Mona
- Torbjörn Lindström as Maria's father
- Marie Delleskog as Maria's mother
- George Nakas as Yanis, Tsatsiki's father
- Georgios Moulianitakis as Tsatsiki's grandfather (Yanis' father)
- Thomas Hedengran as Lifeguard
- Ida Holmberg as Retzina, Tsatsiki's sister (she is born in the end on the film)
