= Memfis Film =

Swedish film production company

Memfis Film AB also known as Memfis Filmproduktion AB and AB Memfis Film & Television, is a Swedish film production company. Founded by Lars Jönsson in 1989, Memfis is one of few comparatively new production units that has shown staying power and played a continuous role in the Swedish film community. Memfis have produced film by Lukas Moodysson, Josef Fares, and Lars von Trier among others.

== Selected productions ==
Work	Year	Director	Notes
House of Angels	1992	Colin Nutley	Feature
Harry & Sonja	1996	Björn Runge	Feature
Love Fools	1998	Leif Magnusson (director)	Feature
Fucking Åmål	1998	Lukas Moodysson	Feature
Jalla! Jalla!	2000	Josef Fares	Feature
A Summer Tale	2000	Ulf Malmros	Feature
Together	2000	Lukas Moodysson	Feature
Prop og Berta	2001	Per Fly	Feature
Lilja 4-ever	2002	Lukas Moodysson	Feature
Kopps	2003	Josef Fares	Feature
Masjävlar	2004	Maria Blom	Feature
A Hole in My Heart	2004	Lukas Moodysson	Feature
Zozo	2005	Josef Fares	Feature
Mammoth	2009	Lukas Moodysson	Feature
Melancholia	2011	Lars von Trier	Feature
Vi är bäst!	2013	Lukas Moodysson	Feature
Together 99 (Tillsammans 99)	2023	Lukas Moodysson	Feature
