= Ares (film) =

- Theatrical release poster
- Arès
- Directed by: Jean-Patrick Benes
- Written by: Jean-Patrick Benes; Allan Mauduit; Benjamin Dupas
- Produced by: Sidonie Dumas; Matthieu Tarot
- Starring: Ola Rapace; Micha Lescot; Thierry Hancisse; Hélène Fillières; Ruth Vega Fernandez; Eva Lallier
- Cinematography: Jerome Almeras
- Edited by: Vincent Tabaillon
- Music by: Alex Cortes
- Production companies: Albertine Productions; Gaumont; Cinefrance
- Distributed by: Gaumont
- Release dates: 10 October 2016 (Sitges Film Festival); 11 November 2016 (France)
- Running time: 80 minutes
- Country: France
- Language: French
- Budget: €4 million

Ares (French: Arès) is a 2016 French dystopian science fiction film directed by Jean-Patrick Benes. Ola Rapace stars as a boxer who is forced into testing a dangerous new performance-enhancing drug for one of the corporations that now controls France. It premiered at the Paris Comic-con on October 21 and was released in France on 11 November 2016.

== Plot ==
In the 2020s, France's economy collapses, and corporations buy its debt. More than 15% of the population is unemployed and living in squalid homeless encampments-the largest being under the Eiffel Tower. Although still nominally a republic, the corporations take control of the government and pass sweeping reforms, deregulating many industries. Among these changes, doping and human experimentation are legalized. As homelessness and unemployment rise, violent new sports are introduced. Athletes become sponsored by pharmaceutical companies, who test their new drugs on them. After a promising start, boxer Reda, who fights under the pseudonym Ares, is injured and loses his corporate sponsor. Besides performing in brutal cage matches as a low-ranked fighter, he takes jobs for a female corporate agent Altman, with whom he has a relationship. The corporate-run police department hire unemployed temporary workers during periods of civil unrest, with Reda being one of riot security guards on the front lines. During a riot, he notices his niece(an advocate of anti-corporatism) getting placed in a police van and he manages to get her released.

When his sister Carla is framed for possession of an illegal pistol, Altman tells Reda that Carla will be charged as a terrorist. The only way to save her from a prison sentence is to bribe the officials, which will take €100,000. To raise the money, Reda is forced to submit to human experimentation for HSX, a drug that has killed every other test subject. Although corporate executive Anna assures him his biochemistry will likely allow him to survive the drug, she warns that he will black out five minutes after taking it. Reda leaves Carla's children with his neighbor, a cross-dressing prostitute named Myosotis who believes Reda to be a fascist. Despite their antagonistic relationship, Myosotis agrees to help him for the sake of the children. Unable to bet on himself, Reda convinces Myosotis to bet Reda's meager life savings on the fight.

Needing a dramatic demonstration to spur sales, the chief executive officer arranges for Reda to fight a highly ranked fighter who has had his nervous system tweaked so that he no longer feels pain. The fight is widely believed to be impossible for Reda to win, and even his coach declines to bet on Reda. HSX performs well, and Reda wins against 12:1 odds. The drug becomes a sensation, and Reda makes enough money to free Carla, using Myosotis as a middleman. Before he can, she dies in prison while attempting to save another inmate. Altman offers to return the money, but Reda asks her to use it to find out who framed his sister. At the same time, Anouk's boyfriend Boris, a hacker who supports the resistance, provides evidence that implicates Reda's coach.

Reda once again leaves the children with Myosotis. During his next fight, Reda goes down in 17 seconds, and his earlier win is written off as a fluke. Sales of HSX plummet, and Reda's coach is financially ruined. When Reda meets with him, Reda reveals that he did not take the drug and intentionally threw the fight. Instead, he saved the drug to administer it to his coach, who quickly dies once he is injected. Anna finds Reda and tells him that she has ordered Altman to kidnap Carla's children. Anna says that although Altman truly does care for him, Altman cares more for money. Reda reluctantly agrees to a demonstration in front of the corporate board. At Reda's house, Altman orders Anouk to call Myosotis. Anouk tells Myosotis that Reda wishes to thank him, a deeply uncharacteristic action. Suspicious, Myosotis recruits Boris' hacking talents for help.

Boris and Myosotis rescue the children and kill Altman. Once they signal Reda that they are safe, Reda takes HSX and throws the chief executive officer out of a window. Anna's bodyguards, two genetically engineered clones of the most powerful arena fighters, initially gain an advantage on Reda. However, Anna forbids them from killing him, as they need him for more drug trials. Handicapped by having to take Reda alive, both die. With the five minute time limit running out, Reda considers killing Anna but instead assists Boris in remotely hacking into the corporation's mainframe. There, Boris uncovers proof that over 30,000+ people died in HSX's drug trials. Knowing his nieces will never be safe from the corporation while he is alive as "patient zero", Reda commits suicide despite Anna's protests which destroys the future of the drug HSX. Boris hijacks the advertising, media display system and shows the extent of HSX's failed drug trials and Reda's death. The death of Reda starts a movement against the corporate leadership of France and massive riots ensue.

== Themes ==
Ares uses the current events of government bond indebtedness and corporate/public governance as a historical backdrop. Also seen are references to the Gilet Jaune movement including scenes that replicate Yellow Vest Riots of Paris. France unemployement levels, Le Chomage, are one of the grievances of the movement. References to Big Pharma and the direct marketing of drugs to the populace using corporate media also play heavily in the film.

== Cast ==
- Ola Rapace as Reda
- Micha Lescot as Myosotis
- Thierry Hancisse as Reda's coach
- Hélène Fillières as Altman
- Ruth Vega Fernandez as Anna
- Eva Lallier as Anouk
- Elina Soloman as Mae
- Yvon Martin as Tyro
- Pierre Perrier as Boris
- Émilie Gavois-Kahn as Carla
- Louis-Do de Lencquesaing as PDG Donevia
- Alexis Michalik as National Defense Framework

== Release ==
Ares premiered at the Paris Comic-con on 21 October 2016. It was released in France on 11 November 2016.

== Reception ==
On French review aggregator website AlloCiné, Ares has an average rating of 3.1/5 stars based on 14 reviews from professional critics. Jordan Mintzer of The Hollywood Reporter wrote, "It's a film that in its best moments revisits the smoggy neo-urban textures of Blade Runner but otherwise feels like a questionable cross between Bloodsport and Babylon A.D."
