= Rapace =

Rapace is French surname. Notable people with the surname include:

- Noomi Rapace, née Norén (born 1979), Swedish actress
- Ola Rapace (born Pär Ola Norell, 1971), Swedish actor

== See also ==
- Rapaces de Gap, an ice hockey team based in Gap, France.
