= Lisa Lindgren (Swedish actress) =

Swedish actress (born 1968)

Elisabet "Lisa" Lindgren (born 1968 in Råsunda, Solna, Stockholm County) is a Swedish actress.

== Filmography ==
- Together (Tillsammans) - 2000
- Hans och hennes - 2001
- Klassfesten - 2002
- Skenäktenskap - 2002
- Tusenbröder - 2002, TV series
- Lejontämjaren - 2003
- Hjärtslag - 2004
- Populärmusik från Vittula - 2004
- Made in Yugoslavia - 2005
- Percy, Buffalo Bill & jag - 2005
- Together 99 (Tillsammans 99) - 2023
