= Hallin (surname) =

Hallin is a surname, commonly used in Sweden. Notable people with the surname include:

- Annika Hallin (born 1968), Swedish actress
- Bertil Hallin (born 1931), Swedish musician
- Håkan Hallin (born 1968), Swedish TV personality
- Lena Hallin (born 1961), retired Swedish Air Force officer
- Linda Hallin (born 1996), Swedish footballer
- Margareta Hallin (1931–2020), Swedish opera singer
- Mats Hallin (born 1958), Swedish ice hockey player
- Mira Hallin (born 2006), Swedish ice hockey player
- Per Hallin (born 1980), Swedish ice hockey player
- Ronny Hallin (1938–2026), American television producer and actress

== See also ==
- Hallin (disambiguation)
