= Tsatsiki, morsan och polisen =

- Directed by: Ella Lemhagen
- Screenplay by: Ulf Stark
- Produced by: Anne Ingvar
- Starring: Samuel House; Alexandra Rapaport; Jacob Ericksson; Jonas Karlsson
- Cinematography: Anders Bohman
- Distributed by: Columbia TriStar Films AB
- Release date: 1 October 1999 (Sweden)
- Country: Sweden
- Language: Swedish

Tsatsiki, morsan och polisen is a Swedish film directed by Ella Lemhagen which was released to cinemas in Sweden on 1 October 1999, based on the books about Tsatsiki written by Moni Nilsson-Brännström. It won the 1999 Guldbagge Award for Best Film and the 2000 Poznan Silver Goats award for Best Foreign Feature Movie at 18th Ale Kino! International Young Audience Film Festival.

The film was followed by the film Tsatsiki – vänner för alltid.

== Cast ==
- Samuel Haus as Tsatsiki
- Alexandra Rapaport as Tsatsiki's mother
- Jacob Ericksson as Göran
- Jonas Karlsson as Niklas
- George Nakas as Tsatsiki's father
- Sam Kessel as Per Hammar
- Isa Engström as Maria Grynwall
- Minken Fosheim as teacher
- Henric Holmberg as headmaster
- Marcus Hasselborg as Mårten
- Maria Hazell as Sara
- Kasper Lindström as Wille
- Maria Bonnevie as Elin
- Helge Jordal as Mårten's father
- Christina Stenius as Woman in clothes shop
- Lena B. Eriksson as Maria Grynwall's mother
