= Together 99 =

- Promotional release poster
- Swedish: Tillsammans 99
- Directed by: Lukas Moodysson
- Written by: Lukas Moodysson
- Produced by: Lars Jönsson; Anna Carlsten
- Starring: Gustaf Hammarsten; Shanti Roney
- Cinematography: Ellinor Hallin
- Production companies: Memfis Film; Film i Väst; Svenska Filminstitutet; Zentropa Entertainments
- Distributed by: REinvent Studios
- Release date: 7 September 2023 (TIFF)
- Running time: 115 minutes
- Countries: Sweden; Denmark
- Language: Swedish

Together 99 (Swedish: Tillsammans 99) is a 2023 comedy-drama film written and directed by Lukas Moodysson. A sequel to his 2000 film Together (Tillsammans), the film revisits the commune of Together in 1999 when Göran (Gustaf Hammarsten) and Klasse (Shanti Roney), as the only remaining residents of the community, decide to organize a reunion of their old friends.

The film entered production in 2022. Most of the original actors returned, with the exception of the children, Michael Nyqvist who died in 2017, and Ola Rapace, whose role of Lasse was recast with actor Jonas Karlsson.

It premiered in the Special Presentations program at the 2023 Toronto International Film Festival.

== Cast ==
- Gustaf Hammarsten as Göran
- Shanti Roney as Klasse
- Lisa Lindgren as Elisabeth
- Henrik Lundström as Fredrik
- Jonas Karlsson as Lasse
- Jessica Liedberg as Anna
- David Dencik as Peter
- Olle Sarri as Erik Andersson
- Anja Lundqvist as Lena
- Sten Ljunggren as Birger
- Cecilia Frode as Signe
- Lars Frode as Sigvard
- Julia Heveus as Mirjam
- Clara Christiansson Drake as Kompis
- Seb Carlsson as Kim

== Reception ==
=== Critical response ===
Together 99 has an approval rating of 71% on review aggregator website Rotten Tomatoes, based on 7 reviews, and an average rating of 7/10. Owen Gleiberman of Variety panned the film, writing that "What’s strange about “Together 99” is that it looks like a Lukas Moodysson film (natural light), it moves like a Lukas Moodysson film (the documentary-like flow), but it’s blanketed with a sodden forlorn Swedish bourgeois cynicism that makes you think Moodysson needs to get out more. In the ’70s, there was an ongoing debate about the Robert Altman of movies like “Nashville”: Did he love his characters, or was he looking down his nose at them? As an Altman believer, I never saw the condescension that some did, but I now see it in Lukas Moodysson. It’s not that he dislikes his characters; it’s that he no longer loves them enough to endow them with an inner glow. He has made a movie in the form of an endless cocktail party where no one, for a moment, looks truly happy or free, so the audience can’t even get a contact high."

Tim Grierson of Screen Daily was more positive, writing that "so many sequels stumble in trying to recapture the precise magic of the original, so it is a testament to Moodysson’s imagination and generosity that he convincingly crafts a follow-up which considers how these individuals would have changed over the span of nearly a quarter-century. The idealism of the 1970s has given way to the pre-millennium tension of the late 1990s, and the writer-director reconvenes his cast to measure the characters’ mental distance from their shared past. Some people are thriving, while others are struggling. Together 99 doesn’t place any judgments on its protagonists, nor is it snide in charting which of the characters have moved the furthest from the commune’s socialist ethos. Instead, Moodysson (as well as the housemates) have compassion for the ways that people evolve over time, shedding parts of themselves in the process."

For IndieWire, Vikram Murthi wrote that "it’s unclear if “Together 99” works as a standalone feature without the context of Moodysson’s original feature; in fact, it’s very easy to imagine a viewer feeling completely unmoored by the sight of aging radicals working through old hang-ups and contemporary crises. But anyone with enduring affection for “Together” will be mildly delighted by the myriad throwaway callbacks in “Together 99,” such as Göran’s delightfully uncompetitive spirit during pickup games or the lasting emphasis on homemade oatmeal as a staple. Like any belated sequel, part of the joy of “Together 99” derives from watching older actors inhabit their once-younger characters and capture how age both has and hasn’t changed their core selves."
