= Florent Dorin =

French actor and musician

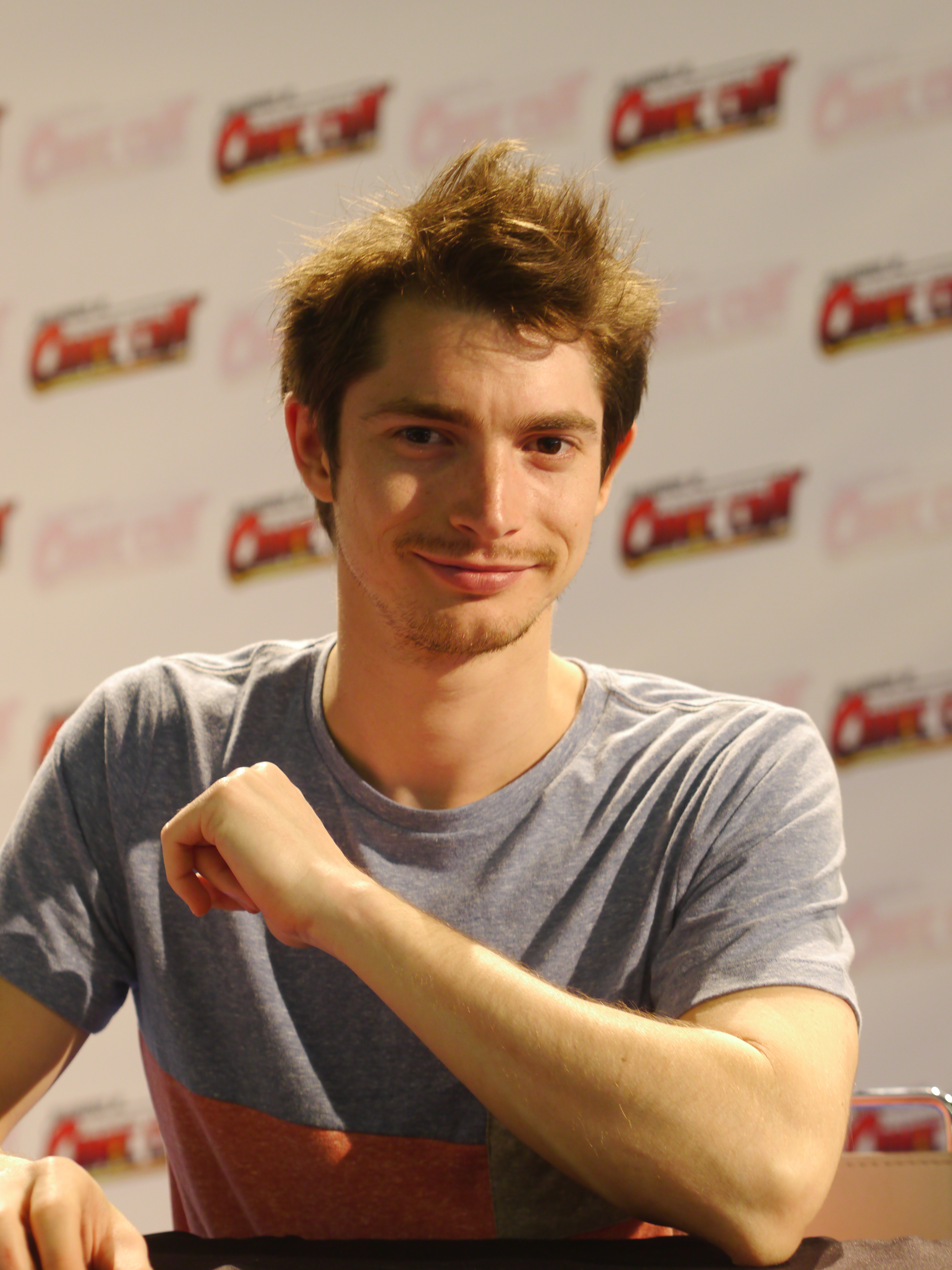
- Dorin at the 2013 Comic Con Paris
- Born: 30 December 1985 (age 40); Paris, France
- Occupations: Actor; Musician
- Notable work: The Visitor from the Future; J'ai jamais su dire non; La Théorie des balls; Le Secret des balls

Florent Dorin (born 30 December 1985 in Paris) is a French actor and musician, known primarily for his role as The Visitor in the web series The Visitor from the Future directed by François Descraques. He is also a member of the artistic collective Frenchnerd.

== Background ==
Florent Dorin spent his childhood shuttling back and forth between Paris and the commune of Dinan. At the age of 12, he began to make videos with his friend François Descraques and developed a taste for acting. But it was only in 2002 (at the age of 17), while shooting Les Chroniques de l'Étrange, that he considered making a career out of it.

He performed in several plays as well as in some short films, and got into the Conservatoire national supérieur d'art dramatique in 2009.

During the same period of time, he took part in various Frenchnerd projects, including the very successful web series The Visitor from the Future directed by François Descraques, from 2009 to 2014. He later joined the cast of La Théorie des balls directed by Slimane-Baptiste Berhoun and Rock Macabre directed by François Descraques.

Since then, he has kept on contributing to theater, street theater as well as other web series and short films. From 2015 to 2018, he performed in Homer's Iliad at the Théâtre de Belleville in Paris; and in Odyssey since 2017. Those two productions were directed by Pauline Bayle with Florent Dorin and other actors alternating characters irrespective of their age, gender or social rank.

He is also a musician and singer, and has released several EPs.

== Filmography ==
=== Film ===
Year	Title	Role	Director	Notes
2002–2005	Les Chroniques de l'Étrange		François Descraques	Short film
2003	L'Éternel Combat		François Descraques	Short film
2003	Assurance vie		M. Baradel	Short film
2005	Le Couteau sous la couette		Julien Diaz, François Descraques	Short film
2005	Il est où ton pote super mignon?		M. Marchal	Short film
2008	Le jour où je suis tombé amoureux		J. Borvon	Short film
2009	Destination Pluton		François Descraques	Short film
2009	S^{t} Jacut-de-la-mer		François Descraques	Short film
2009	Mémoire		L. Bourven	Short film
2010	Coyotes		J. Minster	Short film
2010–2011	Starleague		François Descraques	Short film
2011	L'Holocube		François Descraques	Short film
2011	Bonne nouvelle		François Descraques	Short film
2012	Nous ne ferons pas d'histoires		Julie Debiton	Short film
2013	Modern Day Prince Charming		Suricate	Short film
2013	Le Métronome		Ça va le faire	Short film
2014	FRENCHBALL – Le coup d'envoi		Frenchball	Short film
2014	Le paramétrage de la vie		Raphaël Descraques	Short film
2014	Reign of Kids		Raphaël Descraques	Short film
2015	La chasse aux canards		François Descraques	Short film
2015	Je suis un tombeur		Juliette Tresanini	Short film
2015	Noise & Confusion		Leo Wolfenstein, Guillaume Devallois	Short film
2015	The Nobodies	Himself	Suricate	
2017	Dans les films		Jérémy Strohm	Short film; Le temps mort
2022	The Visitor from the Future	The Visitor	François Descraques	

=== Web series ===
Year	Title	Role	Director	Notes
2009–2014	The Visitor from the Future	The Visitor	François Descraques	
2010–2011	J'ai jamais su dire non		Slimane-Baptiste Berhoun	
2011–2012	42^{e} étage		Slimane-Baptiste Berhoun	
2012	Le Gichet		Slimane-Baptiste Berhoun	
2012	Golden Show		François Descraques	
2013	Hero Corp : les survivants		Simon Astier	
2015	La Théorie des balls		Slimane-Baptiste Berhoun	
2015	Rock Macabre		François Descraques	
2016	Le Secret des balls		Slimane-Baptiste Berhoun	
2019	Abonne-toi	Florent	Guillaume Cremonese	episode 2 : Seb la Frite nous accueille dans sa nouvelle maison

=== Television ===
Year	Title	Role	Notes
2011	Le Ciné du Comité		
2013	Jo	Yannick (voice)	

=== Dubbing ===
Year	Title	Role	Director	Notes
2011	Melancholia	Tim	Lars von Trier	
2012	The Angels' Share	Robbie	Ken Loach	
2014	Escobar: Paradise Lost	Dylan	Andrea Di Stefano	
2015	Youth	Jimmy Tree	Paolo Sorrentino	
2016	The Boy and the Beast	Jirōmaru (adult)	Mamoru Hosoda	
2017	The Man with the Iron Heart	Jozef Gabčík	Cédric Jimenez	

== Theatre ==
Year	Title	Role	Director	Author	Notes
2010	Iliad		Nada Strancar	Homer	
2010	La Troade		Nada Strancar	Robert Garnier	
2010	Un petit détournement		Sophie Mourousi	Sophie Mourousi	
2011	Mystère Pessoa		Stanislas Grassian	Fernando Pessoa, Stanislas Grassian	
2012–2013	Life Is a Dream		Jacques Vincey	Pedro Calderón de la Barca	
2013	Berenice		Yannik Landrein	Jean Racine	
2014	Immortels		Nasser Djemaï	Nasser Djemaï	
2015–2018	Iliad		Pauline Bayle	Homer	
2017–2018	Odyssey		Pauline Bayle	Homer	

== Discography ==
- Florent Dorin (2009)
- Finally (2014)
- Halfway (2020)
