= Ulf Friberg =

Swedish actor, screenwriter, theatre and film director

- Born: 4 October 1962 (age 63); Nässjö, Sweden

Ulf Sven Friberg (born 4 October 1962) is a Swedish actor, screenwriter, theatre and film director.

Friberg studied in Malmö 1986–89. After that, he was engaged at Stockholm City Theatre. He has also worked at the Orion Theatre in Stockholm and Folkteatern in Gothenburg. He has participated in Alla mina söner and Kung Lear at the Royal Dramatic Theatre in Stockholm.

== Selected filmography ==
- Hjälten (1990) - Jimmi
- Jag skall bli Sveriges Rembrandt eller dö! (1990) - Edvard Casparsson
- Kejsarn av Portugallien (1992) - August Olsson
- Jönssonligan och den svarta diamanten (1992) - Student
- Mannen på balkongen (1993) - Åke Persson
- Jerusalem (1996) - Ingmar
- Slutspel (1997) - Janne
- Syndare i sommarsol (2001) - Möllendorf
- Klassfesten (2002) - Tommy
- Stora teatern (2002, TV Mini-Series) - Jan
- Beck – Pojken i glaskulan (2002, TV Series) - Kaj Gerstedt
- Evil (2003) - Tranströmer
- Tusenbröder (2003, TV Series) - Lars
- En familj (2004) - Tomas
- Ring kåta Clarissa (2004)
- Kronprinsessan (2006, TV Mini-Series) - Thomas Ekeblad
- Exit (2006) - Philip Ceder
- Wallander – Hemligheten (2006, TV Series) - Lasse Bengtsson
- Upp till kamp (2007, TV Mini-Series) - Jonny Lindman
- Främmande fågel (2008-2016, TV Series) - Ek
- Murder in Sweden (2008-2018, TV Series) - Ek
- De halvt dolda (2009, TV Mini-Series) - Erik
- Stockholm East (2011) - Nybliven pappa
- The Girl with the Dragon Tattoo (2011) - Wennerström
- Hamilton: In the Interest of the Nation (2012) - Tomas Gayber
- Stockholm Stories (2013) - Lenas make

== Filmmaking ==
- No Place Like Home (Borta bra) - 2008, director and writer
