= Lars Jönsson (film producer) =

Swedish film producer

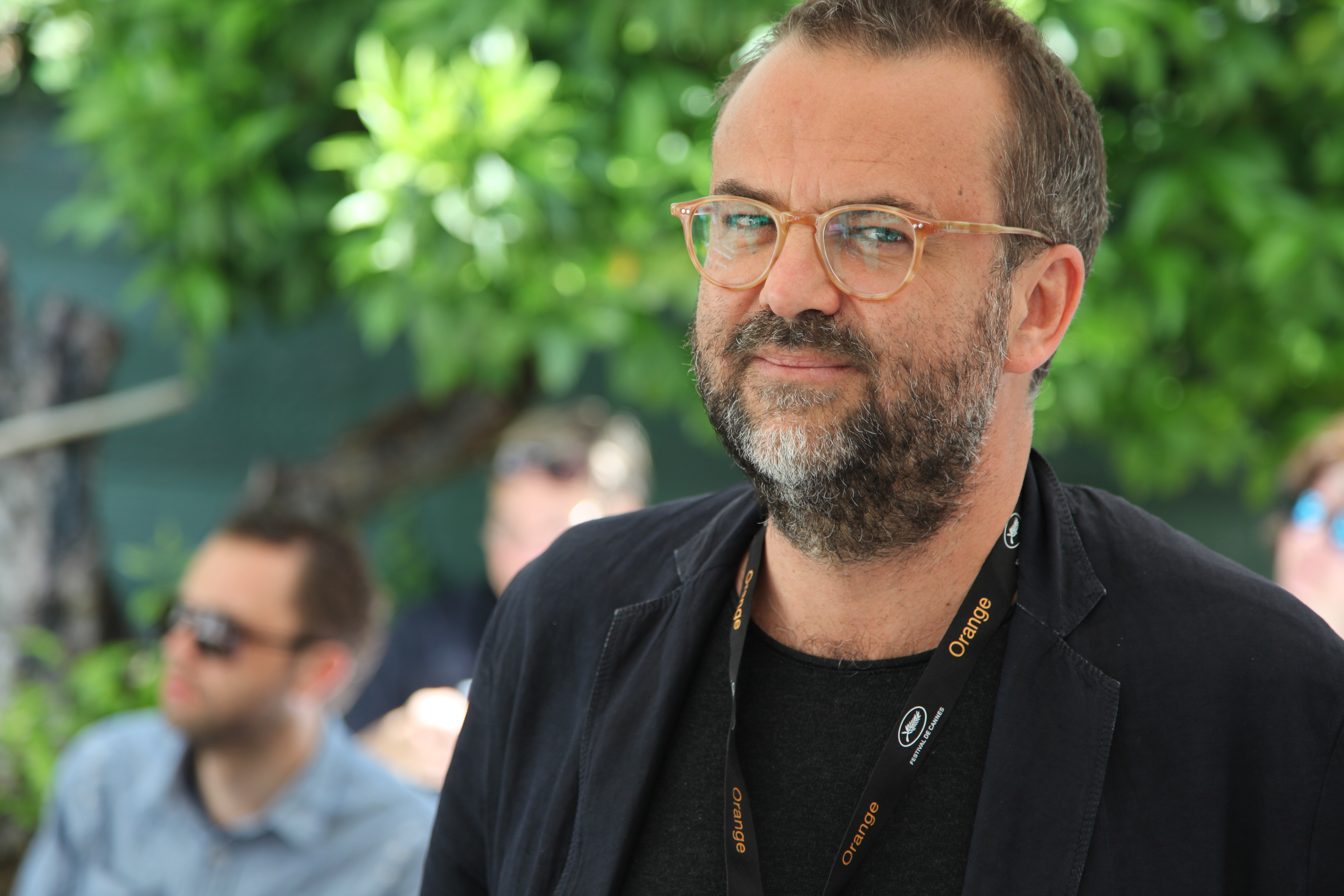
- Lars Jönsson (2012)
- Born: 4 September 1961 (age 64); Sweden
- Occupation: Film producer

Lars Jönsson (born 4 September 1961) is a Swedish film producer connected to Memfis Film and the "Trollywood" facilities. Since the early 1990s he has been the producer of several films in Sweden and Scandinavia, being the usual producer for among others Lukas Moodysson, Josef Fares and Maria Blom, while also having co-produced many films by Lars von Trier.

== Filmography ==
- House of Angels (Änglagård) (1992) (executive producer)
- Dreamplay (Drømspel) (1994) (producer)
- Harry och Sonja (1996) (producer)
- Breaking the Waves (1996) (executive producer)
- Talk (Bara prata lite) (1997) (producer)
- The Last Viking (Den Sidste viking) (1997) (executive producer)
- Tiger Heart (Tigerhjärta) (1997) (producer)
- Tranceformer - A Portrait of Lars von Trier (1997) (producer)
- H.C. Andersen's The Long Shadow (H.C. Andersen og den skæve skygge) (1998) (co-producer)
- Lucky People Center International (1998) (producer)
- Show Me Love (Fucking Åmål) (1998) (producer)
- Love Fools (Hela härligheten) (1998) (producer)
- A Summer Tale (Den Bästa sommaren) (2000) (producer)
- Hundhotellet (2000) (producer)
- The Best Man's Wedding (Jalla! Jalla!) (2000) (executive producer)
- Prop and Berta (Prop og Berta) (2000) (co-producer)
- Together (Tillsammans) (2000) (producer)
- Dancer in the Dark (2000) (co-executive producer)
- Chop Chop (Fukssvansen) (2001) (co-producer)
- Bear's Kiss (2002) (co-producer)
- Lilya 4-ever (Lilja 4-ever) (2002) (producer)
- Catch That Girl (Klatretøsen) (2002) (co-producer)
- Dogville (2003) (co-executive producer)
- Skagerrak (2003) (executive producer)
- Kopps (2003) (executive producer)
- It's All About Love (2003) (co-producer)
- Dalecarlians (Masjävlar) (2004) (producer)
- A Hole in My Heart (Ett hål i mitt hjärta) (2004) (producer)
- Fragile (2004) (executive producer)
- Zozo (2005) (executive producer)
- Manderlay (2005) (co-producer)
- Next Door (Naboer) (2005) (co-executive producer)
- Krama mig (2005) (producer)
- Falkenberg Farewell (Farväl Falkenberg) (2006) (executive producer)
- Container (2006) (executive producer) (producer)
- Leo (2007) (executive producer)
- Nina Frisk (2007) (producer)
- Island of Lost Souls (De fortabte sjæles ø) (2007) (executive producer)
- Fishy (2008) (producer)
- Antichrist (2009) (co-producer)
- Mammoth (2009) (producer)
- Together 99 (Tillsammans 99) - 2023
