= Sam Kessel =

Swedish actor

Sam Einar Lippy Kessel (born 24 May 1989 in Uppsala, Sweden) is a Swedish actor, well known for his role as Per Hammar in the Tsatsiki series of films based on the books written by Moni Nilsson-Brännström.

In spring 2007, he appeared in the play Vinterkärlek by "Teater C" at the Reginateatern in Uppsala. In spring 2008, "Teater C" performed their second play, Avslutningen, a monologue supplied by Kessel, and written and directed by Dag Thelander.

Lately, Kessel has been engaged in performance poetry, specifically poetry slam; on 2 March 2008, he won a contest in Uppsala. In May 2009 he, Linn Bleckert and Li Molnar Kronlid won the gold medal at the Triathlon of the Swedish Poetry Slam Championships in Norrköping. In 2010, he organized the Swedish Poetry Slam Championships at the Reginateatern.

== Selected filmography ==
- 2005 - Livet enligt Rosa (TV)
- 2003 - Dag och natt
- 2001 - Tsatsiki – vänner för alltid
- 2001 - Familjehemligheter
- 2000 - Tillsammans
- 1999 - Tsatsiki, morsan och polisen
