= John Axel Eriksson =

Swedish actor

John Axel Eriksson (born 5 January 1978 in Falkenberg) is a Swedish actor.

== Filmography ==
- Beck – Den svaga länken (2007)
- Falkenberg Farewell (2006)
