= Day and Night (2004 Swedish film) =

- Directed by: Simon Staho
- Written by: Peter Asmussen; Per Nielsen; Simon Staho
- Produced by: Anne Katrine Andersen; Peter Aalbaek Jensen
- Starring: Mikael Persbrandt; Sam Kessel; Maria Bonnevie; Michael Nyqvist
- Cinematography: Kim Hogh
- Edited by: Asa Mossberg
- Music by: Joachim Holbek
- Release date: 6 August 2004
- Running time: 95 minutes
- Country: Sweden
- Language: Swedish

Day and Night (Swedish: Dag och natt) is a 2004 Swedish drama film directed by Simon Staho.

== Plot ==
Thomas embarks on a journey to connect one final time with each of the meaningful people in his life. Hating the man he's become, he ends the tour by committing suicide—-an event foretold in the film's opening narration.

== Cast ==
- Mikael Persbrandt as Thomas
- Sam Kessel as Emil
- Maria Bonnevie as Sarah
- Michael Nyqvist as Jacob
- Lena Endre as Anna
- Hans Alfredson as Bilisten
- Pernilla August as Eva
- Fares Fares as Kristian
- Marie Göranzon as Modern
- Tuva Novotny as Desiré
- Erland Josephson as narrator (voice)
