= Together (2000 film) =

2000 Swedish comedy-drama film by Lukas Moodysson

- Theatrical release poster
- Swedish: Tillsammans
- Directed by: Lukas Moodysson
- Written by: Lukas Moodysson
- Produced by: Lars Jönsson
- Starring: Lisa Lindgren; Michael Nyqvist; Emma Samuelsson; Sam Kessel
- Cinematography: Ulf Brantås
- Production companies: Memfis Film; Zentropa Entertainments; Film i Väst; SVT Drama; Nordisk Film & TV Fond; Svenska Filminstitutet; Det Danske Filminstitut; TV1000
- Distributed by: Sonet Film
- Release date: 25 August 2000 (Sweden)
- Running time: 106 minutes
- Countries: Sweden; Denmark; Italy
- Language: Swedish
- Box office: $14.6 million

Together (Swedish: Tillsammans) is a comedy-drama film, which was released to cinemas in Sweden on 25 August 2000. It is Swedish director Lukas Moodysson's second full-length film. Set in a Stockholm commune called "Tillsammans" (Swedish for "Together") in 1975, it is a satirical view of socialist values and a bittersweet comedy. Moodysson filmed a sequel titled Together 99 that was released in 2023.

== Plot ==
Together is set in one of the sharehome communes that was created around Stockholm in the 1970s. Loosely led by the kind-natured Göran, who will do anything to avoid a conflict, the group spend their time arguing about left-wing politics and other more practical issues, such as whether doing the dishes is bourgeois. The sharehome's dynamics are significantly shaken when Göran's sister, Elisabeth, leaves her violent husband Rolf and moves in, bringing her two children Eva and Stefan.

Self-declared lesbian Anna lives in the commune with her ex-husband Lasse and their son Tet (named after the Tet Offensive), who befriends Stefan. The two play games such as "torture the Pinochet victim" where, in the spirit of equality, they take turns at being Augusto Pinochet. Eva meanwhile befriends a lonely boy across the street named Fredrik; his family appears conventional on the surface but proves to be even more dysfunctional than the commune of which they so openly disapprove. The children are portrayed as sidelined by everyone in the film, from the new school where they are bullied to the parents who, while genuinely loving, are too busy experimenting with their own freedom to show it.

Elisabeth's husband Rolf makes a concerted effort to clean up his act, although not before getting drunk and arrested, leaving his children stranded on a roadside after a disastrous meal in a Chinese restaurant. Further relationship problems are found with Klas, who is desperately in love with Lasse, and between Göran and his selfish and immature girlfriend, who wants the benefits of an open relationship but not the responsibilities.

== Selected cast ==
- Lisa Lindgren as Elisabeth
- Michael Nyqvist as Rolf, Elisabeth's husband
- Emma Samuelsson as Eva, Elisabeth's and Rolf's daughter
- Sam Kessel as Stefan, Elisabeth's and Rolf's son
- Gustaf Hammarsten as Göran, Elisabeth's brother
- Jessica Liedberg as Anna
- Ola Rapace (credited as Ola Norell) as Lasse
- Axel Zuber as Tet, Anna and Lasse's son
- Shanti Roney as Klas
- Olle Sarri as Erik Andersson
- Anja Lundqvist as Lena, Göran's girlfriend
- Sten Ljunggren as Birger
- Cecilia Frode as Signe
- Lars Frode as Sigvard
- Emil Moodysson as Måne
- Henrik Lundström as Fredrik

== Production ==
Although set in Stockholm in eastern Sweden, the film was actually shot in western Sweden, mainly in cities Trollhättan and Gothenburg. Filming began on 27 October 1999 and wrapped 20 December 1999. Artist Carl Johan De Geer created the film's contemporary environments.

The character "Birger" previously appeared in Moodysson's short film 'Talk' (Bara prata lite) in 1997, where he was also played by Sten Ljunggren.

== Reception ==
=== Critical reception ===
The film received critical acclaim. Rotten Tomatoes gives the film a score of 90% based on reviews from 79 critics, with an average rating of 7.2/10. The website's critical consensus reads "Managing to be both satirical and warm-hearted in its look at the inhabitants of a commune, Together successfully captures the spirit of a time." On Metacritic, the film has a weighted average score of 84 out of 100, based on 29 critics, indicating "universal acclaim".

The New York Times called Together "A funny, graceful and immensely good-natured work", while Salon described it as "The kind of picture that makes you feel that there are many good reasons to actually like mankind."

=== Box office ===
The film opened on 87 screens in Sweden and grossed $506,479 in its opening weekend. It was number one at the box office in Sweden and grossed $6.4 million from 880,000 admissions. It grossed $1.3 million in Norway, $1 million in the United States and Canada and almost $1 million in the United Kingdom, for a worldwide total of $14.6 million.

== Soundtrack ==
- ABBA – "SOS"
- Maggie Bell – "Caddo Queen"
- Hoola Bandoola Band – "Vem kan man lita på?"
- Pugh Rogefeldt – "Här kommer natten"
- Ted Gärdestad – "Jag vill ha en egen måne"
- Tony Hung – "Paddy Fields No. 1"
- Peps Blodsband – "Onådens år"
- Nazareth – "Love Hurts"
- International Harvester – "It's Only Love"
- Ted Gärdestad – "Så mycket bättre"
- Bo Hansson – "The Black Riders (Flight to the Ford)"
- Shit & Chanel – "Jorden Vinden Fuglene"
- Shit & Chanel – "Fandango"
- Bo Hansson – "Leaving Shire"
- Nationalteatern – "Hanna från Arlöv"
- Tony Hung – "Morning Stroll"
- Bo Hansson – "At the House of Elrond and the Ring Goes South"
- Marie Selander – "Vi är många"
- Turid – "Song"
- Ted Gärdestad – "Come Give Me Love"

== Sequel ==
In 2022, Moodysson filmed a sequel to the film, titled Together 99. It was released in 2023. The sequel is set in 1999 and follows Göran and Klas as they establish a new commune. Most of the actors returned, with the exception of the children, Michael Nyqvist, who died in 2017, and Ola Rapace, whose role of Lasse was recast with actor Jonas Karlsson.
