= Gustaf Hammarsten =

Swedish actor

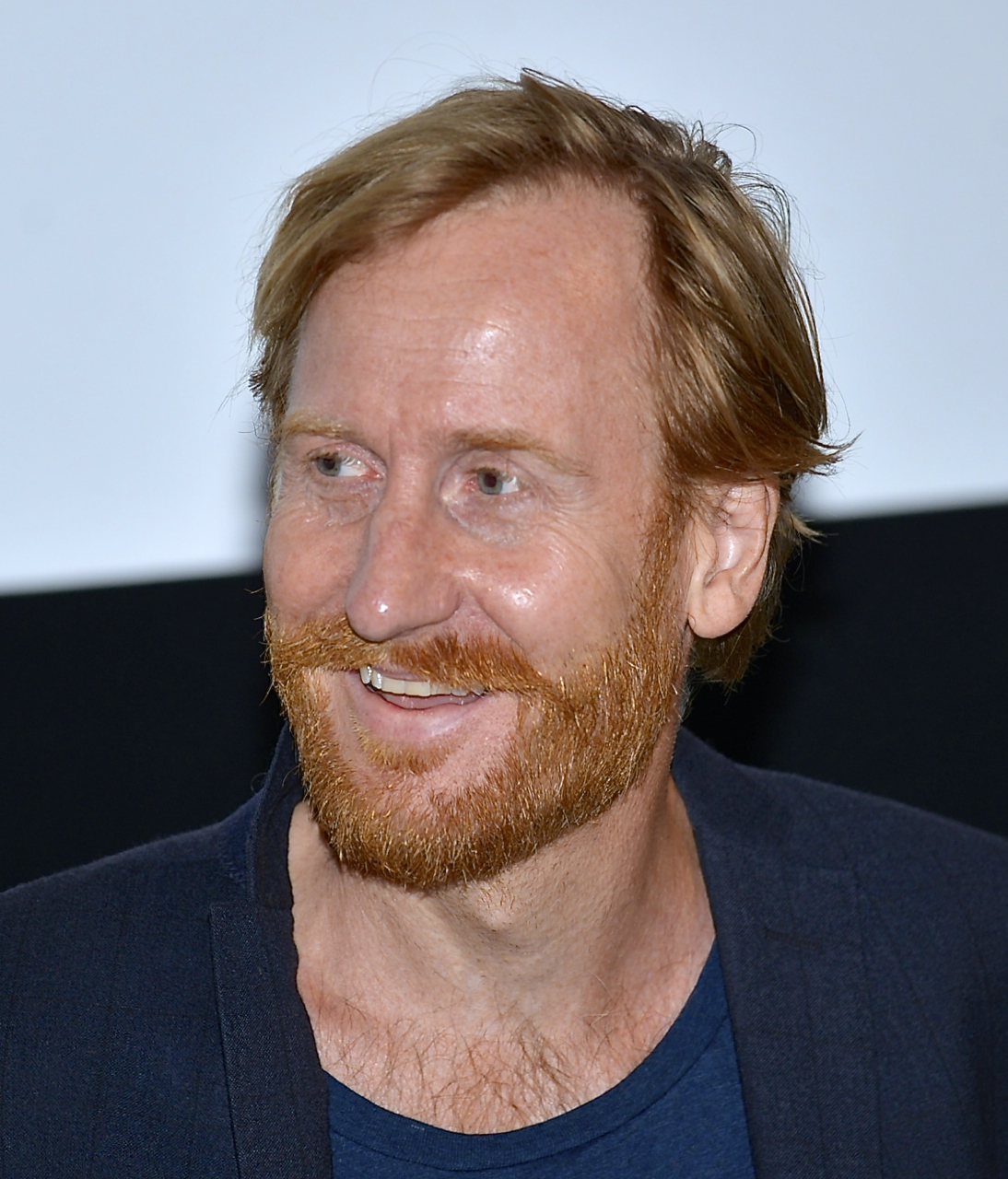
- Hammarsten in 2014
- Born: Carl Gustaf Hammarsten; 2 September 1967 (age 58); Stockholm, Sweden
- Occupation: Actor
- Years active: 1991–present
- Partner: Jessica Liedberg

Carl Gustaf Hammarsten (born 2 September 1967) is a Swedish film, television and theatre actor. He is internationally known for his role in Brüno (2009) as the title character's sidekick and gay lover.

== Career ==
=== Film ===
He has appeared in more than ten films, starting with a small role in The Best Intentions (1992) directed by Bille August. He is best known for his appearance in Together (2000) directed by Lukas Moodysson. He has a small role in the movie Old (2021)

Hammarsten made his international film début in Brüno (2009) as Lutz, the title character's sidekick. He has since appeared as the young Harald in David Fincher's remake of The Girl with the Dragon Tattoo, Kursk, Old, Lord of Chaos and Stockholm.

In 2023 he appeared in Together 99 (Tillsammans 99), reprising his role as Göran from Together.

=== Television ===
In Swedish television he became known through the comedy show Cleo. He has also made numerous appearances in television programs. He appeared in the first episode of Crimes of Passion. Since 2013 he acts in the series Fröken Frimans krig. He participated in the Let's Dance 2018 broadcast on TV4. In 2023 he played the role of one of the lead scientists in the NBC true crime drama series Dr. Death.

=== Theatre ===
Hammarsten is connected with the Stockholm City Theatre.
