= Henrik Lundström =

Swedish actor (born 1983)

Per Henrik Lundström (born 13 December 1983) is a Swedish actor. He was educated at Sankt Eriks gymnasium in Stockholm.

== Filmography ==
- 2000 - Tillsammans
- 2003 - Ondskan
- 2003 - Sprickorna i muren
- 2004 - Graven (TV)
- 2004 - Håkan Bråkan & Josef
- 2005 - Kocken
- 2006 - Göta kanal 2 – Kanalkampen
- 2007 - Darling
- 2008 - Kärlek 3000
- 2013 - Studentfesten
- 2013 - The Bridge (2011 TV series) (series 2)
- 2015 - The Bridge (2011 TV series) (series 3)
- 2016 - The Inspector and the Sea
- 2017 - The Last Kingdom (TV series)
- 2023 - Together 99 (Tillsammans 99)
