= Jessica Liedberg =

Swedish actress (born 1969)

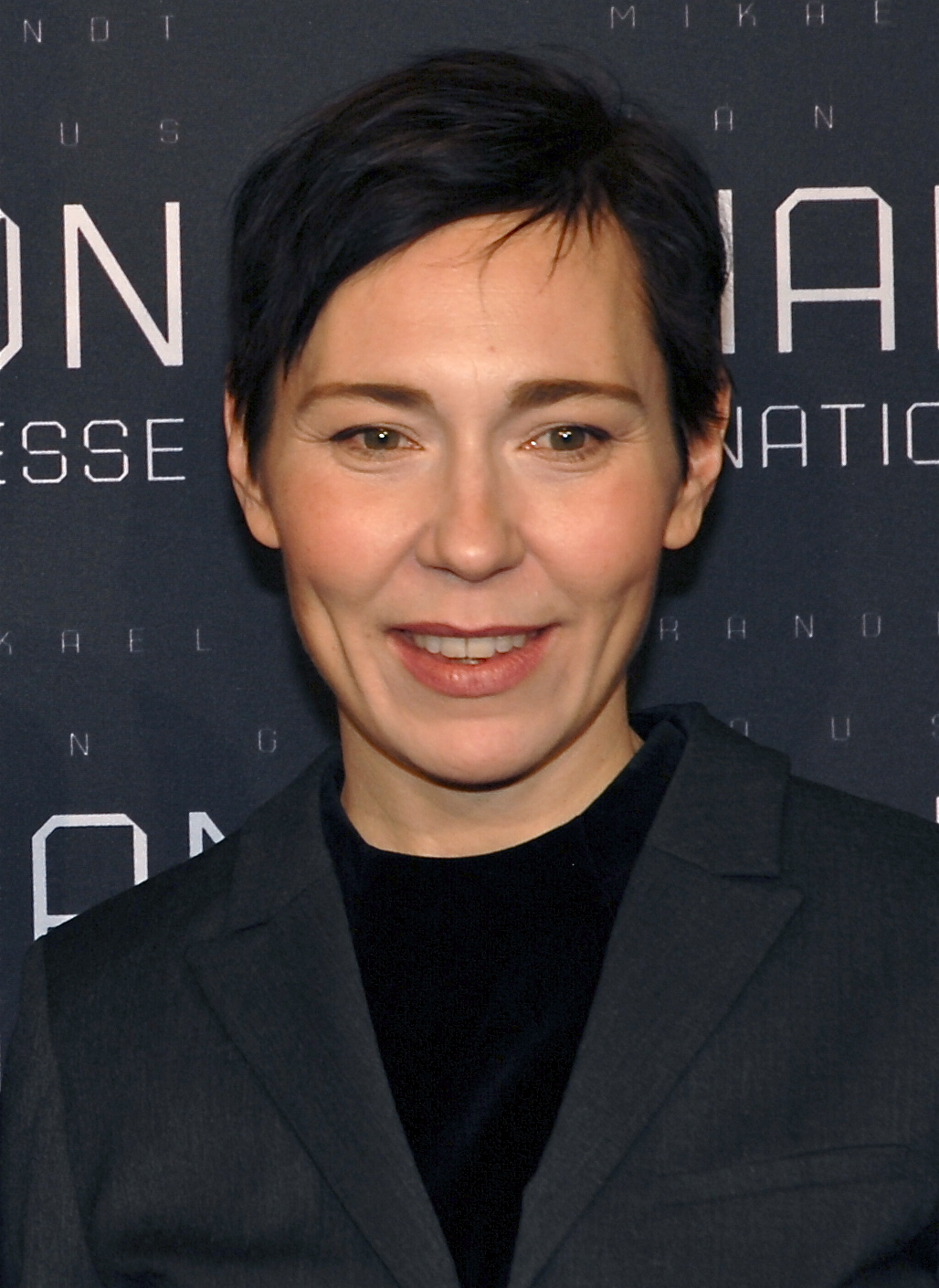
- Liedberg in 2012
- Born: Jessica Martina Liedberg; 7 October 1969 (age 56); Mölndal, Sweden
- Occupation: Actress
- Years active: 1992–present
- Partner: Gustaf Hammarsten

Jessica Martina Liedberg (born 7 October 1969) is a Swedish actress. She graduated from the Swedish National Academy of Mime and Acting in 1992. She and her husband Gustaf Hammarstein have four daughters.

She was nominated for Best Supporting Actress for Together 99 at the 59th Guldbagge Awards.

== Selected filmography ==
- 1992 - Vi ses i Krakow
- 1996 - Älvakungen dyker upp
- 1998 - Waiting for the Tenor
- 2000 - Together (Tillsammans)
- 2000–2002 - Rederiet (TV)
- 2004 - Slut
- 2009 - Bröllopsfotografen
- 2012 - Kontoret (TV)
- 2018 - Gråzon (TV)
- 2021 – Knutby (TV)
- 2022 – Riding in Darkness (TV)
- 2023 - Together 99 (Tillsammans 99)
- 2025 - The Breakthrough
