= So Damn Easy Going =

2022 Norwegian drama film

- Swedish: Så jävla easy going
- Directed by: Christoffer Sandler
- Written by: Christoffer Sandler; Lina Åström; Jessika Jankert; Linda-Maria Birbeck
- Produced by: Annika Hellström; Erika Malmgren
- Starring: Nikki Hanseblad; Melina Paukkonen
- Cinematography: Nea Asphäll
- Edited by: Jens Christian Fodstad; Robert Krantz
- Music by: Gustaf Spetz
- Production companies: Cinenic Film; Film i Väst; Hummelfilm
- Release date: 28 January 2022 (GFF)
- Running time: 91 minutes
- Countries: Sweden, Norway
- Language: Swedish

So Damn Easy Going (Swedish: Så jävla easy going) is a 2022 Swedish-Norwegian comedy-drama film directed by Christoffer Sandler.

== Plot ==
Teenager Joanna (Nikki Hanseblad) has ADHD (Attention Deficit Hyperactivity Disorder), and needs medication to calm her fast-paced brain. She lives with her depressed father, who is unable to work. Joanna tries in every way to get money and her medication. In all this confusion, she meets the charming and stable Audrey (Melina Benett Paukkonen), but falling in love is not just a breeze.

The film, based on the eponymous youth bestseller by Swedish author Jenny Jägerfeld, is a funny, bitter and genuine drama about growing up as a girl who has no choice but to be who she is.

== Cast ==
- Nikki Hanseblad – Joanna
- Melina Benett Paukkonen – Audrey
- Emil Algpeus – Matheus
- Shanti Roney – Pappa
- Zara Martinsson – Mikaela
