= Samuel Haus =

Swedish actor (born 1990)

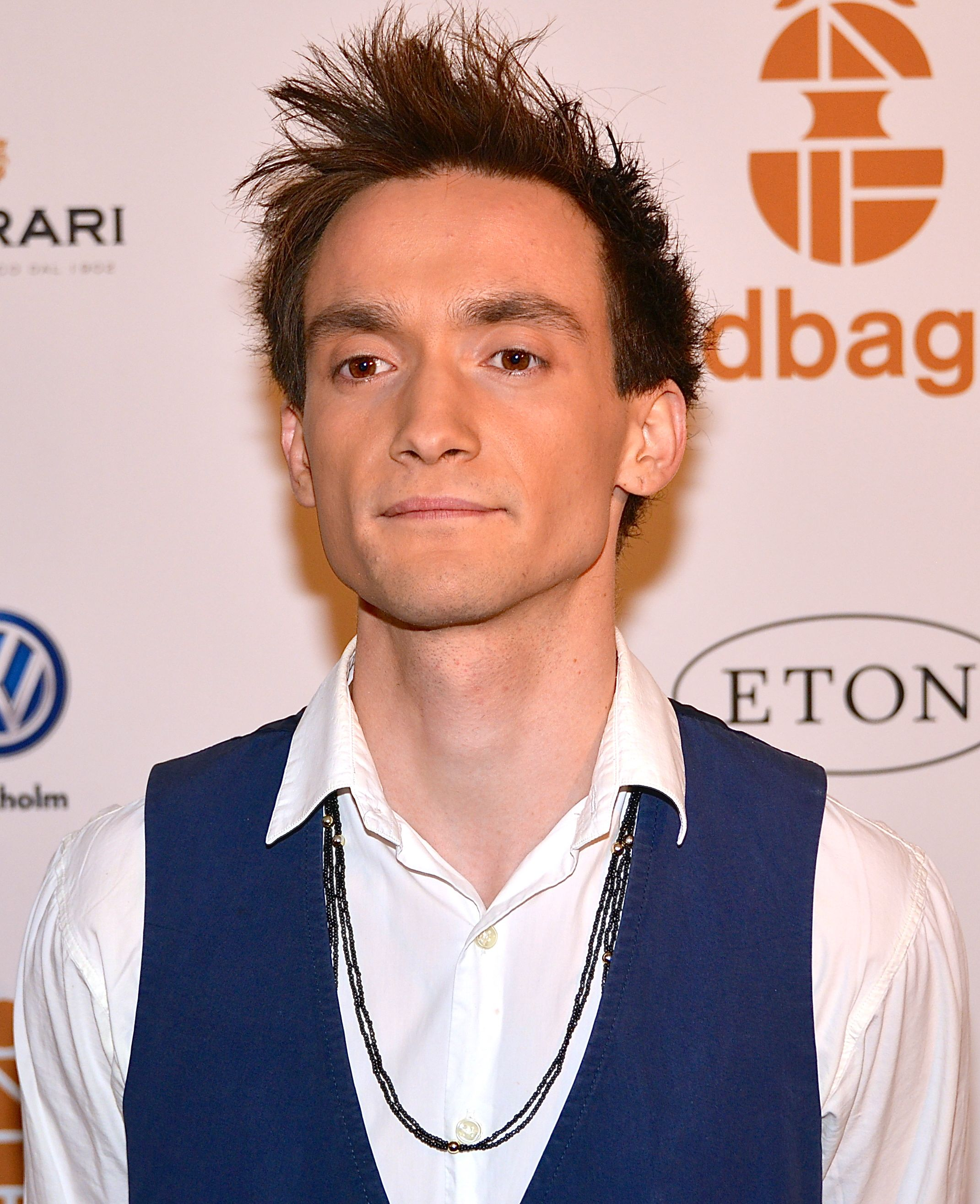
Samuel Haus at Guldbaggegalan 2013

Mihai Samuel Haus (born 1 April 1990 in Iaşi, Romania) is a Swedish actor. He is most known for portraying the role of Tsatsiki in the Swedish film Tsatsiki, Morsan och Polisen. Haus was a member of the Swedish music group SLAM in 2000 and was nominated for a Swedish Grammy Award in 2001 for Child of the Year.

== Filmography ==
- 1999 - Tsatsiki, morsan och polisen
- 2001 - Tsatsiki – vänner för alltid
- 2009 - Glowing Stars (Original title: I taket lyser stjärnorna)
- 2009 - The Ape (Original title: Apan)
- 2013 - Orion
- 2017 - Ingen så fin som du
- 2019 - King of Atlantis (Original title: Kungen av Atlantis
