= Hallin =

Hallin may refer to:

== Locations ==
- Hallin, historic name of Halland County, Sweden, especially its southern part
- Hallin, Isle of Skye, township in Scotland
- Hallin Fell, hill in the English Lake District

== People ==
- Hallin (surname), list of people with the name

== Academia ==
- Hallin's spheres, journalistic theory of news reporting
