= Shanti Roney =

Swedish actor (born 1970)

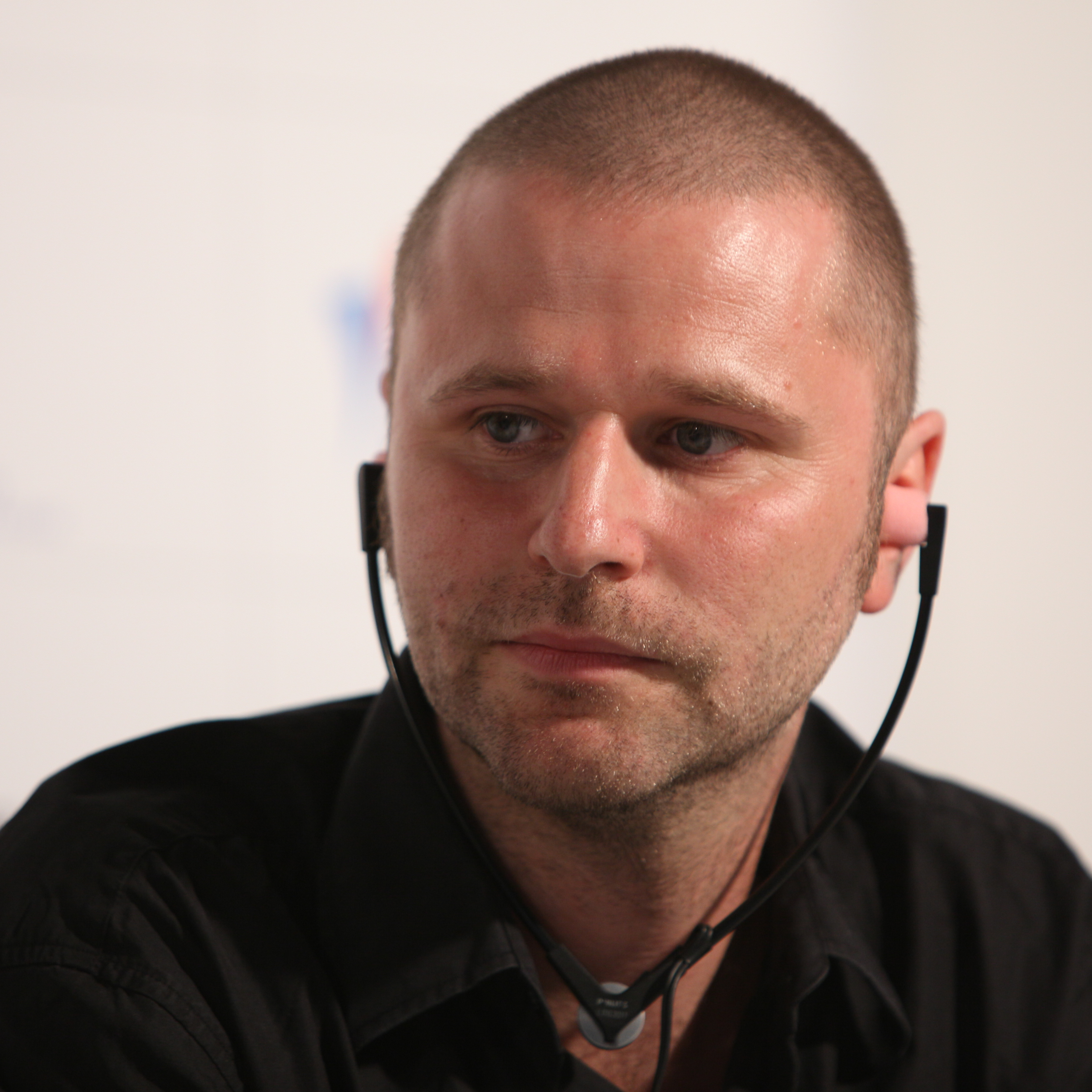
- Shanti Roney at 2009 KVIFF.
- Born: Shanti Grau Roney; 24 November 1970 (age 55); Spånga, Stockholm Municipality, Sweden
- Occupation: Actor
- Years active: 1996–present
- Relatives: Marimba (sister)

Shanti Grau Roney (born 24 November 1970) is a Swedish actor. While his film credits include nearly twenty movies, most of these have been limited to a domestic or Scandinavian release. One notable exception is Lukas Moodysson's film Together (2000) which gathered acclaim at film festivals worldwide.

In television, he had a prominent role in the popular series Tusenbröder while also featuring in the Danish series The Eagle which won an International Emmy Award in 2005. In 2011, Roney had a leading role in Crime Drama Arne Dahl.

Shanti Roney is brother to Marimba Roney.

== Filmography ==
- Together 99 (Tillsammans 99) (2023) as Klasse
- So Damn Easy Going (2022)
- Tove (2020) as Atos Wirtanen
- Quicksand (2019)
- Stockholm (2018) as Olof Palme
- Pojken med guldbyxorna (2014) as Torkel
- Nymphomaniac (2013)
- Arne Dahl (2011) as Paul Hjelm (10 episodes)
- Oldboys (2009) as Engberg
- Metropia (2009) as (voice) Karl
- Applause (2009) as Tom
- The Girl (2009)
- Julia (2009) as Bruno
- Wallander as Ralf (1 episode, 2009)
  - - "Tjuven" (2009) (TV episode)
- Häxdansen (2008) (TV mini-series) as Peter Brandt
- Der Kommissar und das Meer as Per Bovide (1 episode, 2008)
  - - "Sommerzeit" (2008) (TV episode)
- En mand kommer hjem (2007) as The cook
  - a.k.a. A Man Comes Home (International: English title)
  - a.k.a. When a Man Comes Home (USA)
- Desmond & Träskpatraskfällan (2006) (voice)
  - a.k.a. Desmond & The Swamp Barbarian Trap (International: English title)
- Smagsdommerne as Løvborg (1 episode, 2006)
  - - Episode #3.8 (2006)
- Vakuum (2006) .... The man
- Ørnen: En krimi-odyssé as Benjamin Stern (3 episodes, 2005)
  - a.k.a. "Ørnen" (Denmark: short title)
  - a.k.a. "The Eagle" (International: English title)
  - - "Kodenavn: Erinye" - Del 11 (2005) TV episode
  - - "Kodenavn: Kronos" - Del 10 (2005) TV episode
  - - "Kodenavn: Kronos" - Del 9 (2005) TV episode
- Bang Bang Orangutang (2005) as Martin
- Desmonds trashade äppelträd (2004) (voice) as Desmond
  - a.k.a. Desmond's Trashed Apple Tree (International: English title)
- Hotet (2004) as Lasse Brunell
  - a.k.a. The Threat (International: English title)
  - a.k.a. Uhka (Finland)
- Kommer du med mig då (2003) as Theodor Marklund
  - a.k.a. Kehystetty rakkaus (Finland)
  - a.k.a. Make Believe (International: English title)
- Norrmalmstorg (2003) (TV) as Clark Olofsson
- Talismanen (2003) TV mini-series as Viktor
- Freddies och Leos äventyr (2003) (TV) as Berättare
  - a.k.a. The Adventures of Freddie and Leo (International: English title)
- Tusenbröder as Niklas (5 episodes, 2002)
  - a.k.a. "Tusenbröder II" (Sweden: second season title)
  - a.k.a. "Tusenbröder III" (Sweden: third season title)
  - - Tusenbröder - Del 5 (2002) TV episode
  - - Tusenbröder - Del 4 (2002) TV episode
  - - Tusenbröder - Del 3 (2002) TV episode
  - - Tusenbröder - Del 2 (2002) TV episode
  - - Tusenbröder - Del 1 (2002) TV episode
- Kaspar i Nudådalen as the Narrator (24 episodes, 2001)
  - - Episode #1.24 (2001) TV episode (voice)
  - - Episode #1.23 (2001) TV episode (voice)
  - - Episode #1.22 (2001) TV episode (voice)
  - - Episode #1.21 (2001) TV episode (voice)
  - - Episode #1.20 (2001) TV episode (voice) (19 more)
- Syndare i sommarsol (2001) as Alf
- Øyenstikker (2001) as Mann i leilighet
  - a.k.a. Dragonflies (UK)
  - a.k.a. Dragonfly (International: English title)
- Beck – Hämndens pris as Dag Sjöberg (1 episode, 2001)
- Så vit som en snö (2001) as Lars Andersson
  - a.k.a. As White as in Snow (International: English title)
  - a.k.a. Så hvid som sne (Denmark)
- Hans och hennes (2001) as Clarence
  - a.k.a. His and Hers (literal English title)
  - a.k.a. Making Babies (International: English title)
- En fot i graven (2001) (TV mini-series)
- Skuggpojkarna (2001) (TV) as Per
- Tillsammans (2000) as Klas
  - a.k.a. Together (International: English title) (Italy)
  - a.k.a. Tillsammans (Denmark)
- Födelsedagen (2000) as Peter
  - a.k.a. The Birthday (International: English title)
- Ett litet rött paket as Jesper Olsén (1 episode, 1999)
  - - "Drömmen om Elin" (1999) (TV episode)
- Clinch (1999) as Ralle
- Breaking Out (1999) as Glenn
- Personkrets 3:1 (1998) (TV) as Micke
- S:t Mikael as Nilsson (1 episode, 1998)
  - - Episode #1.5 (1998) (TV episode)
- Hammarkullen (1997) (TV mini-series) as Josef, Frank's son
  - a.k.a. "Vi ses i Kaliningrad!" (Sweden)
- Harry och Sonja (1996) as Jonathan

== Trivia ==
Roney played the role of Clark Olofsson in a 2003 TV movie about the 1973 Norrmalmstorg robbery, which coined the phrase "Stockholm syndrome".
