= The Ape (2009 film) =

Swedish film directed by Jesper Ganslandt

- Theatrical release poster
- Directed by: Jesper Ganslandt
- Written by: Jesper Ganslandt
- Produced by: Jesper Kurlandsky
- Starring: Olle Sarri
- Cinematography: Fredrik Wenzel
- Edited by: Jesper Ganslandt
- Music by: Erik Enocksson
- Production company: Fasad AB
- Distributed by: Nordisk Film
- Release dates: 3 September 2009 (Venice); 23 October 2009 (Sweden)
- Running time: 81 minutes
- Country: Sweden
- Language: Swedish

The Ape (Swedish: Apan) is a 2009 Swedish drama film directed by Jesper Ganslandt. It is Ganslandt's second feature film, following Falkenberg Farewell from 2006. Inspired by British director Mike Leigh, the film uses an unconventional method where the lead actor, Olle Sarri, wasn't allowed to read the script. Instead he was led to locations and instructed before the filming of each scene, unaware of the full plot until filming was completed. The title comes from an anecdote composer Erik Enocksson once told the director, where he while travelling on a packed bus suddenly got the feeling that all people around him were apes.

== Cast ==
- Olle Sarri as Krister
- Françoise Joyce as the mother
- Sean Pietrulewicz as the son
- Niclas Gillis as Jonas
- Samuel Haus as Jonas' friend
- Eva Rexed as driving school student
- Lennart Andersson as the neighbour
- Lena Carlsson as the wife
- Thore Flygel as salesman
- Anders Johannisson as man in the square
- Sonny Johnson as Police

== Release ==
The Ape premiered on 3 September 2009 at the Venice Film Festival, in the section Venice Days. It was subsequently shown as part of the Vanguard section at the 2009 Toronto International Film Festival and at the London International Film Festival, in October 2009.

== Reception ==
On review aggregator website Rotten Tomatoes, the film has a 100% approval rating based on 8 reviews, with an average rating of 7.3/10.
