= Maria Bonnevie =

Swedish-Norwegian actress (born 1973)

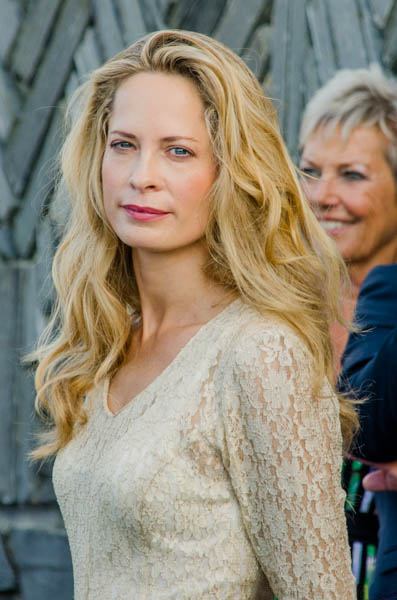
- Bonnevie at the 2014 San Sebastián International Film Festival
- Born: Anna Maria Cecilia Bonnevie; September 26, 1973 (age 52); Västerås, Sweden
- Occupation: Actress
- Years active: 1991–present
- Partners: Mikael Persbrandt (1998–2005); Fredrik Skavlan (2006–present)
- Children: 3
- Parents: Per Waldvik; Jannik Bonnevie

Anna Maria Cecilia Bonnevie (born 1973) is a Swedish-Norwegian actress. Bonnevie received both national and international acclaim for her performance in the Scandinavian epic I Am Dina and has since worked on a broad array of Scandinavian productions both in film, television and on stage.

== Early life ==
Anna Maria Cecilia Bonnevie was born in 1973 in Västerås to Swedish actor Per Waldvik and Norwegian actress Jannik Bonnevie.

She grew up in Oslo, Norway, where she attended Hartvig Nissen School. She graduated from the Swedish National Academy of Mime and Acting in 1997.

== Career ==
Bonnevie debuted on screen in 1991 in Hrafn Gunnlaugsson's The White Viking at the age of sixteen. In 1995, she debuted on stage at the Royal Dramatic Theatre in the play Yvonne, Princess of Burgundy directed by Ingmar Bergman. Her breakthrough role was in Bille August's Jerusalem, an adaptation of the Selma Lagerlöf novel.

In 2002, Bonnevie starred in Ole Bornedal's I Am Dina. For her performance, she received numerous accolades including the Amanda Award for Best Actress and the award for Best Foreign Actress at the Montreal International Film Festival. She was also nominated for a Bodil Award for Best Actress in a Leading Role as well as for a Robert Award for Best Actress in a Leading Role at the 2003 ceremonies. In 2002, she was named one of European film's Shooting Stars by European Film Promotion.

In 2004, she appeared in the Swedish film Dag och natt directed by Simon Staho alongside her then fiancée Mikael Persbrandt.

In 2007, she played the female lead in the Russian film The Banishment directed by Andrey Zvyagintsev.

The Karlovy Vary International Film Festival (KVIFF) invited Bonnevie to join the Grand Jury of the Festival's 44th edition in 2009.

In 2012, she played Countess Isolde in Belle du Seigneur alongside Jonathan Rhys-Meyers, Natalia Vodianova and Ed Stoppard. The same year she starred in the Norwegian drama All That Matters Is Past which features the on-screen birth of her son.

Bonnevie won the award for Best Supporting Actress at the 2019 Amanda Awards for her performance in Phoenix and was nominated for a Guldbagge Award for Best Actress in a Supporting Role at the 54th Guldbagge Awards for her role in Becoming Astrid as Astrid Lindgren's mother Hanna.

In 2020, Bonnevie appeared in the Academy Award-winning Danish feature Another Round, reuniting her with Mads Mikkelsen who she played opposite in I Am Dina. For her performance, she was nominated for a Robert Award for Best Supporting Actress.

She has been a part of the Royal Dramatic Theatre's ensemble cast since 1998.

== Personal life ==
Bonnevie is in a long-term relationship with Norwegian journalist and television host Fredrik Skavlan with whom she has 3 children, two daughters and a son. The couple split their time between Oslo and Stockholm. Between 1997 and 2005, she was in a relationship with Swedish actor Mikael Persbrandt.

== Acting credits ==
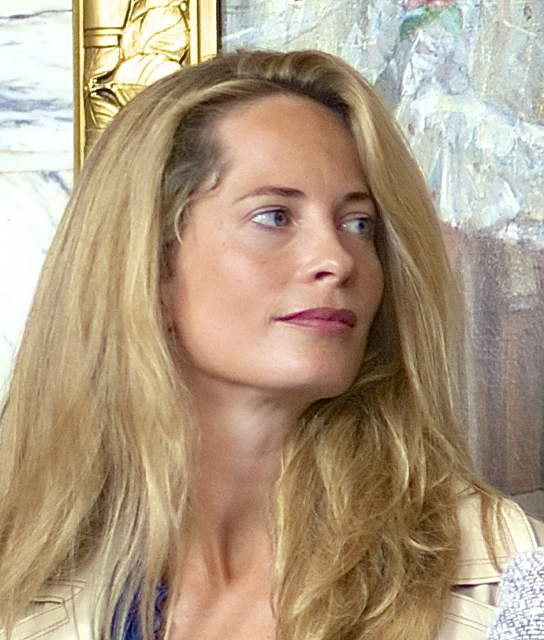
Bonnevie in August 2014

=== Film ===
Year	Title	Role	Notes
1991	The White Viking	Embla	
1991	The Polar Bear King	Princess	
1993	The Telegraphist	Pernille	
1996	Jerusalem	Gertrud	
1997	Insomnia	Ane	
1999	The 13th Warrior	Olga	
1999	Tsatsiki, morsan och polisen	Elin	
2001	Dragonfly	Maria	
2002	I Am Dina	Dina	Amanda Award for Best Actress; Nominated—Bodil Award for Best Actress in a Leading Role; Nominated—Robert Award for Best Actress in a Leading Role
2002	Falling Sky	Juni	
2003	I Am David	David's mother	
2003	Reconstruction	Simone/Aimee	two roles
2004	Three Suns	Emma	
2004	Day and Night	Sarah	
2007	The Banishment	Vera	
2008	What No One Knows	Ursula	
2009	Engelen	Lea (adult)	Nominated—Amanda Award for Best Actress
2010	Maskeblomstfamilien	Lillian Wang	Nominated—Amanda Award for Best Actress in a Supporting Role
2012	All That Matters Is Past	Janne	Nominated—Amanda Award for Best Actress
2012	Belle du Seigneur	Countess Isolde	
2014	A Second Chance	Anne	
2015	The Shamer's Daughter	Melussina Tonerre	
2018	Becoming Astrid	Hanna	Nominated—Guldbagge Award for Best Actress in a Supporting Role
2018	Phoenix	Astrid	Amanda Award for Best Actress in a Supporting Role
2020	Another Round	Anika	Nominated—Robert Award for Best Actress in a Leading Role

=== Television ===
Year	Title	Role	Notes
2009	Harry & Charles	Maud	Mini-series
2021–2023	Exit	Helene	5 episodes
2024	I kjærlighetens navn		
2024	Hjerte til hjerte	herself	10 episodes

=== Theatre ===
Year	Title	Role	Director	Location
1995	Yvonne, Princess of Burgundy		Ingmar Bergman	Royal Dramatic Theatre
1997	Allra käraste syster	Ylvali		Royal Dramatic Theatre
1997	The Cherry Orchard	Anja	‌Peter Langdal	Royal Dramatic Theatre
1998	An Enemy of the People	Petra	Stein Winge	Royal Dramatic Theatre
1999	Miss Eva		Eva Dahlman	Royal Dramatic Theatre
1999	Three Sisters	Irina		Royal Dramatic Theatre
2000	A Midsummer Night's Dream	Helena		Royal Dramatic Theatre
2002	Twelfth Night			Royal Dramatic Theatre
2005-06	Miss Julie	Miss Julie	Thommy Berggren	Royal Dramatic Theatre
2009	Autumn Sonata	Eva	Stefan Larsson	Royal Dramatic Theatre
2011	Hedda Gabler	Hedda	Eva Dahlman	Royal Dramatic Theatre
2024–25	A Streetcar Named Desire	Blanche DuBois	Marit Moum Aune	Christiania Theatre
