= Olle Sarri =

Swedish actor (born 1972)

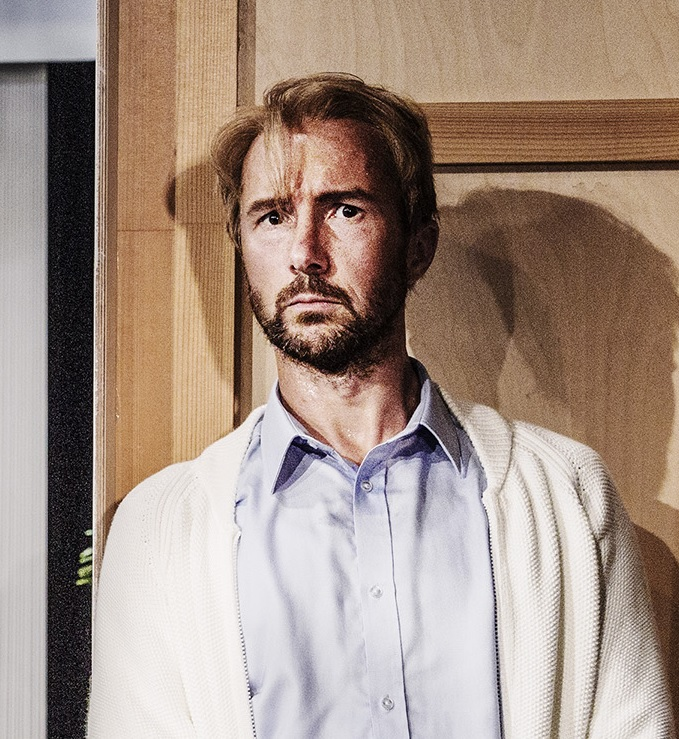
- Sarri in 2015.
- Born: Nils Olof Fabian Sarri; 20 January 1972 (age 54); Stockholm, Sweden
- Occupation: Actor
- Years active: 1978–present
- Spouse: Anna Littorin
- Children: 1
- Parent(s): Lasse Sarri, Inga Sarri

Nils Olof "Olle" Fabian Sarri (born 20 January 1972) is a Swedish actor. His mother Inga Sarri was also an actress.

== Filmography ==
=== Films ===
- 1989 - The Journey to Melonia
- 1996 - Monopol
- 1997 - Välkommen till festen
- 2000 - Together
- 2001 - Om inte
- 2006 - Kidz in da Hood
- 2009 - The Ape
- 2010 - Äntligen Midsommar
- 2016 - Sami Blood
- 2023 - Together 99 (Tillsammans 99)

=== Television ===
- 1978 – Olles mammas morbror
- 1998–2003 – c/o Segemyhr
- 2002 – Heja Björn
- 2020 – We got this
- 2021 – Snabba Cash
- 2024 – Veronika
- 2024 – Cry Wolf
