= Cecilia Frode =

Swedish actress

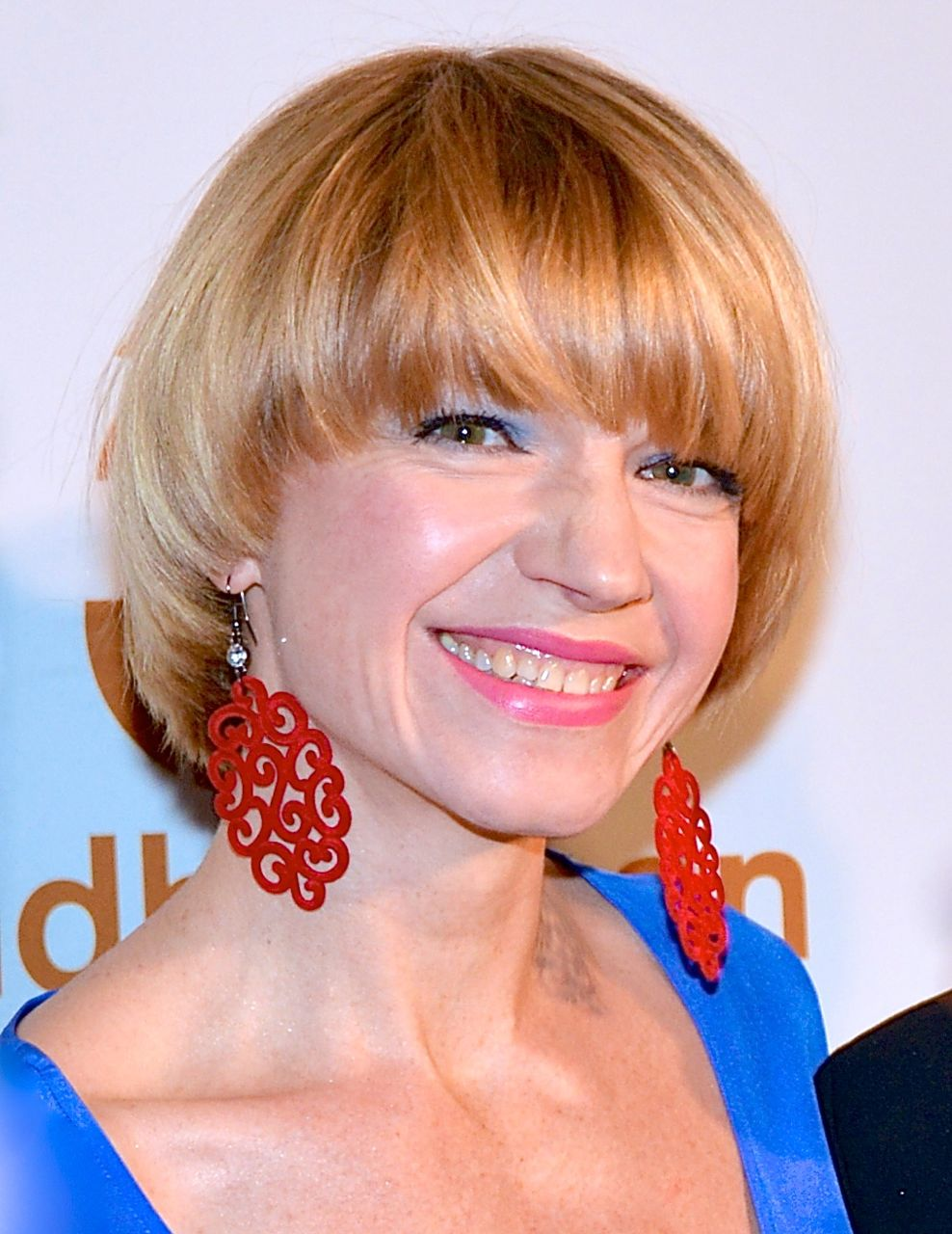
- Cecilia Frode in 2013.
- Born: Pia Ingela Cecilia Frode; 14 August 1970 (age 55); Linköping, Sweden
- Occupation: Actress
- Years active: 1994–

Pia Ingela Cecilia Frode is a Swedish actress born on 14 August 1970 in Linköping.

== Career ==
Frode graduated from the theatre school in Malmö in 1994. She also won a Guldbagge Award for Best Supporting Actress in the Swedish comedy film Klassfesten. On the theater stage, she has gained a reputation for her self-produced play "Ängelen" (The Angel) and is currently working on the new play "En stjärt på himlen" (A butt in the sky) in which she is alone on the stage, but accompanied by a four-man orchestra. She participated as a celebrity dancer in Let's Dance 2025 broadcast on TV4.

== Selected filmography ==
- 2000 - Klassfesten (The Class Reunion)
- 2000 - Together (Tillsammans)
- 2001 - Känd från TV (Known From TV)
- 2006 - Varannan vecka (Every Other Week)
- 2023 - Together 99 (Tillsammans 99)
