= All That Matters Is Past =

2012 film

- International theatrical poster
- Directed by: Sara Johnsen
- Written by: Sara Johnsen
- Starring: Maria Bonnevie
- Cinematography: John Andreas Andersen
- Release dates: 7 September 2012 (TIFF); 2 November 2012 (Norway)
- Running time: 105 minutes
- Country: Norway
- Language: Norwegian

All That Matters Is Past (Norwegian: Uskyld) is a 2012 Norwegian drama film directed by Sara Johnsen.

== Cast ==
- Maria Bonnevie as Janne
- Kristoffer Joner as William
- David Dencik as Ruud
- Maria Heiskanen as Ragnhild
- Tea Sandanger as Janne 14
- Åsmund Høeg as William 14
- Trond Nilssen as Ruud 18
- Line Billa Ljøstad as Janne 18
- Mads Sjøgård Pettersen as William 18
- Emil Johnsen as Mads
