= Inga Sarri =

Swedish actress (1934–2021)

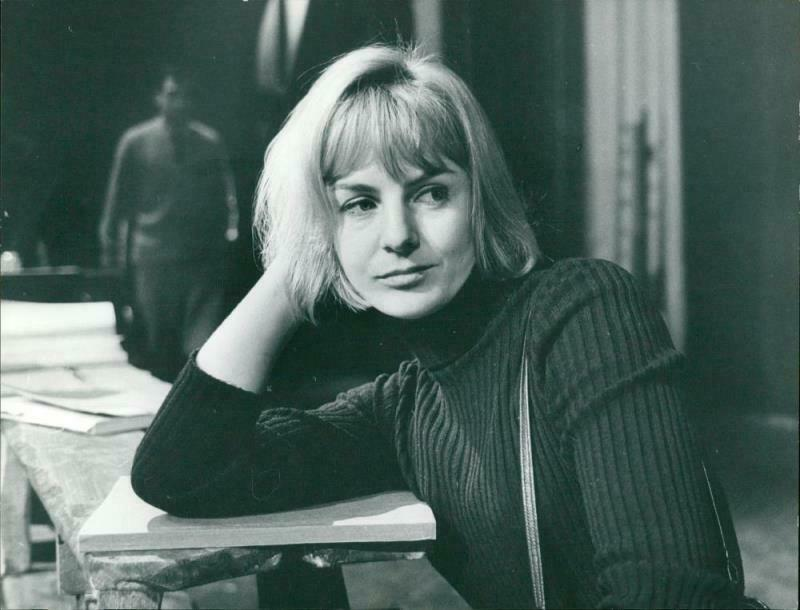
Inga Sarri, 1964

Alma Inga Kristina Sarri (née Jonsson; 7 August 1934 – 14 April 2021) was a Swedish actress. She was the mother of actor Olle Sarri.

== Filmography ==
- 1956 – My Passionate Longing
- 1956 – Sista paret ut
- 1965 – En historia till fredag (TV-series)
- 1971 – Lavforsen – by i Norrland (TV-series)
- 1983 – Mot härliga tider
- 1985 – Det är mänskligt att fela (TV)
- 1986 – Bröderna Mozart
- 1988 – Livsfarlig film
- 1992 – Hassel – Utpressarna (TV)
- 1993 – Roseanna
- 1994 – Min vän Percys magiska gymnastikskor (TV-series)
- 1994 – Svensson Svensson (TV-series)
- 1999 – c/o Segemyhr (TV-series)
- 2001 – Vintergatan 5b (TV-series)
- 2002 – Bella bland kryddor och kriminella (TV-series)
- 2003 – Tillbaka till Vintergatan (TV-series)
- 2008 – Varg
- 2009 – Äntligen midsommar
- 2020 – We Got This (TV-series)

== See also ==
- List of Swedish actors
