= Rancid (film) =

- Swedish cover
- Directed by: Jack Ersgard
- Written by: Jesper Ersgård; Patrik Ersgård; Jack Ersgard
- Produced by: Jack Ersgard; Zoula Pitsiava; Peter Possne; Brad Southwick
- Starring: Matthew Settle; Ola Rapace
- Cinematography: Kjell Lagerroos
- Edited by: Gregers F. Dohn
- Music by: Lars Anderson; Trevor Morris; Mikael Sandgren
- Distributed by: Sonet Film
- Release date: 2004
- Running time: 108 minutes
- Country: Sweden
- Language: English

Rancid is a 2004 English-language Swedish thriller film, written by Jesper Ersgård and directed by Jack Ersgard.

== Plot ==
Once a promising young writer, John barely makes a living doing odd jobs. After a personal tragedy he is now stuck in a negative mood and dispassionate about his work. In the middle of his existential crisis he attends a high school reunion and meets three old friends, acquaintances he's tried to forget but who now appear like scary shadows from his past. Face to face with the love of his life, John tries to right old wrongs and get his life in order. John soon realizes that the past is best laid to rest or it might haunt him for all eternity. Wanted by the police for murder, he must choose between succumbing to his darkest desires or the light that will renew his faith in himself and his future.
