= Marimba Roney =

Swedish journalist and television host

Marimba Roney (born 24 May 1976 in Farstorp, Sweden) is a Swedish journalist and television host. Earlier she wrote about hip hop music and feminism in newspapers, including Aftonbladet. She is best known for her participation in the book Fittstim. Roney is currently news presenter for TV400. She is sister to Nunu and Shanti Roney.
