= No Place Like Home (2008 film) =

No Place Like Home (Swedish: Borta Bra) is a Swedish short film written by Behrang Behdjou, directed by Ulf Friberg and produced by Jesper Bergom-Larsson. The film deals with six young Swedes with roots in various parts of the world, who examine Sweden and their lives there. The film was produced by Saltfilm Sweden with the support of the Swedish television channel SVT and the Swedish Film Institute

Borta Bra won the year's short film prize at the Gothenburg International Film Festival on 1 February 2007.

The citation for the prize said "Sometimes it looks and sounds like a cliché. Sometimes it looks like a film but just as often it feels like you are in a theatre. Sometimes it sounds like prose, but it comes out like poetry. Just when we had thought that everything had been said on this subject, and we already knew it all, they have come along and added a little more. There is a touch of the lonely about it, and a little of the desolate but also a little beautiful. A lot is said between the lines, from an exquisite text carefully played out. The acting is sharp and effective".

Borta Bra is derived from the Swedish saying "Borta bra men hemma bäst" meaning "travel is good but home is best"

== Sources ==
- Article in Swedish
- Article in Swedish
