= Inday Ba =

Swedish-British actress (1972–2005)

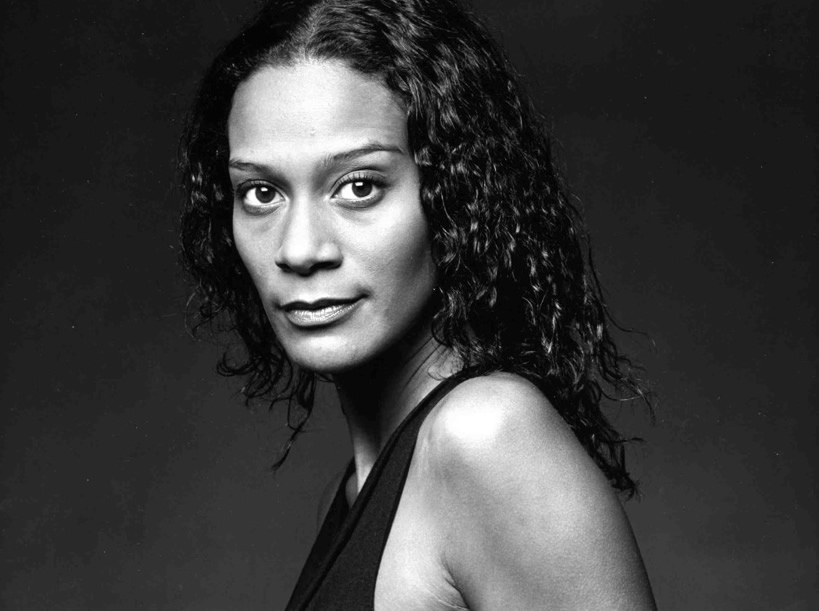
- Born: 10 August 1972; Gothenburg, Sweden
- Died: 26 April 2005 (aged 33)
- Occupation: Actress

Inday Ba (10 August 1972 – 26 April 2005), also known as N'Deaye Ba, was a Swedish-British film, stage, and television actress of Senegalese descent born in Gothenburg, Sweden.

One of her most notable Swedish on-screen roles was as Hillevi in the romantic comedy Klassfesten (2002) opposite Björn Kjellman. She appeared in Trial & Retribution as "DC Lisa West" from 2002 until 2003.

== Life ==
N'Deaye Ba was born on 10 August 1972 in the Angered Neighborhood of Gothenburg, Sweden.

Her mother was from Dalsland and her father was from Senegal.

Her parents divorced when she was just a year old. She stayed in the care of her mother, with whom she developed a close relationship. As she grew, she developed a passion for entertaining others.

When Ba was eight years old, she and her mother moved to Bavaria, Germany for a few years. They eventually moved back to Sweden, where Ba attended compulsory school. After graduating in 1991, Ba moved to London and was accepted into Webber Douglas Academy in 1993. She worked in restaurants and bars to perfect her English.

Her mother joined her in London in 1993.

In 1996, Ba graduated from the Webber Douglas Academy and she landed a role in a sitcom shortly after. In 1998, she moved to Los Angeles in an attempt to set herself up in Hollywood. She was less successful there (she would say that the American dream only happens when you're asleep), and moved back to London in 2000 when her mother was diagnosed with leukaemia.

In 2001, she met Jonathan Clements, a director. They married in 2002, but separated in 2003 (at Ba's own insistence) when she began to experience complications from lupus.

She died from kidney failure and other complications of lupus aged 32, shortly after filming her last role in the ITV drama serial Jericho. Ba, along with her mother, filmed the progression of the disease in the documentary The Wolf Inside.

She was cremated at Mortlake Crematorium and her ashes were scattered off the Swedish coast.

== Filmography ==
- Jericho (2005) Martha Sorin (as N'Deaye Ba)
- Empire (2005) Nila
- Ahead of the Class (2005) Trudy Gower (as N'Deaye Ba)
- Sea of Souls (2005) Anna
- Lie with Me (2005) Ms. Reed (as N'Deaye Ba)
- The Brief (2004) Amena Laing (as N'Deaye Ba)
- Trial & Retribution (2002–2003) Det. Const. Lisa West
- Casualty (2002–2003) Jane Winter (as N'Deaye Baa-Clements)
- The Final Curtain (2002) Caroline Stitch
- Ultimate Force (2002) Flossie
- Klassfesten (2002) Hillevi
- Tom & Thomas (2002) Celia Scofield
- The Monkey King (2001) Elizabeth
- The Discovery of Heaven (2001) Maria
- Thin Ice (2000) Joo
- Four Dogs Playing Poker (2000) Punk Chick
- Arabian Nights (2000) Heart's Delight
- Y2K (1999)
- Beyond Belief: Fact or Fiction (1999) Angela (segment "The Bloody Hand"
- The Pretender (1998) Emma
- Twice Upon a Yesterday (1998) Janice
- Out of Hours (1998) Louise Tiffany
- Ruth Rendell Mysteries (1998) Celeste Seton
- The Perfect Blue (1997) Sunny
- The Man Who Knew Too Little (1997) Des
- Into the Blue (1997) Zohra Labrooy
- Holding the Baby (TV Series)
