= Ola Rapace =

Swedish actor (born 1971)

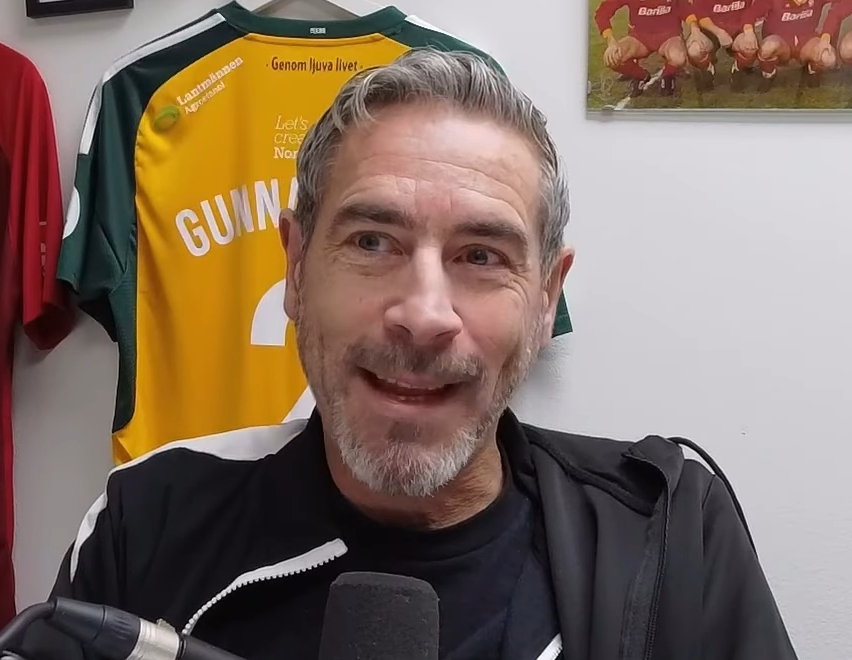
- Rapace in November 2025
- Born: Pär Ola Norell; 3 December 1971 (age 54); Tyresö, Sweden
- Education: University of Montpellier
- Occupation: Actor
- Years active: 1999–present
- Spouses: Noomi Rapace (m. 2001; div. 2011) Sonja Jawo (m. 2019; div. 2021)
- Children: 2

Sonny Ola Rapace Jawo (Swedish: [ˈûːla raˈpasː]; born Pär Ola Norell, 3 December 1971) is a Swedish actor, best known for playing Patrice in the 2012 James Bond film Skyfall.

== Early life ==
Pär Ola Norell was born on 3 December 1971 in Tyresö, a suburb southeast of Stockholm, Sweden. Both of his parents were academics. He grew up mainly in Vallentuna, a middle-class suburb north of Stockholm. When he was one year old, his parents separated, and he was raised by his father. He grew up playing football and listening to heavy metal.

While studying philosophy at the University of Montpellier in France, he discovered acting.

== Career ==
His first screen role was in Lukas Moodysson's film Together, a bittersweet comedy about hippie-socialist values set in a Stockholm commune. The film won several awards at international film festivals, including the Paris Film Festival Special Jury Prize, and Philadelphia Film Festival Jury Award.

Rapace's big breakthrough came with the popular TV series Tusenbröder about a group of handymen who become involved with organised crime. Immediately followed the role as Stefan Lindman in Wallander, which was based on Henning Mankell's Kurt Wallander books.

He continued with several police and crime-related TV series, including portraying Daniel Nordström in the Danish police TV show Anna Pihl, Crimes of Passion, a crime drama set in 1950's rural Sweden, Farang about a Scandinavian ex-convict living in Thailand and Hassel, an updated dark and gritty cop show based on a classic series of books from the '70s and '80s. This was a cop show he also executive produced, and Section Zéro, a French, science-fiction influenced drama.

While he has worked on many cop shows, Rapace has been very critical of the genre. In 2012 he told Cafe Magazine: "All the Wallander and Beck films are worthless. There is no credibility, it does not work to investigate thousands of murders in Ystad year after year. In the end, it becomes a joke, and the quality becomes so low that one has no other option but to shut down the production".

His first English-language film was the 2004 independent movie Rancid starring Matthew Settle (from Band of Brothers and Gossip Girl). A bigger project was the 2012 James Bond film Skyfall, where he portrayed the hitman "Patrice".

Rapace lived in Paris from 2015 to 2020 and has worked on Swedish, French and international projects. In 2016, he starred in the French science fiction film Ares and soon after followed Section Zéro, a French TV-series about a para-military police squad in the near future.

Rapace had a supporting role as Major Gibson in Luc Besson's 2017 French/American big budget comic book/science fiction film Valerian and the City of a Thousand Planets.

In 2018 Rapace was one of the main antagonists in series 3 of the drama The Last Kingdom as Jarl Sigurd Bloodhair.

Rapace joined the cast of Below the Surface (Gidseltagningen), a Danish drama about 15 innocent people held hostage underground in a subway train, as "Yusef" when it returned for a second series in 2019.

Rapace starred alongside Kellan Lutz in Divertimento, an English-language, French thriller that came out in 2020.

In August 2022 director Lukas Moodysson announced the start of a sequel to the movie Together and that the role of Lasse would not be portrayed by Ola Rapace as in the original film. Moodysson explained this was per request from SF Studios.

During September–October 2022, Rapace portrayed Mr. Y in August Strindberg's Pariah at Lövstad Castle Theatre.

== Reality television ==
Rapace was one of the participants in SVT's reality series Maestro, in which Swedish celebrities were taught the basics of conducting a classical orchestra. The series aired in late summer and autumn 2011.

He was one of five Swedish celebrities featured in 2020 edition of the popular TV series Stars at the Castle. In the show, five famous people live together in a castle or manor house for five days. Each day focuses on one person and their career as they eat dinners and they discuss their life and career, and the other celebrities ask questions. A few months before the announcement of Rapace's joining the 2020 season, he had criticized this specific reality television show.

In 2021, Swedish Discovery+ announced he was one of several celebrities, including electropop musician Kleerup, and reality TV stars Jackie Ferm and Håkan Hallin, who would join the unscripted TV-series Treatment, a series about mental illness and addiction problems. Discovery Networks Sweden describes the series as "individually adapted medical and therapeutic treatments, composed and led by addiction doctors and therapists" on an archipelago island.

== Personal life ==
Rapace married actress Noomi Rapace in 2001, divorcing in 2011; they have a son, Lev, who was born in 2003. They jointly chose the surname Rapace after they were married, which means "bird of prey" in French and Italian. Rapace also has a daughter, Line, born in 1999, with the actress Malin Morgan. Rapace lived in France for several years and speaks fluent French.

For years, Ola and Noomi were frequent subjects of Swedish tabloids and gossip magazines while Noomi's international career was taking off. He has had several run-ins with the law, including spending the night in a jail in Austria. In October 2008, he was arrested for possession of cocaine and steroids, which resulted in a fine for a minor drug offence in April 2009.

He moved to Paris in 2015, but returned to Sweden five years later after an audit by French tax authorities which consumed most of his wealth.

In the podcast Helt ärligt med Sebastian Stakset released on April 4, 2020 Rapace explained how, during the filming of French TV-series Section Zéro, he and the series creator Olivier Marchal used cocaine every night after filming, and the TV series ended up being really depressing.

In November 2020, real estate magazine Hem & Hyra reported he was one of several people suing a deceased landlord, and the story revealed how apartment contracts were sold for millions. Rapace had paid 1.7 million SEK in cash to the landlord and was asking for the money back from the deceased landlord's estate.

In May 2019, he married Sonja Jawo in Paris. She is the older sister of Aino Jawo, of Swedish electropop duo Icona Pop. They divorced in the summer of 2021.

In 2020, Rapace published his autobiography Romeo: Min flykt i fem akter.

In 2021, he was arrested by police under suspicion of gross violation of women's rights /sexual misconduct/spousal abuse Prosecutors announced on September 13, 2022 that they were closing the investigation, and the case was dismissed.

He hosted the podcast Sorry, allt gick åt helvete (Sorry, it all went to hell) together radio host and author Fredrik Söderholm. In one episode Rapace explains how he while intoxicated stole a production van from a film shoot so he could drive to his house that apparently was on fire after the producer told him not to use the van.

Rapace and Söderholm parted ways in July 2022. According to Söderholm, Rapace allegedly refused to pay him his share of the podcast income. "We were supposed to get 1.3 million to share," said Söderholm.

== Filmography ==
- Together (2000) – Lasse
- Syndare i sommarsol (2001) – Fredrik
- Hus i helvete (2002) – Pontus
- Rancid (2004) – Bob
- Tusenbröder – Återkomsten (2006) – Hoffa
- Desmond & the Swamp Barbarian Trap (2006) – Elake Wille (voice)
- Allt om min buske (2007) – Nils
- Beyond (2010) – Johan
- Jag saknar dig (2011) – George
- Skyfall (2012) – Patrice
- Mördaren ljuger inte ensam (2013) – Christer
- I Am Yours (2013) – Jesper
- Tommy (2014) – Bobby
- Itsi Bitsi (2014)
- Long Story Short (2015) – Sebastian
- Glada hälsningar från Missångerträsk (2015) – Jocke
- Carole Matthieu (2016) – Revel
- Ares (2016) – Arès
- Valerian and the City of a Thousand Planets (2017) – Major Gibson
- White Trash (2017) – Sami
- The Last Kingdom (2018) – Sigurd Bloodhair
- Divertimento (2020)
