= Anna Erlandsson =

Swedish short film creator, designer, illustrator and animator

- Born: 21 December 1956 (age 69); Bromma, Sweden
- Occupations: Short film creator, designer, illustrator, animator
- Awards: Best short film at Guldbaggegalan for Glenn, the Great Runner

Anna Margareta Erlandsson (born 21 December 1956) is a Swedish short film creator, designer, illustrator and animator. In 2004 she won the award for Best short film at Guldbaggegalan, for the animated movie Glenn, the Great Runner, for which she also received the Public choice award at Goteborg International Film Festival.

== Biography ==
Erlandsson was born in Bromma but moved to Värmland at the age of 16, to study at a ski college. She later came to Vålådalen in Jämtland and decided to live in this area later on. Before the move to Jämtland and Rödön in 1989, Erlandsson lived in Stockholm for a few years.

She studied at a preparatory art school in 1978 and continued with four years at Konstfack (1978–1982), where she also did a further education for designers in 1986. After this Erlandsson took a lot of short courses, among others at Gerlesborgskolan, Ordfront and Härke konstcentrum before she continued with an animation education at Filmpool Jämtland (1998–2000).

Erlandsson has three sons, a husband and lives on a small farm with two dogs, a cat and sheep. She has a lot of interests in addition to her work and includes skiing, running and kayaking.

== Career ==
After Erlandssons four years at Konstfack she started freelancing as an illustrator, exhibition designer and model builder. She has worked for newspapers, museums and municipalities with all kinds of materials such as mosaic and textile and has also done a lot of separate exhibitions. One example of her design is of the hydropower museum in Krångede, Jämtland. Since 1991 Erlandsson has worked as an illustrator and designer for the nature information company Naturriddarna. She is also one animator out of five of the company Tant-I-Loop Film. In 2004 she made Glenn, the Great Runner, a three minutes animation about a man, Glenn, who is running in a competition but who, through the whole race, is being helped and supported by his wife. For this film she won the award for Best short film at Guldbaggegalan and received the Public choice award at Goteborg International Film Festival. Erlandsson has said that she did the film to get the debate going on why teenage girls set aside their own interests in favor for serving their men as fast as they fall in love. This year she also made Sjuk-Huset, a two minutes animation about a day at a hospital. Erlandsson did the vignette to the 29th Goteborg International Film Festival in 2006 and the seven minutes animation Hanspår. This film is about a nature program that discusses the inexplicable behavior of a big group of individuals- the European males. She also did her first non-animated work, I lust och nöd. To the tunes of Verdi a white-dressed bride goes cross country skiing with a long veil behind her. This film stars Anna Erlandsson herself as the main character. Since 2006 Erlandsson is also an honorary member of WIFT, Women in Film and Television. In 2009 Erlandsson did the four minutes, animated short film DORIS as one part out of eight for the feature film Doris the movie. Erlandssons animated short is about Doris, a cleaning woman at the Film institute. On her way to work she finds a document from the Doris manifest, which she reads and reflects up on. This leads to Doris deciding to help out with some problems that needs to be corrected.

The book Svenska mjölkbönders ordlista was published in 2009 and is a wordlist of 145 out of thousands of all the Swedish words that contain the word "ko", all combined with Erlandssons illustrations. Another book that she has been a part of is the educational children's book Min vän Molle from 1995, in which Erlandsson did the illustrations and Curt Lofterud the text. Maya Westlund started working for Erlandsson in 2013.

== Filmography ==
- 2004 – Glenn, the Great Runner
- 2004 – Sjuk-Huset
- 2006 – Hanspår
- 2006 – I lust och nöd
- 2009 – Doris

== Bibliography ==
- 1995 – Min vän Molle
- 2009 – Svenska mjölkbönders ordlista
