= Jacob Ericksson =

Swedish actor (1967–2025)

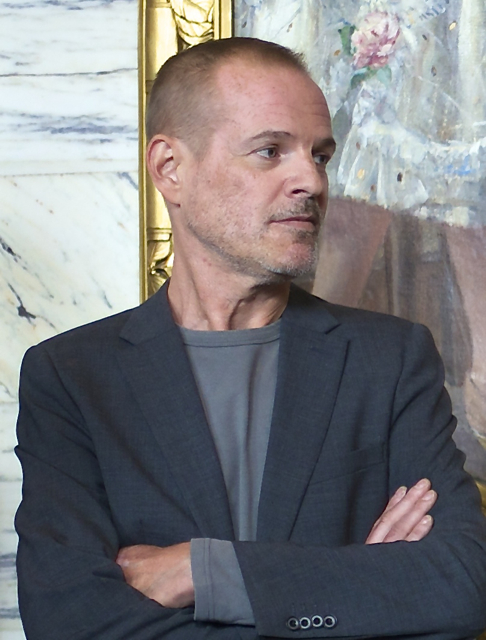
Ericksson in 2014

Jacob Ericksson (born Jacob Abel Joachim Eriksson; 7 January 1967 – 17 October 2025) was a Swedish actor, educated at Gothenburg Theatre Academy. He died from lymphoma in Hägersten, Stockholm on 17 October 2025, at the age of 58.

== Partial filmography ==
- 1994: Rena Rama Rolf (TV Series)
- 1995: En på miljonen – Elias, Cissis fästman
- 1997: Adam & Eva – Åke
- 1997: Glappet (TV Mini-Series) – Mattias at the pizza shop
- 1997: Rika barn leka bäst – The film director
- 1998: Pappas flicka (TV Series) – Stefan Juckert
- 1999: Tsatsiki, morsan och polisen – Polisen, Göran
- 2000: Det blir aldrig som man tänkt sig – Freddie
- 2000: Det okända – Jacob
- 2001: Sprängaren – Pelle Oskarsson
- 2002-2007: Tusenbröder (TV Series) – Tommy
- 2004: Allt och lite till (TV Series) – Jonas
- 2005: Coachen (TV Mini-Series) – Ralf
- 2006: Tusenbröder – Återkomsten – Tommy
- 2006: LasseMajas detektivbyrå (TV Series) – Frank Franksson
- 2007: Iskariot – Valle
- 2008: Patrik, Age 1.5 – Lennart Ljung
- 2008: Höök (TV Series) – Blom
- 2008: Vi hade i alla fall tur med vädret – igen – Peppe
- 2008: LasseMajas detektivbyrå - Kameleontens hämnd – Conny Kameleont
- 2009: De halvt dolda (TV Mini-Series) – Calle
- 2009: The Girl with the Dragon Tattoo – Christer Malm
- 2009: Wallander (TV Series) – Olle
- 2009: The Girl Who Played with Fire – Christer Malm
- 2009: The Girl Who Kicked the Hornets' Nest – Christer Malm
- 2010: Änglavakt – Birger
- 2010: Tusen gånger starkare – Olle – So- & Klasslärare
- 2010: Våra vänners liv (TV Series) – Pontus
- 2013: Crimes of Passion (TV Movie) – Tord
- 2017: All Inclusive – Tommy
- 2019: Swoon – Grey Man
