= Kajsa Ernst =

Swedish actress (born 1962)

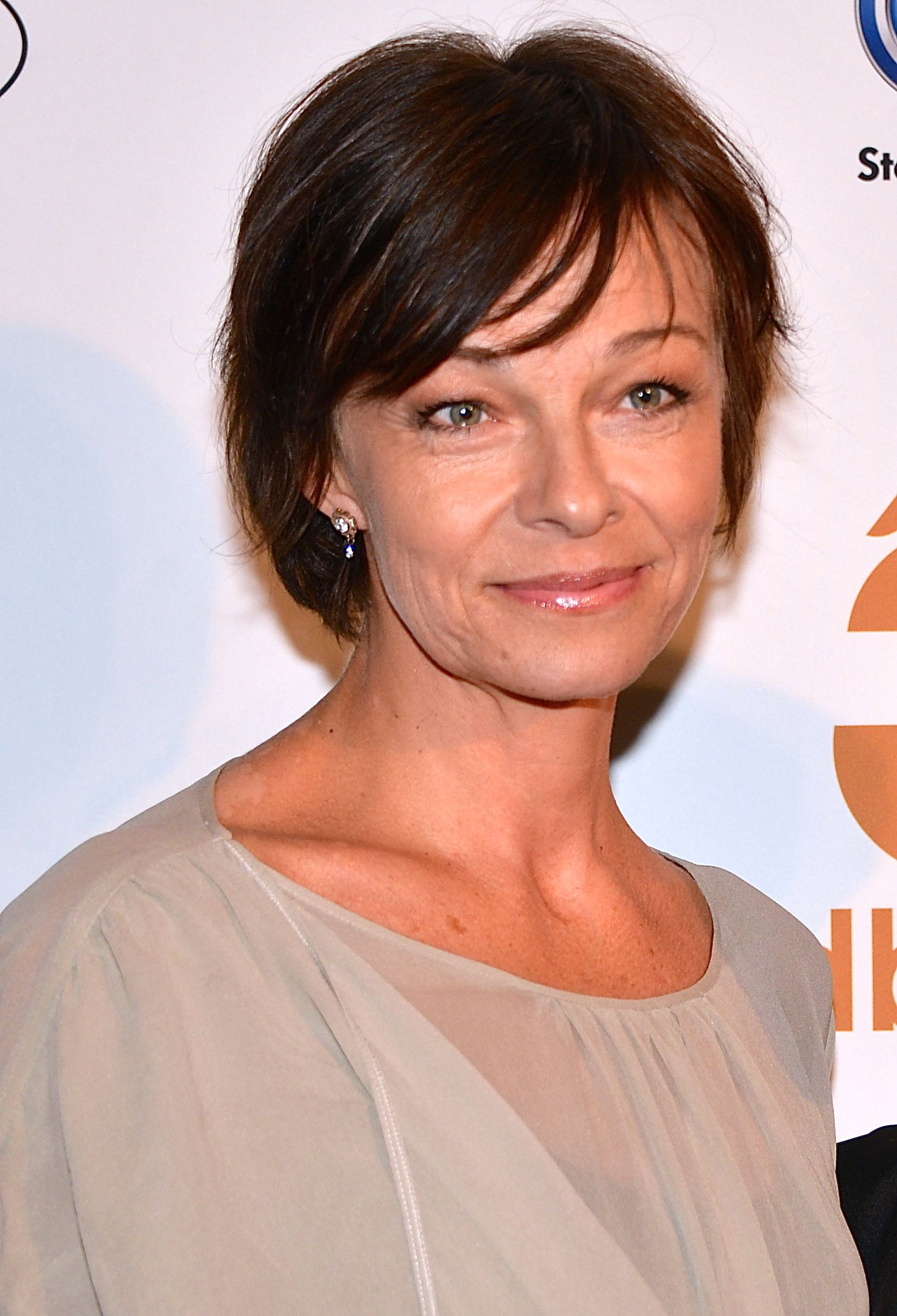
- Ernst in 2013
- Born: Anna-Karin Linnéa Ernst; 4 August 1962 (age 63); Gothenburg, Sweden
- Occupation: Actress
- Years active: 1982–present
- Spouse: Göran Stangertz (m. 2009; died 2012)

Kajsa Anna-Karin Linnéa Ernst (born Anna-Karin Linnéa Ernst, 4 August 1962) is a Swedish actress.

== Early life and education ==
Anna-Karin Linnéa Ernst was born on 4 August 1962 in Kortedala, Gothenburg, Sweden. She started acting at the age of 16 at Nöjesteatern in Malmö and studied at Malmö Theatre Academy.

== Career ==
After graduating, Ernst worked for ten years at the Helsingborg City Theatre. There she acted in several plays such as Byggmästare Solness, Spindelkvinnans kyss, Knäckebröd och hovmästarsås, and The Merchant of Venice.

In 1982, she danced ballet at plays for Nils Poppe at Fredriksdalsteatern, and in 1990 she played a role in the play Två man och en änka at the same theater. She later appeared in the film adaptation of the play in 2013.

In 1998, Ernst moved to Stockholm. In 1999 she made her film debut in In Bed with Santa, directed by Kjell Sundvall. She appeared in Miffo (2003), Dalecarlians (2004), for which she won the Guldbagge Award for Best Actress in a Supporting Role, and also in the film Järnets änglar.

In 2016, Ernst played a lead role as Anna Linder in the comedy series Finaste Familjen (My perfect family) on TV4.

In 2023, she played Kerstin in the TV crime drama series Fallen. In 2024 she played Lena Nymark in season 4 of the TV crime drama series Those Who Kill.

== Personal life ==
Kajsa Ernst was married to actor and director Göran Stangertz from 2009 and until his death in 2012.
