= Falkenberg Farewell =

- Theatrical release poster
- Directed by: Jesper Ganslandt
- Written by: Jesper Ganslandt; Fredrik Wenzel
- Produced by: Anna Anthony
- Cinematography: Fredrik Wenzel
- Edited by: Jesper Ganslandt; Michal Leszczylowski
- Music by: Erik Enocksson
- Distributed by: Sonet Film
- Release dates: 8 September 2006 (Venice Film Festival); 22 September 2006 (Sweden)
- Running time: 91 minutes
- Country: Sweden
- Language: Swedish

Falkenberg Farewell (Swedish: Farväl Falkenberg) is a 2006 Swedish drama film, written and directed by Jesper Ganslandt. It was nominated for four Guldbagge Awards including Best Film as well as being selected as Sweden's submission for the Academy Award for Best Foreign Language Film at the 79th Academy Awards, but it was not nominated.

== Plot ==
The film presents five childhood friends in their twenties who have grown up together in the town Falkenberg. The movie chronicles what they call "their last summer" in the town, faced with the prospect that sooner or later they have to move up to Gothenburg. Their lives in Falkenberg currently circle around nothing and each other: Holger, who seems to be the central figure of the five, faces fears of moving away from his hometown and becoming clichéd; his brother John, grumpy and lazy; Jesper, the only member of the group who already attempted to move away from the town, but ends up coming back nevertheless; Jörgen, who is in the process of setting up a catering business, but without much prospect; and David, the sensitive loner and Holger's best friend, whose diary serves as a narration for the story. The film offers vignettes of the seemingly empty lives of the five: wandering in nature, dealing with the parental expectations, swimming in the sea and burglarizing homes (although more as a pastime activity opposed to a financial source).

At the climax of the movie, David wraps up his diary and mails it off to Holger. He then packs up a shotgun, goes out to the forest and commits suicide. Holger is initially distraught, but eventually, as David predicted in his diary, "life goes on" and the remaining friends settle back into their former routine of killing time and facing their inevitable prospects.

== Cast ==
- John Axel Eriksson as John
- Holger Eriksson as Holger
- David Johnson as David
- Jesper Ganslandt as Jesper
- Jörgen Svensson as Jörgen
- Rolf Sundberg as Jesper's father
- Ulla Jerndin as Holger's and John's mother
- Per-Ola Eriksson as Holger's and John's father
- Helena Svensson as Jörgen's mother

== See also ==
- The Ape, director Jesper Ganslandt's second feature film.
- List of submissions to the 79th Academy Awards for Best Foreign Language Film
- List of Swedish submissions for the Academy Award for Best Foreign Language Film
