= Håkan Hallin =

Swedish television personality

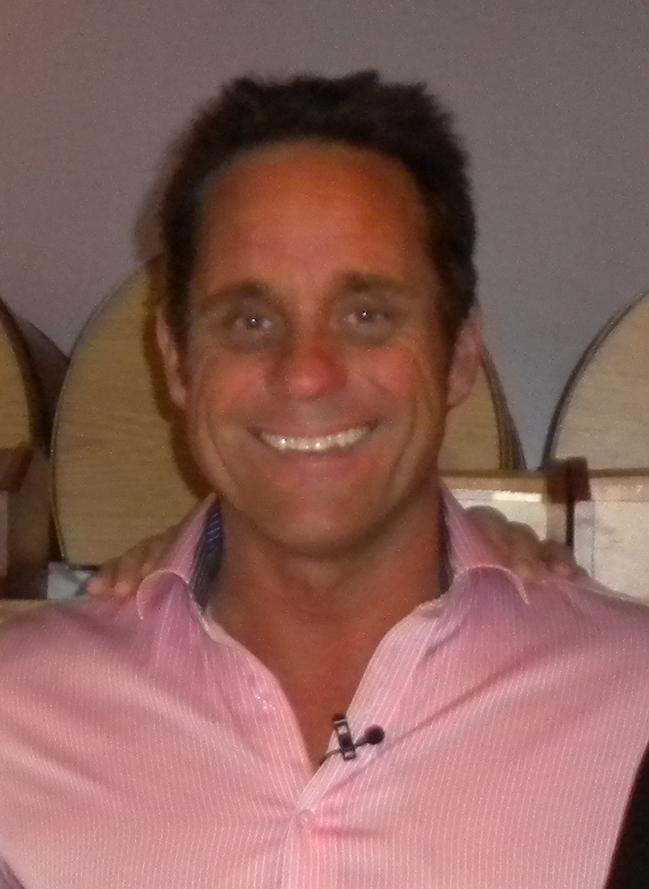
- Hallin in 2012
- Born: Håkan Börje Hallin; 13 November 1968 (age 57); Stockholm, Sweden

Håkan Börje Hallin (born 13 November 1968) is a Swedish television personality and bartender. He is best known for appearing in the reality series Färjan.

== Biography ==
Hallin grew up in Tumba and was an elite swimmer at a young age. He has worked at bars in Greece, and the Canary Islands. Ha has also been a troubadour and stand-up comedian. He is best known for appearing in several reality series, in 2000 he appear in The Bar which was broadcast on TV3. He became known after appearing in the popular show Färjan in 2008 broadcast on Kanal 5. A show featuring Hallin and several others of the crew of a ferry while he was working there. He became known as "Färjan-Håkan" by the newspapers. Kanal 5 gave Hallin his own reality show called Håkans bar which featured Hallin as he left Sweden to start a new bar in Thailand.
