= Comic-Con Paris =

Fan convention in Paris, France

Coordinates: 48.9723°N 2.5165°E

Comic Con Paris
- Status: Active
- Genre: Multi-genre
- Venue: Parc des Expositions (2007-14); Grande halle de la Villette (since 2016)
- Locations: Villepinte, Île-de-France (2007-14); Paris, Île-de-France (since 2016)
- Country: France
- Inaugurated: November 2, 2007; 19 years ago (as Kultima)
- Organizer: SEFA EVENT
- Filing status: Non-profit
- Website: comic-con-paris.com

Comic Con Paris, or previously known as Kultima and Comic-Con', is a French multi-genre entertainment and comic convention held annually in Paris, Île-de-France, France.

From 2007 to 2014, it was held at the Parc des Expositions in Villepinte in the northeastern suburbs of Paris. After a break in 2015, it came back in 2016 and is now held at the Grande halle de la Villette in Paris.

== History ==
The festival was created in 2007 under the name of Kultima. It is a French convention on the imaginary of comics, fantasy, science-fiction movies/TV series etc. It took place for the first time in the exhibition Paris-Nord Villepinte in November 2007. In 2009, the name Kultima was abandoned, the convention then was renamed to Comic-Con on the model of San Diego Comic-Con.

== See also ==
- Fandom
- Comic Art Convention
- Science fiction convention
