= Tusenbröder =

Swedish television series

Tusenbröder is a drama TV-series on Swedish Television in three seasons, from 2002 (season 1), 2003 (season 2) and 2006 (season 3). The third installment of the series first opened on the big screen, March 10, 2006, edited together as one film, before later being shown on TV as a longer series.

== Story ==
=== Season 1 ===
The main character of the Tusenbröder series is Hoffa (Ola Rapace), living a middle class life with his wife and children in a suburb of Stockholm. Hoffa owns a small business with his two best friends, Niklas (Shanti Roney) and Hamid (Danilo Bejarano). But business is slow and they are in debt. First they borrow money from the local mobsters, and when they can't pay them back and realize the danger of the situation they decide to rob a bank.

=== Season 2 ===
Hoffa is now serving time in prison for the bank robberies. He knows that his wife Annelie (Anja Lundqvist) is spending more and more time with the neighbor Patrick (Magnus Krepper), and Hoffa is worried she'll leave him for Patrick. In jail Hoffa befriends Petter (Jakob Eklund), and they developed a plan for how to escape. Once out of jail, Petter becomes mentally unstable without his medication and starts killing people. Petter is eventually taken by the police but he blames all the killings on Hoffa. Hoffa steals a small boat and heads out on the Baltic Sea where the boat sinks in a storm.

=== Season 3 ===
Everyone assumes Hoffa is dead and his wife remarries Patrick. But Hoffa is alive and he floats ashore in Estonia and is taken in by a family there. Hoffa has a relationship with the woman in the family and her husband finds out but forgives Hoffa when he saves his little daughter from drowning. Hoffa decides he wants to go back to Sweden and uses a fake passport, but the police soon find out he has resurfaced. In the meantime, the marriage of Annelie and Patrick is cracking.

== Cast ==
- Ola Rapace as Hoffa
- Anja Lundqvist as Annelie, Hoffa's wife
- Bisse Unger as Max, Hoffa's child
- Danilo Bejarano as Hamid
- Shanti Roney as Niklas
- Jacob Ericksson as Tommy
- Jakob Eklund as Petter
- Magnus Krepper as Patrik
- Ivan Mathias Petersson as Tobias
