= Dalecarlians (film) =

- UK DVD box for Dalecarlians
- Directed by: Maria Blom
- Written by: Maria Blom
- Produced by: Lars Jönsson
- Starring: Sofia Helin; Kajsa Ernst
- Cinematography: Peter Mokrosinski
- Edited by: Petra Ahlin; Michal Leszczylowski
- Music by: Anders Nygårds
- Distributed by: Sonet Film
- Release date: 17 December 2004
- Running time: 98 minutes
- Country: Sweden
- Language: Swedish

Dalecarlians (Swedish: Masjävlar) is a 2004 Swedish comedy drama film starring Sofia Helin. The word "masjävlar" is a derogatory term for Dalecarlians, who are usually known as masar.

== Cast ==
- Sofia Helin as Mia
- Kajsa Ernst as Eivor
- Ann Petrén as Gunilla
- Barbro Enberg as Barbro
- Joakim Lindblad as Jan-Olof
- Inga Ålenius as Anna
- Willie Andréason as Calle
- Lars-Gunnar Aronsson as Ingvar
- Peter Jankert as Tommy
- Maja Andersson as Ida
- Alf Nilsson as Tore
