= Maria Blom =

Swedish film director and screenwriter

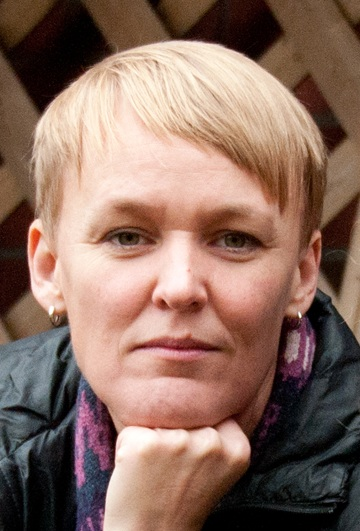
- Maria Blom in 2012
- Born: Maria Margareta Blom; 28 February 1971 (age 55); Täby, Sweden
- Occupations: Film director, dramatist, screenwriter

Maria Margareta Blom (born 28 February 1971) is a Swedish film director, dramatist and screenwriter. She is perhaps best known for the film Dalecarlians from 2004. Blom has written and directed more than ten theatre plays among them Rabarbers, Sårskorpor and Dr. Kokos Kärlekslaboratorium at Stockholm City Theatre and Under hallonbusken at the Royal Dramatic Theatre.

== Filmography ==
- Masjävlar in 2004
- Nina Frisk in 2007
- Fishy in 2008
- Hallåhallå in 2014
- Bamse och häxans dotter in 2016
- Monky in 2017
