= Moni Nilsson-Brännström =

Swedish author (born 1955)

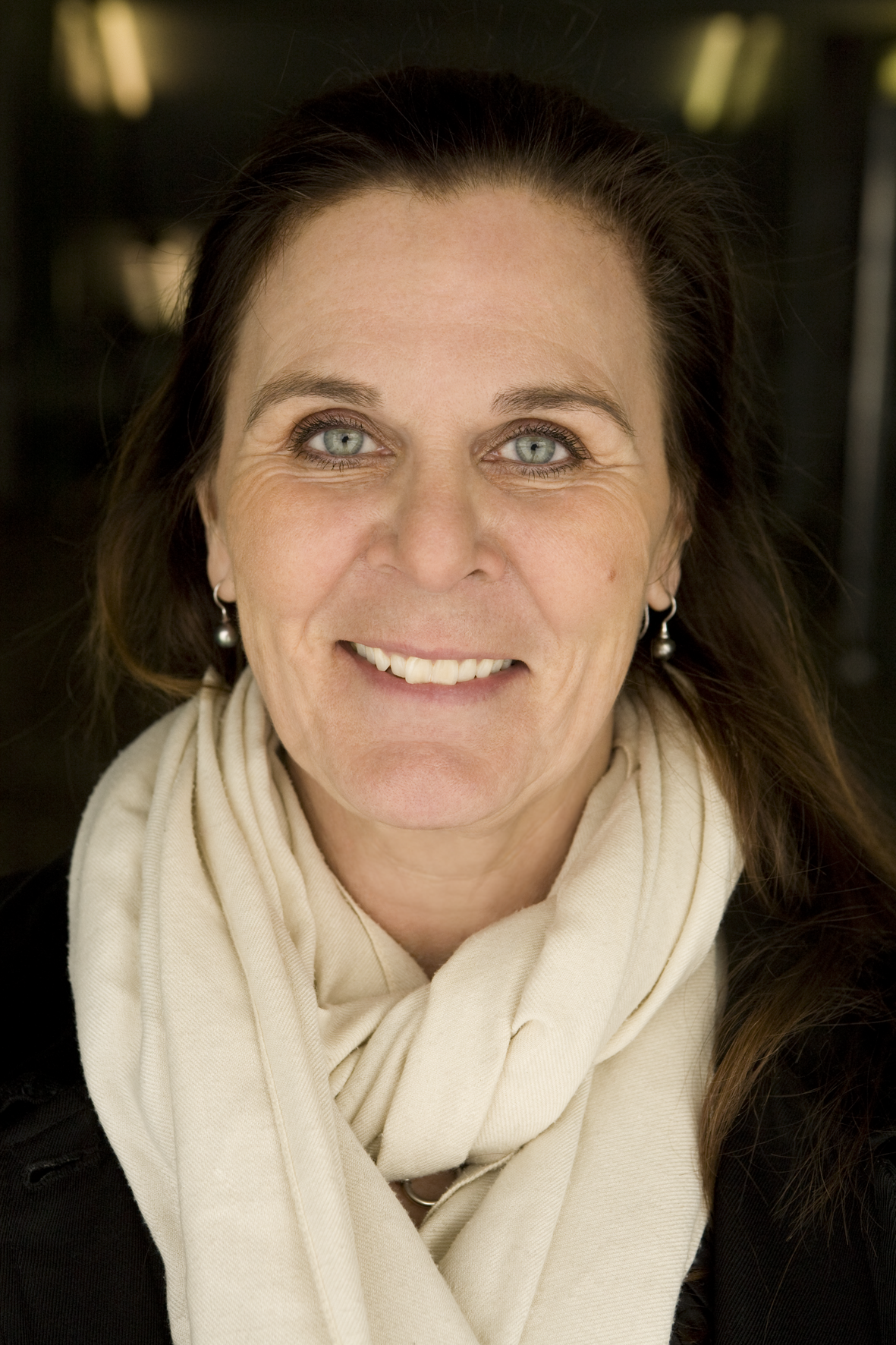
- Moni Nilsson-Brännström in 2010
- Born: 24 February 1955 (age 71); Stockholm, Sweden
- Writing career
- Language: Swedish
- Period: 1977–
- Genre: children and youth
- Notable awards: Nils Holgersson Plaque, BMF Plaque

Moni Helena Nilsson Brännström (born Nilsson 24 February 1955 in Stockholm) is a Swedish author, best known for the books about the boy Tsatsiki. Earlier she owned the 17th chair of the Swedish Academy for Children's Books. She is one of the initiators of the young-adult-culture-house Palatset in Stockholm.

== Selected bibliography ==
- 1977 – Villa 78
- 1983 – Bartolomeus och spöket (illustrator: Pija Lindenbaum)
- 1995 – Tsatsiki och morsan (illustrator: Pija Lindenbaum)
- 1996 – Tsatsiki och farsan (illustrator: Pija Lindenbaum)
- 1997 – Bara Tsatsiki (illustrator: Pija Lindenbaum)
- 1998 – Sejtes skatt (Fantasy book)
- 1998 – Riddarpojken (together with Boel Werner)
- 1999 – Tsatsiki och kärleken (illustrator: Pija Lindenbaum)
- 2001 – Tsatsiki och Retzina (illustrator: Pija Lindenbaum)
- 2001 – Klassresan
- 2002 – Smått och gott med Samuel Svensson (illustrator: Kiran Maini Gerhandsson)
- 2003 – Malin + Rasmus = sant: en fristående fortsättning på Klassresan
- 2005 – Salmiak och Spocke (illustrator:Lisen Adbåge)
- 2006 – Salmiak och Hedda: det femte hålet (illustrator: Lisen Adbåge)
- 2007 – Hoppet: Jumpin' Jack Az

== Selected awards ==
- 1997, 1999, 2001 & 2003 – Bokjuryn
- 1998 – Nils Holgersson Plaque (for the book Bara Tsatsiki)
- 1999 – BMF Plaque (for the book Tsatsiki och kärleken)
- 1999 – Wettergrens barnbokollon
