= Cartoon Sushi =

American animated showcase program (1997–1998)

- Created by: Danny Antonucci; Keith Alcorn
- Developed by: Eric Calderon
- Directed by: Danny Antonucci; Keith Alcorn; Mike de Sève
- Voices of: John A. Davis; Mike DeSeve
- Composers: Keith Alcorn; Patric Caird; Mike de Sève
- Countries of origin: United States; Canada
- No. of episodes: 15 (including pilots and specials)

Production
- Running time: 30 minutes
- Production companies: a.k.a. Cartoon; DNA Productions; MTV Animation

Original release
- Network: MTV (U.S.); Teletoon at Night (Canada)
- Release: October 17, 1997 – June 23, 1998

Cartoon Sushi is an adult-animated showcase program that aired on MTV from 1997 to 1998. It was developed by Eric Calderon and produced by Nick Litwinko, and was the successor to Liquid Television. The title screen opening was illustrated by Ed, Edd n Eddy creator Danny Antonucci. Each episode featured internationally produced cartoons, along with some original material created for the show.

== Animation Weekend ==
=== First pilot ===
1. The Maxx Animation Weekend pilot by Sam Kieth
2. The Adventures of Ricardo (1996) by Corky Quakenbush
3. Buddy
4. A Day in the Life of an Oscillating Fan by Neil Michka
5. Chunk
6. Iddy Biddy Beat Boy (1993) by Mo Willems
7. Men Making Meetings
8. Angry Cabaret by John R. Dilworth
9. Slow Bob in the Lower Dimensions (1991) by Henry Selick

=== Second pilot ===
1. The Maxx Animation Weekend pilot II by Sam Kieth
2. The Adventures of Ricardo (1996) by Corky Quakenbush
3. C'mon C'mon
4. Another Bad Day for Philip Jenkins (1994) by Mo Willems
5. Excuse Me
6. Brickface and Stucco in Last Piece of Chicken
7. The Food Mister by Neil Michka
8. Plastic Surgeon
9. Joe's Apartment (1992) by John Payson
10. B
11. The Brothers Grunt – "To Hell with Bing"
12. Brickface and Stucco in Sizzleans Machine

== Episodes ==
=== First episode ===
Aired October 17, 1997

1. Ultracity 6060 – "No Lip Sync" by Mike de Sève, Dave Hughes, Matt Harrigan
2. Farcus by Gord Coulthart & David Waisglass
3. Robin – "Partying" by Magnus Carlsson
4. The Many Deaths of Norman Spittal – "Balloon Hanging" by Banx
5. Pull My Finger by Jay Hathaway
6. Science Facts! – "Broccoli Has an IQ of 10" by AMPnyc Animation
7. Penguins: A Documentary by Frank Ziegler
8. Cartoon Girl – "My Most Embarrassing Moment" by Heather McAdams & Chris Ligon
9. Howl by Bardel Animation Limited
10. The Many Deaths of Norman Spittal – "Helicopter"
11. Ultracity 6060 – "Farting" by Mike de Sève, Dave Hughes, Matt Harrigan
12. Space War by Christy Karacas, co-creator of Superjail!
13. The Many Deaths of Norman Spittal – "Railroad"
14. Untalkative Bunny pilot by Graham Falk

=== Second episode ===
Aired October 24, 1997

1. Howie Hurls – "Abducted" by Webster Colcord
2. Science Facts! – "Dogs Can Not See Color!"
3. Dirdy Birdy (Part 1) by John R. Dilworth, creator of Courage the Cowardly Dog
4. Voice B Gone by David Wasson, creator of Time Squad
5. Espresso Depresso by David Donar
6. Fluffy by Doug Aberle
7. Stupid for Love by Craig Valde
8. Casting Call by Dominic Carola
9. Science Facts! – "Fish Have No Memory"
10. Robin – "Lonely" by Magnus Carlsson
11. Dirdy Birdy (Part 2)

=== Third episode (Halloween special) ===
Aired October 31, 1997

1. The Sandman by Paul Berry
2. Smile by Scott Alexander Storm
3. Stick Figure Theater – "Mister Alfred Hitchcock" by Robin Steele
4. Oddworld: Abe's Oddysee by Lorne Lanning
5. Mad Doctors of Borneo by Webster Colcord
6. Stick Figure Theater – "Night of the Living Dead" by Robin Steele
7. Season's Greetings by Michael Dougherty

=== Fourth episode ===
Aired November 7, 1997

1. Man's Best Friend by Benjamin Gluck
2. Dreamboy – "Kung Fu" by Christopher Dante Romano
3. The Champ – "Snapper Bob" by Natterjack Animation Company
4. The Many Deaths of Norman Spittal - "Mountain Hermit" by Banx and Bob Godfrey
5. Day of the Monkey by Carlos Ramos
6. The Many Deaths of Norman Spittal – "Mountain Top Balance"
7. Celebrity Deathmatch – "Charles Manson vs. Marilyn Manson" by Eric Fogel
8. Dreamboy – "Hair" by Christopher Dante Romano
9. The Many Deaths of Norman Spittal - "Bed of Nails"
10. Robin – "Sunglasses" by Magnus Carlsson
11. Dreamboy – "Toilet" by Christopher Dante Romano
12. Ultracity 6060 – "Planet Jackson" by Mike de Sève, Dave Hughes, Matt Harrigan

=== Fifth episode ===
Aired November 14, 1997

1. When Animated Animals Attack by Abby Terkuhle and Mike de Sève
2. Robin – "Uncle Harry" by Magnus Carlsson
3. Call Me Fishmael by Steven Dovas
4. Boris the Dog by Cevin Soling
5. 10,000 Feet by DJ Cassel
6. Telekinesis by Dave Mah
7. King Sticko by J.C. Wegman
8. Rip-N-Glide by Happy Trails Animation
9. Ultracity 6060: Fast Driver by Nick Gibbons
10. The Critics by Karl Staven
11. Smoking by Neil Ishimine

=== Sixth episode ===
Aired November 21, 1997

1. Broccoli's Taxicab Confrontations by AMPnyc Animation
2. The Raven by John Fountain
3. Nanna & Lil' Puss Puss – "Common Cents" by Keith Alcorn (DNA Productions)
4. Genre by Don Hertzfeldt
5. Incident at Palm Beach by Karl Staven & Derek Lamb
6. Dogfishing by Joe Byrnes
7. Billy Ray Shyster's House of Discount Special Effects by Paul Kevin Thomason
8. Robin – "The Film Buff" by Magnus Carlsson
9. Death Wears a Plush Jacket by Bob Mendelsohn
10. Opposing Views by John Schnall

=== Seventh episode ===
Aired November 28, 1997

1. Movie Intro by Dan Coulston
2. Killing Heinz by Stefan Eling
3. Gabola the Great by Tim Cheung (Pacific Data Images)
4. Robin – "Shopping" by Magnus Carlsson
5. Where's the Bathroom by Sy Benlolo
6. Love Stinks by Greg Holfeld
7. Open Mic Fright by David Donar
8. Fishbar – "Episode 1: Evil Babies in Colorado" by Honkworm International
9. Sex & Violence by Bill Plympton
  1. "The Animal Lover"
  2. "Doctors Say Carrots Are Good For Eyesight"
10. Celebrity Deathmatch – "Kathie Lee Gifford vs. Howard Stern" by Eric Fogel
11. The Coolest Water Conditioner in the World by Keith Webster

=== Eighth episode ===
Aired December 5, 1997

1. Beat the Meatles by Tim Hatcher and Keith Alcorn (DNA Productions)
2. Science Facts! – "The Mayfly Has a Lifespan of 2 Hours" by Michael Adams, Ted Minoff and Greg Pair
3. Sex & Violence by Bill Plympton
  1. "A Person with Confused Priorities (Skydiver)"
  2. "Husband and Wife"
4. Ultracity 6060 – "Food Court" by Mike de Sève, Dave Hughes, Matt Harrigan
5. Ye Ole Woodshop by Jesse Schmal
6. Great True Moments in Rock & Roll History – "Jim Morrison" by Xeth Feinberg
7. Sea Slugs by Adam Lane
8. Sex & Violence
  1. "The Cheerleader"
  2. "Receding Hairline"
  3. "A Person with Confused Priorities (Driver)"
9. Performance Art Starring Chainsaw Bob by Brandon McKinney
10. Zerox & Mylar by Joel Brinkerhoff
11. Robin – "The Dentist" by Magnus Carlsson
12. Frogg's Trip to the Sun by Keith Webster
13. Sex & Violence
  1. "A Person with Confused Priorities (Sex)"
  2. "Old Proverb: He Who Laughs Last Laughs Best"

=== Ninth episode ===
Aired December 12, 1997

1. Nanna & Lil' Puss Puss – "One Ration Under God" by Keith Alcorn (DNA Productions)
2. Great True Moments in Rock & Roll History by Xeth Feinberg
  1. Guy who needs to urinate invents the Pogo
  2. Monkees fans boo Jimi Hendrix off the stage
3. Sex & Violence by Bill Plympton
  1. "The Lost Key"
  2. "Rollerblading"
  3. "The Beachcomber"
  4. "A Serious Alarm Clock"
  5. "Very Sexy Shoes"
  6. "What Are These People Doing?..."
  7. "After 30 Some Parts of the Body Continue to Grow"
  8. "A Dip in the Pool"
  9. "The New Extreme Sport..."
4. Cartoon Girl – "Nothing I Like Better" by Heather McAdams and Chris Ligon
5. Lily & Jim by Don Hertzfeldt

=== Tenth episode ===
Aired December 19, 1997

1. Ultracity 6060 – "Bleep" written by Ben Gruber
2. Great True Moments in Rock & Roll History - "Elvis Meets Nixon" by Xeth Feinberg
3. Chunks of Life – "Rent" by Mike Mitchell and Chris Cole
4. The Organization by Xeth Feinberg
5. Fishbar – "Episode 2: The Swedish Connection"
6. Love's Rich Bounty by Chris Garrison
7. Cartoon Girl – "You Know You're Broke" by Heather McAdams and Chris Ligon
8. Ultracity 6060 – "Ouch My Eyes" written by Ben Gruber
9. Walking Around by Cesar Cabañas

=== Eleventh episode ===
Aired December 26, 1997

1. Dream Date by Tom Megalis
2. Soda Pop Head by Tom Megalis
3. Pariah the Red Man by Kevin Richards
4. Nanna & Lil' Puss Puss – "Who Calcutta the Cheese" by Keith Alcorn (DNA Productions)
5. A Brief History of Cinema by Tim Cargioli
6. Awkward Stage by Jesse Schmal
7. Burglar Alarm by Tom Megalis
8. Elevator Guy by Tom Megalis

=== Unknown shorts ===
1. Stroid '56 by Happy Trails Animation
2. Cartoon Girl – "If I Was Single"
3. Lou and Costa's Burglar Welcome Mat by Michael C. Schwab
4. The Hippo by Susan Hurd

=== Special: A Special 1/2 Hour with Robin and Ben... ===
1. Drafted
2. The Bums
3. Plastic Surgery
4. Party with a Chair
5. Frogman
6. The Record Company
7. Mooning

by Magnus Carlsson

=== Special: Bill Plympton Shorts ===
1. They Say When You Sneeze Your Heart Stops So What Would Happen If...
2. Elvis
3. After 30 Some Parts of the Body Continue to Grow
4. The Truck
5. The Toilet
6. What Are These People Doing?...
7. The Date
8. Bad Camouflage
9. Husband and Wife
10. The Traffic Light
11. A Dip in the Pool
12. Why We Laugh
13. The Lost Key
