= Da Möb =

- Genre: Comedy
- Created by: Magnus Carlsson
- Voices of: Jamie Kennedy; Gurra G Magnus Uggla; Stephen Fry; Jonas Leksell; Phil LaMarr; Stuart Stone
- Countries of origin: Sweden; France
- Original languages: English; Swedish; French
- No. of seasons: 1
- No. of episodes: 26

Production
- Executive producers: Anthony Bouchier; Peter Gustafsson; Roch Lener
- Producers: Emmanuel Franck; Duncan Backus
- Editor: Magnus Carlsson
- Running time: 22 minutes
- Production companies: Happy Life Animation; Quintus Animation; Millimages

Original release
- Network: ABC Family (USA); Sveriges Television (Sweden)
- Release: 3 November 2001 – 9 March 2002

Related
- The Three Friends and Jerry; Robin

Da Möb is an animated series, created by Magnus Carlsson, about three youths who form a rap band called Da Möb. They go on misadventures to try to get a record deal; however, they are unsuccessful, untalented and they are fighting a losing battle to make it in the music business. The show is known for combining traditional animation with live action backgrounds. It aired in the United States from 2001 to 2002 and in Sweden from 2002 to 2003. The show is a co-production between Happy Life Animation and Millimages.

== Voice actors ==
- Gustave Lund (original) Jamie Kennedy (dubbed) - Cornelius “Rooster” Byron, the leader of Da Möb who acts egotistical. He is a rapper (sometimes a guitarist), and speaks with a stereotypical New York accent (In the English dub).
- Jonas Leksell (original) Stuart Stone (dubbed) - Joseph Tubbs “JT” (KG in the original version), the overweight beatboxer of Da Möb who is very kind, and calms down his friends when they argue. He wears a beanie that covers his one strand of hair, and is seen with a microphone when he beatboxes.
- Magnus Uggla (original) Neil Ross (dubbed) - Tom (Bob in the original version) is a member who has a muscular body. Tom raps like Rooster, and is sometimes a keyboard player. He has blonde hair and blue eyes, and speaks in a soft German accent (In the English dub).
- Gabriella Wegdell (original) Tara Strong (dubbed) - Tara Byron, Rooster's sister who is very bossy. Tom has a crush on her, but she always rejects him.
- Neil Ross - Mr. Byron, Rooster's father
- Stephen Fry - Maurice, Mr Byron's butler
- Dame Lee - Tupac Shakur, he appears to Rooster in visions through his bathroom mirror
- Phil LaMarr - Sir Hamster Booty, a local rapper
- Ken Steele - Clive Shuman, a person of power

== Additional voices ==
- Adam Lawson - Tara Byron's boyfriend
- Iona Morris - Wanda, a reporter
- Amy Lyndon - Additional Voices
- Natasha Slayton - Twins, Additional Voices
- Diane Michelle - Joyce
- Kelli Garner - Melanie Spores
- Kip King - Additional Voices
- James Arnold Taylor - Additional Voices
- Andre Sogliuzzo - Additional Voices
- Glenn Shadix - Additional Voices
- Tamara Phillips - Additional Voices
- Scott Torrence - Additional Voices
- Melanie Deane Moore - Additional Voices
- Samaria Graham - Additional Voices
- Valery Pappas - Additional Voices
- Iggy Pop - Himself
