= Desmond & the Swamp Barbarian Trap =

- Theatrical release poster
- Directed by: Magnus Carlsson
- Written by: Magnus Carlsson
- Produced by: Magnus Carlsson; Maritha Norstedt
- Starring: Sten Ljunggren; Shanti Roney; Rikard Wolff; Anna Blomberg; Ola Rapace; Måns Natanaelsson
- Narrated by: Sten Ljungberg
- Edited by: Fredrik Morheden
- Music by: Anders Larsson
- Release date: 19 November 2006
- Running time: 68 minutes
- Country: Sweden
- Language: Swedish

Desmond & the Swamp Barbarian Trap (Swedish: Desmond & träskpatraskfällan) is a Swedish stop motion-animated feature film that premiered on 19 November 2006.

== Plot ==
The pig Desmond and his friends are haunted by the terrible monster Träskpatraske. Granted, they are not sure he even exists, but who else could have snatched evil Wille's electric guitar, Sebastian Hare's boxing gloves and Bittan Cow's stock of makeup?

== Cast ==
- Sten Ljunggren as Berättare
- Shanti Roney as Desmond Gris
- Rikard Wolff as Helmut Sebaot Älg
- Ola Rapace as Elaka Wille Räv
- Måns Natanaelsson as Sebastian Hare
- Anna Blomberg as Bitta Ko och Fru Krokodil
- Einar Edsta Carlsson as Lille Fant Krokodil
- Rolf Skoglund as Herr Alligator
- Lotta Bromé as Märta Elefant

== Production ==
Animations were made by the Swedish animationstudio Dockhus (Dockhus Animation AB).
