= Moster (motion movie poster) =

Motion movie poster

A Moster, or motion poster, is a high resolution animation of an original film poster authorized by the movie's film studio. The concept was developed and the term coined by GeekNation.com.

A Moster was designed for Hard Candy, and released on GeekNation.com. It was created by Happy Trails Animation's Andy Collen and is designed to tease moviegoers into watching the film. It is based on the movie's poster, featuring Elliot Page's character, Hayley Stark, bouncing on a trap. It was commissioned by Hard Candy's studio, Lionsgate.

Mosters for Jaws, Planet Terror, Hanna, Saw IV and Angels & Demons were released later the same day on the site.

Most Mosters have a resolution of 640 x 426 pixels. However, in some cases it may have a larger resolution of 1920 x 1280. Some of the animated posters also feature Easter eggs specific to the movie.

Mosters also must partly or fully use elements of the original movie poster it is based on and can only take place within the poster, it cannot use live action from the movie, must be under 20 seconds and must end with the same still image of the original poster. They are also designed to give moviegoers a teaser with regards to the movie

Other movies that have used motion movie posters as part of their marketing campaigns include the 2010 remake A Nightmare on Elm Street, Martha Marcy May Marlene, Now You See Me, The Wolverine, the 2013 remake of Carrie, and for the TV series American Horror Story.
