= Desmond's Trashed Apple Tree =

- Directed by: Magnus Carlsson
- Written by: Magnus Carlsson
- Produced by: Magnus Carlsson
- Edited by: Magnus Carlsson
- Release date: 2004
- Running time: 13 minutes
- Country: Sweden
- Language: Swedish

Desmond's Trashed Apple Tree (Swedish: Desmonds trashade äppelträd) is a 2004 Swedish animated short film directed by Magnus Carlsson.

== Cast ==
- Anna Blomberg as Bittan Ko / Fru Krokodil (voice)
- Sten Ljunggren as Narrator
- Måns Nathanaelson as Sebastian Hare (voice)
- Ola Rapace as Wille (voice)
- Shanti Roney as Desmond (voice)
- Rikard Wolff as Helmut Sebaot (voice)
