= TV-Loonland AG =

German entertainment company

TV-Loonland AG Loonland UK Limited
- Logo used from 2000 to 2009
- Formerly: TMO Film GmbH (1989–1997); TMO-Loonland Film GmbH (1997–2000)
- Type: Public
- Industry: Animation; Film; Television
- Genre: Children's animation
- Founded: 1989; 37 years ago
- Founder: Peter Volkle
- Defunct: April 5, 2011; 15 years ago
- Fate: Bankruptcy; assets were acquired by Made 4 Entertainment
- Successor: Studio 100 International
- Headquarters: Unterföhring, Germany
- Divisions: Loonland Merchandising; Loonland Home Entertainment; Loonland Films; Loonland Online
- Subsidiaries: Loonland Animation; RG Prince Films; Salsa Entertainment; Sunbow Entertainment; Telemagination; Metrodome Distribution

TV-Loonland AG was a German branding and management company that specialized in the production of children's programmes. The company's offices were located in Europe (Paris, Munich and London). The company's mascot is a sheep on a blue dome.

== History ==
TMO Film GmbH was founded by Peter Volkle in 1989. The company first began working on animated content within this time, and by 1993 began to produce popular animated content. The company then released its first film - Die Schelme von Schelm, in 1995. In the same year, the company opened up an animation studio in Hungary called Loonland Animation in Hungary which TMO later purchased a stake in. The company then rebranded as TMO-Loonland Film GmbH in 1997. The company later purchased a stake in RG Prince Films in Korea, and increased the number of programmes being produced.

At the start of 2000, the company was rebranded to TV-Loonland AG. In March, the company announced their plans to go public at the end of the month and signed a first-look distribution deal with Sony Wonder to represent their television catalogue for German-speaking and certain CEE regions. The company also began to search for a UK sales agent for a planned expansion to the United Kingdom.

In April 2000 to expand TV-Loonland's distribution operations and the planned opening of its office based in London, the company signed a pan-european co-production deal with AAC Kids, the children's production arm of Toronto-based film & television production/distribution company Alliance Atlantis to handle co-financing, production, distribution and merchandising of upcoming six animated television series and three live-action programming while TV-Loonland AG would handle European distribution rights to AAC Kids' programming such as The Famous Jett Jackson with Alliance Atlantis would handle distribution rights for the rest of the world whilst UK distribution rights to AAC Kids' programming would be handled by the two companies.

In September 2000, TV-Loonland expanded its operations into the United Kingdom and entered the British animation industry with the company announcing that they had purchased London-based British animation studio Telemagination, giving TV Loonland their own British animation production company outside of Germany and taking over Telemagination's production library while John M. Mills, co-founder & chairman and executive producer at Teleimagination had stepped down from his role of chairman while staying as a consultant. Two and a half weeks later in that same month following TV-Loonland's acquisition of London-based British animation studio Teleimagination, the company acquired Latin American distribution company Salsa Distribution, who represented products from The Jim Henson Company in these territories, thus expanding TV Loonland's operations into the Latin America countries outside of Europe with Salsa Distribution being placed as the former's own Latin American distribution subsidiary.

On October 3, 2000 following their initial distribution deal months prior, TV-Loonland announced they had purchased Sony Wonder's television business assets. The deal included full ownership in American animation production studio Sunbow Entertainment, alongside a programming library that included shows based on Hasbro properties giving TV Loonland their own American animation production studio outside of Europe. In exchange for the purchase, Sony Wonder retained North American home video rights to their catalogue and worldwide music rights. Two months later in December 2000 following TV Loonland's acquisition of Sony Wonder's television operations and the latter's animation production studio Sunbow Entertainment, the company purchased a 65% stake in Seoul-based South Korean home video distribution firm Saerom Entertainment expanded their operations outside of Europe, giving TV Loonland their own South Korean home video distribution subsidiary and their entry into the South Korean distribution business.

In April 2001, the company signed a licensing deal with Nox Music where they would represent Loonland's catalogue in all CSS/Russian territories. On May 15, the company shuttered own their Hamburg-based internet subsidiary Family Harbour with TV Loonland considered their future online activities under their division Loonland Online. In November, Loonland purchased a 29.9% stake in UK distributor Metrodome Distribution.

In January 2002, TV-Loonland increased its American production services with TV-Loonland had signed a first-look production deal with AMG Animation & Family Entertainment, the kids & family production arm of American investment alum Artists Management Group, to develop & produce television series marking Loonland's first deal with a management firm. One day later on the 22nd of that year, TV-Loonland renewed its co-production pact with ZDF's production/distribution division ZDF Enterprises with the two would produce upcoming television series beginning with Rudi (later became Rudi & Trudi), adapted from ZDF's long-running live-action television series Siebenstein whilst TV-Loonland's British animation studio Teleimagination would produce & handle animation, TV-Loonland and ZDF Enterprises handling distribution worldwide.

The company expanded to Japan two months later in March by pre-selling home video rights to Little Ghosts to TDK Core while PT-Naina took all non-Japanese Asian rights. In August, Loonland's stake in Metrodome increased to a 54.4% operational controlling stake, with Loonland fully taking control of the distributor.

In January 2003, the Metrodome stake was increased to 75%. In March 2003, they sold their 72.2% interest stake in SRE Corp. (Saerom Entertainment) to Moohandae Media.

In 2004, Loonland filed for a British ATM listing.

In August 2005, Loonland was sued by shareholder group Aktieninvestor.com, after the company deliberately excused them from its AGM in August 2005, following violation of Section 21 of the Securities Trading Act when the latter tried to apply a hostile takeover within Loonland; the lawsuit ended a year later in January 2006 in favour of TV-Loonland. Also in that same month, TV Loonland had appointed Justine Bannister, the former chief of distribution and acquisitions at Dargaud Distribution, the French international distribution arm of French animation production subsidiary Dargaud Marina (now known as Dargaud Media), to lead TV-Loonland's London-based office under the role of head of international distribution and acquisitions.

On September 27, 2005, the company launched a feature-film division called Loonland Pictures, and signed deals with the local branch of 20th Century Fox and NFP Marketing as marketing and distribution partners for the companies' movies, the first of which being Heidi, which would be released theatrically in the country at the end of the year.

In October 2007, TV-Loonland announced they would sell off their then-61.2% stake in Metrodome Distribution.

In May 2008, Romanian company MediaPro purchased 50.1% of Loonland's shares in Metrodome for £3.2 Million, leaving them with 11.6% which MediaPro could purchase out in the future. On May 14, Hasbro acquired the Sunbow programs based on its properties, which are now part of the Hasbro Entertainment library. On May 23, fellow German management company Your Family Entertainment invested a 3% stake in the company.

In March 2009, Loonland signed a new home video deal with Hasbro for Transformers and G.I. Joe, bringing those shows back under the Loonland umbrella. They also acquired distribution rights to My Little Pony: Twinkle Wish Adventure. In December, TV-Loonland announced they would file for bankruptcy protection.

In April 2011, fellow German entertainment company Made 4 Entertainment (M4E) AG through its television division m4e Television had brought TV-Loonland's programming catalogue, with Telescreen beginning to distribute the catalogue internationally. In late-January 2017, Belgian production group Studio 100 via its global distribution division Studio 100 Media (now Studio 100 International) acquired a 68% stake in M4E.

== Programmes ==
=== Original series ===
Title	Year(s)	Network	Notes
Babar	1989–2001	CBC/Family Channel/TVOntario; France 3 (France)	co-production with Nelvana and Kodansha; Animation services for 2001 series
Small Stories	1995–1998	ARD; France 3 & TiJi (France)	as TMO Film co-production with Les Films de l’Arlequin and EVA Entertainment
The Little Lulu Show	1995–1999	CTV/Family Channel; HBO/HBO Family (United States)	Series 3 only under the TMO-Loonland Film name; co-production with Cinar and Golden Books Family Entertainment
Tigerenten Club	1996	Das Erste	as TMO Film "Janosch, Tigerente und Frosch" sequences only
Robin	1996	SVT1; Teletoon (Canada)	as TMO Film co-production with Nelvana and Happy Life
Big Sister, Little Brother	1997	SVT1	Final production under the TMO Film name; co-production with Wegelius TV
Ned's Newt	1997–2000	Teletoon	Known as TMO Film for series 1; First production under the TMO-Loonland Film; co-production with Nelvana and Studio B Productions (series 2)
Lisa	1998	Kika; SVT1	as TMO-Loonland Film co-production with Happy Life
The Three Friends and Jerry	1998–1999	Nickelodeon Germany; Nickelodeon (United Kingdom); SVT1 (Sweden)	Credited under TMO-Loonland Film and Loonland Animation; co-production with HIT Entertainment and Happy Life
The Famous Jett Jackson	1998–2001	Disney Channel	Series 3 only and European distribution; co-production with Alliance Atlantis and Everyone Is JP Kids; Currently distributed by Studio 100 International and WildBrain
Pettson and Findus	2000		
Fat Dog Mendoza	2000–2001	Cartoon Network UK	co-production with Sony Wonder Television and Sunbow Entertainment; Currently owned by Studio 100 International
Redwall	2000–2002		Series 2–3 only, co-production with Nelvana. Also held some European distribution rights)
The Fantastic Flying Journey	2001	CITV	co-production with 2 Sides TV; Currently owned by Studio 100 International
Letters From Felix	2001		Series 1 only, co-production with NDF, Caligari Film GmbH and ZDF. Series 2 produced by Mondo TV
The Cramp Twins	2001–2004	KiKa; Cartoon Network UK & CBBC (United Kingdom)	co-production with Sunbow Entertainment (series 1) and Teleimagination (series 2)
Little Ghosts	2002		co-production with Telemagination
Pongwiffy	2002		co-production with Telemagination
Something Else	2002		co-production with Studio B Productions, excluding Canadian distribution rights
Henry's World	2002–2005		Series 1 only, produced by Alliance Atlantis. Also held European distribution rights. 2003, co-production with Telemagination
Metalheads	2003–2004	ZDF; CBBC (United Kingdom)	co-production with Teleimagination
Dragon's Rock	2004	Super RTL	
Rudi & Trudi	2006–2007	ZDF; Channel 4 (United Kingdom)	co-production with Telemagination and ZDF Enterprises
The Owl	2006–2007		co-production with Studio Hari and France Télévisions
Pat and Stan	2007		
My Life Me	2010–2011		uncredited; produced by CarpeDiem Film & TV

=== Acquired from Sony Wonder/Sunbow Entertainment ===
- G.I. Joe: A Real American Hero (1983)
- The Transformers (1985)
- Super Sunday (1986)
  - Jem and the Holograms (1985)
  - Inhumanoids (1985)
  - Robotix (1985)
  - Bigfoot and the Muscle Machines (1985)
- My Little Pony 'n Friends (1986)
  - The Glo Friends (1986)
  - MoonDreamers (1986)
  - Potato Head Kids (1986)
- Bucky O'Hare and the Toad Wars (1991)
- My Little Pony Tales (1992)
- Conan the Adventurer (1992)
- Conan and the Young Warriors (1994)
- Sgt. Savage and his Screaming Eagles (1994)
- G.I. Joe Extreme (1995)
- Salty's Lighthouse (1997)
- The Crayon Box (1997)
- The Brothers Flub (1999)
- Mega Babies (1999)
- Rainbow Fish (1999)
- Generation O! (2000)

=== Distribution only ===
- ReBoot (1994–2000, Europe, distribution rights acquired in 2001)
- Clifford the Big Red Dog (2000, European TV distribution)
- In a Heartbeat
- Yvon of the Yukon (2001, Europe)
- Connie the Cow (2002, Europe excluding Spain)
- Clifford's Puppy Days (2003, European TV distribution)
- Little Princess (2006)
- Penelope (2007, Europe, Russia, Baltic States, Scandinavia, Israel, the Middle East, and Africa)
- Mister Otter (2009)

== Specials ==
=== Original ===
- The Last Polar Bears (2000, produced by Telemagination)
- Donner (2001, co-produced with Sunbow Entertainment and Rainbow Studios)

=== Acquired from Sony Wonder/Sunbow Entertainment ===
- Thanksgiving in the Land of Oz (1980)
- G.I. Joe: The Revenge of Cobra (1984)
- The GloFriends Save Christmas (1985)
- Transformers: Five Faces of Darkness (1986)
- Transformers: The Return of Optimus Prime (1986)
- Visionaries: Knights of the Magical Light(1987)
- Transformers: The Rebirth (1987)
- Santa's Special Delivery (1999)

== Movies/Direct-to-Video ==
=== Original ===
- The Real Shlemiel (1994, as TMO Film)
- Babar: King of the Elephants (1999, as TMO-Loonland, co-production with Nelvana. Also held German-speaking distribution rights)
- Heidi (2005, co-production with Telemagination and Nelvana. Also held European distribution rights)

=== Acquired from Sony Wonder/Sunbow Entertainment ===
- Alice of Wonderland in Paris (1966; international distribution rights)
- My Little Pony: The Movie (1986)
- The Transformers: The Movie (1986)
- G.I. Joe: The Movie (1987)
- Sony Wonder Enchanted Tales (1994-1999)
- The Beginner's Bible (1994-1990s)
- Famous Fred (1996)
- Lion of Oz (2000)
