= Millimages =

French animation studio in Paris

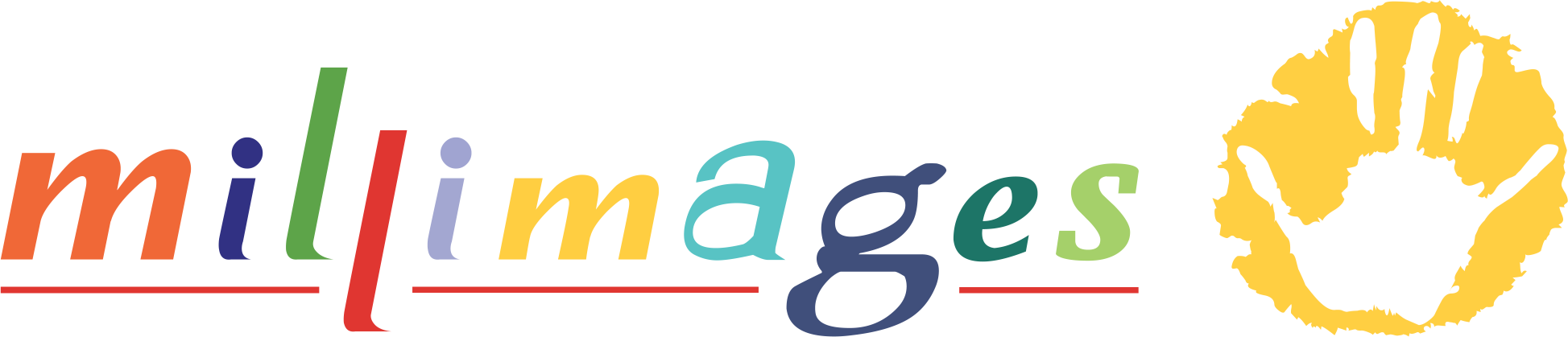
- Logo used since 2015
- Industry: Animation studio
- Founded: 17 September 1991; 33 years ago
- Headquarters: 88, Rue de la Folie-Méricourt, Paris, France
- Key people: Roch Lener (President and Founder)
- Number of employees: 40 (2017)
- Subsidiaries: Amuse Animation, Kingsize
- Website: millimages.com

Millimages is a French independent animation studio based in Paris which develops, produces and distributes family entertainment.

In 2016, Millimages was nominated for an International Emmy Kids Award with its bestseller show Molang.

== History ==
In December 1999, Millimages announced that they've teamed up with Paris-based animation studio Method Films to launch a new stop-motion animation joint-venture studio based in Paris which was originally called Gimmick. The new animation studio will work on Millimages' in-house productions alongside Method Films' works and would work on co-productions as well as outside clients such as TV adverts.

In February 2002, Millimages expanded their operations into Germany with the acquisition of a 51 majority stake in Hamberg-based German animation production studio Toons'n'Tales. The acquisition of 51% majority stake in Toons'n'Tales had given Millimages their own German animation production studio with Toons'n'Tales' president & co-founder Sunita Struck continued leading the German animation studio under Millimages. Later in that same month, Millimages entered the distribution services by establishing their own worldwide distribution arm that would distribute Millimages' programmes internationally alongside third-party properties with former Cinar executive John Reynolds and president of Millimages' American division Millimages USA Dorian Langdon handling Millimages's new distribution division.

In August 2017, Millimages partnered with VOD and streaming service distribution firm Alchimie to launch their own international VOD children's streaming service that would bring all of Millimages' programming catalogue under one service called OkiDoki, marking Millimages' first entry into the VOD streaming market with the new streaming service OkiDoki became available on Samsung Smart TVs.

In October 2018, Millimages's digital animation subsidiary Amuse Studio had launched a Canary Island-based Spanish animation production unit Birdland, the new Canary Island-based production studio would develop new CGI-animated properties such as Shark Academy and would provide 2D animation production services for Millimages' 2D animated series like Molang and Louie & Yoko Build, with Ánima Kitchent's co-founder Rubén Zarauza and its Director of Marketing, Elena Catalán serving as co-presidents of Birdland.

== Productions ==
=== Feature films ===
#	Title	Director(s)	Length	Year	Animation technique
1	Carnivale	Deane Taylor	74 min	1999	2D
2	Duck Ugly	Deane Taylor, Emmanuel Klotz	62 min	2003	2D
3	Piccolo, Saxo & Cie	Marco Villamizar, Eric Guttierez	75 min	2005	3D
4	Renaissance	Christian Volckman	105 min	2006	3D
5	Lascars, Round Da Way	Albert Pereira Lazaro, Emmanuel Klotz	96 min	2008	2D / 3D
6	Jasper, Journey to the end of the World	Eckart Fingberg, Kay Delventhal	86 min	2009	2D / 3D
7	The Sandman and the Lost Sand of Dreams	Sinem Sakaoglu, Jesper Moller, Helmut Fischer	83 min	2010	Live action / stop-motion / 3D
8	Pipi, Pupu & Rosemary: the Mystery of the Stolen Notes	Enzo D'Alò	81 min	2017	2D
9	Lascars 2: Family Business	Laurent Nicolas	96 min	2027	2D

=== TV specials ===
#	Title	Director(s)	Length	Year	Animation technique
1	Father Christmas and the Missing Reindeer	John Doyle	26 min	1998	2D
2	Santa Special Delivery	Jack Stokes	26 min	1999	2D
3	The Enchanted Seed	Eveline Fouché	25 min	2001	2D
4	The Little Reindeer	Dave Unwin	26 min	2004	2D
5	Louie and Santa's Assistant	Frédérick Chaillou	22 min	2011	2D
6	Louie and the Rainbow Fairy	Frédérick Chaillou	22 min	2012	2D
7	Pipi, Pupù & Rosmary, The Magic Flute	Enzo D'Alò	22 min	2013	2D
8	Pipi, Pupù & Rosmary, The Nutcracker	Enzo D'Alò	22 min	2013	2D
9	Pipi, Pupù & Rosmary, Don Pipixote	Enzo D'Alò	22 min	2015	2D
10	Pipi, Pupù & Rosmary, Rabit Civet	Enzo D'Alò	22 min	2015	2D
11	Molang, A Bumpy Vacation	Marie-Caroline Villand	7 min	2018	2D
12	Molang, Beneath the Ocean	Marie-Caroline Villand	7 min	2018	2D
13	Molang, The RV	Marie-Caroline Villand	7 min	2018	2D
14	Molang, The Mummy	Marie-Caroline Villand	7 min	2018	2D
15	Molang, The Magic Wand	Marie-Caroline Villand	7 min	2018	2D
16	Molang, The Ghost's Castle	Marie-Caroline Villand	7 min	2018	2D
17	Molang, The Snowman	Marie-Caroline Villand	7 min	2018	2D
18	Molang, A Beautiful Christmas Tree	Marie-Caroline Villand	7 min	2018	2D
19	Molang, At the Elves' House	Marie-Caroline Villand	7 min	2018	2D

=== TV series ===
#	Title	Years	Network	Notes
1	Caroline & Her Friends	1994–1996	France 2	
2	The Missing R	1998	RTP	co-production with Animanostra
3	Homiez	1998–2007	Canal+	
4	Archibald the Koala	1998–2000	France 3 & Canal J ITV (United Kingdom)	co-production with HIT Entertainment
5	64 Zoo Lane	1999–2013	Canal J/France 5 BBC One/CBeebies Playhouse Disney (United Kingdom) Noggin (United States)	co-production with Zoo Lane Productions
6	Pablo the Little Red Fox	1999–2000	La Cinquième & Disney Channel France; BBC One/BBC Two/CBeebies Nick Jr (United Kingdom); ZDF (Germany)	co-production with ZDF Enterprises, HIT Entertainment, and Red Fox Productions
7	Hilltop Hospital	1999–2003	ITV (CITV)(United Kingdom); Canal J France 3 (France); ZDF (Germany)	Distribution only
8	Simsala Grimm	1999–2000; 2010	France 5 Kika, NDR & ARD (Germany); RTÉ2 (Ireland)	inherited from Hahn Film co-production with Greenlight Media and Magma Films
9	Vampires, Pirates & Aliens	2000–2001	France 3 ITV (United Kingdom)	co-production with France Animation and Cosgrove Hall Films
10	Talis and the Thousand Tasks	2000–2001	France 3 ZDF (Germany)	co-production with ZDF Enterprises and Cine Cartoon
11	Ethelbert the Tiger	2000–2001	France 5 BBC Two (United Kingdom)	co-production with Link Entertainment; Owned by DreamWorks Animation
12	Da Möb	2001–2002	Fox Kids France; Sky One (United Kingdom); ABC Family (United States)	co-production with Happy Life and Quinta Animation
13	Pigeon Boy	2002–2003	France 3	
14	Old Tom	2002	TF1; ABC1 (Australia)	co-production with Yoram Gross-EM.TV and EM.TV & Wavery; Owned by Studio 100
15	The Way Things Work	2002	France 5 ZDF (Germany); TVOntario (Canada)	co-production with Pearson Broadband and Schlessinger Media
16	Fire Quest	2003	France 3	co-production with In Line Films and PRH
17	Watch My Chops!	2003–2016	France 3/Gulli/BBC (UK) Nickelodeon (US/NL/AU)	
18	Jasper the Penguin	2003	France 5 KiKA, Playhouse Disney (United Kingdom)	co-production with Toons 'N' Tales and WDR
19	The Hydronauts	2003–2004	France 5 KiKA (Germany)	co-production with Toons 'N' Tales and Epidem ZOT
20	Lazy Lucy	2004	France 5 KiKA (Germany)	co-production with Toons 'N' Tales and WDR
21	Planet Grabo	2005	France 2	co-production with Method Animation and Amuse Films
22	Louie	2006–2008	France 5	
23	Lola & Virginia	2006–2008	France 3 TV3 (Spain); EITB (Basque Country)	co-production with Icon Animation
24	Rocket Jo	2009	France 3	co-production with 2D3D Animations
25	CJ the DJ	2009–2010	ABC3 (Australia)	co-production with Kapow Pictures and Vision Animation
26	Nuts, Nuts, Nuts	2010	Canal+ Family	
27	Trust Me, I'm a Genie!	2010–2011	Canal+ Family; CBBC (United Kingdom)	co-production with Amuse Films
28	Mouk	2011–2014	France 5 Disney Junior UK (United Kingdom)	co-production with Amuse Films
29	Me & My Robot	2012	France 3 & Canal J EBS (South Korea)	co-production with Syngery Media
30	Molang	2015–2022	Piwi+	co-production with Petit K World and Teidees Audiovisuals
31	Pirata et Capitano	2016–present	France 5 Rai Yoyo (Italy)	co-production with Aliante
32	Louie & Yoko Build	2020	France 5	
33	The Adventures of Nasredin	2020	Gulli	
34	Camp Farmcreek	2026	TBA	

== Awards ==
Program	Award	Year
Molang	Nominated International Emmy Kids Awards	2016
Molang	Winner TVFI Export Award	2018
Pirata & Capitano	Winner Best Children and Youth TV Program Big Digit Awards	2019
Mouk	Nominated Pulcinella Awards Cartoons on the Bay	2012
Mouk	Nominated Annecy International Animated Film Festival	2012
Mouk	Nominated International Gold Panda Awards Sichuan TV Festival	2013
Mouk	Nominated Ottawa International Animation Festival	2013
Mouk	Nominated Mip Junior Licensing Challenge	2011
Mouk	Nominated TVFI Export Award	2012
Mouk	Nominated Rome International Film Festival	
64 Zoo Lane	Winner Best Preschool Animation at American Animation Awards	1999, 2000
