= LuLu the Piggy =

Brand of collectible toy

- Logo
- Type: Character
- Invented by: Cici (茜茜)
- Company: TOYZERO+ (2019–present)
- Country: China
- Official website

LuLu the Piggy (Chinese: 小猪露露) is a featured pig elf art toy character, invented by Chinese designer Cici, from the creator of Cici's Story. LuLu was made popular because of its blind box series, where the specific character is unknown until the box is opened. Toyzeroplus is the company that collaborated with Cici to create the first blind box series of LuLu the Piggy in 2019.

== History ==
LuLu the Piggy is a character created by Cici, an independent handcraft artist who started her career with felted wool art in 2014. Cici is also the founder of Cici's Story, the brand that owns LuLu the Piggy. The character gained popularity as an intellectual property (IP) art toy in 2019, particularly when it was featured in a blind box series by Toyzeroplus.

LuLu the Piggy became a trendy toy since its first introduction at the 2019 Shanghai Toy Show. Its theme is known for "healing" and "companionship" and the toy became trendy for people of all ages.

== Character ==
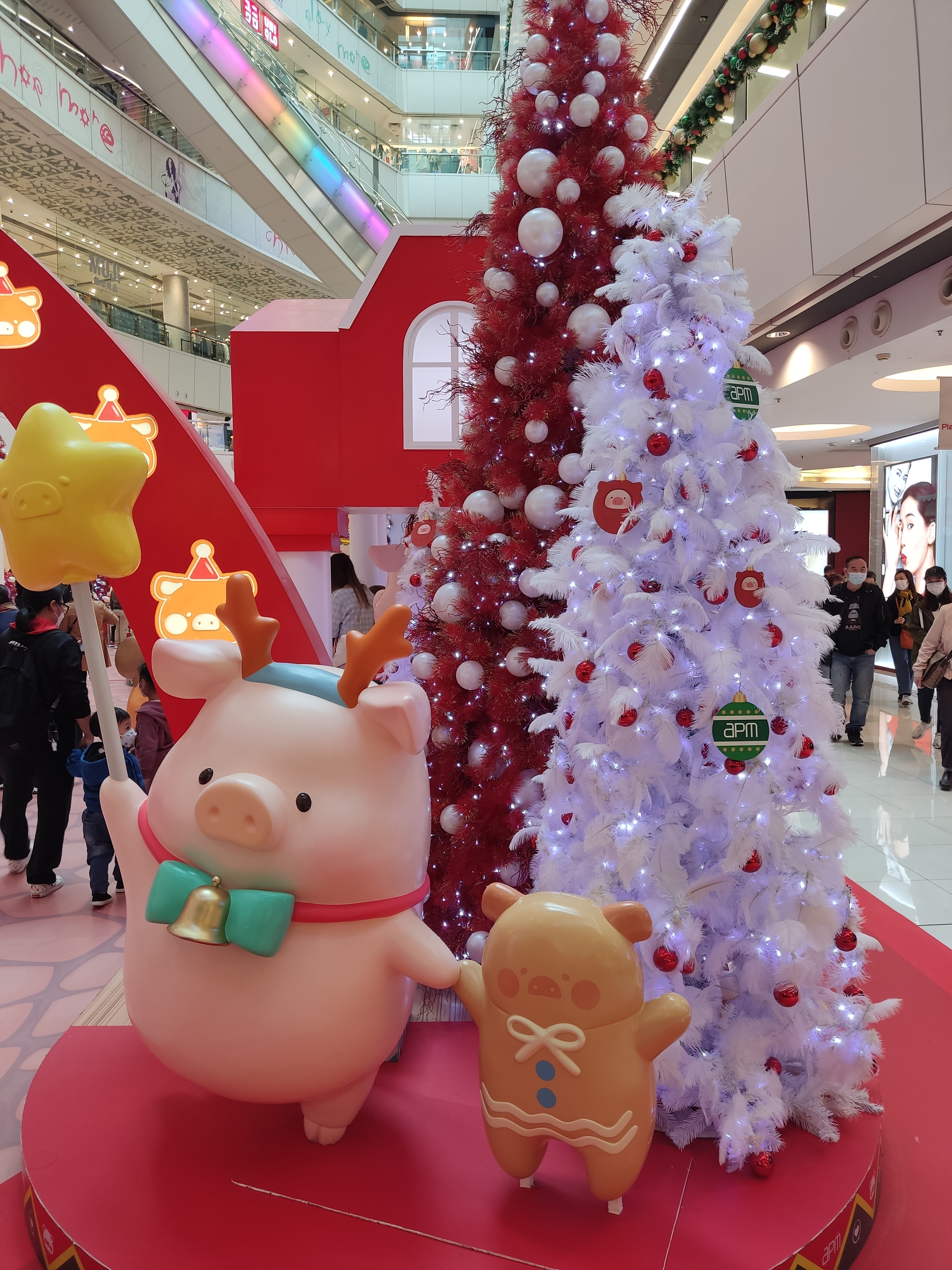
A scale model of LuLu at the left corner with his all-time cat partner MiMi that resembles in the photo as a gingerbread pig.

In a fiction, LuLu is a pig elf with pinky color and a silly gesture who decided to come out from a luncheon can to break from its curiosity around the world.

== Themes and popularity ==
LuLu the Piggy is both a popular and trendy art toy, and one of the most wanted toy characters, especially among collectors from Hong Kong. These fans gave their continuous strong support for the character, which is what makes the toy moreover noted.

In 2020, one of Mong Kok's popular shopping malls, T.O.P. (This is Our Place), had released several installations across its mall that featured LuLu the Piggy in multiple variations with different poses of LuLu to celebrate Valentine's Day. On its roof was a three-metre inflatable LuLu that was a catching eye to the visitors that is overlooking towards the Nathan Road. The mall made LuLu the Piggy as an iconic figure during that period.

In 2024, coinciding with the Chinese zodiac year of the dragon, LuLu the Piggy released a special "Dragon Year" themed figure. This release, along with other "Dragon Year" themed merchandise, likely contributed to the heightened interest during that period.

During the 2024 Summer Olympics, Hong Kong shopping mall, MOSTown, had collaborated with Toyzeroplus, which hosted an event that themed "MOSTown x LuLu the Piggy MOST-OLYMPIGS Summer Adventure". Until 25 August 2024 the mall turned into a sports arena. All kinds of age were free to join the game. Together with LuLu the Piggy's 5th anniversary the hosted mall was offering over 100 exclusive items of LuLu the Piggy products. While the hosted mall's Instagram is launching a special limited edition augmented reality (AR) filters that were available only during weekends and public holidays within the period of the campaign at that time. It features three LuLu the Piggy as a badminton player, a swimmer, and a taekwondo practitioner. Visitors who have uploaded their photos into their personal Instagram Stories with the filter will have a chance to win prizes of an exclusive merchandise or designated merchandise cash coupon at that time.

From July to August 2024, LuLu the Piggy celebrates its 5th anniversary debut in Thailand and it became the country's first pop-up store to launch at the Siam Discovery with its theme "LuLu the Piggy – Stay with you Bangkok". Another pop-up store that was hosting LuLu the Piggy products was in Taichung.

== See also ==
- Hello Kitty
- Line Friends
- Molang
- Labubu
