= Metalheads (TV series) =

British television series

- Created by: Steve Moore
- Written by: Steve Moore; Benjamin Townsend; Michael Ryan; Olly Smith; Ian Carney
- Directed by: Chris Hermans
- Countries of origin: United Kingdom; Germany
- No. of seasons: 1
- No. of episodes: 26

Production
- Producer: Denise Green
- Running time: 12 minutes per episode (approx.)
- Production companies: TV-Loonland AG; Telemagination; ZDF Enterprises

Original release
- Network: CBBC (United Kingdom); ZDF (Germany)
- Release: 1 September 2003 – 2004

Metalheads is a children's cartoon set in the Middle Ages. The show centers around a group of children that attend the Metalhead Academy, a school for trainee knights.

== Characters ==
Main

- Lester
- Lady Liddy
- Schmed
- Bob
- Drucilla

Recurring

- Sir Fuddleby
- Baron Gruff
- Sheriff of Nothingham
- King Trepid
- Friar Tammy
- Dangling Dan
- Harold The Herald
- Earl Stephanie

== Cast ==
- Lester, Bob-Rob Rackstraw
- Schmed-David Holt
- Lady Liddy, Drucilla-Maria Darling
- Unidentified voices-Jon Glover, Sally Grace, Gary Martin, Kate Sachs

== Series 1 (2003–2004) ==
- "An Uncivil Suit"
- "The End of Time"
- "Watch Ye Birdie"
- "Dangling Dan's Day Off"
- "Closed Circuit Tapestry"
- "Olde soldiers Never Die, Alas"
- "Ye Kitchen Maids"
- "Besieged"
- "Send in the King"
- "My Life as a Page"
- "The Stick in the Stone"
- "Ye Sandwich of Destruction"
- "First Impressions"
- "The Not So Magic Kingdom"
- "A Kingdom For a Horse"
- "Last Hun Standing"
- "The King and the Pauper"
- "Metal Dads"
- "Knight of Disillusion"
- "The Schmed With the Golden Wand"
- "The Art of Courtly Love"
- "Sir Lester and the Green Knight"
- "Pygmalihun"
- "Lay on, MacGruff"
- "All or Nothingham"
- "None Shall Pass"

== Production ==
The series was announced in September 2002, when German production/distribution company TV-Loonland under its London-based British animation studio Teleimagination ordered a new animated comedy-adventure series for CBBC and German television network ZDF entitled Metalheads, with Chris Chris Hermans serving as the director for the upcoming series alongside Mike Ryan who would serve as writer for the scripts while TV-Loonland would handle distribution worldwide except Germany.

== Awards and recognition ==
The series was a nominee in the 2004 British Academy Children's Awards for the Animation category.

== Home media ==
A single DVD release of the series containing eight episodes was released in the United Kingdom by Metrodome Distribution in 2004. It also contains several bonus features, including two games, a quiz, character profiles, timelines and a Storyboard sequence.
