= Mouk =

French animated television series

- Genre: Comedy, preschool, educational
- Created by: Marc Boutavant
- Developed by: Millimages
- Directed by: François Narboux
- Voices of: Rachel Williams; Tania Farchy; Lisa Jacobs; Joseph Sheridan
- Country of origin: France
- Original languages: French; English; Polish; Japanese
- No. of seasons: 2
- No. of episodes: 62

Production
- Producers: Roch Lener; Jonothan Peel
- Editor: Alain Lavalle
- Running time: approximately 11 minutes per episode
- Production companies: Millimages; Amuse Films

Original release
- Network: France 5 (France); ABC Kids (Australia); Disney Junior (UK)
- Release: 19 September 2011 – 20 December 2014

Mouk is a French animated television series produced by Millimages, adapted from the work of Marc Boutavant, and directed by François Narboux. 62 episodes were produced. The show has aired in Canada, United Kingdom and South Africa, as well as other countries.

== Synopsis ==
The show is about two bike-riding travelers, Mouk and Chavapa, who have adventures as they travel around the world.

Each episode begins with Mouk and Chavapa chatting via webcam to their friends Popo and Mita back home. The friends say how excited they are to tell Mouk and Chavapa something interesting that has happened to them, but before they can, Mouk interrupts with a story of his travels. The friends usually do not get the chance to tell their story.

== Characters ==
=== Main ===
- Mouk (voiced by Rachel Williams) – The show's namesake, a brown bear who is the series' main protagonist.
- Chavapa (voiced by Tania Farchy) – A grey cat who is Mouk's best friend, and the series' second main protagonist.
- Mita (voiced by Lisa Jacobs) – Popo's Sister and Mouk and Chavapa's friend. correspond with in each episode, through video chats.
- Popo (also voiced by Lisa Jacobs) – Mita's brother and another of Mouk and Chavapa's friends. Popo, who speaks in a British accent, regularly joins the video chats.

=== Recurring ===
- Anosy – A female ring-tailed lemur who lives in Madagascar. She appears in the episodes “Christmas in the Sun”, “Turtle Time", “Chameleon”, and “Baobab Cafe”.
- Abby and Tadi – Two arctic foxes from Canada. They both appear in the episodes "Shooting Star" and "Hockey".
- Bouba – a baboon, who lives in Africa. He appears in the episodes "Good as New" and "The Whistling Language".
- Cassandra – A cat who lives in Crete, Greece. She appears in the episodes "The Bicycle Race", "Little Fish Grow Up", "The (Olive/Village) Festival", and "Pottery", as well as the game based on the show.
- Joropo and Raina – Two ocelots who live in Venezuela. They both appear in the episodes "The Great Crossing" and "Instruments Do Grow on Trees!" as well as the aforementioned game.
- Kalpita – A tiger who lives in India. She appears in the episodes "Holi" and "The Indian Vase".
- Lin(h) Hue – A fox who lives in Vietnam. She appears in the episodes "In the Paddy Fields", "The Bamboo Plantation" and "Puppet Masters".
- Miko – A Japanese Bobtail cat who lives in Tokyo, Japan. She appears in the episodes "Small Is Beautiful" and "Runaway Robot", as well as the game.
- Kanaki – Like Miko, he also lives in Tokyo, Japan. He appears in the episodes "Kabuki" and "Mouk's Birthday".
- Sidney – A koala who lives in Australia. He appears in the episodes "Wallabies' Rock" and "Windmill".

== Cast ==
Characters		Original French voices voice direction by Thomas Guitard Philippe Roullier	English voices voice direction by Matthew Géczy	Polish voices dubbing direction by Joanna Węgrzynowska at TransPerfect Media	Japanese voices
Main	Mouk	Gwenaelle Jegou	Rachel Williams	Agnieszka Mrozińska	Yumi Uchiyama (内山夕実)
Main	Chavapa	Céline Ronté	Tania Farchy	Jakub Mróz	Miki Fukui (福井美樹)
Main	Popo	Catherine Desplaces	Lisa Jacobs	Beata Jankowska-Tzimas	Ikumi Nakagami (中上育実)
Main	Mita	Maryne Bertieaux	Lisa Jacobs	Magdalena Krylik	Iho Matsukubo (松久保いほ)
Secondary	Boys	Geneviève Doang; Bruno Méyère; Catherine Desplaces	Lisa Jacobs; Antony Hickling	Krzysztof Cybiński Jakub Szydłowski Bożena Furczyk Krzysztof Szczerbiński Łukasz Węgrzynowski || align="center" | -	
Secondary	Girls	Geneviève Doang; Maryne Bertieaux	Lisa Jacobs	Justyna Bojczuk Anna Sztejner Brygida Turowska Joanna Pach Beata Wyrąbkiewicz Julia Kołakowska Monika Pikuła Mirosława Krajewska Anna Wodzyńska Joanna Węgrzynowska Bożena Furczyk Katarzyna Łaska Olga Zaręba Natalia Jankiewicz	-
Secondary	Men	Thomas Guitard; Philippe Roullier; Bruno Méyère; Arnaud Arbessier	Joseph Sheridan; Antony Hickling; Saul Jephcott	Jakub Szydłowski Stefan Knothe Andrzej Chudy Paweł Szczesny Janusz Wituch Robert Tondera	-
Secondary	Women	Catherine Desplaces; Céline Ronté	Lisa Jacobs	Brygida Turowska Beata Wyrąbkiewicz Mirosława Krajewska Katarzyna Łaska Hanna Kinder-Kiss Marta Markowicz	-
Title song performer		Rehann Duplessy	Aurélie Guillier	To be specified.	Risa Shimizu (清水理沙)

== Episodes ==
Episode number	Episode title	Country	Storyboarded by	Written by	Summary	Original air date
1	Lucky Charm	Morocco	Jeanne Meister	Muriel Achery and Nathalie Vergès	Mouk and Chavapa are entrusted to bring a lucky charm bracelet to a rider in a dromedary race, but end up lost in the desert.	19 September 2011
2	The Desert Archaeologists	Algeria	Vincent Fouache	Muriel Achery	Mouk and Chavapa are passing through the region of Tassili where they meet Dalila, a young girl whose parents are archaeologists, but Chavapa is afraid. They decide to help the family with the dig.	26 September 2011
3	Urgent Delivery	Crete	Jeanne Meister	Muriel Achery	When Mouk and Chavapa are entrusted to deliver mail, Chavapa’s bike shortens and he gets left behind!	3 October 2011
4	Stone Giants	Canada	Fred Boisseau	Baptiste Heidrich	TBA	10 October 2011
5	The Birthday Present	Japan	Mizuho Zanovello	Nadège Girardot and Marie de Banville	Mouk and Chavapa's birthday gifts for their friends get taken by a mother and baby. So they try the track down the two for the birthday gifts.	17 October 2011
6	A Helping Hand	Senegal	Fred Boisseau	Nadège Girardot and Marie de Banville	TBA	24 October 2011
7	Turtle Time	Madagascar	Vincent Fouache	Gillian Corderoy	Mouk and Chavapa are eager to see the turtles hatching, but must navigate the local fady customs before they are allowed.	31 October 2011
8	Whoops, We Missed the Bus	Peru	Vincent Fouache	Baptiste Heidrich	TBA	7 November 2011
9	The Great Crossing	Venezuela	Jeanne Meister	Baptiste Heidrich	TBA	TBA
10	Small is Beautiful	Japan	Mizuho Zanovello	Keith Brumpton	TBA	TBA
11	The Stick That Walked Away	Venezuela	Fred Boisseau	Charles Hodges	TBA	TBA
12	In the Paddy Fields	Vietnam	Vincent Fouache	Muriel Achery	TBA	TBA
13	Out of Contact	India	Stéphane Beau	Franck Salomé	In Darjeeling, the boys meet Lalila, who takes them to her uncle Ajay to help fix their computer.	TBA
14	Holi	India	Fred Boisseau	Keith Brumpton	A little Indian girl named Kalpita aids the boys in celebrating Holi.	TBA
15	Goal	Brazil	Mizuho Zanovello	Nadège Girardot and Marie de Banville	Paolo and Ronaldo watch soccer with the boys.	TBA
16	In Search of the Yeti	China	Alexis Ducord	Keith Brumpton	TBA	TBA
17	Good as New!	Senegal	Pierre Cerutti	Nadège Girardot and Marie de Banville	Ousman teaches the boys to repair Bouba's bicycle after Mouk breaks it.	TBA
18	Bicycle Race	Crete	Stéphane Beau	Nadège Girardot and Marie de Banville	Cassandra enters a bicycle race and the boys help her dad water the cyclists.	TBA
19	Viva la Pinata!	Mexico	Vincent Fouache	Micha	It is Maya's birthday, and the boys must find a suitable piñata for the occasion.	26 September 2013
20	Pink Dolphin	Venezuela	Fred Boisseau	Baptiste Heidrich	TBA	TBA
21	In Search of the Caribou	Canada	Alexis Ducord	Muriel Achery and Chris Arsonnaud	Boys search for the caribou that got their scarf tangled in his antlers.	TBA
22	Don't Judge a Cactus by Its Prickles	United States	Pierre Cerutti	Gillian Corderoy	TBA	TBA
23	The Best Dressed Elephant	India	Stéphane Beau	Simon Jowett	The boys help the twin tigresses Meena and Mira (who we know very little about which twin is which) look for Sabu the elephant so they can paint him for their grandmother's birthday.	17 February 2013
24	Star Struck	Australia	Vincent Fouache	Keith Brumpton	The boys get lost in the Outback.	24 February 2013
25	Yee Ha Cowboy	Argentina	Fred Boisseau	Baptiste Heidrich	Chaco the cowboy needs help gathering his herd of cattle back to his ranch.	23 February 2014
26	The Indian Vase	India	Gilles Dayez	Keith Brumpton	Kalpita welcomes the boys to stay with her. However, they accidentally break her mother's vase, and set out to find a new one.	3 March 2013
27	Paper Chase	Japan	Stéphane Beau	Nadège Girardot and Marie de Banville	The boys hunt for treasure in a Tokyo park.	10 March 2013
28	Above the Trees	Venezuela	David Encinas	Nadège Girardot and Marie de Banville	The boys traverse the Amazon River with Luis.	17 March 2013
29	Baobab Café	Madagascar	Pierre Cerutti	Gillian Corderoy	Anosy introduces the boys to her uncle and aunt.	24 March 2013
30	The Art of Milking a Yak	China	Fred Boisseau	Chris Parker	In Tibet the boys learn to milk a yak from their friend Pasang.	31 March 2013
31	Yummy, Maple Syrup!	Canada	Vincent Fouache	Muriel Achery and Chris Arsonnaud	The boys learn to harvest maple syrup with their friend Abey.	7 April 2013
32	Nile and Easy	Egypt	Gilles Dayez	Keith Brumpton	The boys visit the Nile river.	TBA
33	Wallabies' Rock	Australia	Stéphane Beau	Nadège Girardot and Marie de Banville	TBA	TBA
34	Nazca	Peru	Fred Boisseau	Nadège Girardot and Marie de Banville	TBA	TBA
35	The Cloud Catcher	Chile	Philippe Leconte	Nadège Girardot and Marie de Banville	TBA	TBA
36	A Message for You	United States	Vincent Fouache	Baptiste Heidrich	TBA	TBA
37	Little Fish Grow Up	Crete	Pierre Cerutti	Nadège Girardot and Marie de Banville	The boys help Cassandra's uncle release infant fish.	TBA
38	Runaway Robot	Japan	Gilles Dayez	Charles Hodges	TBA	TBA
39	Birdsong	China	Philippe Leconte	Baptiste Heidrich	The boys visit Hong Kong.	2 June 2013
40	Dinosaur Trail	United States	Stéphane Beau	Gillian Corderoy	The boys visit Tucson and his mother Sedona in Utah. Tucson's pet lizard Lucy runs away.	TBA
41	The Bamboo Plantation	Vietnam	Fred Boisseau	Muriel Achery and Chris Arsonnaud	Linh Hue plays hide and seek with the boys at her aunt's bamboo plantation.	16 June 2013
42	Hanami	Japan	Vincent Fouache	Jean Regnaud	Chavapa loses his camera to a crow during a celebration of Hanami.	23 June 2013
43	Shooting Stars	Canada	Philippe Leconte	Nadège Girardot and Marie de Banville	Abey and Tadi's picnic is stolen.	30 June 2013
44	Wallabies' Clip	Australia	Stéphane Beau	Muriel Achery and Chris Arsonnaud	"The Wallabies", a musical group consisting of lead singer Alice, guitarists Steve and Juma, and drummer Mike, need the boys' help for their recording session.	16 November 2014
45	Puppet Masters	Vietnam	Gilles Dayez	Chris Parker	Lin Hue puts on a puppet show.	21 July 2013
46	Bossa Nova	Brazil	Philippe Leconte	Sam Wilson	Miguel loses his music sheets.	14 July 2013
47	Rickshaw	India	Fred Boisseau	Micha	Seeking the Taj Mahal, the boys must use a rickshaw to get there after their bikes break down.	6 June 2016
48	Christmas in the Sun	Madagascar	Vincent Fouache	Nadège Girardot and Marie de Banville	TBA	TBA
49	Souq Surprise	Morocco	Stéphane Beau	Lauren Beukes	TBA	TBA
50	Instruments Do Grow on Trees!	Venezuela	Pierre Cerutti	Baptiste Heidrich	Mouk and Chavapa make instruments out of fruit with their Warao friends Raina and Joropo.	24 August 2016 or earlier
51	Aurora Borealis	Finland	Philippe Leconte	Nadège Girardot and Marie de Banville	It is Chavapa's birthday, and the boys are in Lapland (Finland) to witness the aurora borealis with their friends Aki and Aku.	on or before 25 August 2016
52	The Parrot Feather	Venezuela	Stéphane Beau	Jean Regnaud	A busted computer forces the boys to find another means of contacting Popo and Mita.	TBA
53	The Bird Hunt	Borneo	Fred Boisseau	Lauren Beukes	TBA	TBA
54	A Forgetful Day	Japan	Philippe Leconte	Charles Hodges	TBA	TBA
55	Two Wheeled Hero	Canada	Fred Boisseau	Chris Parker	TBA	TBA
56	Windmill	Australia	Philippe Leconte	Sam Wilson	Stranded in the outback, the boys must team up with a grandmother, her granddaughter, and a father and his son to repair a windmill to retrieve water from a well.	TBA
57	Hockey	Canada	Stéphane Beau	Baptiste Heidrich	Abey and Tady return.	TBA
58	Kabuki	Japan	Gilles Dayez	Nadège Girardot and Marie de Banville	The boys are introduced to Kabuki theatre in Tokyo.	8 June 2014
59	Pottery	Crete	Pierre Cerutti	Jean Regnaud	Cassandra needs pudding.	15 June 2014
60	The Olive Festival (aka The Village Festival)	Crete	Philippe Leconte	Muriel Achery, Chris Arsonnaud	Cassandra's xylophone is broken, so she can't sing in the festival.	22 June 2014
61	The Barter	Morocco	Fred Boisseau	Marie Caroline Villand and Florence Le Couëdic	In the Sahara desert, the boys go to a Berbers' camp to barter items.	29 June 2014
62	Whistling Language	Senegal	Stéphane Beau	Muriel Achery and Chris Arsonnaud	The boys reunite with Bouba.	20 December 2014

== Broadcast ==
In Canada, the series airs on TVOKids. In the United States, Ultra Kidz premiered the series in Spanish on 4 September 2017. In Brazil, it is airing by TV Escola and ZooMoo. In the United Kingdom, it airs on Disney Junior. In the United States, it is airing now on Sprout.

Other broadcasters:

- United States: V-me, Sprout
- Russia: Carousel
- Philippines: TV5
- Singapore: Okto on 5
- Spain: Boing
- Australia: ABC2, ABC Kids
- Hungary: M2
- United Kingdom: Tiny Pop
- Greece : ERT 2 (formely) , ERT 3 , ERT Kids

== Games ==
TVOKids has a flash game based on the show where several regions can be explored with an associated character.

- Canada with Ameruk
- Crete with Cassandra
- India with Kalpita
- Japan with Miko
- Venezuela with Raina
