= Molang =

French animated children's television series

- Genre: Animated sitcom Comedy; Adventure
- Based on: Molang characters by Hye-Ji Yoon
- Developed by: Millimages
- Written by: Marie-Caroline Villand
- Directed by: Marie-Caroline Villand; Stéphanie Misiak (season 1); Luca Salgado (seasons 4–6); Thierry Mesnage Boutry (seasons 5–6)
- Voices of: Bruno Guéraçague; Nathalie Stas
- Opening theme: Wellcomino
- Ending theme: La La La (instrumental)
- Composer: Nicholas Varley
- Countries of origin: France; South Korea (seasons 1–2); Spain (season 1)
- Original language: Gibberish 'Molanguese'
- No. of seasons: 6
- No. of episodes: 321

Production
- Executive producers: Roch Lener (France); Jonathan Peel (UK)
- Producers: Roch Lener; Marta Alonso (season 1)
- Running time: 2–3 minutes (seasons 1–3); 4–5 minutes (seasons 4–6); 6–7 minutes (specials)
- Production companies: Millimages; Petit K World (seasons 1–2); Teidees Audiovisuals (season 1)

Original release
- Network: Piwi+ Canal+ Family; TF1; Televisió de Catalunya (Spain; season 1)
- Release: November 2, 2015 – 2022

Molang is a French animated preschool television series created by the animation studio Millimages. The titular character, Molang, was designed by the Korean illustrator Hye-Ji Yoon on the platform KakaoTalk. The show's animation and art style are heavily inspired by the Japanese chibi style.

== Plot ==
The series chronicles the relationship between roommates and best friends, Molang, an enthusiastic, happy and optimistic rabbit, and Piu Piu, a timid and introverted chick. Their adventures and occasional misadventures usually cause them to pit their wits against the minutiae of their world, ranging from everyday problems and sitcom-style situations to bigger adventures that often turn dangerous and/or risky.

== Characters ==
- Molang (voiced by Bruno Guéraçague) – A white rabbit who makes every moment of the duo's daily life a unique and wonderful moment, taking special care of each detail, and giving little things an unexpected fresh taste. Molang puts its heart into everything it does, even when it gets it and its friend, Piu Piu, into trouble.
- Piu Piu (voiced by Nathalie Stas) – A little yellow chick who is shy, reserved, and someone who dislikes being the center of attention. It takes great care to keep things under control, and whenever something unexpected arises, Piu Piu can be quickly destabilized.
- The Pincos (voiced by unknown actor) – Molang and Piu Piu's friends, a group of miscellaneous rabbits that look identical in shape to their counterpart, Molang. They vary greatly in personality; some are friendly and well-meaning (like Molang), while others are soft-spoken and timid (like Piu Piu), and others are easily irritated and short-tempered (the beachgoers from "The Coconut", the director from "The Extras", etc.)

== Episodes ==
Season	Episodes	Originally released
1	52	2016
2	52	2017
3	52	2018
Specials	9	2019
4	52	2020
5	52	2021
6	52	2022

=== Season 1 (2015) ===
No. overall	No. in season	Title	Screenplay by	Storyboarded by	Original release date
1	1	"The Party"	Marie-Caroline Villand	Stéphanie Misiak	November 2, 2015
Molang and Piu Piu dress up for the party.
2	2	"The Bicycle Ride"	Balthazar Chapuis & Marie-Caroline Villand	Frédéric Dybowski	TBA
Piu Piu tries to keep up with the others on a bike ride.
3	3	"The Castaways"	Balthazar Chapuis & Marie-Caroline Villand	Cécile Lavocat	TBA
After a shipwreck, Molang and Piu Piu are stranded.
4	4	"The Camel"	Pierre Olivier	Vincent Guérin	TBA
Molang and Piu Piu find creative ways to ride a tall and "stubborn" camel.
5	5	"The Coconut"	Florence Marchal & Marie-Caroline Villand	Stéphane Beau	TBA
Molang and Piu Piu try to open a coconut but end up disturbing the others.
6	6	"The Suitcase"	Pierre Olivier	Cécile Lavocat	TBA
Molang and Piu Piu pack up for an airplane ride to the beach.
7	7	"The Christmas Tree"	Florence Marchal & Marie-Caroline Villand	Matthieu Cordier	TBA
Molang catches a cold while he and Piu Piu are trying to get a new christmas tree after the last one burned.
8	8	"The Goldfish"	Florence Marchal & Marie-Caroline Villand	Stéphane Beau & Matthieu Cordier	TBA
Molang and Piu Piu try to cheer up a lonely goldfish and have no choice but to release it into the water.
9	9	"The Beach"	Florence Marchal & Marie-Caroline Villand	Julien Cayot	TBA
Molang and Piu Piu try to find a perfect beach spot, but the shark (later revealed to be Molang's hat) is in for a treat.
10	10	"The Fishing Trip"	Balthazar Chapuis & Marie-Caroline Villand	Stéphane Beau	TBA
Molang and Piu Piu try to catch fish, but they end up in a water ski ride.
11	11	"The Campers"	Pierre Olivier	Cécile Lavocat	TBA
Molang tries to find a perfect camping spot, but ends up having setbacks.
12	12	"The Television"	Pierre Olivier	Frédéric Dybowski	TBA
Molang and Piu Piu set up a new television, but it's on the Fritz (broken).
13	13	"The Sleepless Night"	Marie-Caroline Villand	Vincent Guérin	TBA
Molang puts "a hardworking yet tiring" Piu Piu to sleep with a lullaby.
14	14	"The Second Hand Market"	Marie-Caroline Villand	Matthieu Cordier	TBA
Molang and Piu Piu organize their own market.
15	15	"The Parcel"	Balthazar Chapuis & Marie-Caroline Villand	Matthieu Cordier	TBA
Molang and Piu Piu find creative ways to get out of the snow and get a parcel, but it is revealed that the parcel belongs to a smart Pinco.
16	16	"The Butterfly"	Florence Marchal & Marie-Caroline Villand	Vincent Guérin	TBA
Catching a butterfly is no picnic...
17	17	"The Surprise"	Pierre Olivier	Matthieu Cordier	TBA
Molang wants to know what the surprise by Piu Piu is!
18	18	"The Forest"	Florence Marchal & Marie-Caroline Villand	Vincent Guérin	TBA
Molang and Piu Piu get lost in the forest while picking mushrooms.
19	19	"The Pumpkin"	Florence Marchal & Marie-Caroline Villand	Jean-Sébastien Vernerie	TBA
The pumpkin gets mistaken for a mummy Pinco.
20	20	"The Armchair"	Balthazar Chapuis & Marie-Caroline Villand	Jean-Sébastien Vernerie	TBA
Molang and Piu Piu search for a new chair.
21	21	"The Stage Fright"	Eddy Fluchon & Christophe Patris	Nadia Brahimi	TBA
Piu Piu gets stage fright in front of the audience.
22	22	"The Cowboys"	Balthazar Chapuis & Marie-Caroline Villand	Matthieu Cordier	TBA
Molang and Piu Piu wrangle up some cows and sheep.
23	23	"The Bandana"	Balthazar Chapuis & Marie-Caroline Villand	Jean-Sébastien Vernerie	TBA
Molang and his friends track down Piu Piu's bandana.
24	24	"The Penguin"	Florence Marchal & Marie-Caroline Villand	Ahmed Guerrouache	TBA
Piu Piu gets mistaken for a baby penguin.
25	25	"The Car"	Pierre Olivier	Nadia Brahimi	TBA
Piu Piu worries about his car getting dirty.
26	26	"The Hiccup"	Pierre Olivier	Ahmed Guerrouache	TBA
Piu Piu's hiccups get the better of Molang and his friends.
27	27	"The Mountain Bloom"	Balthazar Chapuis & Marie-Caroline Villand	Julien Cayot	TBA
Molang and Piu Piu search for the last flower in the mountains.
28	28	"A Restless Night"	Marie-Caroline Villand	Matthieu Cordier	TBA
There is a burglar in the house.
29	29	"The Archaeologists"	Florence Marchal & Marie-Caroline Villand	Matthieu Cordier	TBA
Molang and Piu Piu search for the bones of an elephant specimen.
30	30	"The Hockey Game"	Florence Marchal & Marie-Caroline Villand	Julien Cayot	TBA
Molang and Piu Piu play hockey with the other players.
31	31	"The Castle"	Florence Marchal & Marie-Caroline Villand	Nadia Brahimi	TBA
Molang and Piu Piu (and 2 scared pincos) spend their night in a haunted castle after their tent covers get blown on the top of the castle by a storm.
32	32	"The Shepherds"	Florence Marchal & Marie-Caroline Villand	Matthieu Cordier	TBA
Molang and Piu Piu may not be good at sheep care, but they are good at one thing: making clothes out of yarn.
33	33	"The Puppy"	Balthazar Chapuis & Marie-Caroline Villand	David Lopez	TBA
Molang and Piu Piu take care of the puppy until it is found by an owner.
34	34	"The Underground Walk"	Pierre Olivier	Julien Cayot	TBA
Molang and Piu Piu want to have fun in the cave, but their group leader refuses.
35	35	"The Hotel"	Florence Marchal & Marie-Caroline Villand	Matthieu Cordier	TBA
Molang and Piu Piu try to take care of the hotel but have their work cut out for them when a critic arrives.
36	36	"The Explorers"	Florence Marchal & Marie-Caroline Villand	Julien Cayot	TBA
Molang and Piu Piu search for the lost treasure; later revealed to be peanuts.
37	37	"The Football Player"	Pierre Olivier	Julien Cayot	TBA
Molang and Piu Piu just want to take a picture of the last football player.
38	38	"The Robot"	Jean de Loriol	Nadia Brahimi	TBA
Molang and Piu Piu have a robot who can do chores.
39	39	"A Friendly Rugby Game"	Balthazar Chapuis & Marie-Caroline Villand	Matthieu Cordier	TBA
Molang and Piu Piu are isolated to play in separate teams.
40	40	"The Firemen"	Florence Marchal & Marie-Caroline Villand	David Lopez	TBA
Molang and Piu Piu get mistaken for real firefighters.
41	41	"The Keys"	Balthazar Chapuis & Marie-Caroline Villand	David Lopez	TBA
Molang and Piu Piu search for the lost keys in the beach, but the keys are revealed to be in their car the whole time.
42	42	"The Lighthouse"	Florence Marchal & Marie-Caroline Villand	Ahmed Guerrouache	TBA
Molang and Piu Piu spend their day in the lighthouse after getting distracted by construction.
43	43	"The Stork"	Pierre Olivier	Nadia Brahimi	TBA
After washing the roof a stork wants to make a nest, but the roof is too slippery
44	44	"The Statue"	Pierre Olivier	Julien Cayot	TBA
Piu Piu's statue is broken.
45	45	"The Movie"	Balthazar Chapuis & Marie-Caroline Villand	Matthieu Cordier	TBA
The cowboy movie are ruined by Molang and Piu Piu.
46	46	"The Rescuers"	Florence Marchal & Marie-Caroline Villand	Ahmed Guerrouache	TBA
Molang and Piu Piu make good beach rescuers.
47	47	"Traffic Jam"	Balthazar Chapuis & Marie-Caroline Villand	Nadia Brahimi	TBA
Molang and Piu Piu have fun in the middle of a traffic jam which is caused by 2 pincos fighting.
48	48	"The Baby Seal"	Florence Marchal & Marie-Caroline Villand	David Lopez	TBA
Molang and Piu Piu have to bring the baby seal to its mother.
49	49	"The Guest"	Sarah Mallet	Matthieu Cordier	TBA
The guest of Molang and Piu Piu is... a clown?
50	50	"An Extraordinary Catch"	Florence Marchal & Marie-Caroline Villand	Matthieu Cordier	TBA
Molang and Piu Piu want to catch an extraordinary fish, but their friends do not care.
51	51	"Skiing"	Sonia Gozlan	Matthieu Cordier	TBA
Molang and Piu Piu go out skiing until setbacks arise.
52	52	"Superstars"	Balthazar Chapuis & Marie-Caroline Villand	David Lopez	TBA
Molang and Piu Piu become superstars, but they miss their quiet life.

=== Season 2 (2016) ===
No. overall	No. in season	Title	Screenplay by	Storyboarded by	Original release date
53	1	"The Side-Car"	Eddy Fluchon & Marie-Caroline Villand	Stéphane Cronier	TBA
Molang and Piu Piu's friend's puzzle piece... is missing!
54	2	"The Present"	Jérôme Erbin & Philippe Naas	Stéphanie Misiak	TBA
Molang and Piu Piu are on a mission to give a present to a faraway friend.
55	3	"Chickenpox"	Eddy Fluchon & Marie-Caroline Villand	Khodom Outhaithavy	TBA
Molang is forbidden to contact Piu Piu, who has contracted chickenpox.
56	4	"The Competition (1)"	Eddy Fluchon & Marie-Caroline Villand	Stéphanie Misiak	TBA
Molang and Piu Piu find a way to get their big watermelon to the event. Note: This is the first of two episodes that share the same title.
57	5	"MC Molang"	Pierre Olivier	Olivier Som	TBA
Molang and Piu Piu make music out of an old record, and their music helps the chickens lay eggs.
58	6	"The Aquarium"	Florence Marchal & Marie-Caroline Villand	Stéphane Cronier	TBA
Molang and Piu Piu want to help an aquarium owner, but nothing goes according to plan.
59	7	"The Highland Games"	Florence Marchal & Marie-Caroline Villand	Sophia Daly	TBA
Molang, Piu Piu and the Scottish competitors learn their strengths.
60	8	"Ting Tong"	Florence Marchal & Marie-Caroline Villand	Khodom Outhaithavy	TBA
The gorilla does not dare to leave Piu Piu.
61	9	"The Sled"	Florence Marchal & Marie-Caroline Villand	Sophia Daly	TBA
Molang and Piu Piu make friends with a gamer who prefers to play video snow games.
62	10	"The Piano"	Balthazar Chapuis & Marie-Caroline Villand	Olivier Som	TBA
Molang and Piu Piu bring a new piano to the concert after the old one got broken.
63	11	"Safari"	Florence Marchal & Marie-Caroline Villand	Stéphane Cronier	TBA
Molang and Piu Piu's car breaks down during a safari ride, and others work together to find their friends.
64	12	"The Jungle"	Balthazar Chapuis & Marie-Caroline Villand	Khodom Outhaithavy	TBA
During a trip to the jungle, Molang and Piu Piu explore and comfort each other.
65	13	"The Rodeo"	Eddy Fluchon & Marie-Caroline Villand	Stéphane Cronier	TBA
Piu Piu tries to do cowboy skills.
66	14	"At the Circus"	Matthieu Cordier & Marie-Caroline Villand	Khodom Outhaithavy	TBA
Molang gets mistaken for a clown!
67	15	"Cupcake"	Jérôme Erbin	Christine Jie-Eun Shin	TBA
Molang and Piu Piu spread the word for delicious cupcakes, but too many bunnies overwhelm the service.
68	16	"The Food Truck"	Balthazar Chapuis & Marie-Caroline Villand	Sophia Daly	TBA
Molang and Piu Piu set up a food truck, and they've got a canine problem on their hands!
69	17	"Unlucky"	Jérôme Erbin	Kathleen Ponsard	TBA
Molang and Piu Piu want to throw a costume party, but nothing goes according to plan.
70	18	"A Gust of Wind"	Eddy Fluchon & Christophe Patris	Christophe Le Borgne	TBA
Molang and Piu Piu want to play toys with their friends, but the wind has other ideas.
71	19	"The Climbing Rope"	Balthazar Chapuis & Marie-Caroline Villand	Sophia Daly	TBA
Molang and Piu Piu want to have fun in the mountains, but their guide wants them to stay on the path.
72	20	"Holiday Home"	Eddy Fluchon & Marie-Caroline Villand	Kathleen Ponsard	TBA
Molang and Piu Piu help the animals' problems, now it is the animals' turn to help our heroes.
73	21	"The Fanfare"	Balthazar Chapuis & Marie-Caroline Villand	Olivier Som	TBA
Finding the perfect instrument is no musical picnic...
74	22	"The Shooting Stars"	Pierre Olivier	Kathleen Ponsard	TBA
Molang and Piu Piu see shooting stars through a telescope.
75	23	"The Ghost Train"	Jérôme Erbin	Sophia Daly	TBA
The ghost train is scary for poor Piu Piu, so Molang makes it from scary to fun.
76	24	"The Golf"	Eddy Fluchon & Marie-Caroline Villand	Olivier Som	TBA
The golf guide does not let Molang and Piu Piu ride the golf cart, until they play it just right.
77	25	"The Salesman"	Florence Marchal & Marie-Caroline Villand	Christophe Le Borgne	TBA
Molang and Piu Piu's house gets packed with a lot of things, so they learn how much stuff they need.
78	26	"The Boomerang"	Balthazar Chapuis & Marie-Caroline Villand	Florent Poulain	TBA
The boomerang is surrounded by a land of mean kangaroos.
79	27	"At the Farm"	Jérôme Erbin	Sophia Daly	TBA
Molang and Piu Piu may not be good farmers, but they are great at grooming a cow for a prize!
80	28	"Kung Fu"	Balthazar Chapuis & Marie-Caroline Villand	Olivier Som	TBA
The secret instructor teaches our students (Molang and Piu Piu) the ways of the crepe.
81	29	"Rainy Day"	Eddy Fluchon & Marie-Caroline Villand	Kathleen Ponsard	TBA
The rain comes down to Molang and Piu Piu's fishing trip.
82	30	"The Acrobats"	Jérôme Erbin	Sophia Daly	TBA
Molang and Piu Piu may not be good acrobats until they find an act that suits both of them.
83	31	"The Jam Jar"	Balthazar Chapuis & Marie-Caroline Villand	Sophia Daly	TBA
The jam jar lid does not dare to be opened!
84	32	"The Parrot"	Balthazar Chapuis & Marie-Caroline Villand	Sophia Daly	TBA
Piu Piu gets mistaken for a parrot.
85	33	"The Robinsons"	Balthazar Chapuis & Marie-Caroline Villand	Stéphane Cronier	TBA
Molang and Piu Piu learn to survive after another shipwreck.
86	34	"The Little Monkey"	Pierre Olivier	Florent Poulain	TBA
The little monkey does not dare to leave Molang and Piu Piu.
87	35	"The Casting"	Balthazar Chapuis & Marie-Caroline Villand	Kathleen Ponsard	TBA
Acting is harder than Molang and Piu Piu thought, except for a nursing shot...
88	36	"The Soccer Match"	Eddy Fluchon & Marie-Caroline Villand	Olivier Som	TBA
Piu Piu must overcome his fear to be a goalie after the last one got injured.
89	37	"Ski School"	Eddy Fluchon & Marie-Caroline Villand	Florent Poulain	TBA
Molang and Piu Piu attend ski school until nothing goes according to plan.
90	38	"The Incredible Animal"	Jérôme Erbin	Christophe Le Borgne	TBA
Molang and Piu Piu learn to be careful of the animals, including the white creature...
91	39	"The Jungle Friend"	Balthazar Chapuis, Eddy Fluchon & Marie-Caroline Villand	Olivier Som	TBA
Molang and Piu Piu comfort a jungle friend until they get home.
92	40	"The Monster Under the Bed"	Balthazar Chapuis, Eddy Fluchon & Marie-Caroline Villand	Kathleen Ponsard	TBA
There is a monster under Piu Piu's bed!
93	41	"Alone On the Ice Pack"	Eddy Fluchon & Marie-Caroline Villand	Sophia Daly	TBA
Molang and Piu Piu make friends with an astronomer who's eager for company.
94	42	"The Vegetable Garden"	Eddy Fluchon & Marie-Caroline Villand	Christophe Le Borgne	TBA
The birds eat Molang and Piu Piu's vegetable seeds.
95	43	"A Bottle at Sea"	Balthazar Chapuis, Eddy Fluchon & Marie-Caroline Villand	Kathleen Ponsard	TBA
Aquatic trash and a treasure hunt: What now?
96	44	"The Egg"	Balthazar Chapuis, Eddy Fluchon & Marie-Caroline Villand	Florent Poulain	TBA
Molang and Piu Piu save the egg. Watch out for that crocodile!
97	45	"The Mouse"	Balthazar Chapuis, Eddy Fluchon & Marie-Caroline Villand	Kathleen Ponsard	TBA
The cheese is on the table while our heroes slumber. Watch out for that mouse!
98	46	"The Rallye"	Balthazar Chapuis, Eddy Fluchon & Marie-Caroline Villand	Christophe Le Borgne	TBA
The beach Pinco racer has to win the race.
99	47	"The Supporters"	Balthazar Chapuis, Eddy Fluchon & Marie-Caroline Villand	Olivier Som	TBA
Piu Piu's allergies help the struggling team to win the game.
100	48	"Little Peckish"	Eddy Fluchon & Marie-Caroline Villand	Kathleen Ponsard	TBA
Molang and Piu Piu are in for an archeological dig. They chase after a groundhog that took Piu Piu's lunch until they spot an incredible cave...
101	49	"Mister Muscles"	Eddy Fluchon	Nadia Brahimi	TBA
The strong Pinco performer has a fear of mice! It is up to Molang and Piu Piu to relieve the poor performer's nerves.
102	50	"The Brioche"	Balthazar Chapuis, Eddy Fluchon & Marie-Caroline Villand	Olivier Som	TBA
Molang wins a TV cooking show, but the celebrity status makes it impossible to see Piu Piu. Our heroes miss each other.
103	51	"The Ibex"	Balthazar Chapuis, Eddy Fluchon & Marie-Caroline Villand	Kathleen Ponsard	TBA
The keys get stuck to the horns of... an ibex! It will take all Molang and Piu Piu's ingenuity to get the keys back.
104	52	"Flash Mob"	Balthazar Chapuis, Eddy Fluchon & Marie-Caroline Villand	Nadia Brahimi	TBA
Piu Piu spies on Molang and follows him to the train station. An incredible surprise awaits there!

=== Season 3 (2017) ===
No. overall	No. in season	Title	Screenplay by	Storyboarded by	Original release date
105	1	"The Instructions"	Florence Marchal & Marie-Caroline Villand	Ran Hao	TBA
The wind takes the swing set instructions away!
106	2	"The Rock Band"	Balthazar Chapuis, Eddy Fluchon & Marie-Caroline Villand	Bérengère Jacquet	TBA
The hopeful Pinco member just wants to be in the band!
107	3	"The Delivery Men"	Eddy Fluchon & Marie-Caroline Villand	Nadia Brahimi	TBA
A careless delivery Pinco drops some packages.
108	4	"Firefighters!"	Florence Marchal & Marie-Caroline Villand	Morgane Brisson	TBA
Molang and Piu Piu will do anything to be firefighters, even if it takes a lot of work, including the fire truck wash.
109	5	"Santa"	Eddy Fluchon & Marie-Caroline Villand	Mathieu Rey	TBA
After the tree topples Santa, it is up to Molang and Piu Piu to save Christmas!
110	6	"The Box"	Balthazar Chapuis, Eddy Fluchon & Marie-Caroline Villand	Ran Hao	TBA
111	7	"The Mule"	Florence Marchal & Marie-Caroline Villand	Bérengère Jacquet	TBA
112	8	"The Magic Lamp"	Eddy Fluchon & Marie-Caroline Villand	Nadia Brahimi	TBA
113	9	"The Yeti"	Florence Marchal & Marie-Caroline Villand	Ran Hao	TBA
114	10	"At the Fair"	Eddy Fluchon & Marie-Caroline Villand	Nina Degrendel	TBA
115	11	"The Rescue"	Eddy Fluchon & Marie-Caroline Villand	Sophia Daly	TBA
116	12	"The Detectives"	Florence Marchal & Marie-Caroline Villand	Morgane Brisson	TBA
117	13	"Super Molang"	Eddy Fluchon & Marie-Caroline Villand	Morgane Brisson	TBA
118	14	"The Choir"	Balthazar Chapuis, Eddy Fluchon & Marie-Caroline Villand	Morgane Brisson	TBA
119	15	"The Ghost"	Florence Marchal & Marie-Caroline Villand	Sophia Daly	TBA
120	16	"The Easter Eggs"	Florence Marchal & Marie-Caroline Villand	Nadia Brahimi	TBA
121	17	"The Alien"	Eddy Fluchon & Marie-Caroline Villand	Mathieu Rey	TBA
122	18	"Shuuuuush!"	Balthazar Chapuis, Eddy Fluchon & Marie-Caroline Villand	Mathieu Rey	TBA
123	19	"Top Model"	Florence Marchal & Marie-Caroline Villand	Christophe Le Borgne	TBA
124	20	"The Space Friends"	Eddy Fluchon & Marie-Caroline Villand	Mathieu Rey	TBA
125	21	"The Knight"	Florence Marchal & Marie-Caroline Villand	Sophia Daly	TBA
126	22	"A New Friend"	Eddy Fluchon, Florence Marchal & Marie-Caroline Villand	Nadia Brahimi	TBA
127	23	"The Haunted House"	Pierre Olivier	Morgane Brisson	TBA
128	24	"The Whale"	Florence Marchal & Marie-Caroline Villand	Nadia Brahimi	TBA
129	25	"Skate Supreme"	Mathilde Maraninchi & Antonin Poirée	Sophia Daly	TBA
130	26	"The Cap"	Eddy Fluchon, Christophe Patris & Marie-Caroline Villand	Morgane Brisson	TBA
131	27	"Mega Piu Piu"	Eddy Fluchon & Marie-Caroline Villand	Morgane Brisson	TBA
132	28	"The Bodyguards"	Balthazar Chapuis, Eddy Fluchon & Marie-Caroline Villand	Bérengère Jacquet	TBA
133	29	"The Spider"	Balthazar Chapuis, Eddy Fluchon & Marie-Caroline Villand	Ran Hao	TBA
134	30	"The Frog"	Florence Marchal & Marie-Caroline Villand	Mathieu Rey	TBA
135	31	"Electro Molang"	Florence Marchal & Marie-Caroline Villand	Ran Hao	TBA
136	32	"Watch Out"	Florence Marchal & Marie-Caroline Villand	Sophia Daly	TBA
137	33	"The Condor"	Florence Marchal & Marie-Caroline Villand	Mathieu Rey	TBA
138	34	"Actor Molang"	Aude Lener & Marie-Caroline Villand	Sophia Daly	TBA
139	35	"Mini Molang"	Florence Marchal & Marie-Caroline Villand	Nadia Brahimi	TBA
140	36	"The Dragon"	Eddy Fluchon & Marie-Caroline Villand	Ran Hao	TBA
141	37	"The Hobgoblins / Elves"	Eddy Fluchon & Marie-Caroline Villand	Morgane Brisson	TBA
142	38	"The Broom"	Eddy Fluchon & Marie-Caroline Villand	Morgane Brisson	TBA
143	39	"The Storm"	Eddy Fluchon & Marie-Caroline Villand	Mathieu Rey	TBA
144	40	"The Panda"	Eddy Fluchon & Marie-Caroline Villand	Nadia Brahimi	TBA
145	41	"The Flying Carpet"	Eddy Fluchon & Marie-Caroline Villand	Nadia Brahimi	TBA
146	42	"The Turtle"	Florence Marchal & Marie-Caroline Villand	Nadia Brahimi	TBA
147	43	"The Sand Statue"	Eddy Fluchon & Christophe Patris	Nadia Brahimi	TBA
148	44	"Into the Wild"	Eddy Fluchon, Christophe Patris & Marie-Caroline Villand	Sophia Daly	TBA
149	45	"The Sorcerer's Apprentices"	Eddy Fluchon, Fethi Nedjari & Marie-Caroline Villand	Sophia Daly	TBA
150	46	"The Husky"	Nina Degrendel	Sophia Daly	TBA
151	47	"The Call of the Forest"	Eddy Fluchon & Marie-Caroline Villand	Morgane Brisson	TBA
152	48	"The Birdling"	Eddy Fluchon & Christophe Patris	Nadia Brahimi	TBA
153	49	"The Dancers"	Balthazar Chapuis, Eddy Fluchon & Marie-Caroline Villand	Morgane Brisson	TBA
154	50	"The Pullover"	Eddy Fluchon & Marie-Caroline Villand	Sophia Daly	TBA
155	51	"The Competition (2)"	Eddy Fluchon & Marie-Caroline Villand	Morgane Brisson	Note: This is the second and last of two episodes that share the same title ("The Competition"), the first being episode 4 of season 2.
156	52	"The Long Trip"	Mathilde Maraninchi & Antonin Poirée	Sophia Daly	TBA

=== Season 4 (2019) ===
No. overall	No. in season	Title	Screenplay by	Storyboarded by	Original release date
157	1	"To the Shelter"	TBA	TBA	TBA
Molang and Piu Piu are picking berries until they find a trunk of a mammoth. The mammoth chases Molang and Piu Piu until the trees fall down, causing the pincos to lose their home. Molang and Piu Piu find a cave.
158	2	"The Saber Tooth Kitten"	TBA	TBA	TBA
Molang and Piu Piu find a small saber tooth kitten.
159	3	"The Tourney"	TBA	TBA	TBA
Molang and Piu Piu visit a medieval market to bring some bread until Molang gets invited for a tourney.

== Franchise ==
The series first aired on Canal+ France on August 14, 2014. Since then, 6 seasons, 321 episodes, and a music album have been produced and are widely broadcast. The first season has been available on Netflix since July 1, 2019. In February 2020, Millimages announced the development of Season 5 which consists of 52 episodes with each being 5 minutes long. As of 2020, Molang's TV exposure extends to more than 190 countries and has become a cross-media franchise, including merchandising, publishing, music albums, GIFs, digital series, stickers, and others. Season 5 started broadcasting on Canal+ on September 9, 2021. On May 31, 2023, Molang YouTuber (a YouTube channel with Molang and Piu Piu) started. The channel includes various types of videos like reacting, challenges, and gaming. On December 8, 2023, M4P, a virtual K-pop band that includes Molang, Piu Piu, Shiny Pinco, Moody Pinco and Sweetie Pinco, started, launching their first song "Whatever You Want".

== Broadcast ==
The show also airs in different countries, such as Tiny Pop in the United Kingdom, Treehouse TV in Canada & Disney Jr. in the United States. Millimages has announced that every episode is now available to stream on Hopster Learning in the United States as of October 19, 2022.

== Discography ==
=== Albums ===
Number	Title	Artist(s)	Time	Songs	Genre	Release date	Label(s)
1	Molang	Molang	13:21	10	Pop	April 1, 2020	Millimages

=== Singles ===
Number	Title	Artist(s)	Time	Songs	Genre	Release date	Label(s)
1	Whatever You Want	M4P	3:30	1	K-Pop	December 8, 2023	Millimages
1	Gravity	M4P	3:17	1	K-pop	April 23, 2025	Millimages

=== EPs ===
Number	Title	Artist(s)	Time	Songs	Genre	Release date	Label(s)
1	A Merry Molang Christmas	Molang	8:28	6	Holiday	November 18, 2020	Millimages

On April 1, 2020, the first "music album" called Molang was released on every streaming platform, including Spotify, iTunes, Deezer, Amazon, and more. As of late April 2020, this album has been streamed more than 40,000 times on Spotify and 20,000 times on iTunes. On November 18, 2020, the EP A Merry Molang Christmas was released. There had been speculation regarding the release of the second music album, though this had yet to be confirmed. On December 10, 2020, the official social media account of Molang uploaded the first post introducing A Merry Molang Christmas. On November 27, 2023. Molang posted a video of them making a K-pop song and teasing the title. The song got released on December 8, 2023, on all music platforms as the band M4P, a band with 5 members: Molang, the leader, Sweetie Pinco, Piu Piu, Shiny Pinco and Moody Pinco.

== Merchandising ==
As a merchandising brand, Molang uses "My Best Friend" as a universal signature for all worldwide licensees, on all packaging. It now represents two master toy licensees (Tomy and Jazwares), over 100 licensees worldwide, and more than 700 different products, including kids' and adults' apparel, children's books and magazines, stationery, magnets, stickers, underwear, and sleepwear.

=== Books ===
In November 2016, the French publisher Flammarion launched a collection of four little square books based on the series episodes and one big album. In Easter 2017, seven new books were published and were specially promoted by the broadcaster. Among them, four little square books and one album, and two lift-the-flap books in which children have to search for hidden characters and animals.

Scholastic Inc., the world's largest publisher of children's books, has published four 8x8 books and one album. All the books include stickers and the album contains a sticker storybook with more than 25 stickers and four pages to decorate. They are available to all national retailers, independents, special market channels and through Scholastic Reading Club and Scholastic Book Fairs. In October 2018, the Italian publisher Gribaudo published six activity books with games, colouring pages, stickers and different activities.

The publisher Nelson Verlag launched a range of their mini books dedicated to Molang in early 2020 in Germany.

=== DVDs ===
Title	Region	Release date
Molang – season 1 as seen on Disney Junior	United States	August 15, 2017
Molang – season 2 as seen on Disney Junior	United States	May 1, 2018
Molang – season 3 as seen on Disney Junior	United States	December 23, 2019
Molang – season 1	North America	August 15, 2017
Molang – season 2	North America	April 3, 2018
Molang Season 1 – Nel Bosco	Italy	September 6, 2018
Molang Season 1 – Super Star	Italy	September 6, 2018
Molang Season 2 – Safari	Italy	2019
Molang Season 1 – Vol 1 – The Party	Nordics	June 11, 2018
Molang Season 1 – Vol 2 – The Party	Nordics	June 11, 2019
Molang Season 1 – Vol 1	United Kingdom	TBA
Molang Season 1 – Vol 2	United Kingdom	TBA

== See also ==
- Rabbids
- LuLu the Piggy
- Pusheen
