= The Three Friends and Jerry =

- The main cast of The Three Friends and Jerry. From left to right: Frank, Eric, Thomas, Jerry, Linda, Mimmi, and Tess.
- Created by: Magnus Carlsson
- Composer: Danny Chang
- Countries of origin: Sweden; Germany; United Kingdom
- Original languages: Swedish; German; English
- No. of seasons: 3
- No. of episodes: 39 (91 segments)

Production
- Executive producers: Peter Völke; Peter Gustafsson
- Running time: 22–25 minutes
- Production companies: Happy Life; TMO Film GmbH

Original release
- Network: SVT (Sweden); KiKA (Germany); Nickelodeon (United Kingdom)
- Release: February 1, 1998 – 1999

Related
- Robin

The Three Friends and Jerry (Swedish: De tre vännerna och Jerry) is a children's animated television series produced by Happy Life and TMO Film GmbH (Germany) in association with Nickelodeon UK and Nickelodeon Germany. The show was created by the Swedish illustrator Magnus Carlsson.

HIT Entertainment distributed the series internationally and is listed in the end credits. When HIT Entertainment partnered to launch PBS Kids Sprout in 2005, in collaboration with Sesame Workshop, PBS & Comcast The Three Friends and Jerry was made available on Sprout on Demand.

== Plot ==
Jerry is the new kid in town who does not fit with any of his classmates. This show follows his best attempts to join the 'Three Friends' — Thomas, Eric, and their leader Frank — who do not want him to be part of their group but still let him hang out with them as long as he helps them with their schemes or problems. The friends are often joined by three of their girl classmates: Linda, Mimmi, and Tess and try (and usually fail) to win them over. Usually their antics often result in humiliating situations. Apart from school, the group have to contend with parents, bullies and their own conflicts.

The show takes place in the town of Carlsonville (most likely named after Magnus himself), which is located either in Sweden, Germany or the United Kingdom.

== Characters ==
=== Main ===
- Jerry (voiced by Viktor Birath (seasons 1–2) and Joakim Beutler (season 3) (original); Joona Saastamoinen (Dubbed)) is the new kid in town, who has blond hair and buck teeth. He is a calm and bright boy with a head full of ideas. He desperately wants to join the eponymous Three Friends, but they do not see him as part of their group.
- Frank (voiced by Sean Bussoli (original), Archit Tripathi (Dubbed)) is the leader of the Three Friends. He is a bald-headed boy who wears a blue T-shirt with a yellow number 1. The polar opposite to Jerry, Frank is short-tempered and cunning. Due to his appearance, he is seen as the ugliest boy in school. He ineffectively tries to win the heart of the leader of the girl gang – Linda – despite the fact they are actually cousins.
- Thomas (voiced by Robby Johansson) is a boy with an orange hoodie, never seen without his big green cap. He is dominated by Frank and normally takes his side. Thomas is a very good artist, but he is self-conscious and feels that he needs to hide his creative nature.
- Eric (voiced by Peter Ecimovic) is a boy with chin-length blond hair and a green T-shirt. He loves football and is the best sports player in the school. Just like Thomas, Eric is dominated by Frank. He is also prone to suffering from a weak stomach.
- Linda (voiced by Gabriella Wegdell) is the leader of the girl gang who sometimes acts like a spoiled brat and uses strong language. She is a bit tougher and a little more mature than her two friends, Mimmi and Tess. Linda is also Frank's cousin.
- Mimmi (voiced by Linnéa Hincks) is an Asian girl who lives next door to Linda and has a swimming pool in her garden. She wears a blue dress with a smiley face symbol. Her adoptive father has his own business and lots of money. Mimmi considers her wealth as her main asset.
- Tess (voiced by Sara Berling) is a short and shy girl who tends to blindly follow Linda. Tess's older brother, Tony, is a cool teenager who drives her to school on his moped. Tess has short blonde hair and wears a white shirt, purple skirt, and green shoes.

=== Minor ===
- The Teacher (voiced by Anna Pettersson) teaches Jerry's class. She always has unshaven legs. The Three Friends and Jerry often try to send her into space so they will not have any lessons.
- The PE Teacher (voiced by Rolf Skoglund) is Jerry's foul-tempered father. He tends to act very loud with the Three Friends and his son, but he has a good heart and intentions. He has red hair and an athletic and muscular body. He lives in a one-floor house with his wife and son.
- Jerry's mother (voiced by Gunilla Orvelius) is the PE Teacher's wife. She has a caring and calm personality. Jerry inherited his looks and personality from her.
- Roy Johnson (voiced by Anders Mårtensson) is Mimmi's adoptive father and the wealthiest person in the town. He runs the local shop.
- Monica (voiced by Helena af Sandeberg) is an attractive brunette who works at Roy's shop. She is also Tony's girlfriend.
- Tony (voiced by Nick Anderson) is a heavy metal guitarist, Tess' 16-year-old brother and Monica's boyfriend.
- Dick Priest (voiced by Gunnar Uddén) keeps an eye on the town. As a priest, he works in the church. Despite campaigning against everything he deems as immoral, he is revealed to be a fan of metal music and horror movies.
- Mr. and Mrs. Ingrid Bertwhistle are Jerry's neighbours. Mr. Bertwhistle is a grumpy man obsessed with contacting extraterrestrials. The boys like him to some degree, but he does not fare well with Jerry's father due to his anger issues. Meanwhile Mrs. Bertwhistle is the librarian of the town's public library, she is also a very vocal activist against certain things she believes "corrupts" children.
- Oscar (voiced by Hasse Andersson) is a local bum who everybody in the town looks down upon. Several years ago, he was a wealthy and respected person. Everything changed when, while being a beauty contest juror, he mistakenly gave the first place to Jerry, when Roy previously bribed him to make his daughter Mimmi win. After losing his wealth, he lives in an old shack. Most of the children are afraid of him.

== Production ==
The Three Friends and Jerry was produced by Happy Life (Sweden) and TMO Film GmbH (Germany) in association with Nickelodeon UK and Nickelodeon Germany. Internationally, the series was distributed by HIT Entertainment.

In an interview from late 2020, Magnus Carlsson revealed many things about the development of the series. Carlsson first drew the characters around 1993 or 1994, and he later made an animated short starring the characters getting into trouble with drinking. It was originally pitched to Comedy Central at first, but was rejected for being too similar to South Park, Carlsson decided to retool the show to be more family-friendly, with him basing the main characters on actual friends he knew growing up (with Thomas being based on himself). When asked about content in the show, Carlsson said that it was never a big deal or problem in Sweden.

The main characters' long foreheads were inspired by the film “Coneheads”.

He also initially wanted the theme song to be a reggae song but it was changed to a more Polka sounding melody.

== Telecast and home media ==
In Sweden, the series first aired on SVT for its original run, after ending, the channel aired reruns until November 8, 2005, with a brief return in 2008. It would also air reruns on SVT Barn from June 14, 2004 until October 30, 2011, when it was replaced by Corneil & Bernie.

The show was originally aired in the United Kingdom on Nickelodeon and Nicktoons, with reruns remaining until 2010, mainly to fulfill European content guidelines.

In Germany, the show was planned to air on Nickelodeon Germany, and Nickelodeon Germany is listed in the first few episodes' credits. However, the original incarnation of Nick Germany shut down in mid-1998. The series did not premiere in the country until 2001, when KiKA acquired free-TV rights. It also aired on Fox Kids (later Jetix and Disney XD) in the country. The series would start rerunning on ProSieben MAXX from 2013 until 2014.

In the U.S., the show initially aired from 1998 until 2000 on the Fox Family Channel. It also aired on the short-lived Boyz Channel. In 2005, the show's distributor, HIT Entertainment, partnered to launch the PBS Kids Sprout channel. The show was available on Sprout on Demand until late 2006.

In Canada, the show aired on YTV from 1999 until 2001, and in Australia, it aired on Nickelodeon. It also aired on NCRV in the Netherlands, Nickelodeon in Latin America, Boing in Spain, 2x2 in Russia, Premiere Austria in Austria, and Arutz HaYeladim in Israel.

The series mostly aired on Fox Kids/Jetix and Nickelodeon channels worldwide.

In the late 1990s-2000s, the show was released on VHS (in Sweden only) and DVDs internationally, but never released in North America. Most notably in Australia by Magna Home Entertainment, who released various episodes through 7 volumes.

== Episodes ==
=== Season 1 ===
No.	Title	Directed by	Written by
1	"Kissing Linda Bank Robbery Ant Hill"	Magnus Carlsson; Ray Kosarin	Håkan Östlundh; Gabriel Arthur
Kissing Linda: When Linda's parents are away for a weekend, Linda must stay at Frank's and Frank tries to kiss her. Bank Robbery: The Three Friends and Jerry are framed by the police to be the children gang, after the real gang robbed the bank. Ant Hill: After having the accident at the ant hill, Frank seeks revenge on the ants and seeks Thomas and Eric's help in destroying the ants.
2	"UFO-Spotting Brake Slamming The Circus"	Magnus Carlsson	Håkan Östlundh Magnus Carlsson Håkan Östlundh
UFO-Spotting: Frank is abducted by the aliens and controlled. Thomas, Eric and Jerry must save Frank before it's too late. Brake Slamming: Frank is happy with his new bike, which has pedal brakes. The Circus: While on a trip around the circus, Jerry accidentally brakes free two ostriches. Can he and the Three Friends bring the ostriches back to the circus before the performance starts?
3	"Work Experience Barking Up The Wrong Tree The Beauty Contest"	Magnus Carlsson Magnus Carlsson Ray Kosarin	Håkan Östlundh
Work Experience: The Three Friends get lost inside the forest. Barking Up The Wrong Tree: The Three Friends and Jerry become stars of TV. The Beauty Contest: Linda and her mother watch a film of the beauty contest in which Linda loses.
4	"Stars in Your Eyes Fashion The Snowball Fight"	Ray Kosarin Magnus Carlsson Magnus Carlsson	Gabriel Arthur Håkan Östlundh Håkan Östlundh
Stars in Your Eyes: The Three Friends and Jerry pretend to be a scary rock band called Dog Sun for the music contest, but they're unaware this is with a nice music. Fashion: The Three Friends and Jerry try to be cool. The Snowball Fight: After The Three Friends and Jerry accidentally crashed Oscar's house, Jerry must bring Oscar to his house, while The Three Friends must rebuild the house. Can Jerry hide Oscar from his parents?
5	"Ice Hockey My Friend is An Ant Neat and Tidy"	Magnus Carlsson Ray Kosarin Magnus Carlsson	Gabriel Arthur Jari Sempill Håkan Östlundh
Ice Hockey: The Three Friends and Jerry and the girls are having an ice hockey match. Who will win? My Friend is An Ant: Jerry tries to save his little ant from the clutches of Arthur in the museum of the Earth's history. Neat and Tidy: Frank's mother orders Frank to be neat and tidy for the rest of the day and he will earn ten dollars. Can he be neat and tidy for the rest of the day?
6	"Tony's Party The Fishing Trip Carol Singing"	Magnus Carlsson	Håkan Östlundh
Tony's Party: The Three Friends and Jerry disguise themselves as teens in order to get into Tony's party. The Fishing Trip: The Three Friends and Jerry and the girls go on a fishing trip. Carol Singing: The Three Friends and Jerry sing songs for Christmas.
7	"South Sea The Club House The Forging Machine"	Magnus Carlsson	Håkan Östlundh Håkan Östlundh Anders Brundin
South Sea: Frank has a terrible dream of himself with Thomas, Eric, and Jerry at a tropical island which turns out to be surrounded by natives who are cannibalistic. The Club House: Jerry must take three tests to become a teammate of The Three Friends. The Forging Machine: Jerry creates a machine what will create money.
8	"Cowboys The Delivery Old People's Party"	Magnus Carlsson Ray Kosarin Magnus Carlsson	Gabriel Arthur Lars Johansson Gabriel Arthur
Cowboys: While The Three Friends and the girls are out horseriding, Jerry accidentally breaks the teacher's cup. The Delivery: Jerry becomes a delivery boy. Old People's Party: The class of the Three Friends and Jerry makes a party for the elder people.
9	"Scientists 'R' Us Camping Boomerang"	Magnus Carlsson Ray Kosarin Ray Kosarin	Peder Erneroth Håkan Östlundh Håkan Östlundh
Scientists 'R' Us: The Three Friends seek Jerry's help to win the radio quiz "Scientists 'R' Us". Camping: The Three Friends and Jerry are go camping at Thomas' garden. Boomerang: Frank tries to learn how to toss a boomerang.
10	"Frightening Fifth Form Jerry's Lucky Day Catch the Girl"	Magnus Carlsson Ray Kosarin Ray Kosarin	Håkan Östlundh Peder Erneroth Anders Brundin
Frightening Fifth Form: Frank is frightened of the blood handed teen. Jerry's Lucky Day: Jerry is having a lucky day. Catch the Girl: The Three Friends and Jerry are worried about a prisoner named Jimmy.
11	"The Flea Market Head Lice Supermart"	Ray Kosarin Magnus Carlsson Magnus Carlsson	Peder Erneroth Håkan Östlundh Håkan Östlundh
The Flea Market: Jerry sells his aunt's vase to an old lady. Head Lice: Jerry puts little ants on his and The Three Friends' heads to pretend they have head lice. Supermart: While out shopping with their parents, The Three Friends and Jerry have a ski race in the supermarket's chill room.
12	"Country Cousin Secret Mission Hackers"	Magnus Carlsson	Peder Erneroth
Country Cousin: Frank's cousin comes to town. Secret Mission: Frank, Eric and Jerry try to follow Thomas to discover his secret. Hackers: Jerry hacks a plane computer and ends up having Ahmet Ben Party and his family and friends at the wrong stop.
13	"The Moose Hunt Cheat and Curse The Rodent Exhibition"	Magnus Carlsson Ray Kosarin Ray Kosarin	Håkan Östlundh Lena Ollmark Malin Gullbrand
The Moose Hunt: A moose arrives at Frank's house. Cheat and Curse: An evil fairy puts a curse on The Three Friends and Jerry. The Rodent Exhibition: The Three Friends and Jerry take Jerry's father's African instruments for the school performance.

=== Season 2 ===
No.	Title	Directed by	Written by
14	"Museum Martial Arts"	Ray Kosarin Petra Selldén	Håkan Östlundh Jan Vierth
Museum: The 3 Friends and Jerry go on a field trip to the museum in the big city. Martial Arts: Frank takes martial art classes to help him face up against a bully.
15	"Costume Party Christmas Party"	Ray Kosarin Petra Selldén	Markus Ernerot Lena Ollmark
Costume Party: The 3 Friends and Jerry try to enter a costume party but end up mixing Jerry up with a real gorilla. Christmas Party: The 3 Friends and Jerry must set up a Christmas party.
16	"Babysitting Romeo & Juliet"	Petra Selldén Ray Kosarin	Jan Vierth Andy Secombe & Teddy Kempner
Babysitting: The 3 Friends and Jerry challenge Linda that they can babysit better than her. Romeo & Juliet: Frank becomes love-sick trying to practice for the school play.
17	"Caretaker TV Gossip"	David Elvin Petra Selldén	Jan Vierth
Caretaker: The Three Friends and Jerry along with the girls investigate a mysterious man. TV Gossip: Jerry's dad gets framed on live television.
18	"Triplets Girls Clothes"	Ray Kosarin Petra Selldén	Lena Ollmark Markus Ernerot
Triplets: A group of Triplets arrive in town from New-Zealand who quickly befriend The Three Friends. Girls Clothes: Today is Eric’s birthday. When he, Frank, Jerry & Thomas go out for a swim in a pond, a goat appears who eats all of their clothes. With Jerry tasked to find something for them and himself to wear, they come across bags containing girly clothing, while they don’t know they belong to Linda, Mimmi & Tess who also took photos of them naked.
19	"Moose Gang Survival Camp"	Ray Kosarin	Andy Secombe & Teddy Kempner Maria Olsson
Moose Gang: Jerry joins the infamous Moose Gang and quickly becomes popular with the girls. Survival Camp: The kids of the neighborhood are forced to attend survival camp out of fear of becoming criminals.
20	"Visitors From Outer Space Stray Dog"	Petra Selldén	Anders Sparring Nigel Crowle
Visitors From Outer Space: Frank, Thomas, Eric and Jerry attempt to convince people that aliens are real. Stray Dog: Jerry finds a dog and adopts it, little does he know what it actually is.
21	"The Substitute Green Thumbs"	Ray Kosarin Petra Selldén	Lena Ollmark Markus Ernerot
The Substitute: Eric falls in love with the new substitute teacher. Green Thumbs: Jerry tricks the three friends into thinking plants are evil.
22	"The Lost Ark Jazz Prodigy"	David Elvin Ray Kosarin	Peder Ernerdt Jan Vierth
The Lost Ark: The Three Friends and Jerry try to go to space using Bertwhistle's rocket. Jazz Prodigy: Frank is allergic to flowers, however they end up giving him an amazing singing voice.
23	"Pen Pal Family Matters"	Ray Kosarin David Elvin	Anders Sparring Nigel Crowle
Pen Pal: Frank and the gang catfish people via mail. Family Matters: Jerry finds out he's related to royalty.
24	"Wooing for Beginners Glasses"	Petra Selldén David Elvin	Andy Secombe & Teddy Kempner Markus Ernerot
Wooing for Beginners: Jerry attempts to give Frank dating advice to win the heart of Linda via a book called "Wooing for Beginners". Glasses: Frank is forced to wear glasses for a couple of days and is made fun of by his friends.
25	"Genie in the Glass Forbidden Fruit"	Ray Kosarin Petra Selldén	Jan Vierth Torbjörn Jansson
Genie in the Glass: Frank, Linda, and the rest of the gang try to use a Ouija board. Forbidden Fruit: Frank becomes catatonic after seeing Monica naked.
26	"Traffic Sense Miss Jerry"	Ray Kosarin Petra Selldén	Anders Sparring
Traffic Sense: Jerry challenges the neighborhood kids to say everything opposite to what they mean. Miss Jerry: The Three Friends blackmail Jerry into entering a beauty contest disguised as a girl.

=== Season 3 ===
No.	Title	Directed by	Written by
27	"Junior Show Super Model"	David Elvin Ray Kosarin	Andy Secombe & Teddy Kempner Jan Vierth
Junior Show: Dick Priest hires Jerry for a new radio show and he starts to mess with people as a result. Super Model: Frank and Linda become super models, however Jerry ends up messing with Frank.
28	"Our Son is an Ostrich Age Limit"	David Elvin Petra Selldén	Torbjörn Jansson Markus Ernerot
Our Son Is An Ostrich: Thomas gets mixed up with an ostrich. Age Limit: Frank, Thomas, Eric and Jerry use a machine that makes them older.
29	"Garden Party Snowman"	David Elvin Ray Kosarin	Jan Vierth
Garden Party: The Three Friends and Jerry try to find Roy Johnson's statues. Snowman: Frank, Thomas, Eric and Jerry pretend to be the abominable snowman.
30	"Sewergators The Move"	David Elvin Ray Kosarin	Torbjörn Jansson Lena Ollmark
Sewergators: Jerry pretends to flush Mimmi's fish down the toilet. The Move: Jerry and his family move to another town, meanwhile Frank and his friends try to get into Mimmi's house.
31	"Dance Mania Archaeological Dig"	Petra Selldén David Elvin	Anders Sparring Nigel Crowle
Dance Mania: Thomas gets invited to Roy Johnson's dance party. Archaeological Dig: Roy Johnson tries to take down a historical area in favor of a candy theme park.
32	"Jacket III Veteran Rock"	Petra Selldén David Elvin	Nigel Crowle Anders Sparring
Jacket III: Jerry pranks the three friends and the girls into thinking a horror movie monster named "The Jacket" is real. Veteran Rock: The Three Friends and Jerry try to start a band but Frank, Thomas and Eric's dads and Linda's mom end up embarrassing them.
33	"Spring Feelings Cockatoo"	David Elvin Ray Kosarin	Peder Ernerot
Spring Feelings: Frank becomes love-sick with Mimmi due to a mix-up. Cockatoo: Frank gets a pet bird.
34	"Judgement Day Curing Phobias"	Ray Kosarin David Elvin	Andy Secombe & Teddy Kempner Jan Vierth
Judgement Day: Jerry thinks that judgement day is upon him and the three friends. Curing Phobias: Jerry tries to cure Frank and Eric's phobias.
35	"Sleepwalker School Paper"	Ray Kosarin	Anders Sparring Lena Ollmark & Anders Sparring
Sleepwalker: Frank starts to sleep walk. School Paper: Frank must work in the school paper to improve his grades.
36	"Record Cake Miracle Cream"	Petra Selldén	Jan Vierth
Record Cake: Roy Johnson makes a record cake for a celebrity to ride on. Miracle Cream: Frank and Jerry help a fashion model out on his promotion of his beauty cream.
37	"Swimming Teacher Magic Tricks"	David Elvin Petra Selldén	Maria Olsson Lena Ollmark
Swimming Teacher: The Three Friends and Jerry fall in love with a new swimming teacher. Magic Tricks: Jerry makes everyone believe he has magical powers.
38	"Frog Collection Night Owl"	Petra Selldén Ray Kosarin	Nigel Crowle Jan Vierth
Frog Collection: Jerry and Frank start their own frog collections in order to impress Linda and Tony. Night Owl: All the kids try to stay up late, with the one who stays up late the most getting to go to the movies with Linda.
39	"Olympic Games Secret Box"	Petra Selldén Ray Kosarin	Andy Secombe, Teddy Hempner & Anders Sparring Anders Sparring
Olympic Games: Jerry starts an Olympic challenge for kids and parents, however his dad ends up ruining it. Secret Box: Frank gets sporty to impress Linda.
