= Corky Quakenbush =

TV and film worker

Corky Quakenbush (b. c. 1958) is an American writer, producer, and cameraman who has worked in motion pictures and TV series. One of his specialties is stop-motion animation. Quakenbush worked in the production of Carl Sagan's science series Cosmos: A Personal Voyage during 1979–80.

== Career ==
Independently and through his company Space Bass Films, Quakenbush has produced more than 100 short films as standalone works and as part of larger collections. His work has appeared in Mike Judge's The Animation Show and on MADtv on Fox TV. His parodies of the Rankin/Bass Rudolph the Red-Nosed Reindeer for Christmas episodes of That '70s Show and George Lopez were mentioned in the book The Enchanted World of Rankin/Bass by Rick Goldschmidt. Quakenbush's films generally have adult-oriented themes of comic violence, blending the innocent with the profane.

Quakenbush holds a record for number of films screened in competition at the Sundance Film Festival by one director (nine), including A Pack of Gifts Now, which was awarded "honorable mention" in 1999. His work has also screened at a retrospective program at the Boston Museum of Fine Arts, and the shorts CLOPS and CLOPS II appeared in 2000 "Situating Comedy", a program exploring social satire in cinema at the Solomon R. Guggenheim Museum.

Quakenbush's work in television includes producing and directing live-action and animated pilots for Gary & Mike and Drew Carey's Green Screen Show, although he did not participate in the subsequent series. In 2010, Quakenbush joined the directing roster of the commercial production company ka-chew! He was also a director on the TBS television series The Chimp Channel.
