= Happy Trails Animation =

Digital motion animation company

Happy Trails Animation LLC, is an American animation studio specializing in feature films, commercials, music videos, broadcast graphics and short films. It is owned by Andy and Amy Collen and is located in Portland, Oregon. The company has two divisions, one for digital content and the other for commercial work such as advertisements and music or corporate videos. Happy Trails Animation has received 11 Telly Awards, 1 Crystal Heart Award, 3 Davey Awards, and numerous international film festival acknowledgments from its short films over the past 18 years.

== History ==
The studio, known for mixed media films and commercials, was started by husband and wife animators in Portland Oregon 1991. Both Andy and Amy Collen had been freelance animators in the Portland area for Will Vinton Studios during the early 1990s. Over the years Happy Trails Animation has worked on projects ranging from short films like "Rip & Glide" for MTV's Cartoon Sushi to stereoscopic 3D corporate logos for companies like Jupiter 9 Productions for their new Sci-fi feature Quantum Quest to be released through IMAX theaters around the world in late 2009.

== Films ==
Over the years Happy Trails Animation has traveled the world of Film Festivals with their short films. Each film is in a different style of animation. The studio is known for exploring with new mediums with their short films. Many of these films have won awards. A few of their films are:

• 1996: Hero Sandwich - Historical first-ever colored sand animation.

• 2004: Winter / En Hiver - Animated in a quill pen style; an homage to illustrators like Edward Gorey (Received Telly Award, Crystal Heart Award).

• 2007: For Annie - A short film based on the works of Edgar Allan Poe; animated in a digital painting style (Received Telly Award).

• 2009: Gideon The Great - The Flying Ace - (Received Telly Award)

== References for Happy Trails Animation ==
- Rick, DeMott, http://www.awn.com/news/commercials/happy-trails-wraps-new-cinemark-front-row-joe-short, article on a Cinemark's 2D policy trailer produced by Happy Trails Animation, April 14, 2004
- Andre, Maxwell, http://newenglandfilm.com/magazine/2005/05/pictures-in-motion, New England Film interview with producer director Andy Collen of Happy Trails Animation about working in animation, May 1, 2005

== References for Winter/EnHiver ==
- Arron, Howland, http://www.bostonawards.com/winter.htm%5B%5D, Boston Motion Picture Awards is an annual film competition, February 24, 2004
- Andre, Maxwell, http://newenglandfilm.com/magazine/2005/05/pictures-in-motion, New England Film interview with producer director Andy Collen of Happy Trails Animation about the film Winter, May 1, 2005

== External links: Gideon The Great: The Flying Ace ==
- http://www.tellyawards.com/winners/list/entries/?l=H&event=&category=2&award=2
- https://www.imdb.com/title/tt1387369/plotsummary
- http://dbff.bside.com/2009/films/gideonthegreattheflyingace_dbff2009;jsessionid=CABCF0AC6776F6164321DC7C84BD6B3A
- https://www.youtube.com/watch?v=i7ZloJ-PWJ8
