= Lisa (TV series) =

- Genre: Animated cartoon, Preschool
- Created by: Magnus Carlsson
- Directed by: Magnus Carlsson
- Narrated by: Gösta Ekman
- Theme music composer: Magnus Carlsson
- Composer: Magnus Carlsson
- Countries of origin: Germany; Sweden; Hungary
- Original languages: Swedish; German; English
- No. of seasons: 1
- No. of episodes: 14

Production
- Producer: Magnus Carlsson
- Running time: 6-7 min (average)
- Production companies: Happy Life; TMO Film GmbH

Original release
- Network: SVT1 (Sweden); KIKA (Germany)
- Release: 1998 – 2001

Lisa is a Swedish-German-Hungarian animated preschool television series created by Magnus Carlsson. It was produced by Happy Life and is aimed at younger children.

== Production and telecast ==
The Lisa series was first produced as a series of cinematically-released short films. The first short film, Lisa får en barnvakt, premiered in June 1996 and was released as a book the following year. Two further short films, Lisa hos tandläkaren and Lisa på picknick, were granted funding from the Swedish Film Institute in February 1997 and released in January 1998.

The series was aired on SVT beginning in 1999. It also aired on KIKA in Germany. In addition with English voices, it screened on Nick Jr. in the United Kingdom and HBO Family in the US, as well as distributed internationally by Fox Kids. There were also some books made based on the series. The series was narrated by Gösta Ekman.

Carlsson left Happy Life for a few years after having co-founded the studio, but Happy Life went on to produce more episodes of Lisa without Carlsson's involvement nor approval. Carlsson then sued his former employer for copyright infringement, a lawsuit he won in arbitration by January 2002.

== Plot ==
The series focuses on Lisa, a title little girl lead who also serves as the narrator. She lives with her parents in a two-story house. Sometimes, she visits his dad's place of work and they walk around town. She likes to play with her parents and neighbours. Various children have playmates and play in her yard.

== Characters ==
- Lisa is a little girl with curly, stringed hair and eyelashes.
- Mum and Dad are the parents of Lisa. Mum does the housework and often goes shopping with Lisa. Dad works at the other end of the city, but once vacationed on the Canary Islands, where he got very sunburnt.
- Aunt Wilson is Lisa's neighbour and aunt, she likes to play with Lisa.
- Uncle Wilson is Lisa's spectacled, half-bald, slim uncle, who lives in Lisa's flat next door.
- Holger is a big-eared boy and one of Lisa's friends.
- The Fat Aunt is Lisa's aunt, and she can only get into the elevator by turning to the side.

== TV episodes ==
No.	Name
1	At the Shopping Centre
2	Holger with Big Ears
3	At the Dentist
4	Goes On a Plane
5	Paints The Bathroom
6	Lisa's Space Adventure
7	Scared of Loll
8	Gets a Babysitter
9	The Davidsons
10	The Dinner Party
11	The Fancy Dress Party
12	Waving Club
13	What Am I Going to Be When I Grow Up
14	The Painter
15	Picking Apples
16	The Fleamarket
17	Watch out Lisa!
