= Magnus Carlsson (illustrator) =

Swedish Director, illustrator animator

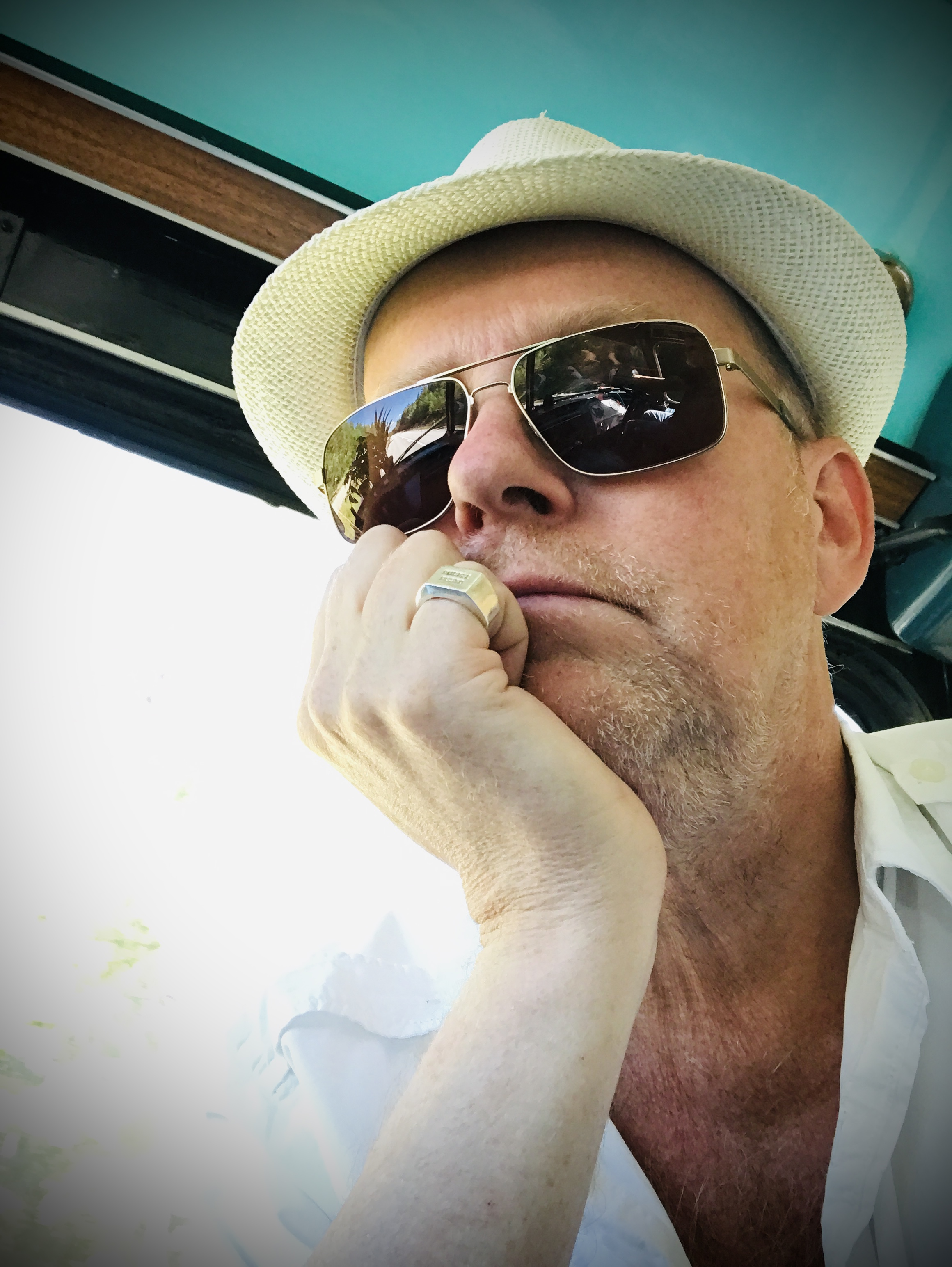
- Born: Gothenburg, Västra Götaland, Sweden
- Occupations: Film director; producer; illustrator; animator; writer; composer
- Years active: 1988–present

Magnus Carlsson is a Swedish illustrator, director and animator.

== Biography ==
Carlsson was born in Gothenburg, Västra Götaland. He started animating professionally in 1988.

In the early 90s, Carlsson made stop-motion animated shorts, often with satirical themes. In 1996, he began making Robin, a series of shorts about a young man's urban adventures. The Robin shorts were popular with the members of the English rock band Radiohead, who commissioned Carlsson to create the video for their song "Paranoid Android", featuring the Robin character. His other television works include The Three Friends and Jerry, which has been distributed to over 100 countries, and the children's short series Lisa. In 2006, Carlsson made the stop-motion feature film Desmond & the Swamp Barbarian Trap. In 2018, with Jens Ganman, he made the satirical cartoon Så att det blir rätt (So That It's Right).

Carlsson has also created ads for companies such as Fiat and Libresse.

== Filmography ==
=== Television ===
- Robin (1996)
- Lisa (1998)
- The Three Friends and Jerry (De tre vännerna och Jerry) (1998)
- Da Möb (2001)
- Benny Pripp and his Fuzzy Lip (Benny Brun och hans Överlapsfjun) (2014)

=== Film ===
- Desmond & the Swamp Barbarian Trap (Desmond & träskpatraskfällan) (2006)

=== Stand-Alone Shorts ===
- Alice in Plasmalandet (1993)
- Sverige (1996)
- Desmond's Trashed Apple Tree (Desmonds trashade äppelträd) (2004)
- So That It's Right (Så att det blir rätt) (2018)

=== Music Videos ===
- Radiohead- "Paranoid Android" (1997)
- XNilo- "Bodyline" (2020)
- Elliott Waits For No One- "Marry Me Girl" (2023)
