= Robin (TV series) =

- Genre: Adult animation Animated sitcom Slapstick comedy
- Created by: Magnus Carlsson
- Directed by: Magnus Carlsson
- Narrated by: Dave Avellone
- Theme music composer: Magnus Carlsson
- Composer: Magnus Carlsson
- Countries of origin: Canada; Germany; Sweden
- Original language: Swedish
- No. of episodes: 30

Production
- Producer: Magnus Carlsson
- Running time: 3 min (average)
- Production companies: Happy Life; TMO Film GmbH; Nelvana

Original release
- Network: SVT1; MTV (USA)
- Release: 1996

Related
- Lisa

Robin is a 1996 adult animated TV sitcom created by Swedish cartoonist Magnus Carlsson and narrated by Dave Avellone in the English dub. It was mainly aimed at an adult audience.

== Plot ==
Every episode focused on the title unemployed bachelor, in his early twenties and his best friend Benjamin, who is African-Swedish. While neither seems to do anything constructive with their lives, they are involved in various misadventures, mostly resulting in a non-sequitur ending. The following episode will feature no mention of past encounters.

The two (or frequently, Robin alone) will have run-ins with the law, encounter drunks, flashers and other uneven characters.

== Influence ==
In 1997, after the screening of Robin on Channel 4 in the United Kingdom, British rock band Radiohead approached Magnus Carlsson to make a music video for their song, titled "Paranoid Android" with Robin in it. Carlsson accepted and came up with the original idea for the video after locking himself in his office, staring out the window at a bridge and listening to nothing but Paranoid Android repeatedly.

During the video of "Paranoid Android", the band makes a cameo appearance at a bar, where they are sitting at a table drinking and watching a person with a head coming out of his stomach dancing on their table.

== Episodes ==
1. The Bums
2. Drafted
3. The Party
4. The Mime Artist
5. Frogman
6. Plumbing
7. The Crow
8. Drug Demo
9. The Fire
10. Party With a Chair
11. Grannie
12. The Dentist
13. The Lonely Hearts Ad
14. Plastic Surgery
15. Snowboarding
16. Harry at The Barber's
17. The Shaveonologist
18. The Film Buff
19. The Pinch
20. The Record Company
21. Down Under
22. Mooning
23. Harry The Smoker
24. The Exhibitionist
25. The Film Director
26. The Foster Grandfather
27. Weird Things
28. Divine Service
29. Uncle Harry
30. Shopping

== Censorship ==
The show was banned in Singapore and MTV's US version censored elements like nipples and urine streams.
