= Anna Blomberg =

Swedish actress and comedian (born 1972)

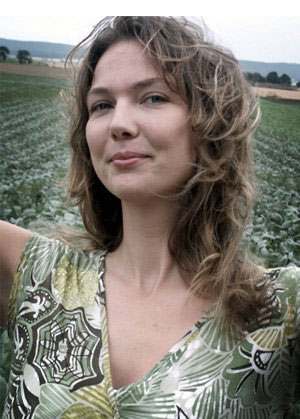
- Born: Anna Kristina Cecilia Blomberg; 20 May 1972 (age 53); Gothenburg, Sweden
- Occupations: Actress; comedian
- Website: annablomberg.com

Anna Kristina Cecilia Blomberg (born 20 May 1972) is a Swedish actress and comedian. She has appeared in many TV series, among them Häxan Surtant, Kvarteret Skatan (her breakthrough role), and Superhjältejul. In addition, she performs on the stage and radio. In 2009 she participated in SVT's julkalender (Christmas Calendar).

Anna Kristina Cecilia Blomberg was born on 20 May 1972 in Gothenburg.
