= Moodysson =

Moodysson is a surname. Notable people with the surname include:

- Coco Moodysson (born 1970), Swedish cartoonist
- Lukas Moodysson (born 1969), Swedish writer and film director
