= Arlöv Church =

- Arlövs kyrka
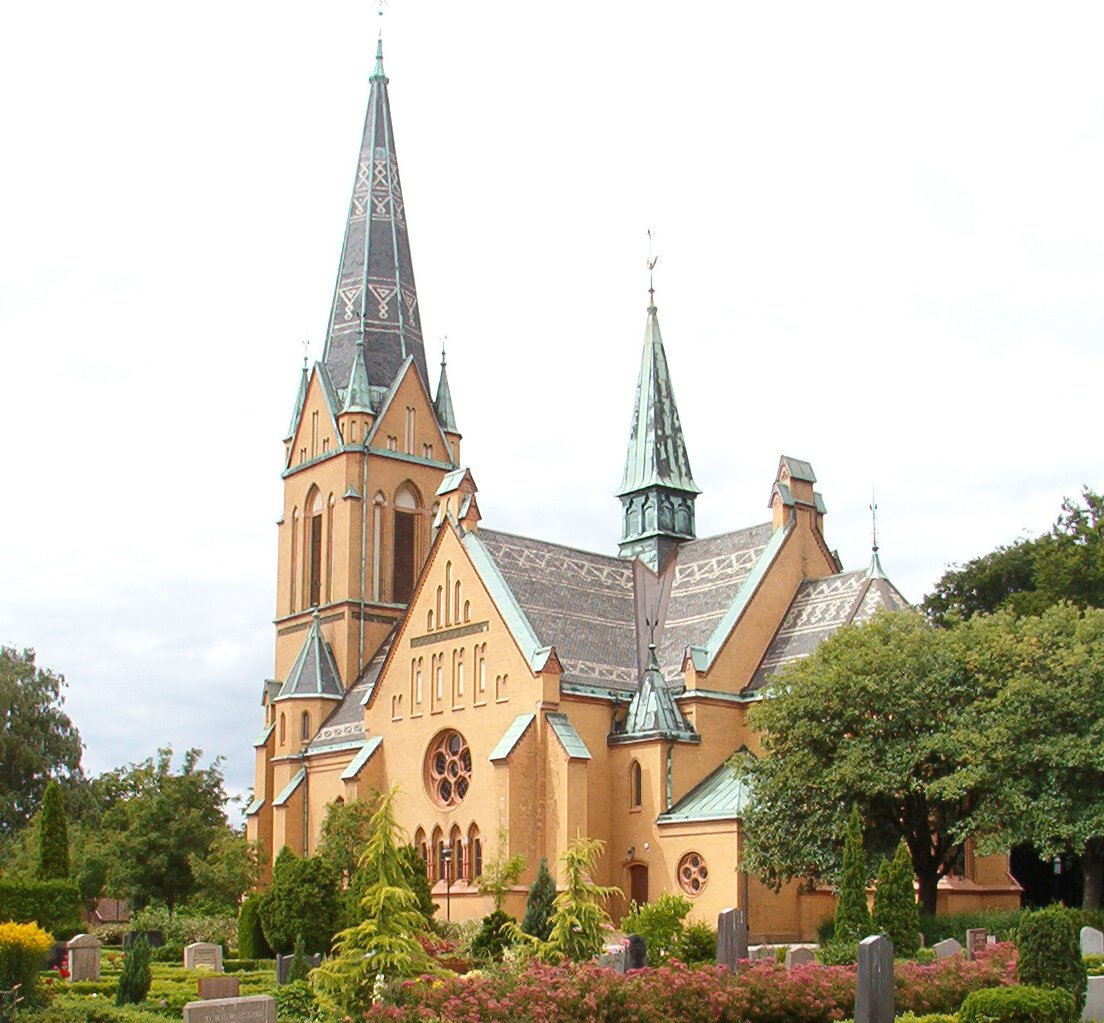
- Arlöv Church

- Location within Skåne Location within Sweden
- 55°38′06″N 13°04′41″E
- Country: Sweden
- Denomination: Church of Sweden

Administration
- Diocese: Lund

Arlöv Church (Swedish: Arlövs kyrka) is a church in Arlöv, Burlöv Municipality in the Swedish province Skåne. The Neo-Gothic church was built in 1900 to house a growing congregation.

== History ==
The church was built in 1900 and was intended to replace Burlöv Old Church, a nearby medieval church which had become too small for the growing congregation. Discussions about building a new church had been initiated already in 1870. When it was inaugurated in 1900, its Neo-Gothic style was already falling out of fashion.

== Architecture ==
The church was designed by architect Alfred Arwidius in a Neo-Gothic style with some details influenced by Art Nouveau. The building material is yellow bricks and the church consists of a western tower, nave, transepts and a pentagonal choir. The church tower is 58 metres (190 ft) tall. Inside, most of the furnishings including the Neo-Gothic altarpiece date from the time of construction. The north transept houses the organ. The altar is from 1963. The architecture has been described as being of high quality for its time and standards.
