= 2000 Palanca Awards =

Philippine literary award

50th Palanca Awards
- Date: September 1, 2000
- Location: The Peninsula Manila, Makati, Philippines

The 50th Don Carlos Palanca Memorial Awards for Literature was held on September 1, 2000, at The Peninsula Manila in Makati to commemorate the memory of Don Carlos Palanca Sr. through an endeavor that would promote education and culture in the country. This year saw the inclusion of a new a new category, Future Fiction, open for short stories that deal with the future of the Philippines or the future of Philippine writing, in English and Filipino.

Roberto T. Añonuevo, Jose Y. Dalisay Jr., and Edgardo B. Maranan were this year's Palanca Hall of Fame awardees. Añonuevo clinched his fifth first prize for “Ang Resureksiyon” under the Sanaysay category. Dalisay clinched his fifth first prize for “The Woman in the Box” under the Short Story category. And Maranan clinched his fifth first prize for “Tabon and Other Poems” under the Poetry category. The award is given to writers who have won five first places in any category.

The 2000 winners are divided into four categories:

== English Division ==
=== Short Story ===
- First Prize: Jose Dalisay, Jr., "The Woman in the Box"
- Second Prize: Isolde Amante, "Dance"
- Third Prize: Faye Ilogon, "Drive"

=== Future Fiction ===
- First Prize: Luis Joaquin Katigbak, "Subterrania"
- Second Prize: Lakambini Sitoy, "Secret Notes on the Dead Stars"
- Third Prize: Adel Gabot, "The Field"

=== Short Story for Children ===
- First Prize: Victoria Estrella C. Bravo, "Fish for Two"
- Second Prize: Mary Agnes Dizon, "The Hare Tells His Story"
- Third Prize: Lakambini Sitoy, "The Night Monkeys"

=== Poetry ===
- First Prize: Edgar Maranan, "Tabon and Other Poems"
- Second Prize: Ramil Digal Gulle, "Afterhours, Afterlives"
- Third Prize: Raymund Magno Garlitos, "The Memory of Skin"

=== Essay ===
- First Prize: Alexis Abola, "Many Mansions"
- Second Prize: Edgar Maranan, "The Way She Was: Memories of Lola Posta's Hundred Years"
- Third Prize: Lourd Ernest de Vera, "The Ghost of Bebop on Bignay Street"

=== One-Act Play ===
- First Prize: No Winner
- Second Prize: Lady Michelle Sering, "The Tuesday Club"
- Third Prize: Elma Famador, "Ghosts Don't Do That or Do They?"

=== Full-Length Play ===
- First Prize: No Winner
- Second Prize: No Winner
- Third Prize: Reme Grefalda, "In the Matter of Willie Grayson"

== Filipino Division ==
=== Maikling Kwento ===
- First Prize: Placido Parcero Jr., "Alyas Juan de La Cruz"
- Second Prize: Norman Wilwayco, "Kung Paano Ko Inayos ang Buhok Ko Matapos ang Mahaba-haba Ring Paglalakbay"
- Third Prize: Fr. Arnel Vitor, "Logos sa Lotus"

=== Future Fiction [Filipino] ===
- First Prize: Johannes Chua, "Kalinangan"
- Second Prize: George de Jesus III, "Cell Phone"
- Third Prize: Alwin Aguirre, "Desaparecidos"

=== Maikling Kwentong Pambata ===
- First Prize: Eugene Evasco, "Hilong Talilong"
- Second Prize: Luis Gatmaitan, "May Mga Lihim Kami ni Ingkong"
- Third Prize: Eleanor Yu, "Kung Bakit Espesyal si Tatay"

=== Tula ===
- First Prize: Eugene Evasco, "Ang Maisisilid sa Pandama"
- Second Prize: Alwynn C. Javier, "Ang Pasipiko sa Loob ng Aking Maleta"
- Third Prize: Rebecca T. Añonuevo, "Batubalani at Iba pang mga Tula"

=== Sanaysay ===
- First Prize: Roberto T. Añonuevo, "Ang Resureksyon"
- Second Prize: Rebecca T. Añonuevo, "Talinhaga ng Gana"
- Third Prize: Eugene Evasco, "Kilometro Zero ni Isang Lagalag na Taong-bahay"

=== Dulang May Isang Yugto ===
- First Prize: George de Jesus III, "Linggo ng Palaspas"
- Second Prize: Reynaldo A. Duque, "Kabsat"
- Third Prize: Allan Lopez, "Anino"

=== Dulang Ganap ang Haba ===
- First Prize: No Winner
- Second Prize: Alfred A. Yuson, "Luto, Linis Laba"
- Third Prize: Dominic D. Manrique, "Me Esep o Wala, Sa Pera'y Lahat Namangha"

=== Dulang Pantelebisyon ===
- First Prize: Aurora Yumul, "Selyo at Kastilyo"
- Second Prize: Lazaro P. Torres Jr., "Gintong Ilawan"
- Third Prize: Leah C. Eriguel, "Ang May Bahay"

=== Dulang Pampelikula ===
- First Prize: Floy Quintos, "Gabi ng Tinggiirin"
- Second Prize: Jose Dennis C. Teodosio, "Sirena"
- Third Prize: Joel V. Almazan, "Ang Bata sa Daan-Pari"

== Regional Division ==
=== Short Story [Cebuano] ===
- First Prize: Arturo G. Penaserada, "Saloma sa Dagat"
- Second Prize: Januar Yap, "Ang Suhito"
- Third Prize: Candido O. Wenceslao, "Ang Mga Langgam-langgam"

=== Short Story [Hiligaynon] ===
- First Prize: Isabel D. Sebullen, "Aswang"
- Second Prize: Nerio E. Jedeliz Jr., "Baha"
- Third Prize: Peter Solis Nery, "Ang Pangayaw"

=== Short Story [Iluko] ===
- First Prize: Jaime M. Agpalo Jr., "Tupa: Ladawan ni Pangalatok Idi Daan a Milenio"
- Second Prize: Maria L.M. Fres-Felix, "Uy-ayam Ti Gubat"
- Third Prize: Reynaldo A. Duque, "Apo Lakay"

== Kabataan Division ==
=== Kabataan Essay ===
- First Prize: Enrico Miguel Subido, "The Hero in My Blood"
- Second Prize: Douglas James L. Candano, "The Pinoy Also Rises"
- Third Prize: Mark Adrian C. Ramirez, "Neither Rizal, Nor Bonifacio"

=== Kabataan Sanaysay ===
- First Prize: Aleksandre Pates, "Yaya"
- Second Prize: Ranjith M. Mendoza, "Kumander Panas: Bayaning Filipino ng Bagong Milenyo"
- Third Prize: Rose Ativo Jabeguero, "Maestra Monica: Bagong Bayaning Angat sa Iba"

== Sources ==
- "The Don Carlos Palanca Memorial Awards for Literature | Winners 2000". Archived from the original on 2009-10-22.
