= Marife Necesito =

Filipino actress

- Born: 1980 (age 44–45); Manila, Philippines
- Occupation(s): Actress film and theater, former prose writer

Marife Necesito is a Filipino actress on stage, film, and television productions. After portraying several obscure roles, she was cast in the 2009 film Mammoth with Mexican actor Gael García Bernal and American actress Michelle Williams.

== Early life and career ==
Necesito was born in Manila and raised in Valenzuela City, a suburb of Metro Manila which at that time was part of Bulacan Province. After finishing high school at St. Jude Academy in Valenzuela's Malinta district, she pursued creative writing for Tagalog komiks and romance novels. When the komiks industry went downhill, she then shifted to acting for theater where she was trained by senior thespians Cecile Guidote-Alvarez and Angie Ferro. Her theatrical stint paved the way for her to act for television commercials and independent films.

== Role in Mammoth ==
In Mammoth, Necesito portrays the role of Gloria, a mother of two sons who leaves the Philippines to work as a nanny of the daughter (Sophie Nyweide) of an American couple played by Gael García Bernal and Michelle Williams. When Bernal's character goes to Thailand for a business trip, he decides to change his life that would set off a chain of events that impact the rest of the family, including Gloria. Necesito bested other local actresses in the auditions, which she revealed took more than a year, including Alessandra de Rossi, Chin Chin Gutierrez, Joyce Jimenez, and Pinky Amador. She said in an interview with Philippine Daily Inquirer that she considers Mammoth as her biggest break so far.

== Filmography ==
=== Film ===
Year	Title	Role
1996	Mumbaki	Village Woman
1998	Sa Pusod ng Dagat	Maya's friend
2001	Going Back	Dong Ha bargirl
2003	Kikay: Kaakit-akit, Kaaya-aya, Kikiligin Ka	
2004	Evolution of a Filipino Family	Gilda
2006	Pandanggo	Aling Espie
2008	Heremias Book Two: The Legend of Tagabulag Island	
2008	Tropical Manila	Kara
2008	Black Market Love	Momma
2009	Mammoth	Gloria
2009	Fidel	Jovi
2009	Pitik Bulag	Merly
2011	Taksikab	Marife
2011	Brod	Mrs Parapara
2011	Lilet Never Happened	
2011	Sponsor	Delia
2011	Linabo	Andrea
2011	Kapatid	Nanay
2012	Mondomanila	
2012	Graceland	Mrs. Marcy Changho
2012	Darkest Night	Agira Espino
2013	Gabriel (Ito ang Kuwento Ko)	
2013	Ang Misis ni Meyor	
2014	Bacao	
2022	Connected	Gabbie's mother
TBA	Kuya: The Governor Edwin Jubahib Story	

=== Television ===
Year	Title	Role
2005	Wag Kukurap	Tess
2010	Tanging Yaman	Brenda
2011	Amaya	Uripon
2016	Be My Lady	Dahlia
2016–2018	Ika-6 na Utos	Yaya Vicky
2018	The Stepdaughters	Diana
2019	Dahil sa Pag-ibig	Aileen
2021	Ang Dalawang Ikaw	A Waitress
2023	Abot-Kamay na Pangarap	A Restaurant Owner
2024	Lilet Matias: Attorney-at-Law	Maya Serrano
