= Kenta (musician) =

Swedish musician

- Kenta (left) with Stoffe (right) in 1968

Background information
- Also known as: Kenta
- Born: Knut Kenneth Gustafsson; 11 August 1948; Nacka, Sweden
- Died: 3 March 2003 (aged 54) Västergötland, Sweden
- Genres: Rock
- Occupation: Musician
- Instruments: Vocals, guitar

Knut Kenneth Gustafsson (11 August 1948 – 3 March 2003), known as Kenta, was a Swedish musician.

Gustafsson was born in Nacka, Sweden. He grew up in Vällingby, a suburb northwest of Stockholm. Early in his life Kenta had problems with alcohol and drug addictions, which was the subject for the three documentaries by Stefan Jarl known as The Mod Trilogy. He competed in Melodifestivalen, the Swedish qualifying round for the Eurovision Song Contest in 1980 with the song "Utan att fråga", finishing sixth place. His biggest hit was "Just idag är jag stark" a song about feeling strong after struggling with addiction. He was known as a supporter of the Swedish football team Hammarby IF who adopted Just idag är jag stark as their anthem.

Gustafsson died of cancer in March 2003 after having been treated at the home of Stefan Jarl and his family in Västergötland. He was buried in the memorial garden at the Solna cemetery.

== Selected filmography ==
- 1968 – They Call Us Misfits
- 1979 – A Respectable Life
- 1993 – From Misfits To Yuppies

== Musical arrangements ==
- 1993 – Det sociala arvet

== Discography ==
- 1979 – Kenta
- 1981 – Kan det va' fel på systemet?
- 1981 – August & Kenta LP
- 2000 – Kenta: Guldkorn 1979–81
- 2003 – På nattlig vandring
