= A Respectable Life =

- Directed by: Stefan Jarl
- Screenplay by: Stefan Jarl
- Produced by: Stefan Jarl
- Starring: Kenneth Gustafsson Gustav "Stoffe" Svensson
- Cinematography: Per Källberg
- Music by: Ulf Dageby
- Release date: 26 March 1979 (Sweden)
- Running time: 102 minutes
- Country: Sweden
- Language: Swedish

A Respectable Life (Swedish: Ett anständigt liv) is a 1979 Swedish documentary film directed by Stefan Jarl. The film is the second of the Mods Trilogy by Jarl. At the 15th Guldbagge Awards the film won the awards for Best Film and Best Director. It was also selected as the Swedish entry for the Best Foreign Language Film at the 52nd Academy Awards, but was not accepted as a nominee.

== Synopsis ==
A decade has gone by and the spirit of the preceding film, Dom kallar oss mods, has disappeared. Kenta is an alcoholic and lives with his girlfriend, Eva. Together they have a son, Patric. Kenta's mom is in jail for manslaughter and Kenta goes to Hinseberg prison to greet her. Heroin also comes to play and Stoffe is one of those who falls victim to it. He lives with his girlfriend Lena and their young son, Janne. Lena later throws Stoffe out of their home when she gets enough of his abuse, and he is forced to live with his mother. Kenta calls Stoffe and decides to meet him, and he tries to persuade him to give up heroin, but the two have a falling out and they separate. This film features other users from the previous film, such as Jajje and Kenta Bergkvist. The film ends with the death of a prominent person in the trilogy.

== Release ==
The film was released to cinemas in Sweden on 26 March 1979.

== See also ==
- List of submissions to the 52nd Academy Awards for Best Foreign Language Film
- List of Swedish submissions for the Academy Award for Best Foreign Language Film
