= They Call Us Misfits =

- Swedish theatrical poster
- Directed by: Stefan Jarl; Jan Lindkvist
- Written by: Stefan Jarl; Jan Lindkvist
- Produced by: Stefan Jarl; Jan Lindkvist
- Starring: Kenneth Gustafsson; Gustav "Stoffe" Svensson
- Narrated by: Stefan Jarl
- Cinematography: Jan Lindkvist
- Edited by: Stefan Jarl; Jan Lindkvist
- Music by: Hawkey Franzén; Chris White (song)
- Distributed by: Pallas Film AB
- Release date: 25 March 1968 (Sweden)
- Running time: 100 minutes
- Country: Sweden
- Language: Swedish
- Budget: 75,000 SEK

They Call Us Misfits (Swedish: Dom kallar oss mods) is a 1968 Swedish documentary film directed, produced and written by Stefan Jarl and Jan Lindqvist. The film is an uncompromising account of the life of two alienated teenagers, Kenneth "Kenta" Gustafsson (1948–2003) and Gustav "Stoffe" Svensson (1950–1978). The film, like its successor Ett anständigt liv (1979; A Respectable Life) takes a close but non-moralizing look at the joys and growing pains of mod and "junkie" street culture in Stockholm at the time.

== Synopsis ==
The film begins with an interview with Tompa, a friend of Kenta and Stoffe. He tells how he grew up in orphanages and juvenile prisons. He says that freedom hardly exists for him, but one thing he is sure of is that the time he spent with Kenta and Stoffe and the other mods was the most enjoyable time of his life. The interview cuts to Kenta and Stoffe running through the streets of Stockholm filmed with a fisheye lens. Later, we see them walking around at the subway station T-Centralen in Stockholm. They meet friends and go around begging people for food, beer and cigarettes. The workers who are passing by are ridiculed by Kenta and Stoffe.

Another friend of the guys, Jojje, talks about how alcohol will destroy them in time, but that he doesn't worry much about it right now. The filmmakers have fixed a small apartment for Kenta and Stoffe which is a big difference for the guys who previously slept outdoors or in the apartments of others. Kenta and Stoffe talk about their childhood. Stoffe's father drank himself broke and died in a hospital. Kenta's father tried to strangle him with a tie. Stoffe also remembers that he thought it was fun to play at home when he was little. We see the two guys go to "4:an", a club for young people. Stoffe likes to be with many girls, but tells Eva, who he sleeps with, that he wants her for himself. Kenta and Stoffe deliver a musical performance, where they play "Leave Me Be" by The Zombies.

It is now winter and a trip to Hedemora in Dalarna is taken accompanied by Hasse. They plan to visit Stoffe's childhood friend Ingmar. On the train, they drink beer, smoke pot and make jokes. The mood is high, but they decide they can't stay in Hedemora—the contrast from the big city of Stockholm is too great. Stoffe thinks nothing happens in Hedemora.

In Stockholm, there is Peter, who earns 400 kronor a day by selling drugs, and Lunkan, who got hepatitis from an infected hypodermic syringe. It is summer and Kenta and Stoffe are not working and have nowhere to live. Their friendship is being worn down. Kenta doesn't think Stoffe is a good friend anymore since he started seeing Eva. One night, the guys go searching for empty stairwells to stay in, but they start arguing and Stoffe leaves. Kenta finds an empty stairwell and lays himself down, opens up a beer and starts reading a cartoon magazine. The same night, Stoffe is taken in by the police.

== Music ==
- "Fisheye" by Lea Riders Group
- "Leave Me Be" by Chris White
- "Den glade bagarn i San Remo" by Evert Taube
- "Dom kallar oss mods" by Lea Riders Group

== Reception ==
The film was released to cinemas in Sweden on 25 March 1968.

In Stockholm newspapers, the film received generally good reviews. It expressed solidarity with the project itself, which meant that the writers basically took away from a formal and aesthetic value of the film. In the Swedish newspaper Svenska Dagbladet, Carl Henry Svenstedt said: "A more conventional critique would seem cynical, about a problem whose solution we all have responsibility for." What Kenta and Stoffe thought about the movie was never revealed, as they were arrested at the premiere for causing a commotion.

Movie Facts and Feats: A Guinness Record Book refers to this film as the first to depict unsimulated sexual intercourse.
