= Fidel (2009 film) =

Filipino film by Mark Shandii Bacolod

- Directed by: Mark Shandii Bacolod
- Written by: Charlotte Dianco
- Produced by: Charlotte Dianco
- Starring: Lance Raymundo; Snooky Serna; Marife Necesito; Maria Isabel Lopez; Andrea Del Rosario; Von Arroyo; Fonz Deza; Cherry Mae Canton; Rj Revilla
- Cinematography: Rain Yamson II
- Edited by: Gino Montalvo
- Release date: August 28, 2009
- Country: Philippines
- Language: Filipino

Fidel is a 2009 Filipino indie film, directed by Mark Shandii Bacolod and produced and written by Charlotte Dianco.

The film tells the story of a character named Fidel, an Overseas Filipino Worker (OFW) working at Dubai, who is on death row for killing his Arab male employer for raping him. It was reported that the film was originally made to create awareness for Filipino men who have been abused but are embarrassed to file an action against the perpetrators.

== Plot ==
An overseas Filipino worker is on death row in Dubai for killing his Arab male employer for raping him. As the news progressed in the Philippines, a female reporter named Vega starts digging up stories about him, and that in turn garnered attention from local government officials to take action. But for Fidel, he doesn't want any help, as he has insisted that he purposely killed his employer, however Vega finds this hard to believe as she investigates his past of a loving boy-next-door type who has a loving family and that his profile doesn't fit the picture of a killer. Sister Lourdes, a Filipino nun who is based in Dubai and visits Fidel regularly in jail also wants to know the truth.

== Cast ==
- Lance Raymundo as Fidel
- Snooky Serna as Sister Lourdes
- Marife Necesito as Jovi
- Maria Isabel Lopez as Minda
- Andrea del Rosario as Vega
- Von Arroyo as Chris
- Fonz Deza as Poldo
- Cherry Mae Canton as Daisy
- RJ Revilla as Milo
- Ana Abad-Santos as a Malacanang Representative
- Ces Aldaba as a Politician
- Bong Cabrera
- Justin De Leon as Ramon
- Martin Dela Paz as Caleb
- Nonoy Froilan as Father Allan
- Jerald Guevara as Adi
- Jon Hall as Al-Jared Ahmed
- R.R. Herrera as Human Rights Lawyer
- P.J. Lanot as a DFA Official
- Jao Mapa as Goonie
- Alex Vincent Medina as Fidel's friend
- IC Mendoza as Boy George
- Mosang as Ditas
- Jonathan Neri as Fidel's friend
- Roeder as Peter

== Special screenings ==
- The film was a semi-finalist at the 2007 Cinemalaya Independent Film Festival.
- The film was first screened at the Armed Forces of the Philippines (AFP) Theater last Aug. 28, 2009.
- The film was the official selection at the first Filipino International Film Festival in Los Angeles (FIFFLA).
- It was also featured at the IndieSine in Robinson Galleria last Jan. 17, 2010, where only indie film are shown.
