= Mark Shandii Bacolod =

Filipino film director and producer (1984–2022)

- Born: September 17, 1984; Masbate, Philippines
- Died: June 8, 2022 (aged 37); Bangkok, Thailand
- Occupations: Film producer; director; talent manager; events director

Mark Shandii Bacolod (September 17, 1984 – June 8, 2022) was a Filipino director, producer, and talent manager. He has directed the films: Ben & Sam, Fidel, and the short film 5 Minutes.

Aside from directing and producing independent films, Bacolod also ventured into talent and event management. He managed indie actress Mercedes Cabral.

== Filmography ==
=== Films ===
Year	Title	Role
2019	Culion	Producer
2010	Ben & Sam	Director
2010	Detektib	Producer
2010	Pendong	Executive Producer
2010	Sponsor	Director
2009	Fidel	Director

=== Music videos ===
Year	Title	Artist
2012	Isa Pa Nga	Mocha Girls
