= Lukas Moodysson =

Swedish writer and film director

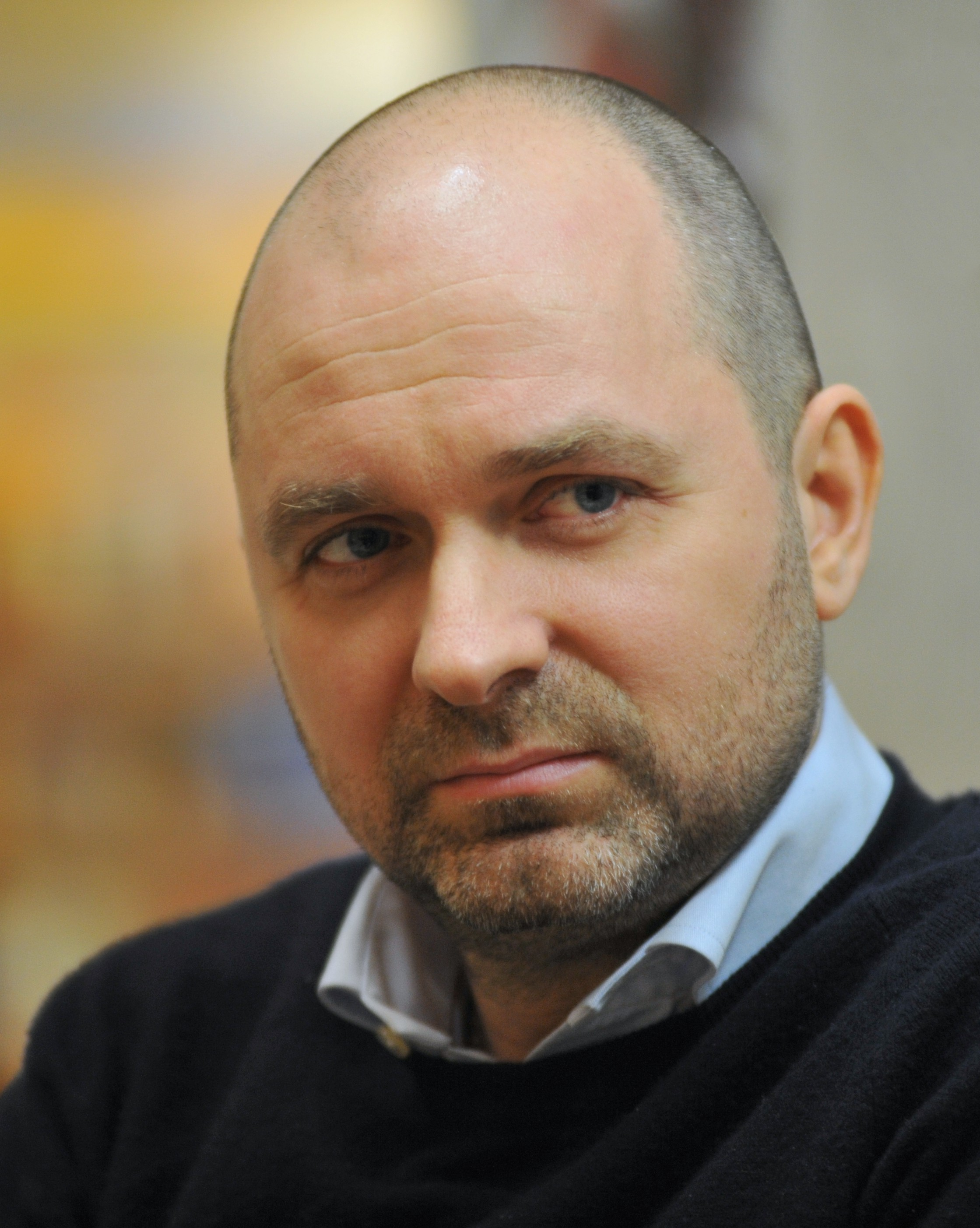
- Moodysson in 2011
- Born: 17 January 1969 (age 57); Lund, Sweden
- Occupations: Filmmaker; writer
- Years active: 1998–present
- Spouse: Coco Moodysson (m. 1994)
- Children: 3

Karl Fredrik Lukas Moodysson (Swedish pronunciation: [ˈlʉ̌ːkas ˈmɔ̂dːʏˌsɔn]; born 17 January 1969) is a Swedish filmmaker, novelist, and short story writer. First coming to prominence as an ambitious poet in the 1980s, he had his big domestic and international breakthrough directing the 1998 romantic film Show Me Love. He has since directed a string of films with different styles and public appeal, as well as continued to write both poetry and novels. In 2007, The Guardian ranked Moodysson eleventh in its list of the world’s best directors, describing his directorial style as “heartfelt and uncompromising.”

== Early life ==
Born in Lund, Moodysson grew up in Åkarp, Skåne County as an outcast, expressing himself through poetry. By the time he was 23 he had written five poetry collections and a novel published by Wahlström & Widstrand. He decided to move to film to produce works that were less introverted and could be enjoyed by a wider audience than poetry. After studying at what was then Sweden's only film school, the Dramatiska Institutet, he directed three short films before moving to features.

== Filmmaking ==
Moodysson's directorial breakthrough came with Fucking Åmål (retitled Show Me Love in English-speaking countries). A classical love story, filmed in a highly naturalistic, almost documentary style, it is set in the small and boring Swedish town of Åmål, and follows two girls who awkwardly fall in love. The film was a huge success with the Swedish public and critics. It won four Guldbagge Awards, including best film, best actress (shared by the two girls Rebecka Liljeberg and Alexandra Dahlström), best direction and best script. It was a colossal hit in Sweden.

His next film, 2000's Together (Tillsammans), followed the antics of life in a commune in suburban Stockholm in the 1970s. It achieved a sense of the era through extensive use of period Swedish progg and pop songs, including ABBA's hit "SOS."

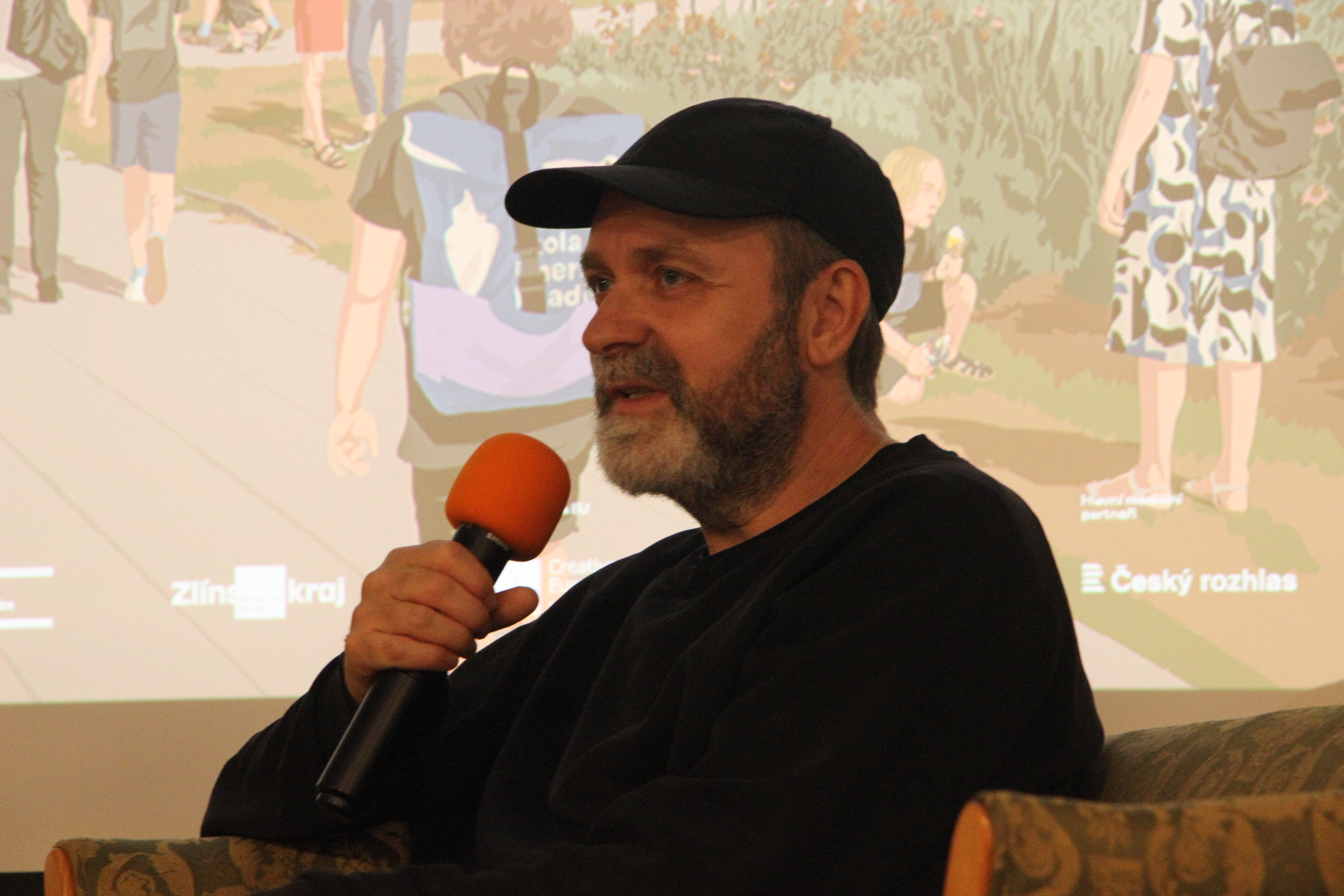
Lukas Moodysson at Summer Film School festival in 2025

Moodysson followed up these two sunny, cheerfully optimistic films with the brutal Lilya 4-ever in 2002, included in many American critics' top ten lists the following year. The mainly Russian language film follows a girl living in an unspecified country in the former Soviet Union (filmed in Estonia) as she is abandoned by her mother, drops out of school, is forced into prostitution, and then is kidnapped into sex slavery. Moodysson has said he could not have made the film without his strong Christian beliefs. The frequent religious fantasies that Lilja has are the only tender spots in the bleak world Moodysson presents. At the time of its release, critic Dave Kehr of The New York Times declared Moodysson to be "Sweden's most praised filmmaker since Ingmar Bergman".

His 2004 film, the controversial A Hole in My Heart (Ett hål i mitt hjärta) is more an experimental film than a traditional narrative. He has said it is intentionally designed to be off-putting to the audience. It intersperses frequent screeching noises, close-ups of female genital surgery, and other jarring elements into a vague plot about two pornographers shooting their latest video in a filthy apartment, with an attention-craving porn starlet, while the webbed-handed son of one of the men stays holed up in his bedroom. It received a special certificate for shocking images in Sweden and received terrible reviews from the vast majority of critics.

He followed this with another even more experimental film, 2006's Container, featuring narration by actress Jena Malone. The only sound in the movie is a stream of consciousness narrative, which is only loosely related to the visual content.

Moodysson's work took a new turn with Mammoth, released 23 January 2009. Unlike his previous two efforts, it is a narrative film and his first English-language piece, about a successful New York couple, their daughter and her Filipino nanny.

His 2013 film We are the Best! (Vi är bäst!), based on the comic book Aldrig Godnatt by his wife Coco Moodysson, returns to the themes and style of Show Me Love and Together, set in 1982 and following the exploits of a teenage three-piece girl punk-band.

All of Moodysson's feature films have been produced, or co-produced, by Memfis Film, a small Swedish production company based in Stockholm. Memfis' CEO and producer Lars Jönsson seeks to establish long-term working relationships with directors and support even less commercially oriented projects such as Moodysson's A Hole in My Heart and Container.

2019 saw the premiere of the TV series Gösta, Moodysson's first foray into television and HBO's first commissioned drama series out of Scandinavia.

Moodysson's Together 99, a sequel to Together, was released in 2023. Set in 1999, it follows Göran and Klas as they establish a new commune. Most of the actors returned, with the exception of the children, Michael Nyqvist (who died in 2017), and Ola Rapace, whose role of Lasse was recast with actor Jonas Karlsson.

== Personal life ==
Moodysson is an outspoken advocate of left-wing and feminist politics, and a deeply committed Christian. He lives in Malmö with his wife, artist Coco Moodysson. They have three children.

== Filmography ==
- Det var en mörk och stormig natt — 1995
- En uppgörelse i den undre världen — 1996
- Talk (Bara prata lite) — 1997
- Show Me Love (Fucking Åmål) — 1998
- Together (Tillsammans) — 2000
- The New Country (Det nya landet) — 2000
- Lilya 4-ever — 2002
- Terrorists: The Kids They Sentenced (Terrorister - en film om dom dömda) — 2003
- A Hole in My Heart (Ett hål i mitt hjärta) — 2004
- Container — 2006
- Mammoth (Mammut) — 2009
- We Are the Best! (Vi är bäst!) — 2013
- Gösta — TV series, 2019
- Together 99 (Tillsammans 99) — 2023

== Bibliography ==
- Det spelar ingen roll var blixtarna slår ner (1987) - poems
- Och andra dikter (1988) - poems
- Evangelium enligt Lukas Moodysson (1989) - poems
- Vitt blod (1990) - novel
- Kött (1991) - poems
- Souvenir (1996) - poems
- Mellan sexton och tjugosex (2001) - selected works
- Vad gör jag här (2002) - long poem
- Vårdcentralen Fontanellen (2005) (with Coco Moodysson) - comic book
- Apo kryp hos (2006) - poems
- Container (2009) - screenplay and documentation
- Döden & Co. (2011) - novel
- Tolv månader i skugga (2012) - novel
- Rebellerna (2026) - novel

== Awards and honors ==
- 1999: Teddy Award for Best Feature Film – Fucking Åmål
- 2000: Gijón International Film Festival: Best Director – Together. Best Script – Together. Young Jury Prize for Best Feature Film – Together.
- 2002: Gijón International Film Festival: Best Feature Film – Lilya 4-ever. Young Jury Prize for Best Feature Film – Lilya 4-ever.
- 2003: Stig Dagerman Prize
