= Lea Riders Group =

Swedish rock band

- Origin: Borgholm, Sweden
- Genres: Rock, psychedelic rock, blues, R&B, garage rock
- Years active: 1961-1968
- Labels: Philips, Garage Land Records
- Past members: Hawkey Franzén Lars Prim; Olof Svensson; Lars "Yancey" Nilsson; Åke "Buddy" Johansson; Alf Sandher; Åka "Ake" Engström; Tommy "Slim" Borgudd; Sigge Ehlin; Leif Alverstam; Bo Häggström Bonnie Zetterberg

Lea Riders Group was a Swedish band with roots in Borgholm, Sweden.

The band formed in 1961 when Hawkey Franzén started the Red River Band, a trio consisting of a drummer, accordionist and trumpet player, along with two of his friends. Additional members were added and after 1963, the Red River Band changed its name to Lea Riders Group. Many members came and went but founder and frontman Hawkey Franzén was the constant member in the band's lineup. After playing in schools and party places on the island of Öland, in Kalmar, the rest of Småland, Blekinge and Östergötland, the band got an opportunity to play in Stockholm in 1966. There they quickly built a name among students and youth, and the group became a popular indie band before the term had even been coined. Their first television appearance was in autumn 1966, when a live performance directed by Stefan Jarl and Jan Lindqvist was shown on SVT. A number of singles were recorded and released by Philips Records. It would once again collaborate with Jarl and Lindqvist when Lea Riders Group got to record some of the soundtrack to the film Dom Kallar Oss Mods. ("They Call Us Misfits" in English). Jarl and Lindqvist's choices for recording the soundtrack was between Lea Riders Group and a similar band called Baby Grandmothers. However the main theme was written and recorded by Lee Riders group that later was appearing on lists all around Europe.

In the middle of 1968, most of the members deemed that gigs and jams were not going to move the band forward, and Franzén dissolved the group in May of that year. The band Made in Sweden was formed from the remnants of Lea Riders Group by Bo Häggström and Slim Borgudd.

== Music ==
The Lea Rider Group's original instruments were replaced rather quickly to the more typical guitar, bass guitar, drums, piano/keyboards and harmonica. Despite this change, the band still occasionally played the accordion as the unusual instrument was well-liked by Franzén. The band had a broad song catalog and mixed many different styles of music during its relatively short career. They became famous in Sweden and abroad, as a "raw, gritty and authentic blues and R&B group" in the style of similar blues-oriented British Invasion bands and American garage bands such as The Chocolate Watchband. The band's music also had psychedelic elements, pop influences and more melodic pieces.

== Discography ==
Lea Riders Group never released any studio albums during the group's active years. The group's live radio recordings, however, were saved and an LP of live material and studio recordings were issued in 1989 on the small record label Garageland Records. The same material was released on CD in 1998.

=== Singles ===
- "Lost Love" / "Tryin" (1966)
- "Got No Woman" / "But I Am, and Who Cares?" (1966)
- "The Situation's Rare" / "Key To The Riddle" (1967)
- "Is it Not Strange?" / "Beloved Baby" (1967)
- "The Forgotten Generation" / "Dom Kallar Oss Mods" ("They Call Us Misfits") (1968)

=== Albums ===
- Lea Riders Group - The Forgotten Generation (LP 1989, CD 1998)
