= Kal P. Dal =

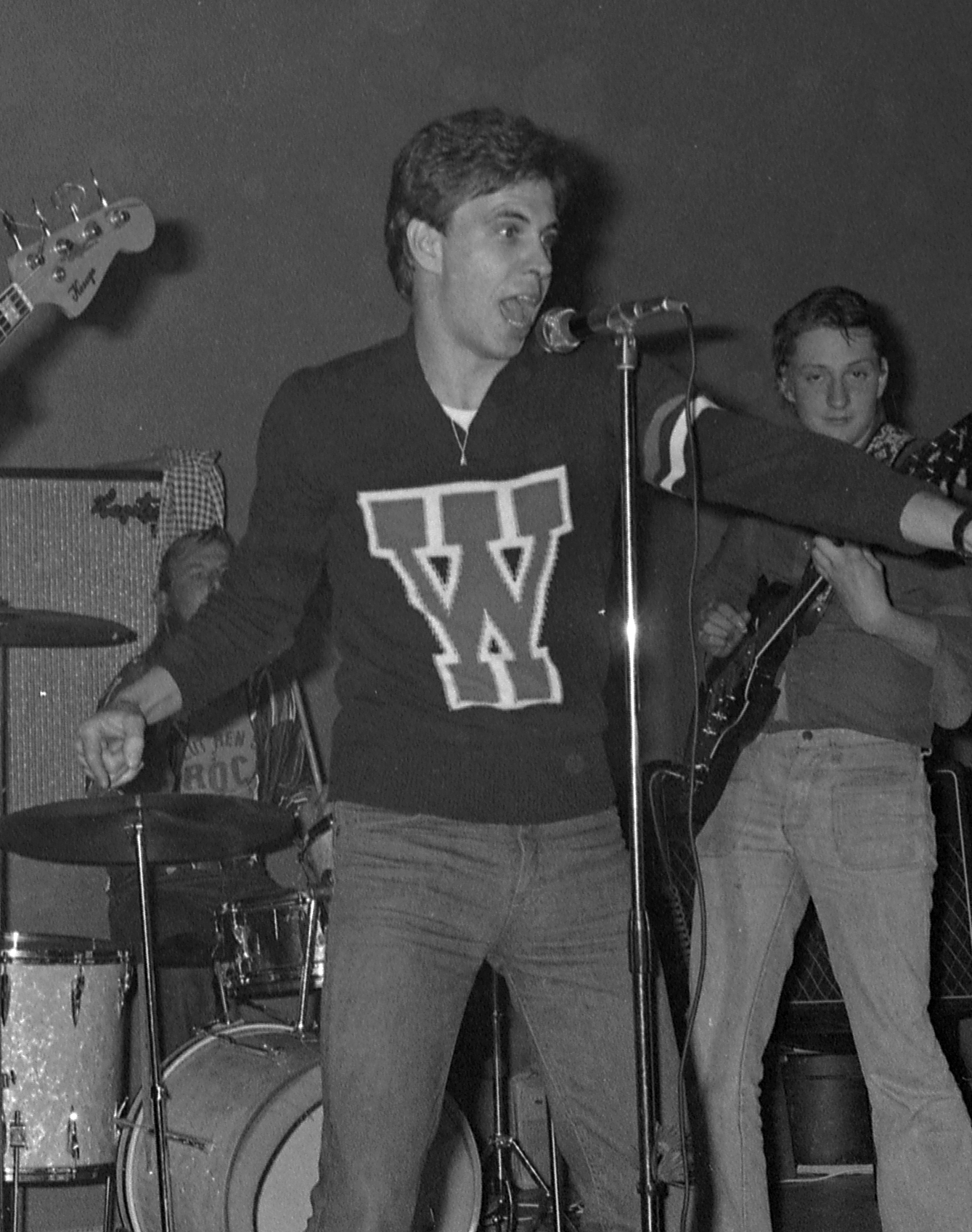
- Kal P. Dal in 1976

Background information
- Birth name: Carl Sven-Göran Ljunggren
- Born: January 28, 1949
- Origin: Arlöv, Scania, Sweden
- Died: January 18, 1985 (aged 35)
- Genres: Rock and roll
- Occupation(s): Singer, songwriter, guitarist, radio DJ
- Instrument(s): Guitar, singing
- Years active: late 1960s–ca 1984
- Labels: Sonet

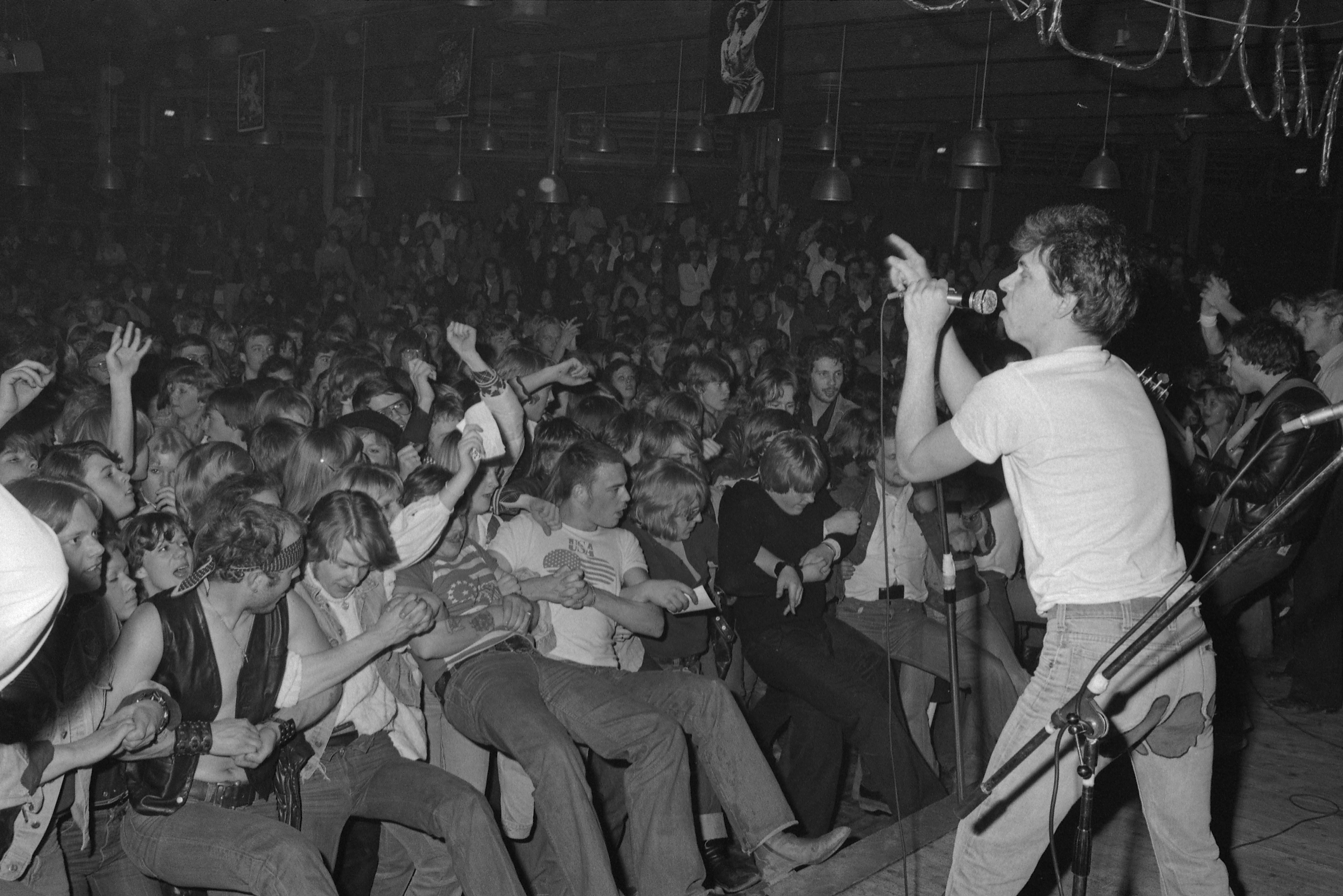
Kal P. Dal during a live concert in Lund, 1977.

Carl Sven-Göran Ljunggren (28 January 1949, Arlöv – 18 January 1985), known by his stage name Kal P. Dal, was a rock musician from Arlöv in Scania (in Sweden). His most famous hit was the song "Blåa Sko'" ("Blue Shoes" in the Scanian dialect). Other hits were "Jonnie", "Bara Rock 'N' Roll" (a Scanian version of "It's Only Rock 'n' Roll), "Raka rör" and "Om ja' va' en slashas/Jag vill leva fri" (a version of "If I Were a Carpenter"). His debut album "Till Mossan!" ("To Mom!") peaked at number 7 on the Swedish album charts where it stayed for 14 weeks.

== Career ==
He played at concerts at Akademiska Föreningen (The Academic Society) in Lund. It was there he met fellow Scanian and musician Peps Persson who convinced Sonet Records to release his music. His debut album "Till Mossan!" ("To Mom!", 1977) peaked at number 7 on the Swedish album charts where it stayed for 14 weeks. Later albums also charted, but didn't reach the same success.

He also had a small part in the film Barnförbjudet (1979)

== Death and legacy ==
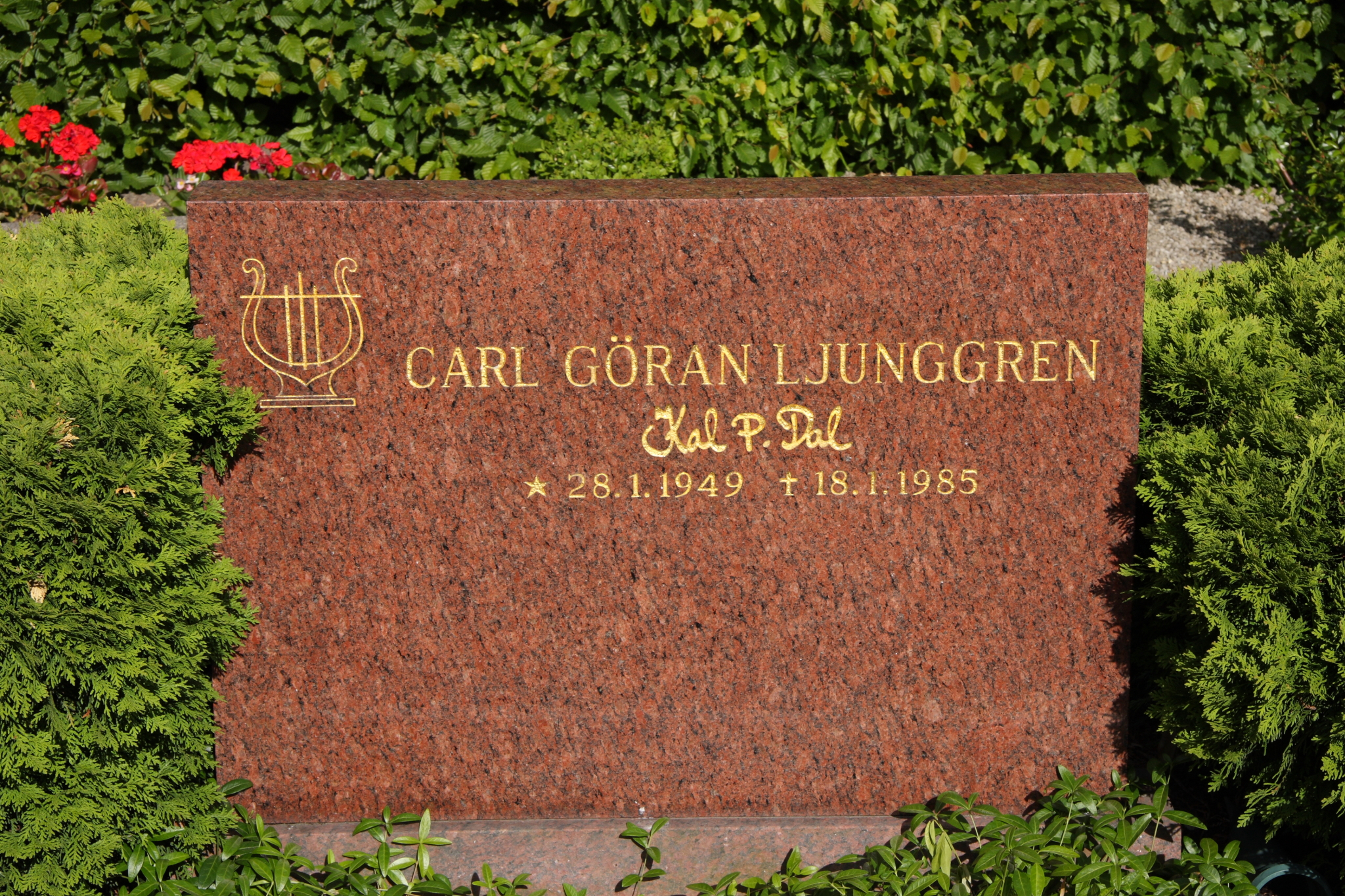
Carl Göran Ljunggren's (Kal P. Dal's) tombstone in Lund

He died on January 18, 1985, from a cerebral haemorrhage.

After his death he got one of the local Pågatåg trains named after him. All of the Pågatåg trains are named after famous people from Scania. In 2005 he also got a street in his home town Arlöv named after him. It was originally suggested that he would get a statue instead, and there is a Facebook group with thousands of members dedicated to making the statue a reality.

Pascal, a rock band from Gotland, Sweden, made a cover of the song "Jonnie". The well-known Swedish indie rock band Bob Hund have cited Kal P. Dal as an inspiration.

== Covers (with new Swedish lyrics) ==
- "17 år" (The Beatles' "I Saw Her Standing There")
- "Bara rock 'n' roll" (The Rolling Stones' "It's Only Rock 'n' Roll (But I Like It)")
- "Brunt socker" (The Rolling Stones' "Brown Sugar")
- "Du bara bankar" (Little Richard's "Keep A-Knockin'")
- "Houndans kvinna II" (The Rolling Stones' "Honky Tonk Women")
- "Ja' kan li en regnig kväll" (Eddie Rabbitt's "I Love a Rainy Night")
- "Jenny Jenny" (Eddie Cochran's "Jeanie, Jeanie, Jeanie")
- "John Silver" (Chuck Berry's "Johnny B. Goode")
- "Jonnie" (10cc's "Johnny, Don't Do It")
- "Kaddilack" (Vince Taylor's "Brand New Cadillac")
- "Karolin" (Status Quo's "Caroline")
- "Knabbar på himelens dörr" (Bob Dylan's "Knockin' on Heaven's Door")
- "Kungens knall" (Bachman-Turner Overdrive's "You Ain't Seen Nothing Yet")
- "Om ja' va' en slashas / Jag vill leva fri" (Tim Hardin's "If I Were a Carpenter")
- "Rock påg" (Thin Lizzy's "The Rocker")
- "Rosalie, Rosalie" (Bob Seger's "Rosalie")
- "Skit i maj" (Rory Gallagher's "Shadow Play")
- "Starta mej" (The Rolling Stones' "Start Me Up")
- "Tutti-Frutti" (Little Richard's "Tutti-Frutti")
- "Ålrajt / Rocka maj" (Free's "All Right Now")
