= Mammoth (2009 film) =

2009 film directed by Lukas Moodysson

- Swedish Blu-ray Cover Art
- Directed by: Lukas Moodysson
- Written by: Lukas Moodysson
- Produced by: Lars Jönsson
- Starring: Gael García Bernal; Michelle Williams; Marife Necesito
- Cinematography: Marcel Zyskind
- Edited by: Michal Leszczylowski
- Music by: Jesper Kurlandsky; Erik Holmquist; Linus Giertta
- Production companies: Zentropa; Memfis Film
- Distributed by: Sonet Film
- Release dates: 23 January 2009 (Sweden); 20 November 2009 (United States)
- Running time: 125 minutes
- Countries: Sweden; Denmark; Germany
- Languages: English; Tagalog; Thai
- Budget: $10 million

Mammoth (Swedish: Mammut) is a 2009 Swedish English-language romantic drama film directed by Lukas Moodysson, about a successful New York couple experiencing conditions related to modern day globalization. The couple is played by Gael García Bernal and Michelle Williams, in the roles of Leo and Ellen Vidales. The title superficially refers to the mammoth ivory pen Leo receives as a gift. In addition it relates loosely to a quote from one of Moodysson's poetry collections: "Our Savior buried like a Mammoth."

== Plot ==
Leo and Ellen are a successful New York couple, totally immersed in their work. Leo is the creator of a booming gaming website and has stumbled into a world of money and big decisions. He has to board a business flight to Thailand in order to sign a contract. What ensues in the next few days is a critique on the social dilemmas that result from globalization.

Ellen is a dedicated emergency surgeon who devotes her long shifts to saving lives. During her work, she becomes attached to a dying boy who has been stabbed in the stomach by his mother. Leo and Ellen have a seven-year-old daughter named Jackie. Due to her parents' absence in the household, she spends most of her time with her Filipino nanny, Gloria, who introduces the girl to her Filipino culture and reads about Jackie's favorite subject, astronomy. Even with the little time that Ellen has for her, Jackie often prefers to be with Gloria, which provokes jealousy on Ellen's part.

Gloria has two children of her own, young boys residing in the Philippines with their grandmother. The older boy, Salvador, who misses his mother dearly, makes frequent phone calls to her and begs her to come home. His grandmother scolds him for calling his mother so much; she urges her daughter to stay in America to make money for a better life for her family. Salvador tries to find a job so that Gloria does not have to work abroad. One night Salvador is robbed by homeless children then lured and molested by a pedophile who saves him from his attackers. The next morning he is found unconscious under a bridge and is rushed to a hospital. When Gloria is informed of this incident she quits her job immediately and goes to the airport to return to her country.

In Bangkok, Leo finds out that his colleague has to spend additional time in negotiations, which creates time for him to travel in Thailand. At a club, Leo meets a prostitute named Cookie and pays her to not have sex with any client that evening. Later on Leo reluctantly has a romantic fling with the girl but regrets it afterwards. He has his colleague accept the terms offered so that he can finish the work and return to his family in the US as soon as possible. We find out at the end that Cookie is a working class single mother who is also living apart from her baby girl.

== Cast ==
The cast includes:

- Gael García Bernal as Leo Vidales
- Michelle Williams as Ellen Vidales
- Marife Necesito as Gloria
- Sophie Nyweide as Jackie Vidales
- Thomas McCarthy as Robert "Bob" Sanders
- Run Srinikornchot as Cookie
- Jan Nicdao as Salvador
- Martin Delos Santos as Manuel
- Maria del Carmen as Grandmother
- Perry Dizon as Uncle Fernando
- Joseph Mydell as Ben Jackson
- Doña Croll as Alice
- Caesar Kobb as Anthony
- Matthew James Ryder as Bob Sander's colleague
- Piromya Sootrak as Cookie's daughter
- Pasakorn Mahakanok as Pom
- Thanita Nitna-na-nan as Pim

== Release ==
On 23 January 2009 the film premiered in Swedish theatres. The international debut followed on 6 February at the Berlin International Film Festival, where the audience showed loud dissatisfaction with the film. It was released in the United States on 20 November 2009 in a theatrical run exclusive to the IFC Center in New York City.

== Reception ==
The film was attacked in Swedish media for what has been perceived as misogyny. "Working women lead to unfaithful men and dead children at home as well as at work," journalist Per Gudmundson summarised his interpretation of the film's message in Svenska Dagbladet. Moodysson would later respond that "They assumed I was trying to say that mothers should stay at home. That was never on my mind.", declaring that the theme of the film was the shared difficulties of characters of very different social backgrounds in coping with both work and spending proper time with their children.

Roger Ebert of the Chicago Sun-Times found both positive and negative aspects in the film, commenting the character of the nanny who has left her family for work in the United States: "The film intends to make us feel guilty that such people care for us and not for their own. I don't buy that." Ebert particularly praised Michelle Williams' performance, being impressed by her ability to convincingly play completely different kinds of roles: "Wendy and Lucy was so effective as establishing her as a helpless innocent that it's sort of a shock to see her here as a cool, competent ER surgeon." Eventually he summarised: "Mammoth is a perfectly decent film. Too bad it isn't more thoughtful. It's easy to regret misfortune if all you do is regret it."

On the review aggregator website Rotten Tomatoes, 42% of 45 critics' reviews are positive, with an average rating of 5.2/10. The website's consensus reads: "While it features a sterling cast, Mammoth's elephantine scope is too sprawling for it to maintain dramatic focus." Metacritic, which uses a weighted average, assigned the film a score of 51 out of 100, based on 12 critics, indicating "mixed or average" reviews.
