= Arlöv =

Seat of the Malmö Municipality in Sweden

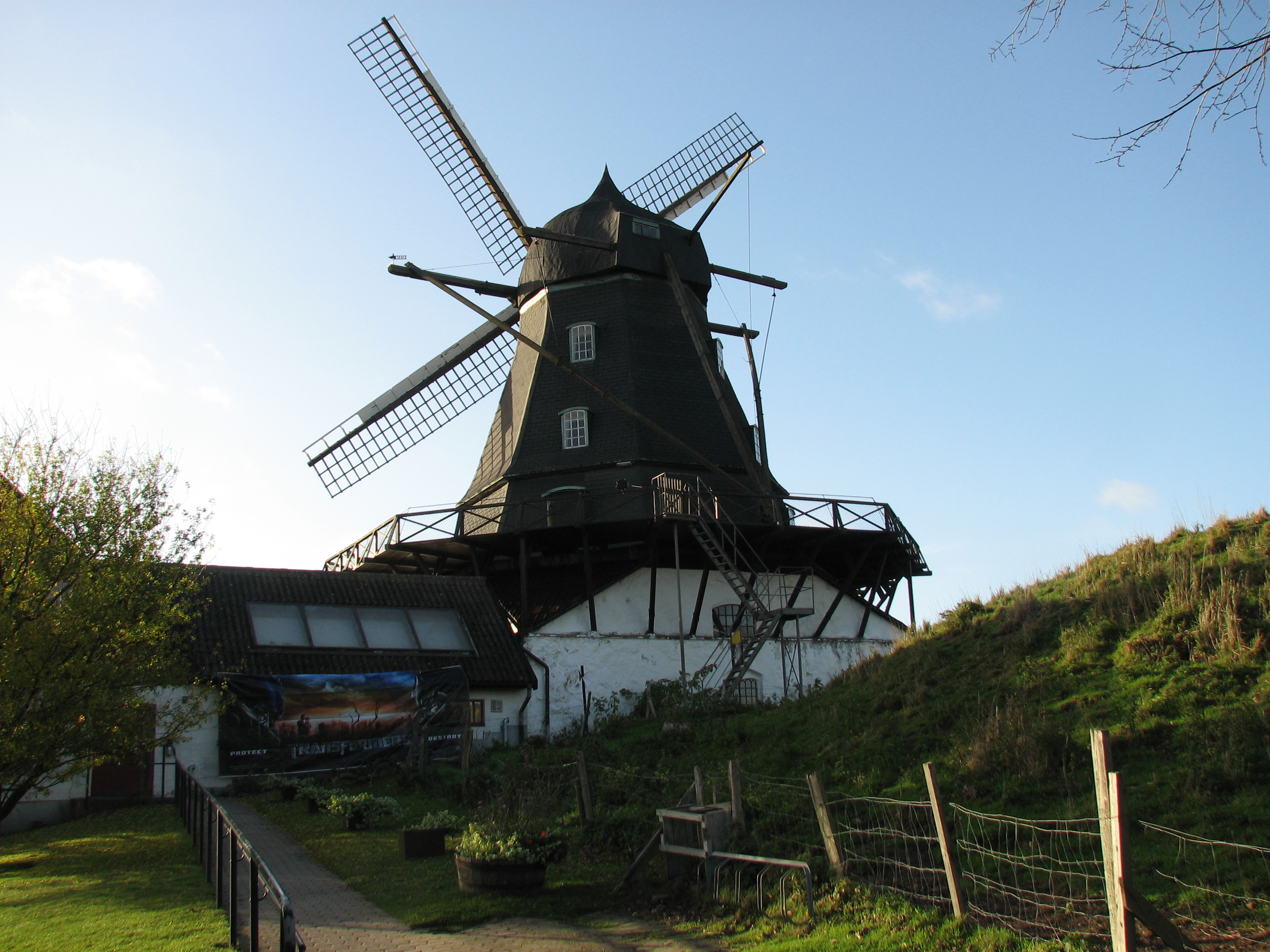
- Old preserved windmill
- Interactive map of Arlöv
- Coordinates: 55°38′0″N 13°05′0″E
- Country: Sweden
- Province: Scania
- County: Skåne
- Municipality: Burlöv Municipality

Area
  - Total: 538 km^{2} (208 sq mi)

Population (2010)
  - Total: 10,284
- Time zone: UTC+1 (CET)
  - Summer (DST): UTC+2 (CEST)

Arlöv (Swedish pronunciation: [ˈɑ̌ːɭœv]) is the seat of Burlöv Municipality, Skåne County, Sweden. It is statistically not defined as a locality of its own, but forms part of the contiguous city of Malmö, 5 km northeast of downtown Malmö. Out of Malmö's 344,000 inhabitants, 11,000 live in Arlöv. However, in the 1950s, a public vote took place, deciding once and for all that Burlöv Municipality would never be a part of Malmö.

== Overview ==
Arlöv is known for its sugar industry, Sockerbolaget AB (owned by the Danish company Danisco). The town was also the home of the AB Svenska Järnvägsverkstäderna (Swedish Railway Works) or ASJ, who in the 1970s also built several automobiles for SAAB, notably the Saab Sonett II and III.

== Buildings ==
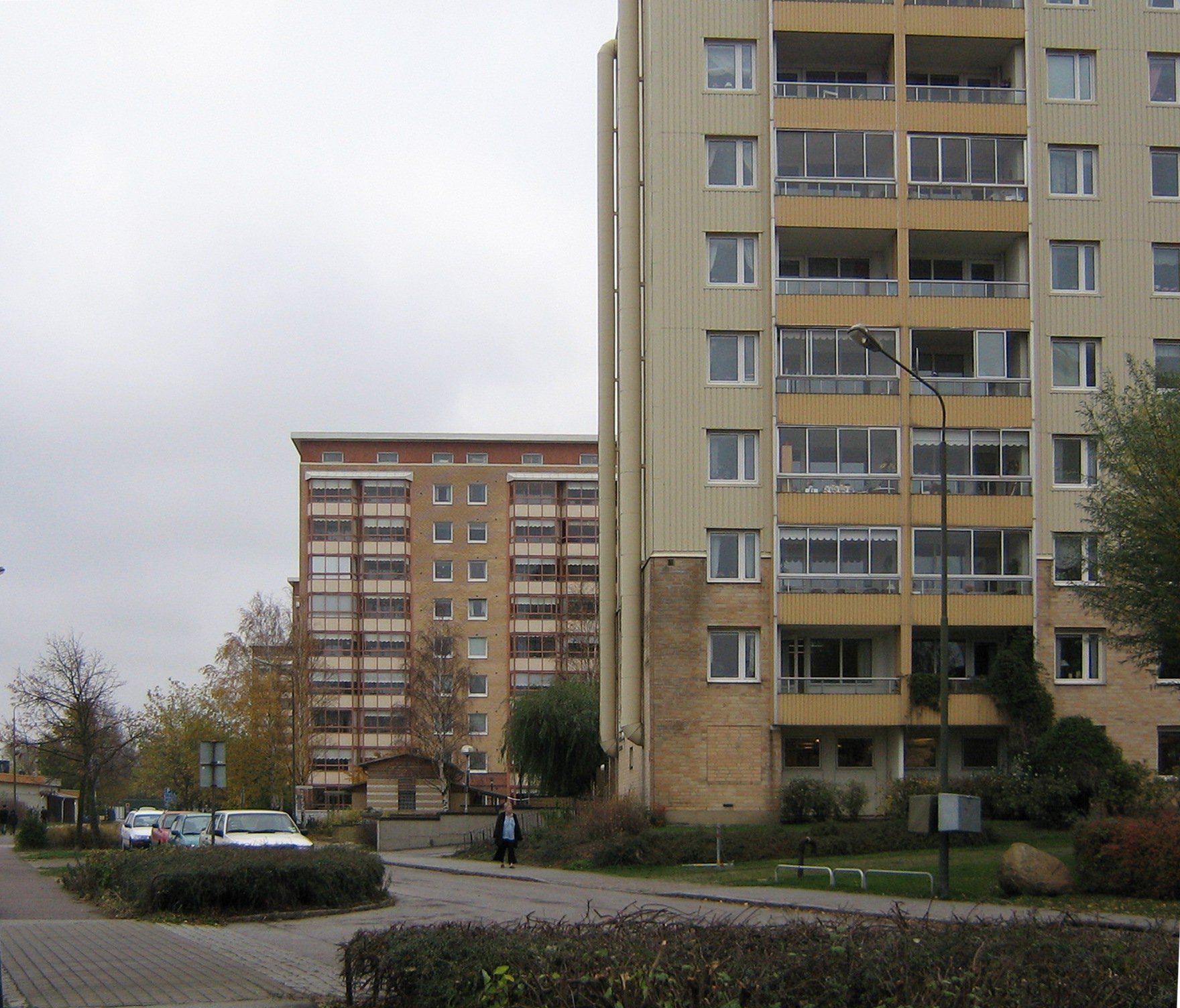
9-floored apartments along E22

Arlöv Church dates from 1900 and is Neo-Gothic in style; it was built to accommodate the growing congregation. The former office building of Danisco Sugar was bought in 2008 by the Church of Scientology who opened their new church, a so-called "Ideal org" there in 2009.

== Sport ==
A motorcycle speedway venue known as the Arlövs Motorstadion existed in the 1930s, 1940s and early 1950s, it was the first speedway track in Malmö. It ran speedway around the football pitch near the Hamngatan road.

== Popular culture ==
Arlöv is mentioned in the song "Hanna från Arlöv" ("Hanna from Arlöv") by the 1970s Swedish band Nationalteatern.

== Notable people ==
Notable people from Arlöv include rock artist Kal P. Dal, footballer Pontus Jansson, and author Amanda Svensson.
