= Gösta (TV series) =

2019 Swedish television series

Gösta is a 2019 Swedish comedy television series directed by Lukas Moodysson. The series is produced by HBO Europe and the first four episodes were released on 1 July 2019.

The plot revolves around Gösta (played by Vilhelm Blomgren), a 28-year old child psychologist on his first job in a small rural town in Småland and rents a cabin in the forest. His ambition is to be the kindest person in the world, which doesn't always go according to plan.
