= Burlövs egnahem =

- Location within Skåne Location within Sweden
- Coordinates: 55°38′N 13°06′E
- Country: Sweden
- Province: Skåne
- County: Skåne County
- Municipality: Burlöv Municipality

Area
  - Total: 0.21 km^{2} (0.081 sq mi)

Population (31 December 2010)
  - Total: 554
  - Density: 2,695/km^{2} (6,980/sq mi)
- Time zone: UTC+1 (CET)
  - Summer (DST): UTC+2 (CEST)

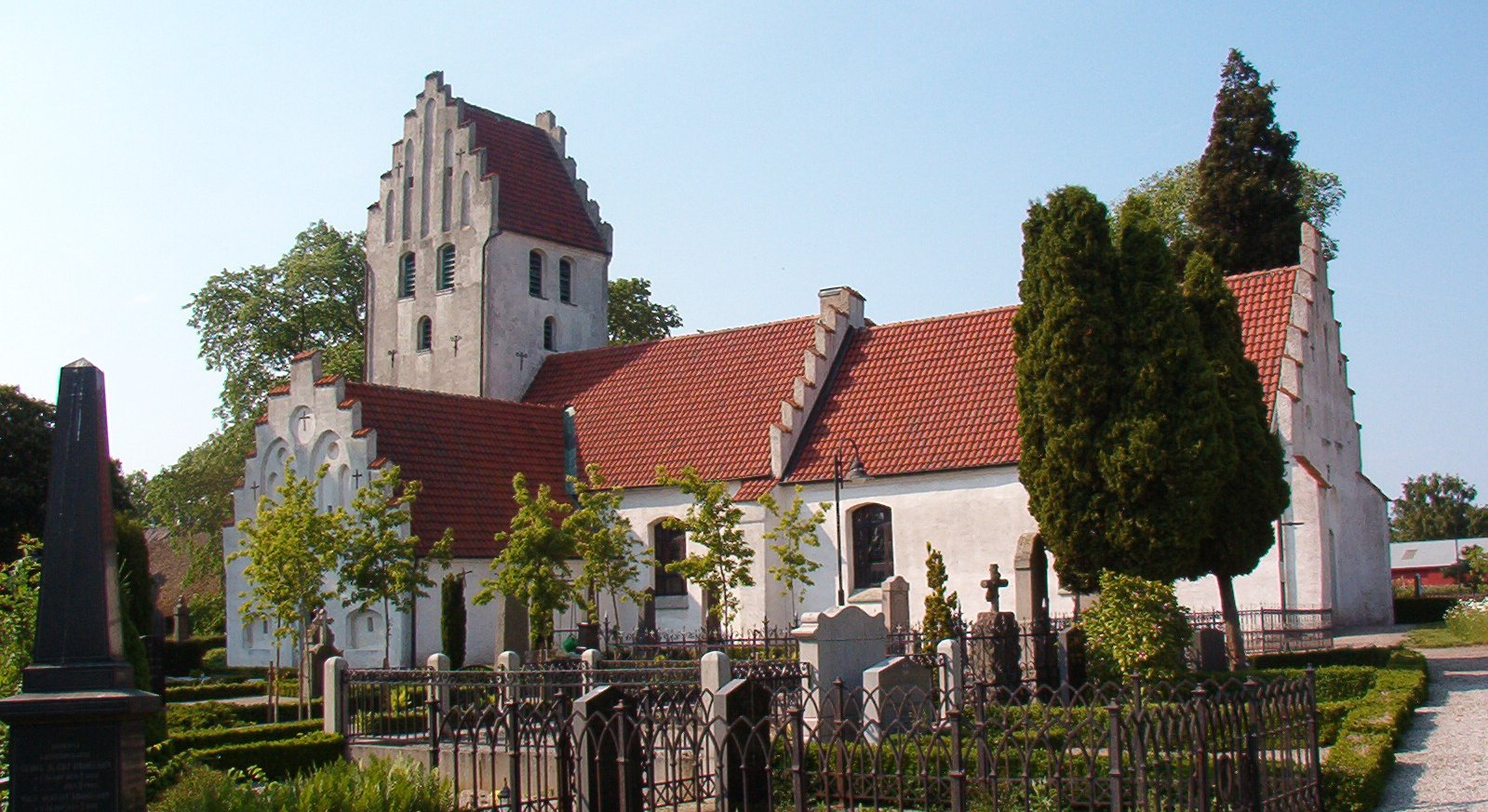
The Old Church in Burlöv

Burlövs egnahem is a locality situated in Burlöv Municipality, Skåne County, Sweden with 554 inhabitants as of 2010.
