= Submission (2010 film) =

- Film poster
- Directed by: Stefan Jarl
- Written by: Stefan Jarl
- Produced by: Stefan Jarl
- Narrated by: Stellan Skarsgård
- Cinematography: Joakim Jalin; Jörgen Persson
- Edited by: Joakim Jalin; Anette Lykke-Lundberg
- Music by: Adam Wiltzie
- Release date: April 23, 2010
- Running time: 87 minutes
- Country: Sweden
- Languages: German; English; Danish; Swedish

Submission (Swedish: Underkastelsen) is a 2010 Swedish documentary film directed by Stefan Jarl and narrated by Stellan Skarsgård.

In the film, director Jarl has his blood drawn for a series of tests to show how much of a "chemical burden" is in his body. Jarl convinces actress Eva Röse, who is pregnant, to have the blood tests also. The film goes on to describe the issue of chemicals and plastics invented since World War II and how they affect the health of people around the world.

The film had its North American premiere at the Mill Valley Film Festival on 15 October 2010.
