= Terrorists: The Kids They Sentenced =

- Directed by: Lukas Moodysson; Stefan Jarl
- Written by: Lukas Moodysson; Stefan Jarl
- Starring: Lukas Moodysson; Stefan Jarl
- Cinematography: Joakim Jalin
- Edited by: Lukas Moodysson; Stefan Jarl
- Production companies: Moodysson & Moodysson; Stefan Jarl Filmproduktion
- Distributed by: Folkets Bio
- Release date: 2003
- Running time: 85 minutes
- Country: Sweden
- Language: Swedish

Terrorists: The Kids They Sentenced (orig. Terrorister – en film om dom dömda) is a Swedish 2003 documentary directed by Lukas Moodysson and Stefan Jarl. It is about the sentences given to rioters arrested during and after the Gothenburg Riots in conjunction with the European Union summit in Gothenburg 2001, many of whom were found guilty of various crimes in a large number of trials. The film is sympathetic to the rioters. It is 85 minutes in length, and was first shown on June 27, 2003.

The film features people aged between 19 and 30 interviewed about their reasons to be at the demonstrations, the police actions, their arrests.

The interviews are mixed with police footage shown in court, and in the beginning there is a sequence of violent images, ranging from film material from Palestine, to hunger in Africa and vivisection.

Although the film has never been officially released anywhere, Moodysson has become famous for distributing homemade copies himself, usually when he makes appearances at international film festivals and some copies were released on the web.
