= Nature's Warrior =

- Directed by: Stefan Jarl
- Written by: Stefan Jarl
- Produced by: Staffan Hedqvist
- Starring: Robin Milldoff; John Belindo; Jan Malmsjö; Mikael Persbrandt
- Edited by: Anette Lykke-Lundberg
- Music by: Ulf Dageby
- Distributed by: SF
- Release date: 21 February 1997
- Running time: 96 minutes
- Countries: Sweden; Denmark
- Language: Swedish

Nature's Warrior (Swedish: Jag är din krigare, lit. 'I Am Your Warrior', also known as Bjørnens søn ("Son of the Bear")) is a 1997 Swedish-Danish action film directed by Stefan Jarl.

The movie mainly takes place in the nature around Lidköping.

== Plot ==
Thirteen-year-old Kim feels at home in the wilderness. One night, nature's soul appears to him in the form of an Indian, and designates him nature's protector. Kim decides to remain out in the forest and live off what nature provides. Soon, however, Kim's assignment becomes more serious. He has to try and save as many animals as he can from man's pointless killing, and he will stop at nothing.

== Cast ==
- Robin Milldoff - Kim
- John Belindo - The Indian
- Jan Malmsjö - Chief of police
- Mikael Persbrandt - Hjorth
- Peter Harryson - Estate owner
- Pierre Lindstedt - Foreman
- Anders Granell - Fisher
- Lena Nilsson - Mom
- Johan Paulsen - Father
- Hedvig Hedberg - Sister
- Viggo Lundberg - Edward
- Ebba Hernevik - Indian girl
- Thorsten Flinck - Interrogator
- Lakke Magnusson - Guard
- Kenneth Milldoff - Excavator driver
