= We Are the Best! =

2013 film

- Theatrical release poster
- Directed by: Lukas Moodysson
- Screenplay by: Lukas Moodysson
- Based on: Never Goodnight by Coco Moodysson
- Produced by: Lars Jönsson
- Starring: Mira Barkhammar; Mira Grosin; Liv LeMoyne; Johan Liljemark; Mattias Wiberg; Jonathan Salomonsson; Alvin Strollo; Anna Rydgren; Peter Erikkson; Charlie Falk; Lena Carlsson; Emrik Ekholm; Ann-Sofie Rase; Lily Moodysson; Nick Kankaanpää; Edvin Ottoson; Karl Felix Klaesson; Victor Norlin Ericsson; Petter Andersson; Vanja Engström; Linnea Thornvall
- Cinematography: Ulf Brantås
- Edited by: Michal Leszczylowski
- Production companies: Film i Väst; Memfis Film
- Distributed by: Svensk Filmindustri (Sweden)
- Release dates: 9 September 2013 (TIFF); 11 October 2013 (Sweden)
- Running time: 102 minutes
- Countries: Sweden; Denmark
- Language: Swedish
- Box office: $1.4 million

We Are the Best! (Swedish: Vi är bäst!) is a 2013 Swedish drama film written and directed by Lukas Moodysson and adapted from the graphic novel Never Goodnight by his wife, Coco Moodysson. The film was screened in the Special Presentation section at the 2013 Toronto International Film Festival.

== Plot ==
1982 Stockholm: Bobo and Klara are 13-year-old girls ostracized by their peers for their love of punk rock. Androgynous, with short hair and baggy clothes, they endure the wrath of condescending teen boys who play in a rock band called Iron Fist at their youth club. The girls start their own band to irritate the boys, even though neither can play an instrument. Bobo uses punk as a means of escape whereas Klara is angry and political and writes the sardonic lyrics she sings.

The duo ask a shy and friendless Christian girl, Hedvig, to join their band after seeing her classical-guitar performance at their school talent show. Hedvig teaches them to sing and play in the same key. She's a respectful and patient teacher even though Klara tries to convince her not to believe in God. Bobo and Klara talk Hedvig into letting them cut her hair into a short, punk style. Hedvig's mother threatens to report this to the police unless they go to church with her for a few weeks. Bobo and Klara refuse, Klara's father having told them that what they did was not a crime.

At school, Hedvig avoids Bobo and Klara; they think this is because she is angry at them. In fact, they learn, Hedvig is just embarrassed by her mother's behaviour and assuming that Bobo and Klara are angry at her. They remain friends. Klara then suggests that Hedvig needs an electric guitar. Lacking the necessary funds, they beg at the railway station but spend the money they receive on sweets instead.

After seeing a magazine interview with a local punk band consisting of three similarly aged boys from Solna, they call up one of its members, Elis. He agrees to meet them at Solna railway station, but reveals that they are now just a duo after kicking out their third member. The three girls, Elis, and his bandmate Mackan go to his band's rehearsal space. Klara and Elis pair off, and Mackan gravitates toward Hedvig. Bobo is frustrated at being left out. Later she calls Elis and meets up with him. After she confesses this to Klara, they fight, but Hedvig makes them reconcile.

One of the youth club staff attempts to teach Hedvig to play electric guitar but she proves to be a better player than him. Bobo is frustrated playing drums and angry that Klara won't let her try the bass. The staff book Iron Fist and the girls' band at a small Christmas gig in Västerås. After the audience heckle them, Klara changes the lyrics of their song "Hate the Sport!" to "Hate Västerås!," causing a minor riot. This earns them Iron Fist's respect. On the bus back to Stockholm, Bobo, Klara and Hedvig declare, "We are the best!" One of the youth club workers responds that they are the worst but the girls laugh and carry on. The film ends with Klara's father playing clarinet on the toilet.

== Cast ==
- Mira Barkhammar as Bobo
- Mira Grosin as Klara
- Liv LeMoyne as Hedvig
- Mattias Wiberg as Roger
- Jonathan Salomonsson as Elis
- David Dencik as Klara's father
- Charlie Falk as Linus
- Alvin Strollo as Mackan
- Ann-Sofie Rase as Hedvig's mother
- Lily Moodysson as Hedvig's sister
- Edvin Ottoson as Iron Fist Frontman
- Nick Kankaanpää as Iron Fist Member
- Felix Klaesson as Iron Fist Member
- Victor Norlin Ericsson as Iron Fist Member
- Felix Sandman as compere
- Vanja Engström as Sandra
- Viveca Dahlén as Gunnel
- Clara Christiansson as Louise
- Sebastian Mira as Jon
- Lucas Hammaström as Mårten
- Livia Rembe Nylander as Mia
- Samuel Lazar Eriksson as Wizard
- Mads Korsgaard as The Gays
- Bernt Östman as The Gays

== Release ==
Following its premiere at the 2013 Toronto International Film Festival, We Are the Best! was released in its home country of Sweden on 11 October 2013. The film was later released in Denmark on 29 May 2014 and in the United States (via limited release) on 30 May 2014.

== Reception ==
We Are the Best! received critical acclaim; on review aggregator website Rotten Tomatoes, the film has a 97% approval rating based on 127 reviews, with an average rating of 7.9/10. The website's critical consensus states: "Sweet, empathetic, and shot through with a palpable joy, We Are the Best! offers a tender tribute to the bittersweet tumult of adolescence." On Metacritic, the film has an 87/100 rating based on 28 critics, indicating "universal acclaim".
