= Evolution of a Filipino Family =

2004 film by Lav Diaz

Ebolusyon ng Isang Pamilyang Pilipino
- Directed by: Lav Diaz
- Written by: Lav Diaz
- Produced by: Lav Diaz; Paul Tanedo
- Starring: Elryan de Vera; Angie Ferro; Pen Medina; Marife Necesito; Ronnie Lazaro; Lui Manansala; Banaue Miclat
- Cinematography: Bahaghari (Richard C. de Guzman); Paul Tanedo
- Edited by: Lav Diaz
- Production companies: Sine Olivia; Paul Tañedo Inc. Ebolusyon Productions
- Release date: September 17, 2004 (Toronto International Film Festival)
- Running time: 624 minutes
- Country: Philippines
- Language: Tagalog

Evolution of a Filipino Family (Tagalog: Ebolusyon ng Isang Pamilyang Pilipino) is a Filipino film co-produced, edited, written and directed by Lav Diaz. At 624 minutes (10 hours and 24 minutes), it was the fourth longest film ever made at the time of its release. It earned Diaz international critical acclaim by critics, noted for introducing many of Diaz' cinematic trademarks including the runtime.

== Plot ==
Variety described the film: "Lav Diaz’s Evolution of a Filipino Family patiently and methodically observes the collapse and hopeful revival of a poor farming clan, meant to symbolize a nation’s history spanning 1971 to 1987," during and immediately after the authoritarian rule of Ferdinand Marcos.

== Cast ==
- Elryan de Vera as Raynaldo
- Angie Ferro as Puring
- Pen Medina as Kadyo
- Marife Necesito as Hilda
- Ronnie Lazaro as Fernando
- Lui Manansala as Marya
- Banaue Miclat as Huling
- Sigrid Andrea Bernardo as Ana
- Joel Torre as the Mayor
- Angel Aquino as Rica
- Rey Ventura as Ka Harim
- Dido dela Paz as Dakila
- Roeder as Bendo
- Lorelie Futol as Martina
- Erwin Gonzales as Carlos
- Mario Magallona as Danny
- Gino Dormiendo as Lino Brocka

== Accolades ==
22nd Gawad Pasado

- Best Picture (Tied with The Call of the River)
- Best Screenplay
- Best Production Design
- Best Film of the Decade

== See also ==
- List of longest films
- List of films with longest production time
