= Mondomanila (novel) =

2005 novel by Norman Wilwayco

How I Fixed My Hair After a Rather Long Journey
- Author: Norman Wilwayco
- Language: Tagalog
- Genre: Novel
- Publisher: Automatic Writings
- Publication date: 2005
- Publication place: Philippines
- Media type: Print (paperback
- Pages: 198
- OCLC: 607795855
- Dewey Decimal: 813/.5/4
- LC Class: MLCSE 2005/01306 (P)
- Followed by: Responde

How I Fixed My Hair After a Rather Long Journey is Norman Wilwayco's triple Palanca-winning novel, which won in 2002; short story, which won in 2000; and screenplay, which won in 2003. Its original title is in Tagalog: Kung Paano Ko Inayos Ang Buhok Ko Matapos Ang Mahaba-haba Ring Paglalakbay. The book, however, is commonly but unofficially also called Mondomanila due to the success of the film Mondomanila, which is very loosely based on the story. Published in 2005 by Kamias Road's Automatic Writings, the book How I Fixed My Hair After a Rather Long Journey became a critical success, receiving praise for its unflinchingly honest portrayal of life in the slums.

The adaptation of the novel starring Tim Mabalot was released in 2012. Called Mondomanila, the film is directed by Khavn. It premiered at the 41st International Film Festival Rotterdam in January 2012. The screenplay was co-written by Khavn and Wilwayco.

== Plot ==
In a world where cargo boxes are houses and a full meal a day is a feast, Tony de Guzman subsists as a sophist but with plans to avenge his oppression. He begins his journey as the neighborhood watercarrier, cursing his estranged father for being a financial detriment with a pompous vision of education for his sons.

Tony’s life is bridled by a string of endless acquaintances and relations dating back to his childhood. From his matchbox home of a nagging mother with dreams of romance and a kid brother sexually assaulted by an American pedophile, Tony takes minuscule steps along a narrow path of grime that is his community and elbows his way out of an interesting company of neighbors: Almang Paybsiks, the town gossip; Pablong Shoeshine, the arsonist Casanova; Mutya, the dilettante gangster; Sgt. Pepper, the town's resident macho who has a gay son; and Domeng, the pimp.

When Tony is given the unique chance to become a scholar in the state university and later, to be employed as a prestigious computer engineer, he thought he had successfully escaped the filth of the slums—only to encounter worse depravity in fair skins and fragrant garments. Tony’s appetite for escape then becomes insatiable.

== Reception ==
Critics and readers alike are unanimous in their praise of How I Fixed My Hair After a Rather Long Journey, comparing the book to Irvine Welsh's Trainspotting, J.D Salinger's The Catcher in the Rye, and Edgardo M. Reyes's now classic Tagalog novel Sa Mga Kuko Ng Liwanag. Wilwayco's crudeness of language emphasized the cesspool of violence and obscenity that the main character finds himself in.

One reviewer writes on Good Reads, "This is another book, a local one this time. You will not find anything likeable but since it is written brilliantly, I have no qualms of giving this a 5-star rating here in Goodreads. You hate the characters and what they do but you love the writing." Another comments, "Vulgar, crass, puke-inducing, shocking--these are the reflexes that How I Fixed My Hair After a Rather Long Journey playfully provokes. It is the much more 'squatter-punk' version of Wilwayco for you. A good read. It cleverly circumvented the categories of 'porno', 'violence porn' or 'I-Witness-type poverty porn' as Wilwayco displayed artistic mastery in story-telling and fleshing out the reality of otherwise 'fictional' characters."

One criticism of the book is that it is riddled with typographical errors. But Wilwayco and the publisher were quick to defend this, saying How I Fixed My Hair After a Rather Long Journey was intended as a gritty social commentary. The errors were deliberate in much the same way that typographical errors were deliberate in Jack Kerouac's On the Road.
