= Ben & Sam =

- Directed by: Mark Shandii Bacolod
- Written by: Archie Del Mundo
- Produced by: Jazmin Trinidad Tecson; Sean Lim; Tessa Aquino
- Starring: Ray An Dulay; Jess Mendoza; Micah Munoz; Tara Cabaero; Ana Abad Santos
- Cinematography: Rain Yamson II
- Edited by: Bebs Gohetia
- Music by: Christian Banawa; Herrick Ortiz
- Distributed by: Imaginative Media Production
- Release date: February 17, 2010
- Running time: 96 minutes
- Country: Philippines
- Language: Filipino

Ben & Sam is a 2010 Filipino indie film, directed by Mark Shandii Bacolod and starring Ray An Dulay, Jess Mendoza, Micah Muñoz, Ana Abad Santos and Tara Cabaero. The film is about two campus kings who are in love. The film, which premiered at the 2010 Queer Love Film Festival on February 17, 2010, was written by Archie Del Mundo.

== Plot ==
Ben is haunted by painful memories of his abusive father, and is suffering even more at present due to his increasingly eccentric mother. He is eventually toughened by this condition. Sam, meanwhile, is still grieving the murder of his activist boyfriend. Both boys turn to recreational activities to forget their painful precedents; Ben becomes involved in basketball, while Sam takes up dancing.

Although Ben is surrounded by friends, he is unhappy, until a deep emotional connection and mutual admiration brings Ben and Sam together. Although Ben is confused, Sam is persistent and sincere, and their liaison eventually blossoms into something deeper.

== Cast ==
- Ray An Dulay as Ben
- Jess Mendoza as Sam
- Micah Muñoz as George
- Ana Abad Santos as Arlene
- Tara Cabaero as Sugar
- Simon Ibarra as Mr. Quirino
- Malouh Crisologo as Dean
- Angeli Bayani as Prof Castro
- Jerri Barrios as Coach Mario

== Special screening ==
The film was featured at the 2010 Cinemalaya Independent Film Festival as part of the July midnight shows.
