= Coco Moodysson =

Swedish comic creator (born 1970)

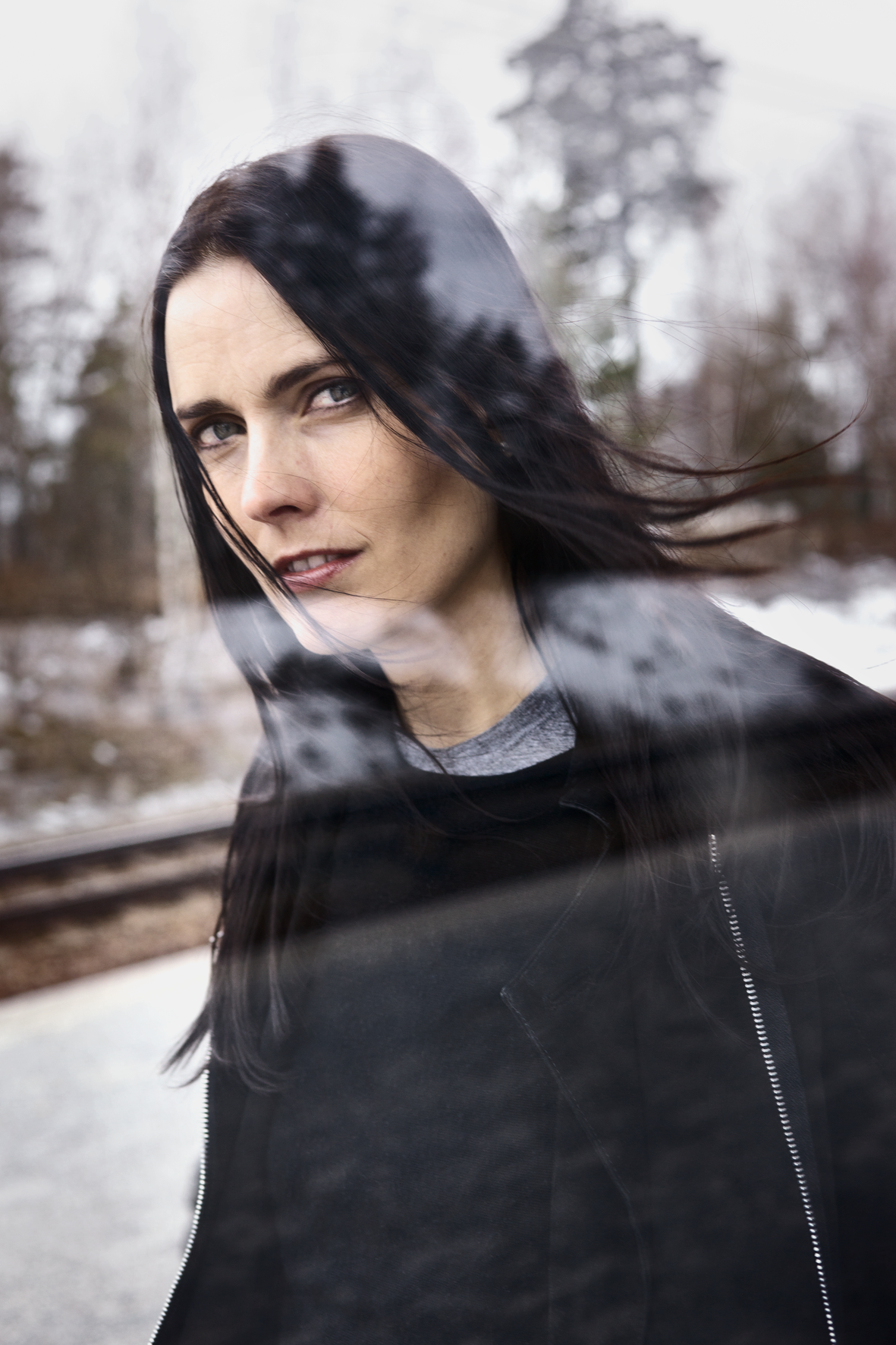
- Born: Hedvig Agnes Elisabeth (Coco) Moodysson; 1970 (age 55–56)
- Education: Sequential Art in Malmö
- Occupations: creator of graphic novels and alternative comics
- Known for: autobiographical subgenre
- Notable work: Coco Platinum Total parts 1 and 2
- Spouses: Lukas Moodysson (m. 1994)
- Children: 3

Hedvig Agnes Elisabeth "Coco" Moodysson (born 1970) is a Swedish creator of graphic novels and alternative comics, many of them in the autobiographical subgenre. Her works include an album collecting her work entitled Coco Platinum Total parts 1 and 2 (collected into one book by Optimal Press in 2002), The Health Center Fontanelle (with husband film director Lukas Moodysson, 2005), and Never Goodnight (2008), an autobiographical tale of growing up in the early 1980s after punk had supposedly died and New Wave ruled. Later, Never Goodnight was adapted into her husband's 2013 film We Are the Best! In 2010 I'm Your Hell into Death appeared. She has also regularly appeared in the Swedish cultural magazine Galago.

== Education ==
For many years, Moodysson studied to become a sign language interpreter, but she dropped out in 1998 and began drawing comics. She attended the school for Sequential Art in Malmö in 2000 and 2001.

== Publications ==
During her time in school, she made the autobiographical comics 'Coco Platina Titan' parts 1 and 2, that were collected in one book by Optimal Press in 2002, an autobiographical comic book about late teenage life. In 2005, Moodysson published the more experimental The Fontanelle Health Centre, with words by her husband Lukas Moodysson. Moodysson's comic book Aldrig Godnatt (Never Goodnight), published in 2008, was an autobiographical experiences about her experiences growing up in Stockholm. In 2010, she published I'm your hell into death, her fourth comic book about a group of hopeful fans of The Cure, waiting outside to meet band member Robert Smith.

Moodysson married Lukas Moodysson in 1994. They live in Malmö with their three children.
