= Sophie Nyweide =

American actress (2000–2025)

- Born: Marion Sophie Nyweide; July 8, 2000; Burlington, Vermont, U.S.
- Died: April 14, 2025 (aged 24); Manchester, Vermont, U.S.
- Occupation: Actress
- Years active: 2006–2015

Marion Sophie Nyweide (July 8, 2000 – April 14, 2025) was an American actress. She was known for roles in films such as Bella (2006), Margot at the Wedding (2007), Mammoth (2009), and Noah (2014).

== Personal life ==
Between 2015 and around 2017, Nyweide was enrolled at Elevations RTC, a residential treatment center for teens in Utah, reportedly placed there by her mother, actress Shelly Gibson.

== Death ==
Nyweide died in Bennington, Vermont on April 14, 2025, at the age of 24. The cause of death was under investigation at the time of reporting. She was pregnant at the time of her death.

== Filmography ==
=== Film ===
Year	Title	Role	Notes
2006	Bella	Bella	
2007	And Then Came Love	Martha	
2007	Margot at the Wedding	Voglers' daughter	
2007	New York City Serenade	Francie	
2009	Mammoth	Jackie Vidales	
2010	Shadows and Lies	Patron	
2010	An Invisible Sign	Lisa Venus	
2011	Mistakes Were Made	Otelia	Short film
2014	Noah	Younger sister	
2015	Born Again	Sophie	Short film Final film role

=== Television ===
Year	Title	Role	Notes
2007	Law & Order	Agatha Archer	Episode: "Charity Case"
2015	What Would You Do?	Sophie	Episode: #10.5
