= Burlöv Municipality =

Burlöv Municipality Burlövs kommun
- Municipality
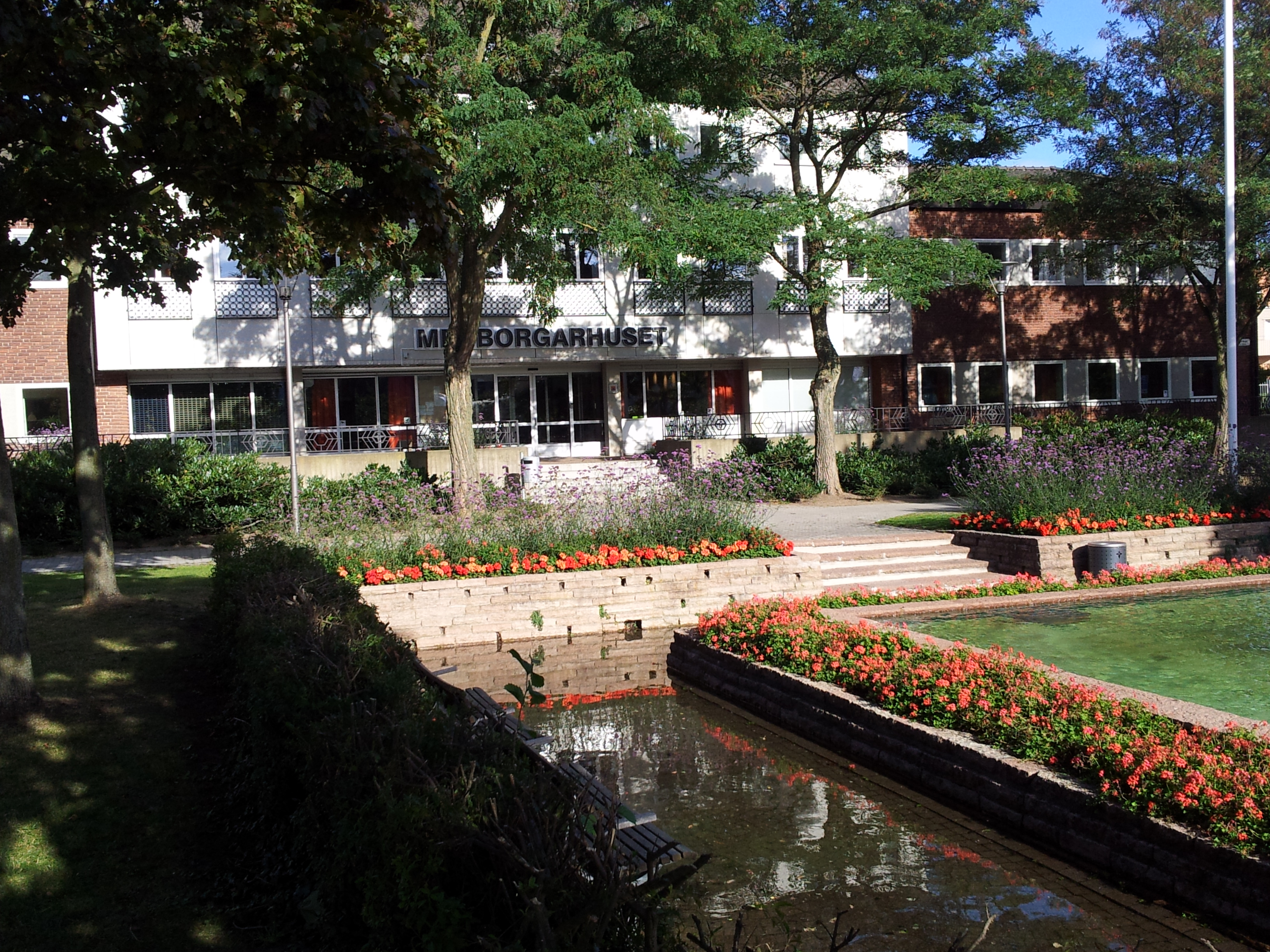

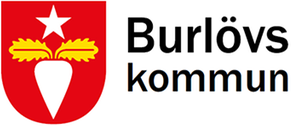
- Flag Coat of arms Logo

- Coordinates: 55°38′N 13°04′E
- Country: Sweden
- National Area: South Sweden
- Province: Scania
- County: Skåne
- Seat: Arlöv (part of Malmö)

Area
  - Total: 19.2 km^{2} (7.4 sq mi)
  - Land: 18.9 km^{2} (7.3 sq mi)
  - Water: 0.3 km^{2} (0.12 sq mi)
- Area as of 1 January 2014.

Population (30 June 2025)
  - Total: 20,322
  - Density: 1,080/km^{2} (2,780/sq mi)
- Time zone: UTC+1 (CET)
  - Summer (DST): UTC+2 (CEST)
- ISO 3166 code: SE
- Municipal code: 1231
- Website: www.burlov.se

Burlöv Municipality (Swedish: Burlövs kommun; Swedish: [ˈbʉ̌ːɭœv]) is a municipality in Skåne County in South Sweden in southern Sweden, just north of Malmö. Its seat is located in Arlöv, a community which for geographical and statistical purposes is seen as a part of Malmö (Malmö tätort).

The municipality is one of only a few in Sweden, and the only one in Scania, which still contains only the original municipal entity created from the old parish in 1863 (cf history of municipalities in Sweden) and has not been amalgamated. It is the second smallest municipality by area in the whole country (after Sundbyberg Municipality).

== Geography ==
The municipality has no forests, lakes, or streams, but has an abundance of high-voltage power grids, highways and railroads, as it is on the Southern main line from Malmö to northern Sweden. Like the rest of Scania, much land is used for agriculture and there are several old farms, mills and other sights from the last centuries in the vicinity.

=== Urban areas ===
There are three urban areas (also called a tätort or locality) in Burlöv Municipality, including Arlöv, which statistically is a part of Malmö (*). Malmö is mostly located in Malmö Municipality but a part of it sprawls into Burlöv Municipality.

In the table they are listed according to the size of the population as of 2023. The municipal seat is in bold characters.

#	Locality	Population
1	Malmö (part of*)	12,456
2	Åkarp	6,381
3	Burlövs egnahem	775

Arlöv is an early industrialized town dominated by multi-storey apartment buildings, with a working class character. Its largest industry is Arlöv Sugar Factory, to which large amounts of sugar beets are transported from all around Scania.

Burlöv Center is located in Arlöv. It is a large shopping mall in the region.

Åkarp and Burlövs egnahem consist of detached house districts. They have a suburban character from where people commute to commercial centres and work within the metropolitan area of southwestern Scania.

== Demographics ==
This is a demographic table based on Burlöv Municipality's electoral districts in the 2022 Swedish general election sourced from SVT's election platform, in turn taken from SCB official statistics.

In total there were 19,713 residents, including 13,481 Swedish citizens of voting age. 48.5% voted for the left coalition and 48.8% for the right coalition.

Location	Residents	Citizen adults	Left vote	Right vote	Employed	Swedish parents	Foreign heritage	Income SEK	Degree
Location			%	%					
Centrala Arlöv	2,152	1,519	53.4	44.0	63	44	56	19,646	33
Elisetorp V	1,581	1,122	52.7	44.2	69	40	60	19,685	31
Elisetorp Ö	1,985	1,281	51.3	46.1	69	37	63	20,099	30
Gamla Åkarp	2,168	1,497	43.9	55.2	85	79	21	31,244	62
Harakärrsområdet	2,108	1,557	43.3	56.0	84	80	20	29,469	56
Karstorp-Svanetorp	2,118	1,513	43.0	56.2	85	82	18	30,369	53
Kronetorp	2,112	1,207	45.3	49.9	73	39	61	23,581	38
Svenshög	2,315	1,586	59.5	33.6	61	29	71	17,032	27
Tågarp V	1,731	1,223	47.1	50.4	76	53	47	25,526	35
Tågarp Ö	1,443	976	51.6	43.8	69	42	58	22,144	33
Source: SVT

== Politics ==
Municipal politics has historically been dominated by the Social Democratic Party, but since the 2018 election a right-wing coalition led by the Moderate Party and supported by the Sweden Democrats has controlled the municipal government.

== Transport ==
The E6 and E22 highways meet in Burlöv, and share a route south towards Malmö. Burlöv also has a station on the Southern Main Line, and is served by the Pågatågen commuter train system, as well as the Öresundståg regional trains.

== Demography ==
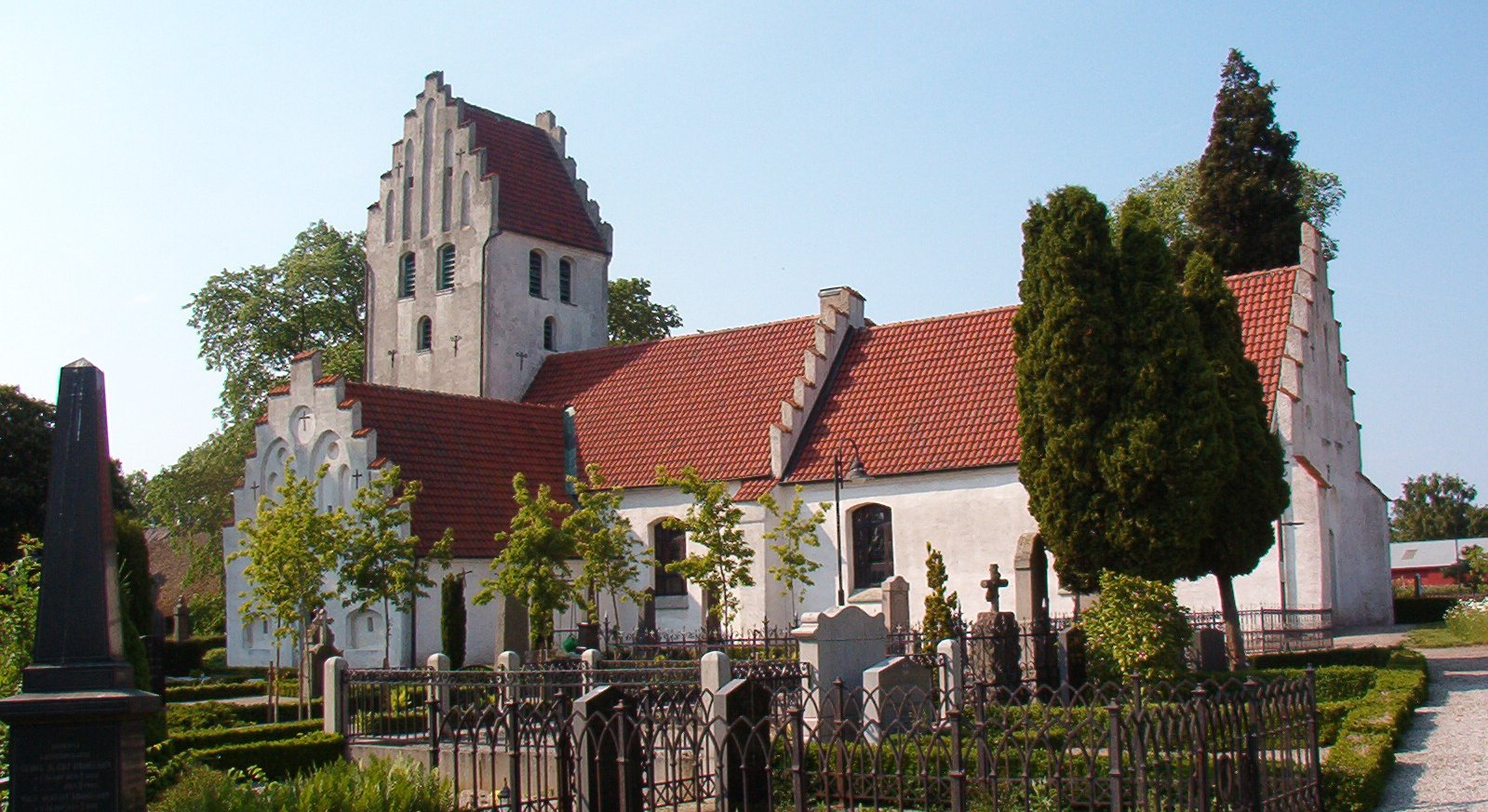
Burlöv Old Church

The population of Burlöv Municipality increased with almost 1,000 people between 1986 and 2003. The largest part of the population increase has been due to high birth rates. Moving rates have played a small part, and is rather equalled, where – as is normal in smaller communities – young people move out and families with children move in.

== Culture and history ==
Arlöv is located in the vicinity of agricultural fields, where the Old Church of Burlöv can be found, in the Burlöv Village. One of the oldest churches in Scania, it has mostly remained the way it was built in the 12th century, with its oldest parts concreted out of sandstone.

The coat of arms depict a sugar beet which was the chief industry for a while (e.g. the large Arlöv's Sugar Factory), and a star that symbolizes the Hvilan folk high school which was among the first group of folk high schools that were established in 1868.

== International relations ==
The municipality is twinned with:

- Anklam, Germany
