= Åkarp =

Locality in Sweden

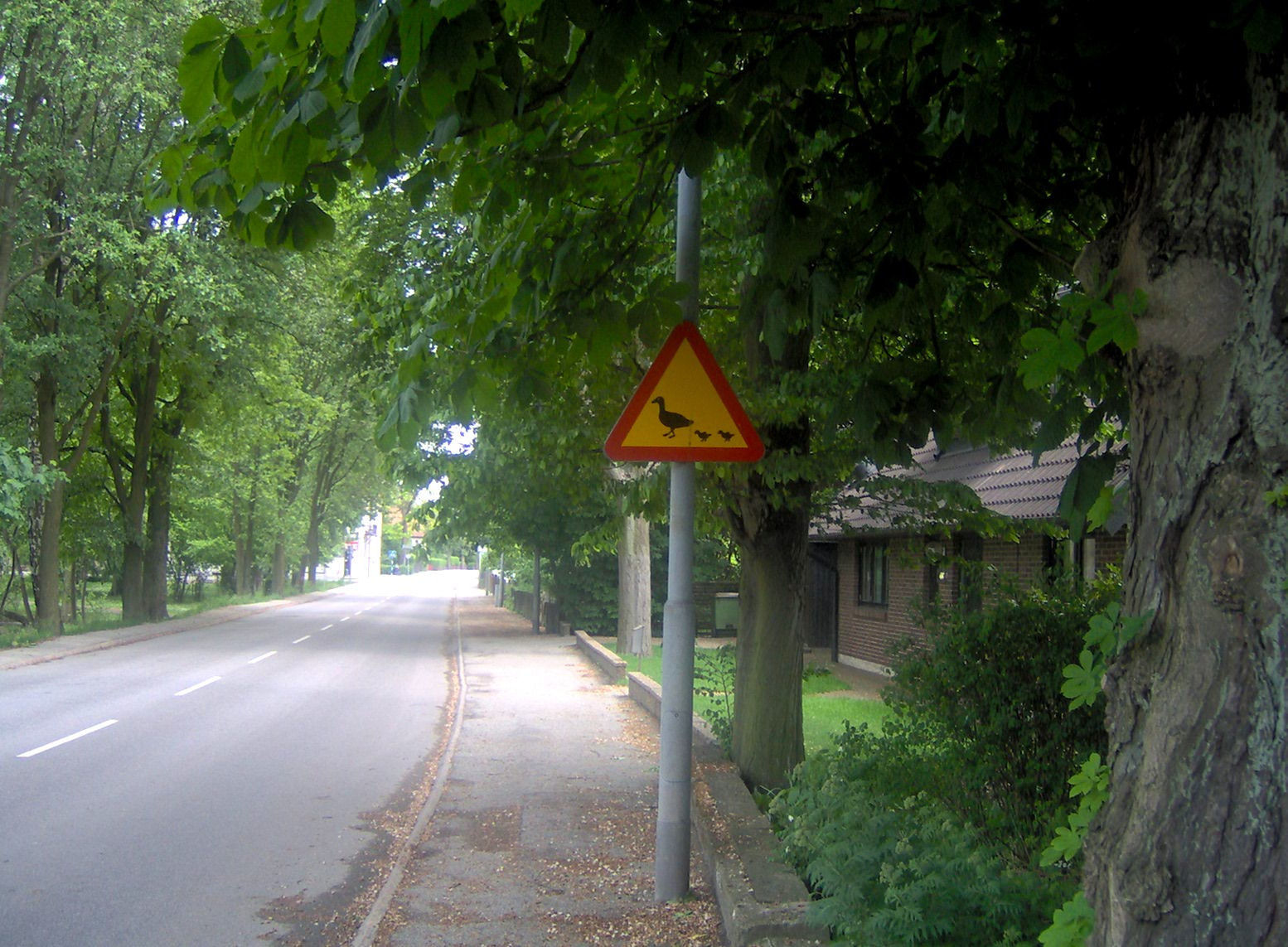
- Warning sign for ducks in Åkarp

- Location within Skåne Location within Sweden
- Coordinates: 55°39′N 13°07′E
- Country: Sweden
- Province: Skåne
- County: Skåne County
- Municipality: Burlöv Municipality

Area
  - Total: 2.32 km^{2} (0.90 sq mi)

Population (31 December 2010)
  - Total: 5,617
  - Density: 2,418/km^{2} (6,260/sq mi)
- Time zone: UTC+1 (CET)
  - Summer (DST): UTC+2 (CEST)

Åkarp is a locality located within Burlöv Municipality, Skåne County, Sweden with 5,617 inhabitants in 2010.

It is located approximately 8 km northeast of Malmö and 13 km southwest of Lund. It has a railway station where the Skåne commuter rail network stops.

In 1120 the village was known as Acathorp, from the two words Aki (an Old Danish man's name) and torp. Around the 15th century the name changed to Ågarp, and during the 16th century the name changed to Ågerup. The first record of the name Åkarp is from the year 1770.

The composer Lars-Erik Larsson was born in Åkarp in 1908.
