= Stefan Jarl =

Swedish film director (born 1941)

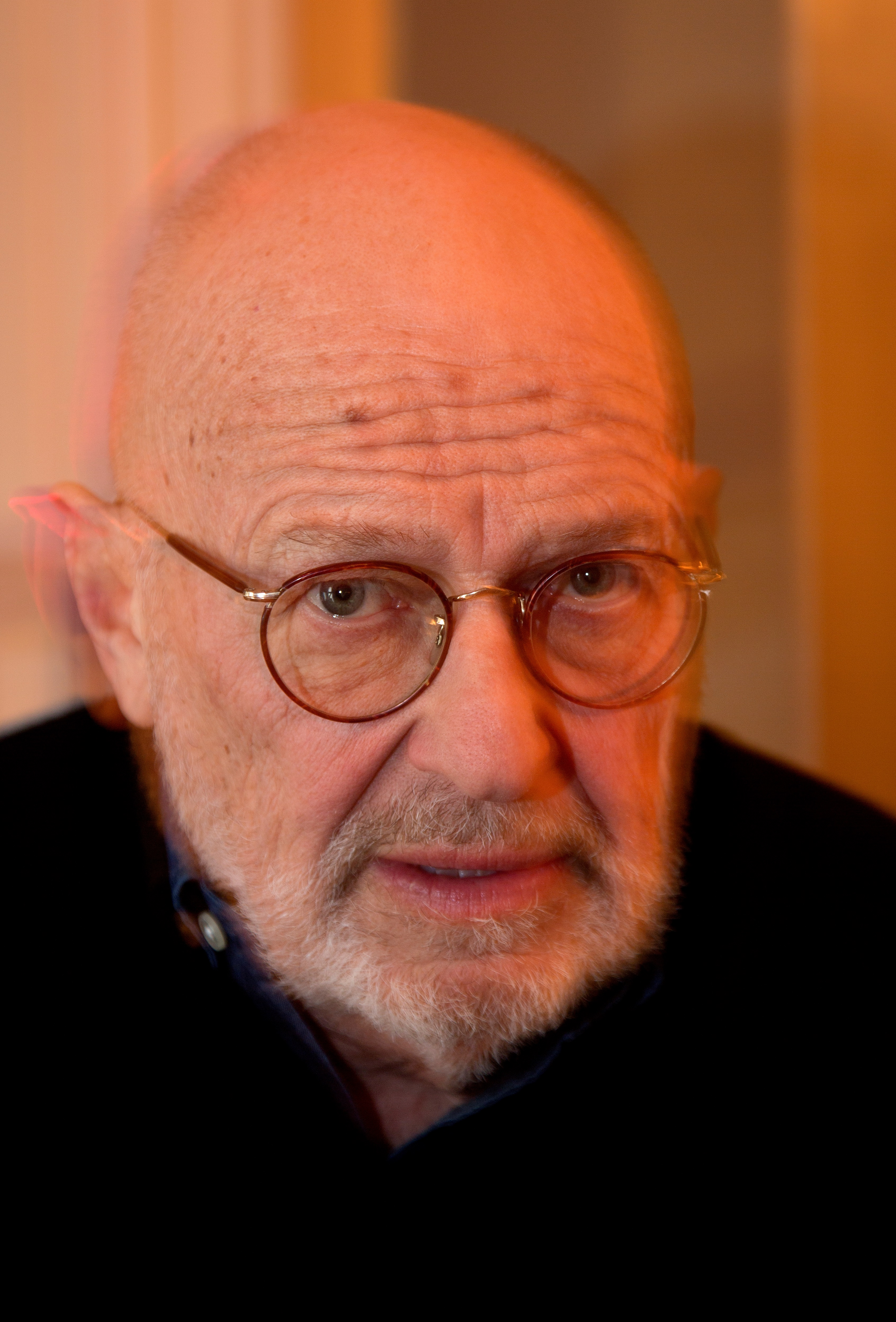
- Stefan Jarl in 2013.
- Born: 18 March 1941 (age 84); Skara, Sweden
- Occupation: Film director
- Years active: 1965-present
- Spouse: Anette Lykke Lundberg

Stefan Jarl (born 18 March 1941) is a Swedish film director best known for his documentaries. Together with Jan Lindqvist he made the Mods Trilogy, three films which follow a group of alienated people in Stockholm from the 1960s to the 1990s, They Call Us Misfits (1968), A Respectable Life (1979) and The Social Heritage (1993). A Respectable Life won the 1979 Guldbagge Awards for Best Film and Best Director. Jarl also wrote and directed Jag är din krigare (1997), and directed Terrorists: The Kids They Sentenced (2003), The Girl From Auschwitz (2005), and Submission (2010), a documentary about the "chemical burden" of synthetics and plastics carried by people born after World War II.

At the 25th Guldbagge Awards in 1990 he won the Creative Achievement award and in 2017 Jarl received the Lenin Award. In his acceptance speech, he said: "My dad was a baker. My mother worked in the store but was also a “house slave” and took care of me and my brothers. They lived and worked so that we children could graduate, something they themselves had not been given the chance to do. I had the privilege of growing up in what came to be the “best country in the world” where education, justice, work for all, healthcare and equality had been won. Through books and movies, I eventually found my own way."

== Selected filmography ==
- They Call Us Misfits (Dom kallar oss mods) codirector Jan Lindqvist
- A Respectable Life (Ett anständigt liv, 1979)
- Det sociala arvet (1993)
- Jag är din krigare (1997)
- Terrorists: The Kids They Sentenced (Terrorister - en film om dom dömda, 2003)
- Submission (Underkastelsen, 2010)
