= List of fictional sports teams =

This is a list of fictional sports teams, athletic groups that have been identified by name in works of fiction but do not really exist as such. Teams have been organized by the sport they participate in, followed by the media product they appear in. Specific television episodes are noted when available.

== Baseball teams ==
- Albany Senators – Cold Case episode The Brush Man
- Atlanta Hawks – For Love of the Game by Michael Shaara and For Love of the Game (film)
- The Bad News Bears
- Bay City Bluebirds – Bay City Blues
- Bedrock Boulders – The Flintstones
- The Bingo Long Traveling All-Stars & Motor Kings – The Bingo Long Traveling All-Stars & Motor Kings by William Brashler
- Blattsville Millstones – Will & Grace
- Boston Boomers- Rugrats
- Brooklyn Bimbos – Pride of the Bimbos by John Sayles
- Capital Congressmen – Fallout 3
- California Stars – The Greatest American Hero
- Chicago Atoms - The New AToms' Bombshell by Robert Browne
- Chicago Charcoal Kings – The Bingo Long Traveling All-Stars & Motor Kings
- Coast City Angels – Green Lantern
- Cougarettes – Odditorium by Hob Broun
- The Electabuzz – Pokémon
- Evil Big Tops – The Amazing Digital Circus episode Untitled
- Grandview High School Tigers – Ghost Whisperer
- Gotham City Bats Star Trek (franchise)
- The Gypsy Moths – Be Cool, Scooby-Doo!
- Hackensack Bulls – Brewster's Millions (1985 film)
- Highbridge Hellbenders – Brittle Innings by Michael Bishop
- Hoboken Zephyrs – The Twilight Zone
- Hollywood Stars – The Cheat by Pat Jordan
- Hope County Cougars – Far Cry 5
- London Kings – Star Trek (franchise)
- The Magikarp – Pokémon
- Miami Gators - 7th Heaven (TV Series)
- Miami Gators – Back to the Future Part II
- Morristown Frackers - Brockmire
- Mudville Nine – Casey at the Bat
- Myrtle Beach Mermen – Eastbound & Down
- Neptune Pirates – Veronica Mars
- New York Empires – Clubhouse (TV series)
- New York Empires – Take Me Out (play)
- New York Knights – The Natural
- New York Loons – Rhubarb by H. Allen Smith
- New York Mammoths – Bang the Drum Slowly
- O-Town Zeros – Rocko's Modern Life
- Quahog Whooping Scalpers- Family Guy The Movement
- Rockingham Ruckus - Eastbound & Down
- Roswell Greys - The Unnatural (The X-Files)
- St. Louis Ebony Aces – The Bingo Long Traveling All-Stars & Motor Kings
- St. Louis Wolves – Who's on First? by Abbott and Costello
- San Francisco Saints – Monk (TV series)
- Santa Barbara Seabirds – Psych
- Santa Destroy Warriors – No More Heroes
- Springfield Isotopes – The Simpsons by The Simpsons
- The Starmie – Pokémon
- Staten Island Empires – Bottom of the 9th
- Stoned Lightning – Achewood by Chris Onstad
- Stoolbend Turtleheads – The Cleveland Show
- Tampico Stogies – Long Gone
- Valley Falls High School – Chip Hilton series by Clair Bee
- Wonderdogs – Bob's Burgers

=== A League of Their Own ===
- Lukash Dairy
- Peekskill Parks
- Staten Island Stevedores

=== Baseball Stars series ===
==== Baseball Stars/Baseball Stars Professional ====
- American Dreams
- Japan Robins
- Brave Warriors
- Ninja Blacksox
- World Powers
- Ghastly Monsters
- Lovely Ladies
- SNK Crushers
- Fabulous Superstars
- Battle Knights
- Shadow Demons
- Heavenly Bodies
- Celestial Planets
- Comic Astroboys
- Wild Flowers
- Creative Brains

==== Baseball Stars 2 ====
- New York Monsters
- USA Bisons
- Tokyo Ninjas
- Japan Samurais
- Napoli Angels
- Italian Waves
- Taipei Hawks
- Taiwan Dragons
- Seoul Ivorys
- Korean Red Vipers
- Sydney Griffons
- Aussie Thunders

=== BASEketball teams ===
BASEketball is a mix of baseball and basketball played in the 1998 movie of the same name.

- Atlanta Plantations
- Baltimore Burners
- Boston Mobsters
- Buffalo Bums
- Charlotte Biscuits
- Dallas Felons
- Denver Cavemen
- Detroit Lemons
- Los Angeles Riots
- Miami Dealers
- Milwaukee Beers
- New Jersey Informants
- Oakland Bandits
- Pittsburgh Factories
- Roswell Aliens
- San Antonio Defenders
- San Diego Whalers
- San Francisco Ferries
- Toronto Sorrys

=== Batman ===
- Gotham Goliaths (comic book)
- Gotham Knights (comic book)
- Gotham City Eagles (1966 TV series)
- Motor City Wheels (1966 TV series)
- The Pets (no city given, 1966 TV series)
- Windy City Wildcats (1966 TV series)

=== The Benchwarmers ===
- The Benchwarmers
- Wayne's Hardware

=== Blernsball teams ===
Blernsball is the version of baseball in the year 3000 in the show Futurama

- Boston Poindexters
- Mars Greenskins
- New New York Mets
- New New York Yankees
- Pituitary Giants
- Swedish Meatballs
- Atlanta Braves

=== Blockade Billy by Stephen King ===
- New Jersey Titans

=== Grand Theft Auto (series) ===
- Las Venturas Bandits – Grand Theft Auto: San Andreas
- Liberty City Swingers – Grand Theft Auto IV
- Los Santos Saints – Grand Theft Auto: San Andreas
- San Fierro Packers – Grand Theft Auto: San Andreas
- Liberty City Cocks – Grand Theft Auto III
- Boars Baseball Club – Grand Theft Auto V
- Feud Baseball Team – Grand Theft Auto V
- Los Santos Corkers – Grand Theft Auto V
- Los Santos Squeezers – Grand Theft Auto V

=== Philip Roth's The Great American Novel ===
- Aceldama Butchers
- Asylum Keepers
- Independence Blues
- Kakoola Reapers
- Ruppert Mundys
- Terra Incognita Rustlers
- Tri-City Greenbacks
- Tri-City Tycoons

=== Hardball (1994 TV series) ===
- California Pioneers
- New Jersey Pioneers

=== Looney Tunes ===
- Gas House Gorillas
- Greenville Goons
- Sweetwater Shnooks
- Tea Totallers

=== Pinky and the Brain ===
- New Hampshire Pineapples
- San Jose Malamutes
- Boston Pedros
- Baltimore Nordiques
- Utah Rastafarians
- New York Cowboys

=== Roger Clemens' MVP Baseball ===
- Atlanta Corny Cobs
- Baltimore Kabukis
- Boston Ocelots
- California Calvary
- Chicago (A) Armor
- Chicago (N) Nightmares
- Cincinnati Stings
- Cleveland Gators
- Detroit Dashers
- Houston Samurais
- Kansas City Eggplants
- Los Angeles Rockets
- Minnesota Spiders
- Milwaukee Marmosets
- Montréal Knights
- New York (A) Atomics
- New York (N) Neutrons
- Oakland Koalas
- Philadelphia Piranhas
- Pittsburgh Photons
- San Diego Iron Rats
- San Francisco Celadons
- Seattle Ninjas
- St. Louis Yetis
- Texas Jaguars
- Toronto Tyrants

=== The Simpsons ===
- Burlington Drifters
- Capital City Capitals ("Dancin' Homer")
- Shelbyville Shelbyvillians
- Springfield Floozies – AAPGBL team in the 1940s
- Springfield Isotopes

=== Star Trek: Deep Space Nine ===
- Logicians (All-Vulcan baseball team)
- London Kings
- Niners (command crew of Deep Space Nine)
- Pike City Pioneers

=== Superman (comic book) ===
- Metropolis Meteors
- Metropolis Monarchs

=== Total Recall ===
- Tokyo Samurai

=== Universal Baseball Association ===
- Beaneaters
- Bridegrooms
- Excelsiors
- Haymakers
- Keystones
- Knickerbockers
- Pastime Club
- Pioneers

== Basketball teams ==
- Archers- UBA team in Juwanna Mann
- Atomic Supermen – Futurama
- Basin City Blues – Sin City (film)
- Cascade Jaguars – The Sentinel (TV series)
- Charlotte Banshees – women's team in Juwanna Mann
- Charlotte Beat - UBA team in Juwanna Mann
- Deon Demons – team owned by Larry Deon in seaQuest 2032
- Detroit Gears – Detroit: Become Human
- Hickory High School Huskers – Hoosiers
- Los Angeles Diablos – Bedazzled (2000 film)
- Los Angeles Knights – Like Mike
- Los Angeles Waves - Running Point
- Liberty Tigers - 13 Reasons Why
- Metropolis Generals – Superman (comic book)
- Oregon Slam Dunkers- Gravity Falls
- Philadelphia Spartans – Warehouse 13
- Pittsburgh Pythons/Pisces – The Fish that Saved Pittsburgh
- Richmond Oilers - Coach Carter
- Western University Dolphins – Blue Chips

=== American Basketball Association ===
- Flint Tropics - Semi-Pro
- Roswell Rayguns – Nike TV commercial

=== Batman ===
- Gotham Guardsmen (comic book)
- Gotham Gators – The Batman (TV series)

=== Dick Vitale's "Awesome, Baby!" College Hoops ===
West

- Los Angeles Rockets (California)
- Las Vegas Angels (Nevada)
- Hawaii Roadrunners (Hawaii)
- Phoenix Jets (Arizona)
- New Mexico Jaguars (New Mexico)
- Alaska Panthers (Alaska)
- Seattle Space Ants (Washington)
- Portland Koalas (Oregon)
- Utah Cupids (Utah)
- Montana Owls (Montana)
- North Dakota Kiwis (North Dakota)
- South Dakota Iguanas (South Dakota)
- Wyoming Chihuahuas (Wyoming)
- Boise Kangaroos (Idaho)
- Denver Samurais (Colorado)
- Minnesota Spiders (Minnesota)

South

- Dallas Tigers (Texas)
- Memphis Kabukis (Tennessee)
- Oklahoma City Tumbleweeds (Oklahoma)
- New Orleans Albatrosses (Louisiana)
- Arkansas Atoms (Arkansas)
- Jackson Bengals (Mississippi)

Mid West

- Chicago Scorpions (Illinois)
- Detroit Pharaohs (Michigan)
- Lincoln Louds (Nebraska)
- Kansas Anteaters (Kansas)
- Indiana Monkeys (Indiana)
- Kentucky Fried Chickens (Kentucky)
- St. Louis Giants (Missouri)
- Milwaukee Dolphins (Wisconsin)
- Iowa Coyotes (Iowa)
- West Virginia Ostriches (West Virginia)
- Cleveland Crocodiles (Ohio)

East

- Charleston Wyverns (South Carolina)
- Charlotte Dragons (North Carolina)
- Atlanta Clock Mice (Georgia)
- Alabama Astrobees (Alabama)
- Virginia Powergorillas (Virginia)
- Miami Piranhas (Florida)
- Philadelphia Chipmunks (Pennsylvania)
- Maine Cheetahs (Maine)
- Vermont Storm (Vermont)
- Hartford Machine (Connecticut)
- New Hampshire Molemen (New Hampshire)
- Rhode Island Tritons (Rhode Island)
- Delaware Walruses (Delaware)
- Washington Strikers (Baltimore, Maryland/Washington D.C.)
- New York Stars (New York)
- New Jersey Phantoms (New Jersey)
- Boston Tea Parties (Massachusetts)

=== Grand Theft Auto ===
- Liberty City Penetrators – Grand Theft Auto IV
- Liberty City Warriors – Grand Theft Auto IV
- Los Santos Saints – Grand Theft Auto: San Andreas
- Los Santos Panic – Grand Theft Auto V
- Liberty City Salamanders – Grand Theft Auto IV
- Los Santos Shrimps – Grand Theft Auto V

=== Harlem Globetrotters: World Tour ===
- Los Angeles Lashers
- London Lords
- Shanghai Stars
- Mexico City Masters
- Berlin Ballers
- Oslo Turbos
- Sydney Slayers
- Paris Destroyers
- Johannesburg Dragons
- Athens Avengers
- Moscow Flames
- Rio Redeemers
- Tokyo Tornados
- Vegas Daggers
- New York City Attackers

=== He's Into Her ===
- Benison Bears
- Southbay Sharks

=== The Loud House ===
- Abscessed Molars
- Belching Ballers
- Brie Throwers
- Garlic Nets
- Turkey Jerkies

=== One Tree Hill (TV series) ===
- Gilmore College Cobras
- Tree Hill High School Ravens
- the Scotts

=== Pinky and the Brain ===
- Solvang CobbleCloggers
- Fresno Butternuggets
- Chicago Bills
- Supertonics
- Kazz
- Tragic
- Cobber Kippers

=== The Simpsons ===
- Austin Celtics ("The Burns and the Bees")
- Springfield Celtics/Excitement ("The Burns and the Bees")

=== Space Jam ===
- Monstars
- Tune Squad

=== Space Jam: A New Legacy ===
- Goon Squad

=== The Fairly OddParents ===
- Dimmsdale Ballhogs
- Pittsburgh Earthtrotters
- 45ers

=== Aeroball teams ===
Aeroball is a futuristic version of basketball played with jetpacks in the 2000 AD strip Harlem Heroes.

- The Baltimore Bulls
- The Berlin Blitzkriegs
- The Bushido Blades
- The Flying Scotsmen
- Gorgon's Gargoyles
- The Harlem Heroes
- The Montezuma Mashers
- The Siberian Wolves
- The Teutonic Titans

=== Roarball Teams ===
Basketball played in the 2026 film Goat

- Vineland Thorns
- Lava Coast Magma
- Sunken City Shadows
- Arctic Shivers
- Peak City Tectonics
- Scorch Valley Sandstorm

== Cheerleading Squads ==
- Booker High Cougars – Kids In America
- Bridgeport High Vikings – Prom Night
- Carry Nation High Falcons – Bratz: The Movie
- Devil's Kettle High Devils – Jennifer's Body
- Logan High Spartans – Love Don't Cost A Thing
- North Ojai High Woodchucks – Easy A
- North Shore High Lions – Mean Girls
- Timothy Zonin Tigers – Drive Me Crazy
- West Valley High Vikings – Dirty Deeds

=== A Cinderella Story ===
- North Valley High Fighting Frogs
- South Bay High Lancers

=== Bring It On ===
- Broncos
- Colorado Springs High Coyotes
- East Compton High Clovers
- Giants
- Muskrats
- New Pope High Cavaliers
- Patriots
- Rancho Carne High Toros
- Saints
- Trojans
- Vikings

=== Bring It On Again ===
- Cal State Stingers
- Renegades

=== Bring It On: All or Nothing ===
- Crenshaw Heights High Warriors
- Pacific Vista High Pirates

=== Bring It On: In It to Win It ===
- Catz
- East Coast High Jets
- Flamingos (Flaming Hoes)
- Prairie Dogs
- Sebrings
- West Coast High Sharks
- East Coast/West Coast Shets

=== Bring It On: Fight to the Finish ===
- California High All-Stars
- East LA High Rough Riders
- Glendale High Cougars
- Malibu High Dream Team
- Malibu High Jaguars
- Malibu Vista High Sea Lions

=== Fired Up! ===
- Bulldogs
- Dragons
- Eagles
- Gerald R. Ford High Tigers
- Mustangs
- Pandas
- Panthers
- Scorpions

=== Hellcats ===
- Lancer University Hellcats
- Memphis Christian College Cyclones

=== High School Musical ===
- East High Wildcats
- West High Knights

=== John Tucker Must Die ===
- Bobcats
- Eagles
- Forest Hills High Kodiaks
- Giants

=== Not Another Teen Movie ===
- John Hughes High Wasps
- North Compton High Wildcats

=== The Hot Chick ===
- Bridgetown High Honeybees
- Fenmore High Foxes
- Vikings

=== The New Guy ===
- Eastland Heights High Highlanders
- Rocky Creak High Drillers

== Croquet teams ==
All from the Thursday Next novels, in which croquet has been reinvented as a fast-paced contact sport.

- Gloucester Meteors
- Reading Whackers
- Swindon Mallets

== Dodgeball teams ==
All featured in the film Dodgeball: A True Underdog Story

- Average Joe's (the protagonist's team)
- Globo Gym Purple Cobras
- Skillz That Killz
- Lumberjacks
- Team Blitzkrieg
- Osaka Kamikazes
- Las Vegas Police Department
- Poughkeepsie State Flying Cougars
- The Gay Gang
- MILFS
- Moose Knucklers
- New Orleans Clown Punchers
- Monterrey Mulchers
- She-Mullets
- Troop 417
- Wedgies
- Yetis
- Pouncers
- Spleen Mashers
- Savage Squad 300

== American football teams ==
- Adams College Atoms – Revenge of the Nerds
- Alabama Tech Rangers – "Carp's Fight Song Channel" (YouTube Channel)
- Ampipe Bulldogs – All the Right Moves
- Atlanta Cobras – The Game
- Arlen High School Longhorns – King of the Hill
- Arizona Sparklies – The Suite Life on Deck
- Blue Mountain State Goats – Blue Mountain State
- Boston Rebels – The Game Plan (film)
- California Atoms – Gus (film)
- California University Condors – Beverly Hills, 90210
- Cougars – Playmakers
- Delaware Clams - Gridiron Heights (Bleacher Report)
- Denver Monarchs – Dynasty
- Desert Bluff Vultures – Welcome to Night Vale
- Dillon Panthers – Friday Night Lights
- Duluth Bulldogs – Leatherheads
- East Dillon Lions – Friday Night Lights
- Eastern State University Timberwolves – The Program
- Enormous State University Sandcrabs – Tank McNamara
- Faber College Mongols – Animal House
- Franklin State University Warriors – Unbreakable (film)
- Grandview High School Tigers – Ghost Whisperer
- Gotham Rogues - The Dark Knight Rises
- Heartland State University Comebacks – The Comebacks
- Illinois Poly Stallions - Cheaper by the Dozen
- John Hughes High School Wasps – Not Another Teen Movie
- Lancer University Lions - Hellcats
- Langley Falls Bazooka Sharks - Arena football team, American Dad!
- Lawndale High School Lions – Daria
- Lincoln College Cougars - Cheaper by the Dozen
- London Jets – Red Dwarf (zero-G football)
- London Silly Nannies – Family Guy
- Lone Star State Unbeatables – The Comebacks
- Los Angeles Cougars – The Incredible Hulk (TV series) (Killer Instinct)
- Los Angeles Outlaws – Against All Odds
- Los Angeles Rockets - "Columbo: The Most Crucial Game"
- Los Angeles Stallions – The Last Boy Scout and "Columbo: A Bird in the Hand..."
- Los Angeles Thunderbirds – Psych
- Marlin Briscoe High School Hawks – Nike TV commercial
- McKinley Titans – Glee
- Mean Machine – The Longest Yard (1974 film) and The Longest Yard (2005 film)
- Miami Sharks - Any Given Sunday (1999 film)
- Miami Bucks – Semi-Tough
- Nassau Rebels – The King of Queens (Kirbed Enthusiasm)
- New Jersey Blazers – Magnum, P.I. (One More Summer)
- New York Smashers – Kickers, Inc.
- Night Vale Scorpions – Welcome to Night Vale
- North Dallas Bulls – North Dallas Forty
- Park City Pirates – Lucas (1986 film)
- Pittsburgh Ironmen – Queer as Folk (US TV series)
- Polk High School Panthers – Married... with Children
- Quimby Falls Buzzards – Fumbleheads
- Raccoon Sharks – mentioned briefly at the beginning of Resident Evil Outbreak
- Ridgemont Wolves – Fast Times at Ridgemont High
- Roadrunners – The 6th Day
- Royal Woods Roosters - The Loud House (The Loudest Yard)
- Rydell High School Rangers – Grease (film)
- San Diego Sabres – The Game (US TV series)
- San Francisco Miners - Love on the Sidelines (film)
- Santa Barbara Thunderbirds - Psych
- Seattle Cobras – iCarly
- Springfield Atoms - ‘’The Simpsons’’
- Texas Angels – The A-Team (Quarterback Sneak)
- Texas State Armadillos – Necessary Roughness (film)
- Texas Pistols – The Franchise (novel) by Peter Gent
- Tom Landry Middle School Longhorns – King of the Hill
- The Turbos-"Starsky and Hutch"
- UGF Pandas-"NCAA 14 Dynasty - UGF Pandas(YouTube Series)" *Not The Expert*
- Union Wells High School Wildcats – Heroes
- University of Los Angeles Peacocks – The Fresh Prince of Bel Air
- Urbania Little Giants – Little Giants
- Washington Sentinels – The Replacements (film)
- West Canaan High School Coyotes – Varsity Blues (film)
- Western Washington Seals - "Urlocalseal" (Youtube Channel)
- Zucchini Warriors – The Zucchini Warriors by Gordon Korman

=== ABC Monday Night Football ===
- Anaheim Turbo
- Atlanta Monsters
- Buffalo Cupids
- Chicago Surfers
- Cincinnati Dragons
- Cleveland Warriors
- Dallas Swimmers
- Denver Snowmen
- Detroit Bolts
- Green Bay Armor
- Houston Bisons
- Indianapolis Rays
- Kansas City Cyclones
- Los Angeles Rockets
- Miami Sharks
- Minnesota Samurais
- New England Cobras
- New Jersey Olympians
- New Orleans Tritons
- New York Stars
- Philadelphia Justice
- Phoenix Fighters
- Pittsburgh Belles
- San Diego Spacehawks
- San Francisco Honeybees
- Seattle Ninjas
- Tampa Bay Beasts
- Washington Knights

=== All-Pro Football 2K8 ===
- Arizona Scorpions
- Atlanta Wasps
- Boston Minutemen
- Carolina Cobras
- Chicago Beasts
- Dallas Gunslingers
- Denver Cougars
- Detroit Firebirds
- Los Angeles Legends
- Las Vegas Rollers
- Miami Cyclones
- Milwaukee Indians
- Minneapolis Werewolves
- New Jersey Assassins
- New York Knights
- Ohio Red Dogs
- Philadelphia Americans
- Pittsburgh Iron Men
- San Francisco Sharks
- Seattle Sailors
- St. Louis Rhinos
- Tampa Bay Top Guns
- Texas Rustlers
- Washington Federals

=== Any Given Sunday ===
- Albuquerque Aztecs
- California Crusaders
- Chicago Rhinos
- Colorado Blizzard
- Dallas Knights
- Houston Cattlemen
- Kansas Twisters
- Los Angeles Breakers
- Miami Sharks
- Maine Androids
- Minnesota Americans
- New York Emperors
- Oregon Pioneers
- Orlando Crushers
- San Francisco Knights
- Seattle Prospects
- Texas Rattlers
- Washington Lumbermen
- Wisconsin Icemen

=== Axis Football series ===
==== 2015-2020 ====
- Arizona Redhawks
- Atlanta Redbirds
- Baltimore Blackbirds
- Buffalo Bulls
- Carolina Wildcats
- Chicago Grizzlies
- Cincinnati Prowlers
- Cleveland Mud Hounds
- Dallas Tigers
- Denver Mustangs
- Detroit Pumas
- Green Bay Cheese
- Houston Bisons
- Indianapolis Stallions
- Jacksonville Bulldogs
- Kansas City Warriors
- Las Vegas Pillagers
- Los Angeles Lightning
- Los Angeles Thunder
- Miami Orcas
- Minnesota Norsemen
- New England Volunteers
- New Orleans Crusaders
- New York Bombers
- New York Hulks
- Philadelphia Northhawks
- Pittsburgh Tin Irons
- San Francisco Goldrushers
- Seattle Warhawks
- Tampa Bay Pirates
- Tennessee Beasts
- Washington Knights

==== 2021-Present ====
- Arizona Heat
- Atlanta Razorbacks
- Baltimore Paladins
- Boston Whalers
- Buffalo Grizzlies
- Carolina Rattlers
- Chicago Lakehawks
- Cincinnati Royals
- Cleveland Coyotes
- Dallas Stampede
- Denver Mountaineers
- Detroit Firebirds
- Green Bay Axemen
- Houston Bombers
- Indianapolis Gladiators
- Kansas City Wranglers
- Las Vegas Outlaws
- Los Angeles Tide
- Louisiana Gators
- Mexico City Jaguars
- Miami Warriors
- Minnesota Pride
- Montreal Terrapins
- Nebraska Thunder
- New York Barons
- Oklahoma City Cyclones
- Orlando Rockets
- Philadelphia Express
- Pittsburgh Ironhawks
- San Francisco Sharks
- Seattle Bruins
- St. Louis Racers
- Tennessee Bloodhounds
- Vancouver Mallards
- Washington Senators
- Winnipeg Devilcats

=== Backbreaker ===
- Albuquerque Atoms
- Anaheim Thrashers
- Anchorage Watchmen
- Arizona Assassins
- Atlanta Firebirds
- Baltimore Cannons
- Birmingham Irons
- Boston Smugglers
- Buffalo Beasts
- Carolina Leopards
- Charleston Cougars
- Charlotte Yellow Jackets
- Chicago Talons
- Cincinnati Hogs
- Cleveland Kings
- Colorado Six Shooters
- Columbia Colonels
- Columbus Blitz
- Dallas Spectres
- D.C. Law Makers
- Denver Outlaws
- Detroit Demons
- Fresno Wildfires
- Green Bay Grizzlies
- Honolulu Breakers
- Houston Wranglers
- Indianapolis Spartans
- Jacksonville Amberjacks
- Kansas City Blues
- Las Vegas Rollers
- Little Rock Maulers
- Los Angeles Raptors
- Miami Thunder
- Michigan Tanks
- Milwaukee Mariners
- Minnesota Mustangs
- Nashville Guardians
- New England Militia
- New Jersey Pirates
- New Orleans Settlers
- New York Red Tails
- Oklahoma Stampede
- Oakland Scourge
- Omaha Cyclones
- Orlando Lightning
- Philadelphia Liberty
- Phoenix Inferno
- Pittsburgh Pioneers
- Portland Tomahawks
- Salt Lake Wrath
- San Antonio Scorpions
- San Francisco Tridents
- San Jose Coyotes
- Seattle Wolves
- St. Louis Racers
- Tampa Bay Tigers
- Tennessee Swarm
- Wichita Wildcats

=== Batman ===
- Boston Colonials (Batman: The Animated Series, Fear of Victory)
- Gotham Knights (formerly the Gotham Giants, from the comic book)
- Gotham Wildcats (formerly Goliaths, from the comic book)
- Gotham Rogues (The Dark Knight Rises)
- Rapid City Monuments (The Dark Knight Rises)

=== The Best of Times (1986 film) ===
- Bakersfield Tigers
- Taft Rockets

=== Blitz: The League II ===
- Arizona Outlaws
- Atlanta 404
- Baltimore Bearcats
- Carolina Copperheads
- Chicago Marauders
- Cincinnati Crusaders
- Cleveland Steamers (Formerly San Diego Cyclones)
- Denver Grizziles
- Detroit Devils
- Houston Riders
- Kansas City Crossfire
- Las Vegas Aces
- Los Angeles Riot
- Mexico City Aztecs (Relocated from Dallas)
- Miami Hammerheads (Formerly Orlando Hammerheads)
- Milwaukee Hounds
- Minnesota Reapers
- New England Regulars
- New York Nightmares
- Philadelphia Brawlers
- Seattle Reign
- Vancouver Beavers
- Washington Redhawks

=== Coach (TV series) ===
- Los Angeles Mighty Bucks
- Minnesota State Screaming Eagles
- Orlando Breakers – NFL team
- Southern Texas Wranglers (Minnesota State's bowl opponent in the two-part 1991 episode "The Pineapple Bowl")

=== Cyberball series ===
==== Cyberball (Arcade) ====
- New York Assassins
- Tokyo Enforcers
- Napoli Hitmen
- Taipei Killers
- Seoul Terminators
- Sydney Destroyers

==== Cyberball 2072 (Arcade) ====
- USA Crush
- Japan Flash
- Italian Thunder
- Taiwan Machine
- Korean Invasion
- Aussie Lightning

==== Cyberball (Genesis) ====
- Buffalo Beasts
- Indianapolis Cyborgs
- Miami Terminators
- New England Constables
- New York Enforcers
- Cincinnati Blasters
- Cleveland Stormers
- Houston Spikes
- Pittsburgh Bolts
- Denver Dominators
- Las Vegas Bombers
- Los Angeles Assassins
- San Diego Conquerors
- Seattle Snakes
- Boston Riots
- Dallas Destroyers
- Philadelphia Guns
- Phoenix Phantoms
- Washington Punishers
- Chicago Killers
- Detroit Rollers
- Minnesota Monsters
- St. Louis Fighters
- Tampa Bay Razors
- Atlanta Dynamix
- New Orleans Showdowns
- Portland Tornadoes
- San Francisco Hitmen

=== Earth: Final Conflict ===
- London Royals (Resurrection)
- Los Angeles Quakes (Resurrection)

=== Eyeshield 21 ===
- Deimon Devil Bats
- NASA Shuttles
- Ojo White Knights
- San Antonio Armadillos (NFL Team)
- Seibu Wild Gunmen
- Shinryūji Naga
- Teikoku Alexanders

=== Focus ===
- Chicago Rhinos
- Miami Threshers

=== 1st & Ten (TV series) ===
- California Bulls
- Chicago Huskies
- Dayton Cougars
- Houston Stallions
- Houston Riggers
- Phoenix Warriors
- Toronto Mustangs
- Other cities mentioned as having teams, but not identified by nickname include Pittsburgh, Buffalo and Miami.

=== Grand Theft Auto (series) ===
- San Fierro 69ers – Grand Theft Auto: San Andreas
- Vice City Mambas – Grand Theft Auto: Vice City, Grand Theft Auto Advance
- Liberty City Wrath – Grand Theft Auto IV
- Los Santos Pounders – Grand Theft Auto (series)
- U.C.L.S. Bookworms – Grand Theft Auto V
- Vice City Manatees – Grand Theft Auto VI

=== The Grim Adventures of Billy & Mandy ===
- Endsville Fluffycats
- Rump City Bootyheads

=== The Last Boy Scout ===
- Cleveland Cats
- Los Angeles Stallions

=== Legend Bowl ===
- Arizona Scorpions
- Atlanta Beasts
- Baltimore Stars
- Buffalo Steel
- Carolina Cardinals
- Chicago Blues
- Cincinnati Salamanders
- Cleveland Copperheads
- Dallas Sheriffs
- Denver Peaks
- Detroit Cougars
- Green Bay Beavers
- Houston Roughriders
- Indianapolis Racers
- Jacksonville Storm
- Kansas City Coyotes
- Las Vegas Gunners
- Los Angeles Voltage
- Miami Sharks
- Minnesota Walleyes
- New England Minutemen
- New Orleans Crayfish
- New York Empires
- New York Metros
- Philadelphia Liberty
- Pittsburgh Titans
- San Diego Kraken
- San Francisco Miners
- Seattle Emeralds
- Tampa Bay Corsairs
- Tennessee Kings
- Washington Eagles

=== Madden NFL Series relocation teams ===
- Austin, Texas (Teams: Austin Armadillos, Bats and Desperados)
- Brooklyn, New York (Teams: Brooklyn Barons, Beats, Bulls)
- Chicago, Illinois (Teams: Chicago Blues, Cougars, and Tigers)
- Columbus, Ohio (Teams: Columbus Aviators, Caps, Explorers and Panhandles)
- Dublin, Ireland (Teams: Dublin Antlers, Celtic Tigers and Shamrocks)
- Houston, Texas (Teams: Houston Gunners, Oilers and Voyagers)
- London, England (Teams: London Black Knights, Bulldogs and Monarchs)
- Memphis, Tennessee (Teams: Memphis Egyptians, Hounds, and Steamers)
- Mexico City, Mexico (Teams: Mexico City Conquistadors, Diablos and Golden Eagles)
- Oklahoma City, Oklahoma (Teams: Oklahoma City Bisons, Lancers and Night Hawks)
- Orlando, Florida (Teams: Orlando Orbits, Sentinels and Wizards)
- Portland, Oregon (Teams: Portland Lumberjacks, River Hogs and Snowhawks)
- Sacramento, California (Teams: Sacramento Condors, Miners, and Redwoods)
- Salt Lake City, Utah (Teams: Salt Lake City Elks, Flyers and Pioneers)
- San Antonio, Texas (Teams: San Antonio Dreadnoughts, Express, and Marshalls)
- San Diego, California (Teams: San Diego Aftershocks, Crusaders and Red Dragons)
- Toronto, Canada (Teams: Toronto Huskies, Mounties and Thunderbirds)

=== Monk ===
- California Wildcats ("Mr. Monk Makes the Playoffs")
- San Francisco Condors ("Mr. Monk Makes the Playoffs")

=== Mutant Football League ===
- Blitzburg Steelheads
- Brainwashington Cadavers
- Brawltimore Razors
- Cardinal Sins
- Cracksumskull Jugulars
- Diami Krakens
- Deadlanta Vultures
- Full Metal Mayhem
- Galaxy Chaos
- Gnashville Lycans
- Grim Bay Attackers
- Hexxon Oilers
- Insane Cults
- Karcass City Creeps
- Killadelphia Evils
- Leaveland Burns
- Los Scandalous Damned
- Los Scandalous Volts
- Lost Wages Invaders (formerly Croakland Invaders)
- Malice Hellboys
- Microhard Mutilators
- Midway Mutants
- Mile High Chronic
- Motor City Maniacs
- New Goreleans Zombies
- New Yuck Threats
- New Yuck Tyrants
- Nuked London Hatriots
- Orcs of Hazzard
- Purple Mutant Eaters
- Scarolina Panzers
- Sin Fransicko Forty Nightmares
- Sinsonasty Mangles
- Snuffalo Thrills
- Terror Bay Mutantneers
- Tokyo Terminators

=== Necessary Roughness ===
- New York Hawks
- New Jersey Bobcats

=== North Dallas Forty ===
- North Dallas Bulls
- Chicago Marauders
- Seattle Demons

=== The PJs ===
- San Francisco Treat ("Parole Officer and a Gentleman")
- Tri City Nuance ("Parole Officer and a Gentleman")

=== The Replacements (film) ===
- Washington Sentinels
- Dallas Ropers
- San Diego Stallions
- Phoenix Scorpions
- Detroit Ironmen
- Miami Barracudas

=== Smallville (TV series) ===
- Metropolis Sharks
- Metropolis University Bulldogs
- Smallville Crows

=== The Simpsons ===
- San Antonio Cow Skulls ("Homer and Ned's Hail Mary Pass")
- Shelbyville Sharks ("Homer Loves Flanders")
- Springfield A&M University Snortin' Swine ("Faith Off", "Homer Goes to College")
- Springfield Atoms ("Homer Loves Flanders")
- Springfield Meltdowns ("Million Dollar Abie")
- Springfield University Nittany Tide ("Faith Off", "Homer Goes to College")
- Springfield Wildcats ("Bart Star")
- Boston Americans ("The Town'")

=== Spider-Man ===
- New York Mammoths – The Amazing Spider-Man (Vol. 1 #253)
- San Francisco Skyhawks – The Amazing Spider-Man (Vol. 1 #253)

=== South Park ===
- South Park Cows
- Toronto Roughriders (Canadian football)
- Vancouver Roughriders (Canadian football)

=== Superman ===
- Metropolis Meteors
- Metropolis Metros

=== The Waterboy ===
- South Central Louisiana State University Mud Dogs
- University of Louisiana Cougars

== Deathball teams ==
- Greenwood Grendels (The Hero by John Ringo and Michael Z. Williamson, p. 64)

== Association football teams ==
- A.F.C. Richmond – Ted Lasso
- Åshöjdens BK – Max Lundgren
- Ashton Athletic – Horrid Henry
- Aston Wanderers – Yes Minister
- Barnstoneworth United – Ripping Yarns
- Belfast United – Mad About Mambo
- Big Green – The Big Green
- Bio Zombie F.C. – Bio Zombie
- Brentwich United – United!
- BK Daggen – Håkan Bråkan
- Buggleskelly Thursday – Oh, Mr Porter!
- Böljas BK – Bert Diaries (Berts vidare betraktelser)
- Brasil – Football Days
- Classic XI — ‘’FC 25’’
- Cuervos de Nuevo Toledo – Club de Cuervos
- Dedfield School – Thunderbolt and Smokey!
- Deportivo Cristal – Botineras
- Divino Futebol Clube – Avenida Brasil
- Earls Park F.C. – Footballers' Wives
- Eastwich United – When I Grow Up, I'll Be a Kangaroo
- Estrella Polar – The Longest Penalty Shot in the World
- F.C. De Kampioenen – FC De Kampioenen
- Felchester Rovers - Lenin of the Rovers
- Fulchester United – Viz (comic)
- Galatians – Max Payne 3
- Glipton Grasshoppers/Glipton Giants – Jossy's Giants
- Harchester United F.C. – Dream Team (TV series)
- Heroes F.C. – Voetbalvrouwen
- Hounslow Harriers – Bend It Like Beckham
- Illyria Armadillos - She's the Man
- Latium — ‘’Fifa 22’’
- Langley Falls Bazooka Sharks - American Dad!
- Mean Machine – Mean Machine (film)
- Melchester Rovers – Roy of the Rovers
- Montreal Thunder – 21 Thunder
- Neasden United F.C. – Private Eye
- Naboombu Dirty Yellows and True Blues – Bedknobs and Broomsticks
- Öreskogakamraternas idrottsförening – Bert Diaries (Bert och brorsorna)
- Pelotillehue Unido – Condorito
- Piemonte Calcio — ‘’Fifa 22’’
- Red-Blooded Eleven Akaki Chi no Eleven
- Royal Woods Kangaroos - The Loud House (Hero Today, Gone Tomorrow)
- Steeple Sinderby Wanderers - How Steeple Sinderby Wanderers Won the F.A. Cup
- Stratford East F.C. – Ark Angel
- Tabajara Futebol Clube – Casseta & Planeta
- Teporingos de Nezahualcóyotl – Golpe de Suerte
- The Hurricanes – Hurricanes (TV series)
- Tolcaster F.C. – Scorer in Daily Mirror
- Vila Xurupita Futebol Clube – Zé Carioca Comic Books
- Warbury Warriors – Striker (comic)
- Weatherfield County – Coronation Street
- Walford Town – EastEnders
- Wirral County – Mike Bassett: Manager

=== Grand Theft Auto (series) ===
- Liberty City Beavers – Grand Theft Auto III
- Liberty City Cocks – Grand Theft Auto III
- Red Mist XI – Grand Theft Auto IV
- Los Santos Benders – Grand Theft Auto (series)
- Los Santos Jardineros – Grand Theft Auto V

=== Hot Shot Hamish and Mighty Mouse ===
- Glengow Rangers
- Princes Park
- Tottenford Rovers

=== ID ===
- Shadwell Town
- Wapping FC

=== Renford Rejects ===
- Renford Rejects
- Renford Razors
- Slice Girls

=== Rudo y Cursi ===
- Atlético Nopaleros
- Deportivo Amaranto

=== Shaolin Soccer ===
- Team Evil
- Team Shaolin

=== A Touch of Frost (TV series) ===
- Denton Athletic
- Denton F.C.

=== Unseen Academicals ===
- Ankh-Morpork United
- Cockbill Boars
- Dimwell Old Pals
- Dolly Sisters F.C.
- Naphill United
- Pigsty Hill Pork Packers
- Treacle Mine Road Tuesday
- Unseen University
- Whopping Street Wanderers

== Ice hockey teams ==
- Boston Bears – Game Changers
- Boston Raiders – Heated Rivalry (TV series)
- Dog River Riverdogs – Corner Gas
- Fog Horns – Inside Out (2015 film)
- Gotham Blades – Batman (comic book)
- Hamilton Mustangs — Youngblood (1986 film)
- Hamilton Steelheads – Power Play (TV series)
- Keystone City Combines – Flash (comics)
- Lansing Ice Wolves – Tooth Fairy
- Metropolis Mammoths – NHL team, Superman (comic book)
- Miami Blades – Dexter (Popping Cherry)
- The Mighty Ducks
- Montreal Metros – Heated Rivalry (TV series)
- Montreal Voyageurs – Game Changers
- Mustangs – MVP (TV series)
- Mystery Eskimos – Mystery, Alaska
- Opal City Corsairs – Starman
- Öreskoga ishockeyklubb – Bert Diaries (Berts ytterligare betraktelser)
- Royal Woods Jellyfish - The Loud House (On Thin Ice)
- Stonewood Saints – The Dog River Riverdogs' opponents in the Corner Gas first-season episode "Face Off"
- Tokyo Katanas
- Walla Walla Wombats – "3000 Miles to Graceland"

=== Bon Cop, Bad Cop ===
(all in the CHL)

- Montreal Patriotes
- Quebec Fleur-de-Lys
- Toronto Loyalists

=== Bones ===
- Fed Cases ("Fire in the Ic"')
- Firedawgs ("Fire in the Ice")

=== Goon (2011 Canadian film) ===
- Halifax Highlanders
- St. John's Shamrocks
- Quebec Victoires
- Albany Patriots
- Orangetown Assassins
- Windsor Wheelers
- Concorde Minutemen
- Hamilton Steelers
- Lovell Kings
- Moncton Lords
- Boston Blackjacks
- Montreal Corsairs
- Reading Wolfdogs
- McBain Highwaymen
- Newark Stallions

=== Grand Theft Auto ===
- Liberty City Rampage – Grand Theft Auto IV
- Los Santos Dust Devils – Grand Theft Auto V
- Los Santos Kings – Grand Theft Auto V
- Los Santos Slappers – Grand Theft Auto: San Andreas

=== H.E. Double Hockey Sticks ===
- Annapolis Angels
- Delaware Demons

=== Lance et compte ===
- Chicoutimi Saints
- Prince Albert Comets
- Quebec City National
- Trois-Rivières Dragons

=== The Simpsons ===
- Kwik-E-Mart Gougers (Lisa on Ice)
- Mighty Pigs (Lisa on Ice)
- Springfield Ice-o-topes (Helter Shelter)

=== Slap Shot (film) ===
- Charlestown Chiefs
- Long Island Ducks
- Syracuse Bulldogs
- Peterborough Patriots
- Lancaster Gears
- Hyannisport Presidents
- Broome County Blades

=== South Park ===
(Pee-Wee Hockey Teams)

- Adams County (Stanley's Cup)
- Denver County (Stanley's Cup)
- Park County (Stanley's Cup)

=== What's with Andy? ===
- East Gackle Cheapskates
- Moosehoof Stick Handlers

=== Youngblood (1986 film) ===
- Hamilton Mustangs
- Thunder Bay Bombers
- Toronto Marlboros

=== Zack and Miri Make a Porno ===
- Monroeville Zombies

=== Letterkenny ===
- Letterkenny Irish
- Letterkenny Shamrocks
- Letterkenny Shamrockettes
- Kerry County Eagles

=== Shoresy ===
- Sudbury Blueberry Bulldogs
- Sault Ste. Marie Cyclones
- Sault Ste. Marie Hunt
- North Bay Norsemen
- Timmins Timber Kings
- Les Rapides De Rawdon
- Brooks Barrelmen
- Charlottetown Reds
- Vaughan Canadesi

== Jump-rope (Double Dutch) Teams ==
=== Jump In ===
- Dutch Dragons
- Hot Chilli Steppers
- Jive Js
- Joy Jumpers
- Jump Masters
- Kung Fu Flyers
- Sunset Skippers

== Motocross Teams ==
=== Motocrossed ===
- Art Henderson Racing
- Carson Racing

== Quidditch, a game in the Harry Potter books ==
- See List of Quidditch teams

== Rugby Union teams ==
=== The Art of Coarse Rugby by Michael Green ===
- Bagford Vipers B
- Old Rottinghamians Extra B

=== In From The Side by Matt Carter ===
- South London Stags (now a real club)

== Rugby League teams ==
=== Footy Legends by Paul Byrnes ===
- Yagoona Schooners

== Lacrosse Teams ==
=== Futari wa Pretty Cure ===
- Verone Academy

=== Invisible Sister ===
- Carrollton Owls

=== Wild Child ===
- Abbey Mount.
- Bodley Manor.
- Oxley.
- Stowe.

== Baccer Teams (fictional Pokémon sport) ==
- Coronet Fighters
- Jubilife Reds
- Cianwood Greens
- Nimbasa Legends

== Unspecified Sports ==
=== Grand Theft Auto ===
- Carcer City Unicorns – Grand Theft Auto IV
- San Andreas Magnetics – Grand Theft Auto V

== See also ==
- List of fictional sports
