= Bert och bacillerna =

1997 novel by Anders Jacobsson and Sören Olsson

- Author: Anders Jacobsson and Sören Olsson
- Illustrator: Sonja Härdin
- Language: Swedish
- Series: Bert
- Genre: Diary, Children's, Youth
- Set in: fictional town of Öreskoga, Sweden
- Published: 1997
- Publication place: Sweden

Bert och bacillerna (Swedish: Bert and the bacilli) is a diary-style novel, written by Anders Jacobsson and Sören Olsson and originally published in 1997. It tells the story of Bert Ljung from 7 November to 31 December the year he turns 12 during the autumn term in 5th grade at his school in Sweden.

== Book cover ==
The book cover depicts Bert lying sick in bed in his untidy room, while bacilli are seen in the air.

== Plot ==
Bert fears getting sick for Christmas. Lill-Erik and Åke celebrate their birthdays, while in December Bert's school class holds a Saint Lucy procession, and a floorball tournament. On the third of Advent Bert goes to church with his grandmother. Bert is still together with Nadja, but he thinks she thinks too much of her violin.

At school, Bert's schoolteacher falls and breaks her neck. She is taken away by the ambulance, and Bert hopes the temporary teacher will be a girl from the United States in a swimsuit, but instead it is a man named Håkan Kelinus. They call him Adolf. Bert calls him Terrormannen (Terror man), and believes that he was the one who shot Olof Palme.

During Christmas break, Åke travels to the Canary Islands. Bert gets healthy for Christmas, and his uncle Jan from New York City comes for a visit. Bert gets a train trip in a smoke-free compartment to visit his cousins in Bollnäs.

On 27 December Bert closes with the lines "Tack och hej – smörgåspastej". On 31 December he closes with the lines "Tack och hej – leverpastej", which become the standard closing lines for the books Berts första, vidare and ytterligare betraktelser as well as the TV series, as well as becoming characteristic for the entire Bert Universe.
