= Bert och badbrudarna =

1993 novel by Anders Jacobsson and Sören Olsson

Berts och badbrudarna
- Author: Anders Jacobsson and Sören Olsson
- Illustrator: Sonja Härdin
- Language: Swedish
- Series: Bert
- Genre: Diary, Children's, Youth
- Set in: fictional town of Öreskoga, Sweden; Spain; Florida, United States
- Published: 1993
- Publication place: Sweden

Bert och badbrudarna (Swedish: Bert and the bath chicks) is a diary novel, written by Anders Jacobsson and Sören Olsson and originally published in 1993. It tells the story of Bert Ljung from 5 June to 23 August during the calendar year he turns 15 during the summer break between the 8th and 9th grade at school in Sweden. The book uses the 1992 almanac following the Gregorian calendar, but no specific year is mentioned.

Just like Berts bekännelser, the book uses chapter names as well as dates. It was directly written for a 1992 summertime radio program.

== Book cover ==
The book cover depicts Bert swimming at the bottom of the lake of Nöckeln with a diving mask, among different water animals, watching girls swimming above. Two eyes watch out from a lobster jar thrown at the bottom.

== Plot ==
The book opens on 5 June, with Bert making plans for the summer. During the summer break, he'll study girls, and heads to the library to borrow books about sex. He also walks into a store selling sex items in a jokeful way, to borrow porno magazines, and buys what he thinks is chewing gums looking like condoms, but turn out to be real condoms.

Bert soon goes on a holiday to Spain, with his mother and father and John (Åke 's father), Hillevi and Doris. They travel by aeroplane, but the hotel room turns out to be located with a view towards the landfill site. Bert gets interest for two Swedish girls, Steffa and Bella (who he first believe are named Erika and Jenny). Bella later travels to Australia. Bert's grandmother goes on a holiday to Florida with Görhild.

When Bert returns to Sweden, he continues spotting bikini girls at the lake of Nöckeln near Öreskoga. The Heman Hunters are kicked out from their practice room. Bert also happens to see Åke throwing grass into the lower part Louise's bikini. Bert's family's neighbour soon learn how calm it has been without the Heman Hunters in the basement, and when practicing begins again, the band is kicked out. The band soon find a new practice place, inside an air-raid shelter next to a garbage room.

Bert soon falls in love with Karolina Katarina Possén, who comes from a wealthy family and attends the school "Butter Palms skola". Bert takes a summer job at a cracker factory, while Åke sells coconut balls down a country road. Lill-Erik takes a summer job at his father's cinema.

In August Bert meets Nadja at a rock band en festival. Nadja is now together with a three years old older guy, and plays in a band, but not the violin as she did years ago.

Bert and Dödgrävarn take their mopeds to go eating at Dödgrävarn, as Bert has invited Dödgrävarn before (see Berts ytterligare betraktelser). They escape a police car (none of them wears a helmet, and Dödgrävarn uses engine tuning), and Bert gets wounded and ends up at hospital, but is soon let home.

The books end on 23 August, when Bert will begin the 9th grade.

== Trivia ==
- In the TV series episode "Ett långt och lyckligt liv" a pupil in the same school class as Berts is seen reading the book "Bert och badbrudarna" during lesson, laughing.
