= Bert och brorsorna =

1995 novel by Anders Jacobsson and Sören Olsson

- Author: Anders Jacobsson and Sören Olsson
- Illustrator: Sonja Härdin
- Language: Swedish
- Series: Bert
- Genre: Diary, Children's, Youth
- Set in: fictional town of Öreskoga, Sweden; Denmark
- Published: 1995
- Publication place: Sweden

Bert och brorsorna (Swedish: Bert and the brothers) is a diary novel, written by Anders Jacobsson and Sören Olsson and originally published in 1995, it tells the story of Bert Ljung from 7 June to 23 August during the calendar year he turns 12 during the summer vacation between the 5th and 6th grade at school in Sweden.

== Book cover ==
The book cover depicts Nadja's raggare brothers "Roffe", "Ragge" and Reinhold who drag out Bert to raggare activities in the summer evening. On the book title text is a bird.

== Plot ==
Bert Ljung finishes the 5th grade, and Klimpen will move to Motala. When the 5th grade is over, the 6th grade students hold a penis measuring contest, won by Peter Kollegård in 6 C while the 5th graders are let in to cheer. Berts första betraktelser depicts the guys in Bert's school class holding a penis measuring in the 6th grade, and Bert describing last year's penis measuring contest between the 6th graders.

Nadja's raggare brothers force Bert to do a "raggare PRAO ", and shout to a group of unknown girls to show the breast, just as in the TV series.

Despite fearing her brothers, Bert continues meeting Nadja Nilsson.

Bert's family also goes on a trip to Denmark in July, and on board the boat they meet a family where a 6 years old child asks Bert how many political parties are in the parliament of Sweden.

In August Bert, Åke and Lill-Erik sleep in a tent in the giant woodlands behind the hil, and when the book is over Bert is about the start the 6th grade, and Klimpen will move to Motala.
