= Berts bekymmer =

1994 novel by Anders Jacobsson and Sören Olsson

- Author: Anders Jacobsson and Sören Olsson
- Illustrator: Sonja Härdin
- Language: Swedish
- Series: Bert
- Genre: Diary, Children's, Youth
- Set in: fictional town of Öreskoga, Sweden
- Published: May 1994
- Publication place: Sweden

Berts bekymmer (Swedish: Bert 's worries) is a diary novel, written by Anders Jacobsson and Sören Olsson and originally published in 1994. It tells the story of Bert Ljung during the calendar year he turns 15 during the autumn term in the 9th grade at school in Sweden. The book only uses chapter titles, but no names. The book also introduces a new concept, "Dagens dikt" ("Poem of the day"), a poem connected to the chapter plot.

== Book cover ==
The book depicts a short-haired Bert, wearing a red sweater, sitting on a stool at Christmastime looking into the mirror. His pet turtle Ove lies on his neck. Next to a Christmas tree, with its roots placed in a jar, and on the floor is a broken gingerbread heart with the letters B + G (Bert + Gabriella).

== Plot ==
Bert has started the 9th grade at school, and has love problems. No longer, he feels ashamed for liking Gabriella, since she has started the 7th grade. Before a PE lesson, the girls of the class have forgotten closing their door to the changing room. Bert walks past, staring, when suddenly Sanna shows up and gives Bert a wedgie.

Åke has fallen in love with Isabella Riez in class 9F, who comes from El Salvador, and hates Europe because "they started up everything mean on Earth", like colonies, black slave, industry and English (a school subject where Åke has bad marks). In class 9F, Åke also has a friend called Douglas.

At a toilet, Bert notices someone has written a telephone number to call once you want to have sex. Calls, and think Gabriella is behind, but soon learns it's the number to Travtjänst.

Klimpen makes a short return from Motala, now as a member of religious organization "Lennarts ord", before returning to Motala. In Heman Hunters, it's fought over which music the band will play.

Åke turns 15 years old and gets a moped.

Bert's classmate gets cancer, but the doctors managed to save him, and Bert and his friends visit him at the hospital. Meanwhile, Beckaskolan is appointed Sweden's most moldy school.

Around Saint Lucy's Day, Bert writes over Åke driving engine tuned moped, and throws it into the lake of Nöckeln, later reporting it stolen. Bert also joins the school choir because Gabriella does.

Bert also describes the market day Höstskojet in Öreskoga, when the guys they have teased last year now want revenge, but this year Björna isn't there to defend them, since he is a hospital. At the market is also a "test your might"-punching ball, where Bert gets two points and is appointed "-En fjärt" ("-a flart"), while Hannu Vresi Määrkku in class 7D wins with 390 points, and is appointed "superstarkt muskelberg" ("superstrong muscle-mountain"). Bert also loses an amateur wrestling match against Lill-Erik.

Bert also visits Dalecarlia for a bass seminar, and being out of money, he stands alone by the country road hitchhiking home. Hoping to ride with some hot girls, but instead encounters a German family with an Audi car on their way to Öreskoga to visit some friends, dropping off Bert at the town square.

The book closes on Christmas Eve (24 December). Bert has gotten a parcel with condoms by his grandmother for Christmas present. Bert also talks over telephone with Nadja. Nadja thinks Bert has grown, and reminds Bert over feeling ashamed for his name, pretending his name was Åke (see Berts dagbok).

== Trivia ==
- In this book, Bert uses Charlie Tjenis a major nickname for his penis, not Vilde Bill (Wild Bill) as usual.

== See also ==
- sv:Figurer i Bert-serien (Characters in the "Bert" series; in Swedish)
