= Berts bekännelser =

1992 novel by Anders Jacobsson and Sören Olsson

- Author: Anders Jacobsson and Sören Olsson
- Illustrator: Sonja Härdin
- Language: Swedish
- Series: Bert
- Genre: Diary, Children's, Youth
- Set in: fictional town of Öreskoga, Sweden
- Published: 1992
- Publication place: Sweden
- Preceded by: Berts bravader (1991)
- Followed by: Bert och badbrudarna (1993)

Berts bekäennelser (Swedish: Bert's confessions) is a diary novel, written by Anders Jacobsson and Sören Olsson and originally published in 1992. It tells the story of Bert Ljung from 15 January to 7 June during the calendar year he turns 15 during the spring term in the 8th grade at school in Sweden. The book uses the 1992 almanac following the Gregorian calendar, but no specific year is mentioned, and the (leap year's day isn't mentioned). Starting with this book, the chapters receive names (and not just dates), and Sonja Härdin changes writing style. Berts bekännelser finishing standard of each chapter is "Hej då – lilltå". Berts was also recorded for radio, at Unga Efter tre back in the early 1990s.

== Book cover ==
The book cover depicts Bert standing in the bathroom, watching into the mirror. He has zits, and think he looks ugly. Using toothpaste, he has written the words "ful" ("ugly") on the floor. Out of the toilet and the trash-basket, two eyes watch out.

== Plot ==
The book opens on 15 January. In January, Torleif moves from Öreskoga, but returns for a visit, now as a tough guy nicknamed "Tora-Liffa". Bert makes plans for the future.

In February, 14-year old Åke illegally rides a souped-up moped without a helmet. Åke crashes into a streetlight and is taken to a hospital. Lill-Erik gets a moped from a lady named Harriet, and together they go on a holiday trip. Harriet also helps Åke, and takes care of him after the moped crash. Rumors also say Emilia has shown interest for being a friend with Harriet.

Bert turns 15 on 21 February, and gets a moped for present by his parents. He is also congratulated by Emilia. Bert joins a moped gang with three guys in class 8 C, Jan (called "Jaffa"), Thomas (called "Tomas") and Holgersson.

On March 1, Emilia breaks up with Bert, while Åke hides inside her wardrobe. Bert develops low self-esteem. Åke claims that he just thought Bert and Emilia met too often, and sabotaged their relationship. Feeling down, Bert goes to church, where he meets a girl who tells him she had the same problems when she was fourteen.

Bert is soon confirmed, with priest Abdon Rehnberg. The priests from the Church of Sweden who first present themselves are Staffan and Maria. Bert thinks Maria looks nice. The confirmands sleep overnight in a haunted house, located at a deserted farm.

During the spring, Bert's grandmother turns 70, and Bert's class participate in a soccer tournament at school, losing 3–4 to class 8 F when Lill-Erik can't decide which foot to use when shooting at 3-3, before class 8 F counter-attacks winning the game.

In May, Bert, Åke and Lill-Erik sleep overnight in a haunted house. Later during the same month, Bert, Åke and Lill-Erik sleep overnight at Ekeboskogen, where according to rumors a UFO is said to have been seen. Bert, Åke and Lill-Erik also babysit a family where a 4 years old acts violent to hitwards Lill-Erik in the apartment.

In May, Bert also falls in love with Gabriella, in class 6 at Blåsjöskolan. Gabriella is called "Gabby", and her sister is called Amanda.

The book ends on 7 June, with Bert planning for the upcoming summer, where he will travel to Spain and hold a summer job at a cracker factory.

== Trivia ==
- Emilia breaks up with Bert at Emilia's home on 1 March in the 8th grade, which is exactly the same date two years after Bert breaks up with Nadja in the 6th grade.
- The book features lyrics from the Heman Hunters songs Heaven and Panncake and Svenska kannibaler, the first of them was also recorded at the May cassette tape recording of "Berts vidare betraktelser" (replacing "Take the Night" from the book version).
- The closing lines for the chapter "Lill-Erik och skäggväxten" (30/5), who are "Tjing, tjing - rymdling", was even used as closing lines for the TV series episode "Närkontakt i sjätte klassen".
