= Berts bryderier =

1995 novel by Anders Jacobsson and Sören Olsson

- Author: Anders Jacobsson and Sören Olsson
- Illustrator: Sonja Härdin
- Language: Swedish
- Series: Bert
- Genre: Diary, children's, youth
- Set in: fictional town of Öreskoga, Sweden
- Published: 1995
- Publication place: Sweden

Berts bryderier (Swedish: Bert's perplexities) is a diary novel written by Anders Jacobsson and Sören Olsson and originally published in 1995.

The novel tells the story of Bert Ljung from 25 December to 13 February during the Christmas break and spring term of the 9th grade at school in Sweden.

== Book cover ==
The book cover depicts Bert, trying to comfort Nadja who is sad, as they both sit on the bed in Bert's untidy room. Below the bed, two eyes watch out.

== Plot ==
Bert tries to retrieve Nadja. The book also focuses on rock lyrics in Swedish, written by Bert for the Heman Hunters, focusing more and more on political and social problems.

During the New Year's nigh, Bert participates at a party in the single family house of classmate Christoffer Palm, as his parents have travelled to the Canary Islands. The party is messy. Bert soon shows interest for Patricia Tivenius. Åke is together with a Celine, a hearing-impaired girl attending the second grade of the Swedish secondary school.

Bert also discovers old Heman Hunters lyrics from the 6th grade, among them Take the Night and Jäh Rocken Roll. When school begins again after the Christmas break, Bert does a review of his class.

Bert also tells the story of when his grandfather's father Vladimir Livanov came to Sweden from Russia a long time ago.

When Bert visits Nadja, her brothers are working or studying. Rolf ("Roffe") is a travelling computer salesman, Ragnar ("Ragge") works as a staff leader at the postal office, while Reinhold is studying at the college to become a doctor.
