= Bert och Boysen =

1996 novel by Anders Jacobsson and Sören Olsson

- Author: Anders Jacobsson and Sören Olsson
- Illustrator: Sonja Härdin
- Language: Swedish
- Series: Bert
- Genre: Diary, Children's, Youth
- Set in: fictional town of Öreskoga, Sweden
- Published: 1995
- Publication place: Sweden

Bert och Boysen (Swedish: Bert and the boys) is a diary novel, written by Anders Jacobsson and Sören Olsson and originally published in 1996. It tells the story of Bert Ljung from 27 August to 6 November during the calendar year he turns 12 during the autumn term of the 6th grade school in Sweden.

== Book cover ==
The book cover depicts Bert and his friends standing at the schoolyard.

== Plot ==
Bert begins the 6th grade, and is second oldest in his class afterLisa, and his friends soon start the gang 'Becka Boysen' to control the local candy trade. They are inspired by violent video films.

Bert is together with Nadja, but Nadja more seems to show interest for playing the violin than hanging with Bert. Bert also wonders what she is doing with Rasmus, a guy she plays music with.

Bert's grandmother meets a new man, Henry, and the Ljung family's car breaks apart. Several chapters close with "Kobåj-Kurt" stories.
