= Lukas Enqvist =

Swedish ice hockey player

- Born: 6 April 1998 (age 26); Karlstad, Sweden
- Height: 5 ft 11 in (180 cm)
- Weight: 176 lb (80 kg; 12 st 8 lb)
- Position: Forward
- Shoots: Left
- SHL team Former teams: Timrå IK; Färjestad BK
- Playing career: 2015–present

Lukas Enqvist (born 6 April 1998) is a Swedish ice hockey player. He is currently playing with Timrå IK of the Swedish Hockey League (SHL). He previously played with Färjestad BK.

== Career ==
Born in Karlstad, Sweden, Enqvist played junior hockey, with local team Färjestad BK. In 2012–13, he debuted at the under-16 level as a 15-year-old, playing eight games in the J16 SM. The following season he dressed for 17 U-16 games, recording seven goals and five assists. He also competed with a regional all-star team from Värmland in the annual TV-pucken, an under-15 national tournament, and notched one goal and three assists over eight games. In 2014–15, Enqvist move on to Färjestad BK's J20 SuperElit team at 17 years old. In 2015-16, Enqvist made his SHL debut with Färjestad BK.

== Career statistics ==
=== Regular season and playoffs ===
			Regular season					Playoffs
Season	Team	League	GP	G	A	Pts	PIM	GP	G	A	Pts	PIM
2014–15	Färjestad BK	J20	8	0	0	0	0	—	—	—	—	—
2015–16	Färjestad BK	J20	45	7	15	22	12	5	0	0	0	8
2015–16	Färjestad BK	SHL	2	0	0	0	0	—	—	—	—	—
2016–17	Färjestad BK	J20	35	2	15	17	16	2	1	1	2	0
2016–17	Färjestad BK	SHL	19	0	1	1	4	—	—	—	—	—
2017–18	Färjestad BK	J20	10	2	8	10	2	—	—	—	—	—
2017–18	Färjestad BK	SHL	3	0	0	0	0	—	—	—	—	—
