= Rude Kids =

Swedish punk rock band

- Origin: Hagsätra, Sweden
- Genres: Punk rock
- Years active: 1978–present
- Members: Björn "Böna" Eriksson, Lasse Olsson, Ola "Spaceman" Nilsson, Lasse "Throw-it" Persson, Nils Hisse Hallström, Janne Strindlund

Rude Kids is a punk rock band from Hagsätra. Their first single "Raggare Is a Bunch of Motherfuckers", that they recorded themselves, was released by Polydor in 1978. Rude Kids was the first Swedish punk band to release a record through a major record label. The single sold between 5000 and 6000 copies (compared to 600-700 copies for an average Sham 69 single). Tony Parsons named it "single of the year". Polydor also released the single "Stranglers" and the LP Safe Society. Their records got good reviews in the press.

Rude Kids played in London a few times. Once they opened up for Madness (only realising at the gig that it was Madness, not Doctors of Madness) and were attacked by skinheads in the audience. After they fled the stage the audience smashed up all the gear without realising they smashed up Madness's gear.

In 1980, when Rude Kids signed with the record company Sonet, they had a more poppy sound compared to their earlier music. In 2002 Turbonegro performed a cover on the Rude Kids song "Raggare Is a Bunch of Motherfuckers" at Hultsfredsfestivalen.

== Members ==
- Björn "Böna" Eriksson - vocals
- Lasse Olsson - guitar
- Ola "Spaceman" Nilsson - bass
- Lasse "Throw-it" Persson - drums
- Nils Hisse Hallström - guitar
- Janne Strindlund - organ

== Discography ==
- Raggare Is a Bunch of Motherfuckers (Polydor EP - 1978)
- Stranglers (If It's Quiet Why Don't You Play) (Polydor EP - 1978)
- Absolute Ruler (Polydor EP - 1979)
- Safe Society (Polydor LP - 1979)
- Safe Society (Bootleg LP)
- Punk Will Never Die (Bootleg LP)
- Safe Society (Polydor Kassett - 1979)
- Next Time (I'll Beat Björn Borg) (Sonet EP - 1980)
- 1984 Refuse It (Sonet MP - 1984)
- Spådd i handen (Smash EP)
- Pallisades Park (Smash EP)
- När sommaren hittat till stan (Smash EP)
- The Worst of Rude Kids (Distortion CD - 1998)
