= Berts första betraktelser =

1990 novel by Anders Jacobsson and Sören Olsson

- Author: Anders Jacobsson and Sören Olsson
- Illustrator: Sonja Härdin
- Language: Swedish
- Series: Bert
- Genre: Diary, Children's, Youth
- Set in: fictional town of Öreskoga, Sweden; Åland, Finland
- Published: 1990
- Publication place: Sweden

Berts första betraktelser (Swedish: Bert's first contemplations) is a diary novel, written by Anders Jacobsson and Sören Olsson and originally published in 1990. It tells the story of Bert Ljung from 1 January to 30 April during the calendar year he turns 13. The book uses the 1989 almanac following the Gregorian Calendar. On 19 January, the book version mentions the year being 1989, but the cassette tape recording mentions no specific year at all. The book also mentions Åke as a "76:er". As standard, Bert opens the chapters with the words "Hej hej hallå dagboken!" and finishes with "Tack och hej – leverpastej". Bert writes diary for each day during this calendar year, and most notes depicts what happened yesterday.

Originally, the Berts betraktelser trilogy appeared in the radio program Almanackan during 1989, where one program was done each day during one year, which Sören thought was fitting well for a diary. For first time, Sonja Härdin illustrated the books.

== Book cover ==
The book cover depicts Bert in his untidy room, and the almanac date of 1 January. A candle is burning at the table, and two eyes watch out from under his bed. On the floor are Phantom comic books, and a spider hangs down the book title text. On the wall is Bert's electric bass, and cards of different girls. Even the text "SH – 89" is seen.

== Plot ==
The Christmas-New Year holiday season goes towards its end, and Bert writes in his new diary. When Åke returns home from a holiday to the Canary Islands, the pop/rock band Heman Hunters (which has been required to change name from "Dum i huvet" ("Stupid in the head") as the old band name gave no gigs) meets at Åke, and here the band gets its recurring line-up. Soon, the spring term in the 6th grade begins.

Bert is still together with Nadja, but when a new guy in his class appears, she tells him he "looks pretty good". During a break-in at the Beckaskolan school canteen, Bert believes/hopes the new guy in Nadja's class did the break-in, before Nadja tells that a 56 years old man did the break in. When Bert goes to Nadja, her raggare, brothers forces him to do a "raggare PRYO ".

In January, Bert's neighbour "kapten" ("captain") dies when his favourite bandy team loses an important televised game, and the municipality responses for the funeral as he has no relatives still alive. Bert and Åke decide to attend the funeral and read a poem.

When the king of Sweden has his name day on 28 January Bert and Åke set up fireworks for him in the park, using Åke's home-made fireworks, who fly away in a one-way direction towards a house. When Bert visits Nadja, he puts cotton balls in her ear to avoid hearing her playing the violin, which turns her angry and she fights with the violin bow, which hits the cotton ball in Bert's ear.

In February, Bert stays with his grandmother when his parents travel to Åland. When Bert is about to turn 13 on 21 February, he and Åke start longing for moped, two years before the laws of Sweden would allow them to drive one. However, they manage to borrow mopeds from a lessor. Bert also pawns his father's wedding ring, but regrets his acting when noticing Ågren, who he believes has been sent out by God, and Bert purchase the wedding ring again, despite it being more expensive this time. As Bert turns 13 he receives a greeting hug from Paulina in class 6 B, and his interest for Nadja slowly starts to decline. During Bert's birthday party, Nadja doesn't attend.

On 1 March Bert goes to Nadja and breaks up with her, and soon his interest for Paulina grows. Bert also accidentally tells Paulina he has a dog, when she tells him she likes dogs. However, Bert has no dog, and is parents are allergic. An attempt to make Lill-Eriks dachshund look like a poodle fails.

Bert also receives new neighbours, as Italian immigrant family Panatta from Sundsvall moves into recently deceased neighbour Kapten's former apartment, and a party is held.

In April, Bert does his PRAO at the "Kurres bensin & tillbehör" petrol station, even if he wanted to do it at the fire station, a place that Jörgen Karlsson takes. The guys in Bert's class use Björna's drill to drill a whole in the girls physical education changing room. Bert still likes Paulina, and wishes he had a secret telephone line over to class 6 B, as he knows Paulina does well at school, and could have help him during homework tests.

During a school dance at Jungbergska skolan, Bert learns that Paulina's mother is actually a cousin to Nadja's father.

Bert also fixes a practice hall for the Heman Hunters, located in the basement of the apartment building where Bert's family lives. The neighbours first think the noise coming from the basement are abuse, and the ambulance and the police appears, before the band sings for the rescue staff.

The book ends with an image of a pencil, and the words:

"Detta är den penna i naturlig storlek, med vilken dessa betraktelser nedtecknats."

translated

"This is a pencil out of natural size, with which these contemplations have been written down"

== Audiobook ==
Audio recordings were released to four cassette tapes by the Änglatroll label in 1993 entitled "Berts januaribetraktelser"., "Berts februaribetraktelser"., Berts marsbetraktelser och Berts aprilbetraktelser

=== Music and songs ===
The cassette tapes consist of following songs:

- Januari: "Take the Night", "Min pung", "Hej kapten (nu är du död)", "Körv" ("Körv")
- Februari: "Mormor är religiös", "Moppe", "Gå, Ågren", "Fan, vilket party"
- Mars: "Du kan dra åt helvete", "Snoppmätartävling", "Nya grannar", "Upp o ner"
- April: "Borra bra", "Alla kan svenska", "Prao - Prao", "Boogie-woogie"

== Later adaptions ==
On 22 January Bert writes how Nadja's brothers force him to do a "raggare" PRYO. The story has become famous, and depicted in the TV series episode "Fega pojkar får ibland kyssa vackra flickor", and the comics.

== Trivia ==
- Bert breaks up with Nadja on 1 March in the 6th grade, which becomes exactly two years before Emilia breaks up with Bert in the 8th grade.
- Kurre from the petrol station has a short guest appearance in Berts bravader, rescuing Bert from a letterbox (having got himself stuck trying to retrieve some nasty letters to Emilia).
