= TV-pucken =

Swedish ice hockey tournament

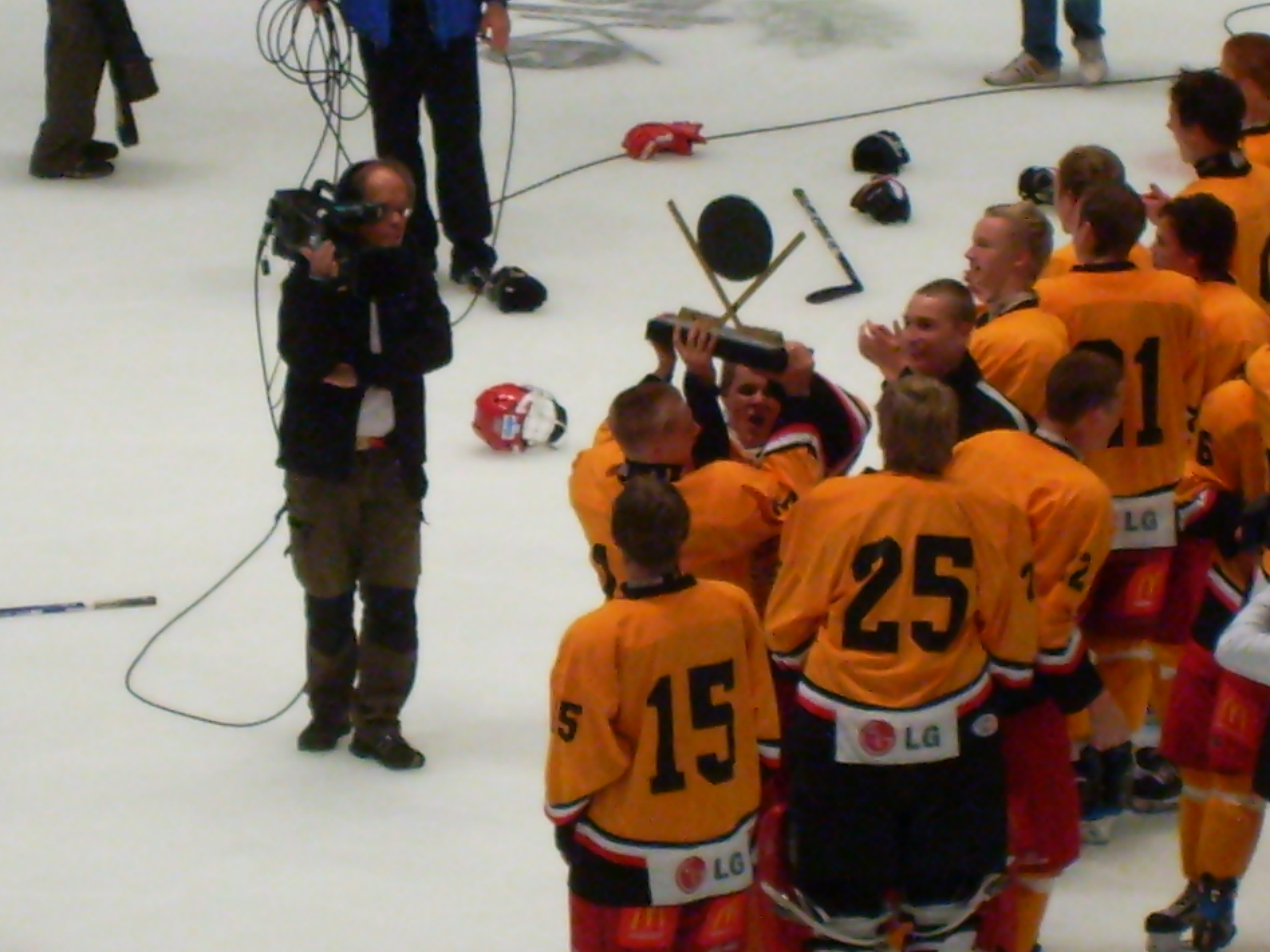
- Småland winning the 2008 event
- Status: active
- Genre: sporting event
- Date: varying
- Frequency: annual
- Country: Sweden
- Inaugurated: 1959 (Boys); 2019 (Girls)
- Website: www.swehockey.se/Svenskishockey/serierturneringar/TV-pucken

TV-pucken (English: the TV puck) is a Swedish national under-16 ice hockey tournament for district teams. The boys' TV-pucken was established in 1959, created on the initiative of Swedish ice hockey player Sven "Tumba" Johansson.

The tournament is named "TV-pucken" because when it was first played in 1959, every game was broadcast on television, but nowadays only the playoff games are shown.

The allowed maximum age of the players was originally 16 years, but reduced to 15 in 1979. During a meeting on Bosön in December 2002 it was decided to increase the age from 15 to 16 from the 2003 tournament, to prevent the "early exclusion" caused by young players giving up ice hockey.

The tournament has also given birth to the expressions of TV-pucken crowd (Swedish: TV-puckshög) and TV-pucken joy (Swedish: TV-pucksglädje) as the entire team throws themself onto the playing surface celebrating goals and victories.

Starting in the year 2000 Stockholm became allowed to participate with two teams., following an idea of the Stockholm Ice Hockey Association on its own after claiming to have so many skilled young players. and this concept has also been used later. In 2012 Småland also participated with two teams ("red" and "yellow") and so also in 2013. For the 2016 tournament the Swedish Ice Hockey Association decided to set up a new team, consisting of 22 players who'd been rejected from respective district association teams.

The 1997 edition aired over TV 3 as "TV-cupen".

A girls' tournament was added in 2019, replacing Stålbucklan.

Several "spinoff"-variations were later developed, like cross-country skiing's TV-skidan starting in 1965, but never gaining the same popularity as TV-pucken. Even other team sports have similar tournaments, often not airing over TV, where Swedish youth district teams challenge each other.

== Districts participating ==
There are 24 district teams divided in four groups participating in TV-pucken. Stockholm, the capital of Sweden, traditionally participates with two teams, which are named Vit (white) and Röd (red). In 2009, however, only one Stockholm team participated in the tournament.

| Group A | Group B | Group C | Group D |
|---|---|---|---|
| Gotland | Bohuslän/Dalsland | Gästrikland | Göteborg |
| Blekinge | Dalarna | Halland | Hälsingland |
| Småland | Norrbotten | Medelpad | Jämtland/Härjedalen |
| Värmland | Skåne | Örebro | Södermanland |
| Västmanland | Uppland | Västergötland | Västerbotten |
| Ångermanland | | Stockholm Röd | Östergötland |

== TV-pucken winners ==
=== Boys ===
Winners since 1959.

| Year | Winner | Runner-up |
|---|---|---|
| 1959 | Värmland | Stockholm |
| 1960 | Värmland | Dalarna |
| 1961 | Västerbotten | Värmland |
| 1962 | Dalarna | Stockholm |
| 1963 | Västerbotten | Ångermanland |
| 1964 | Västerbotten | Stockholm |
| 1965 | Ångermanland | Stockholm |
| 1966 | Dalarna | Stockholm |
| 1967 | Värmland | Västerbotten |
| 1968 | Värmland | Västerbotten |
| 1969 | Ångermanland | Stockholm |
| 1970 | Dalarna | Gästrikland |
| 1971 | Värmland | Ångermanland |
| 1972 | Västerbotten | Gästrikland |
| 1973 | Stockholm | Norrbotten |
| 1974 | Gästrikland | Medelpad |
| 1975 | Stockholm | Gästrikland |
| 1976 | Norrbotten | Dalarna |
| 1977 | Södermanland | Dalarna |
| 1978 | Stockholm | Västerbotten |
| 1979 | Småland | Värmland |
| 1980 | Västerbotten | Värmland |
| 1981 | Stockholm | Dalarna |
| 1982 | Södermanland | Västerbotten |
| 1983 | Stockholm | Dalarna |
| 1984 | Norrbotten | Dalarna |
| 1985 | Norrbotten | Skåne |
| 1986 | Stockholm | Gästrikland |
| 1987 | Skåne | Norrbotten |
| 1988 | Ångermanland | Stockholm |
| 1989 | Skåne | Dalarna |
| 1990 | Småland | Ångermanland |
| 1991 | Småland | Skåne |
| 1992 | Dalarna | Medelpad |
| 1993 | Ångermanland | Skåne |
| 1994 | Ångermanland | Skåne |
| 1995 | Dalarna | Värmland |
| 1996 | Dalarna | Värmland |
| 1997 | Stockholm | Södermanland |
| 1998 | Stockholm | Uppland |
| 1999 | Stockholm | Göteborg |
| 2000 | Värmland | Stockholm White |
| 2001 | Göteborg | ärmland |
| 2002 | Södermanland | Norrbotten |
| 2003 | Stockholm White | Gästrikland |
| 2004 | Stockholm A | Västmanland |
| 2005 | Värmland | Skåne |
| 2006 | Göteborg | Skåne |
| 2007 | Småland | Stockholm |
| 2008 | Småland | Västerbotten |
| 2009 | Stockholm | Skåne |
| 2010 | Stockholm | Småland |
| 2011 | Västerbotten | Dalarna |
| 2012 | Stockholm North | Gästrikland |
| 2013 | Västerbotten | Västergötland |
| 2014 | Värmland | Göteborg |
| 2015 | Ångermanland | Stockholm North |
| 2016 | Stockholm North | Stockholm South |
| 2017 | Skåne | Ångermanland |
| 2018 | Göteborg | Södermanland |
| 2019 | Stockholm North | Östergötland |
| 2020 | Stockholm North | Västerbotten |
| 2021 | Stockholm North | Stockholm South |
| 2022 | Norrbotten | Stockholm South |
| 2023 | Stockholm North | Södermanland |
| 2024 | Småland | Västerbotten |
| 2025 | Småland | Skåne |
| 2026 | Stockholm | Skåne |

=== Girls ===
Winners since 2019.

| Year | Winner | Runner-up |
|---|---|---|
| 2019 | Dalarna | Småland |
| 2020 | Småland | Stockholm |
| 2021 | Småland | Dalarna |
| 2022 | Stockholm | Småland |
| 2023 | Dalarna | Västergötland |
| 2024 | Västergötland | Södermanland |
| 2025 | Värmland | Dalarna |
| 2026 | Norrbotten | Dalarna |

== Statistics ==
| Team | 1st placed | 2nd placed |
|---|---|---|
| Stockholm A | 13 | 11 |
| Värmland | 8 | 6 |
| Dalarna | 6 | 6 |
| Västerbotten | 6 | 10 |
| Ångermanland | 6 | ? |
| Norrbotten | 3 | 3 |
| Småland | 5 | 1 |
| Södermanland | 3 | 1 |
| Skåne | 2 | 7 |
| Gästrikland | 1 | 6 |
| Göteborg | 2 | 2 |
| Västmanland | 0 | 1 |

== Popular culture ==
In Berts bravader, Bert states that a romance between him and his 56 years old counselor wouldn't work because talking old memories from the past would for Iris mean second world war, and Bert would talk about the TV-pucken final game of the previous year.
