= Berts ytterligare betraktelser =

1991 novel by Anders Jacobsson and Sören Olsson

- Author: Anders Jacobsson and Sören Olsson
- Illustrator: Sonja Härdin
- Cover artist: Sonja Härdin
- Language: Swedish
- Series: Bert
- Genre: Diary, Children's, Youth
- Set in: fictional town of Öreskoga, Sweden
- Published: 1991
- Publication place: Sweden
- Preceded by: Berts vidare betraktelser (1990)
- Followed by: Berts bravader (1991)

Berts ytterligare betraktelser (Swedish: Bert's additional contemplations) is a diary novel, written by Anders Jacobsson and Sören Olsson and originally published in 1991, it tells the story of Bert Ljung from 1 September to 31 December during the calendar year he turns 13. The book uses the 1989 almanac following the Gregorian Calendar. As standard, Bert opens the chapters with the words "Hej hej hallå dagboken!" and finishes with "Tack och hej – leverpastej". Bert writes diary for each day during this calendar year, and most notes depicts what happened yesterday.

Originally, the Berts betraktelser trilogy appeared in the radio program Almanackan during 1989, where one program was done each day during one year, which Sören thought was fitting well for a diary. During October 1989 Anders and Sören "sprinted" writing the final stories. When reaching the autumn stories, the writers tried to split up the storywriting, calling it "creative competition", trying to exceed each other with fun and surprise with something unexpected.

When the book was released in 1991, it was one of several books by the same writers. 1991 became both the writers' and the book publishing company's best year, saleswise, and the same year the television series Sunes jul was a success. Anders Jacobsson stated in the year 2000 that the book was his favourite Bert book. According to Sören Olsson it shared the first-place together with Berts bokslut.

== Book cover ==
The book cover shows Bert lying on his littered floor writing in his diary while eating popcorn, and listen to radio-tape recorder at high volume. On the floor is a cassette tape, leverpastej, stockings and photographs with girls. A heart symbol appears out of Bert's head, when he watches a photograph (turned to the other side, not revealing who the picture shows). A lamp lights up in the dark, and a dog-shaped telephone is ringing.

== Plot ==
The autumn term of the 7th grade at school has begun, and September has come. A fire erupts in Lill-Erik's locker at Beckaskolan. As only 7th grader, his locker is in the 9th graders corridor, and now he has to carry the school books in a shopping bag. Åke gathers a group trying to investigate the event. Bert, however, suspects Dödgrävarn, as he also suspects him being together with Paulina, seeing them visiting a cinema together. Bert notices watches in Dödgrävarn's locker, and he watches Dödgrävarn in class 7 B and Paulina. Bert begins to see Paulina as a "traitor". A week in September, it is revealed that Lill-Erik caused the fire. Fearing several 9th graders, he hoped to get a locker in the 7th graders' corridor. Some days later, he gets a locker in the 8th graders' corridor. Bert's interest in Paulina declines by mid-September, in favour of Ida, even if he dislikes Ida smoking. Ida shares locker with Lill-Erik, and even Ida's friend Mona smokes. Mona teases Bert for having glasses. Bert finds a notice at his locker, telling Bert is cute despite having glasses, and invites him to come to the bicycle parking one night. Not knowing who writes the letter, Bert never appears.

In September, Bert also ends up in a fight with Jörgen Karlsson in class 7 B at school, as Jörgen teases Bert. Åke also begins to expresses Communist opinions, and later through the book also talks about Earth being threatened to extraterrestrial threats. At school, Åke is often sent into the headmaster, (a recurring theme throughout the book).

Early October begins with Bert thinking less on girls, and more on hanging with the other guys. With problems to decide which girl to like, the starts to hang with the other guys in town on Friday and Saturday evening, ending in trouble with raggare. Bert also longs for moped. Åke tries to play the violin in the Heman Hunters, borrowing a violin from a music store. When the sound is bad, Åke attaches wires to the violin, which catches fire. Torleif tells Åke to migrate to Hungary, where the violin is often played.

Some 9th graders, among them Dödgrävarn's friend Karri, are forced to change school after forcing Inez, a girl in class 7 D, into the Beckaskolan basement to show herself naked. The police arrive, taking the 9th graders away from school. Some days earlier, Dödgrävarn has eaten a dinner with Bert at Bert's home.

Bert also goes to a cinema with his former girlfriend Nadja, but Bert is not let in, which Nadja is. Bert remains in the foyer, and after hugging, they both go home.

In Björna's recreation room, Bert, Åke and Lill-Erik are to meet three "hot" girls who Björna knows, but the date is cancelled when the girl learns Bert will attend. When Bert calls Nadja a few days later, her raggare brothers answer that she is at Paulina and his boyfriend. By October, Paulina has a boyfriend with a doodlebug tractor.

Friday, 27 October. After another fight at school between Dödgrävarn and Jörgen Karlsson, class 7 B has to skip PE and discuss the fighting. Instead, but guys and girls of Bert's class, 7 A, have PE together. During the PE lesson, Bert begins to show interest for Emilia, a girl in his class who has been there since the 1st grade, but always been in the "background", and who Bert has rarely cared for (except when they were playing table tennis in the third grade, and Bert said sorry for accidentally smashing the ball knocking her dental braces out). Emilia stares at Bert during the PE lesson.

Bert also meets Joel, a Christian youth leader riding a motorcycle, and Bert is allowed to ride on the back of the motorcycle.

When Bert returns to school after one week of fever between October and November, he larns that Emilia has asked for him and by November, Bert and Emilia often talk.

As weeks pass, December comes, with Advent, Saint Lucy's Day, Christmas and New Year. While the class celebrates the First of Advent, Bert watches Emilia in the candlelight, while Åke puts fire on his mathematics book protesting against his views on Christmas being "fascist hypocrisy", and he's forced to pay for a new one.

Bert continues his contacts with Emilia at school, and when he meets her in town, Emilia's mother thinks Bert is nice.

When Bert's class observes Saint Lucy, blond-haired Annika acts as Saint Lucy. Åke eats up all the saffron buns, and his friends toss snowballs on him. During the 9th graders Saint Lucy possession, Miranda acts Saint Lucy, and the 7th graders whisper "–Tant Miranda" ("–Lady Miranda"). When the Christmas break begins, Emilia wants to meet Bert during the holidays.

Bert's fathers brother, Janne, who lives in New York City in the USA, visits Sweden over the holidays. Janne gives Bert a videocassette recorder for Christmas, while Åke gives Bert a pet turtle who Bert names Ove. Between Christmas and New Year, Ove eats Bert's aquarium fishes. Bert's old grandmother on his father's side is to tired to arrive, and sends a letter instead.

New Year celebrations in Bert's family occur with his 18 years old cousin Sandra, and his mother's sister Lena and her husband Lars-Olov. Åke's family is also about to have a party, where Åke's father mimics jazz musician Milfred Cherry.

The book ends on 31 December with Bert thinking of calling Emilia and ask a Happy New Year and ask to get together, Probably, he doesn't dare since in the upcoming book Berts bravader, set the following year, Bert and Emilia officially go together by mid-year, after meeting several times before.

== Audiobook ==
Audio recordings were released to four cassette tapes by the Änglatroll label in 1993 entitled "Berts septemberbetraktelser"., "Berts oktoberbetraktelser"., Berts novemberbetraktelser och Berts decemberbetraktelser

=== Music and songs ===
The cassette tapes consist of following songs:

- September: "Dum i huvet", "Spanska röven", "Riv hela skiten", "Lill-Erik är krasslig" ("Ja till livet")
- Oktober: "Jag vill va' en prins", "Kul att få en smäll", "Banan-Boris", "Jag tror hon heter Emilia" (TV-låten)
- November: "Negrer är bra", "Inget krångel, mera hångel", "Höst och höst igen", "Heman Hunters" (Heja Sverige)
- December: "Jolijaapa", "Hej Lucia", "Nu är det jul", "Milfred Cherrey"

== Trivia ==
- In November, when Åke uses graffiti to blame the local ice hockey club for being racists not touching the "black puck", the word Öreskoga is mentioned for first time.
- Despite it has passed a while since Bert in Berts dagbok was ashamed at his worst for his name, he lies for Joel telling his name is Sam.
- The story with Åke and the violin also appears in the TV series, where it however is Bert who borrows it from the music store to impress on Nadja. Åke later destroys the violin when trying to help his friend.
