= Berts bravader =

1991 novel by Anders Jacobsson and Sören Olsson

- Author: Anders Jacobsson and Sören Olsson
- Illustrator: Sonja Härdin
- Language: Swedish
- Series: Bert
- Genre: Diary
- Set in: fictional town of Öreskoga, Sweden; Denmark; Gotland, Sweden
- Published: 1991
- Publication place: Sweden
- Preceded by: Berts ytterligare betraktelser (1991)
- Followed by: Berts bekännelser (1992)

Berts bravader (Swedish: Bert's exploits) is a diary novel written by Anders Jacobsson and Sören Olsson and originally published in 1991. It tells the story of Bert Ljung from 2 January to 1 January during the years he turns 14 and 15, covering the spring term in the 7th grade, the upcoming summer break, and the autumn term in the 8th grade.

The book uses the 1990 almanac following the Gregorian Calendar, but as chapters are only named after dates, this is mostly shown at Easter and Pentecost. As standard, Bert opens the chapters with the words "Tjena!" and finishes with "Tjena, tjena – mittbena". Bert writes diary for each week during this calendar year, not each day like the previous, but in turn the chapters are longer than in the Bert's betraktelser trilogy. It also aired over the Unga Efter tre radio programme back in the early 1990s.

== Book cover ==
The book cover shows a grass-piece next to the beach, where Bert is on a blanket, where he has placed a T-shirt with the text "Heman Hunters", and Emilia lies upon Bert's stomach. From under another blanket, two eyes show up. Further away, a little child runs towards the water with a plastic dinosaur. Two girls are sunbathing topless, while two guys watch. An older man also watches, trying to hide his watching from his wife behind a newspaper. At beachside, a macho guys tries to impress two girls. At waterside, bathing and boating recreation occurs. Sun is shining, and birds are moving in the sky. At the book title text, a bird that has caught a fish is seen. Under a black blanket, two feet appear, probably Åke who opposes Sunbathing in general. Also on Bert and Emilia's blanket is Bert's bag, and a pinup magazine. Rightmost are two flippers in the grass, and a frog is seen (Åke has two water frogs, Hasse and Lasse).

== Plot ==
The story begins on 2 January. Since last October, Bert is infatuated with a girl in his class named Emilia. Later in January, he mails her a letter, but forgets to change its crude finishing line. When he tries to retrieve it from the letterbox, he gets his arm stuck in the letter box while he ends up attacked by two younger children tossing snowballs at him as he tries to break free. Eventually, Bert successfully is assisted by Åke and Kurre from the petrol station to break fee. Bert remails the letter, but again forgets to change its crude finishing line.

Soon, Bert, Åke and Lill-Erik travel away by bus to go slalom skiing in the hills, but Åke rides a pulk and falls out into the skiing mogul slope before ending up at the hospital.

Later in January, to Berts surprise, Emilia thanks Bert for his letter. Having interpreted it as a name's day gesture, Emilia has read it to her parents (which Bert thinks is embarrassing), and now she asks Bert to help her with homework about the Instrument of Government of Sweden.

Throughout the year, Bert navigates typical teenage embarrassments: like a during a parent-free video night in March where Lill-Erik is left forgotten in Bert's parents' bed, and following Easter break, Bert accidentally tangles his finger in Emilia's bandage, dislocating her thumb. He's too mortified to apologize directly.

On 2 April, Lill-Erik walks over to Olga in class 5 C and asks to get together, and then tells her it's just an April fool. Olga replies with reminding him such jokes are only allowed on 1 April. During Easter, Bert notices his old female friend Paulina in town. Lill-Erik is not in sight, fearing the Easter Bunny. After the Easter break, Bert notices Emilia accidentally having cut herself in her finger during the break. When he tries to pat her and say something kind, he accidentally gets stuck with his own finger in her bandage, requiring Emilia to go with her arm in esmarch bandage for weeks, and words can't describe how much Bert wants to apologize.

Soccer season brings humiliation, as Bert's team loses three opening games in a row, as Åke recruits 9 year old named Charlie, who scores successes with the team. Åke recklessness continues on his birthday, he removes his bicycle's breaks and chain, crashing into a watchmaker's window. To avoid paying damages, he chops down a flagpole outside of the town hall in protest of "corruption".

During Pentecost, Emilia invites Bert to lunch at her parents' house on Pentecoast Monday. Bert accepts the invitation, and buys white carnations to Emilia's mother.

During summer, Bert takes his first summer job, as "ice cream guy" (Swedish: "glassgosse") at Bengtssons Café. Bert also goes to Denmark with his family. Bert is also out with his friends, and officially goes together with Emilia, following some summertime romances at the beach (who are also depicted on the book's back cover) and the town park. Bert's pet turtle Ove seems to have problems with Emilia, and poops her in her fist. Åke takes a summer job as a comedian at a factory, but is kicked out after telling jokes about unemployed people on the day after 500 employees had been fired.

When the 8th grade starts, Bert's class has family and consumer science, and after behaving bad towards the schoolteacher, Lill-Erik is only allowed theoretical education. By September, Bert and the other guys ride bicycle through town, calling themselves "Cykelgalningarna" ("Bicycle maniacs") and depict themselves as a "cool gang with rusty handlebars and without retroreflectors", who shout "–Halka-kalka". For his 14th birthday, Åke gets a moped (illegal to drive in Sweden before turning 15).

By October, Lill-Erik has gotten a girlfriend, 7th grader Hildur who has red hair and glasses, and even if Bert has Emilia, he thinks Hildur is cute. For a while, it seems like Lill-Erik is to move away when his father is offered better wages as a projectionist, but wage negotiations finally fail.

Bert's great grandmother Beda on Gotland dies on 14 October, and is buried on Gotland the upcoming week, Bert's family travel over to Gotland and attend the funeral. A Gotland native blows in a trumpet. By late October, the school nurse takes blood samples from the pupils of Bert's class do, where the guys are screaming to scare each other.

Bert does his PRAO at a local newspaper in November. Heman Hunters play at the "Hjorten" youth club, which Bert depicts in the newspaper, as "Treb Gnujl" (his own name written backwards). During the autumn and early winter, Bert also has a school test, and Bert's school also plays an ice hockey tournament with less success.

Later in December, Bert sends Emilia a poetry book, with love poems and blank pages where own poems can be written. Bert regrets writing: "Snoppen sitter på kroppen och mår toppen" ("The penis is on the body and feels great").

Dressed as Santa Claus elves, Bert, Åke and Lill-Erik go out caroling an afternoon. Åke has stolen a Red Cross collection box in November, and tricks people that the money are aimed at "charity", which actually is pieces to Åke's old moped.

On 22 December, the Heman Hunters hold a Christmas party. Torleif announces he will move, playing a funeral tune on his flute, as the entire band cheers. Torleif replies with kicking Åke out into the snow.

When the book ends, it's 1 January of the upcoming calendar year, and Bert tells about last night's New Year's party at Lill-Erik, whose parents aren't at home. Invited are Bert, Åke and 24 other people (among them Emilia and Torleif). Lill-Erik is worried for objects breaking apart. Lill-Erik is given an aspirin with rose hip soup, before being sent to bed by his own classmates. Bert and Emilia try to be alone, but Åke causs the electricity to go off, and Åke forces Bert to assist him holding a candle while Åke searches the telephone directory, finally finding a half-drunk electrician who fixes the power. The lights return at 00:15, everyone has missed the bells striking twelve, and soon everyone starts leaving.

Bert and Emilia walk home together in the New Year's night, and before splitting up for the night they give each other a delayed New Year's resolution, to always stay together for the rest of their lives. After kissing each other goodbye, they both continue walking in different directions, towards their own homes. Continuing home alone, Bert on his way spots a "very hot" girl outside the store "Harrys Plejs". Bert and the girl look upon each other, and Bert thinks of Emilia and finally comes to realize that probably never used to believe in the "nonsense" of New Year's resolutions after all.
