= Berts vidare betraktelser =

1990 novel by Anders Jacobsson and Sören Olsson

- Author: Anders Jacobsson and Sören Olsson
- Illustrator: Sonja Härdin
- Language: Swedish
- Series: Bert
- Genre: Diary, Children's, Youth
- Set in: fictional town of Öreskoga, Sweden; New York City, New York, United States; Jamaica
- Published: 1990
- Publication place: Sweden
- Preceded by: Berts första betraktelser (1990)
- Followed by: Berts ytterligare betraktelser (1991)

Berts vidare betraktelser (Swedish: Bert's further contemplations) is a diary novel, written by Anders Jacobsson and Sören Olsson and originally published in 1990. It tells the story of Bert Ljung from 1 May to 31 August during the calendar year he turns 13. The book uses the 1989 almanac following the Gregorian Calendar. As standard, Bert opens the chapters with the words "Hej hej hallå dagboken!" and finishes with "Tack och hej – leverpastej". Bert writes diary for each day during this calendar year, and most notes depicts what happened yesterday.

Originally, the Berts betraktelser trilogy appeared in the radio program Almanackan during 1989, where one program was done each day during one year, which Sören thought was fitting well for a diary. The stories were supposed to be more daring than before, but criticism was low.

== Book cover ==
The book cover depicts Bert, running around in his untidy room wearing only underpants, and holding his diary in his hands. In the room are also naked male angels, and clouds. One of the angels wears a cap, and uses bow and arrow, hitting the diary. The other angel plays the violin, and the music streams into Bert's ear and out comes the words "love", while three heart symbols appear above Bert's head. At Bert's writing desk is a gramophone record, and a photograph of Paulina. Next to the wall is Bert's half-broken electric bass. On the floor are Phantom comic books, and two eyes watch out of a rat hole.

== Plot ==
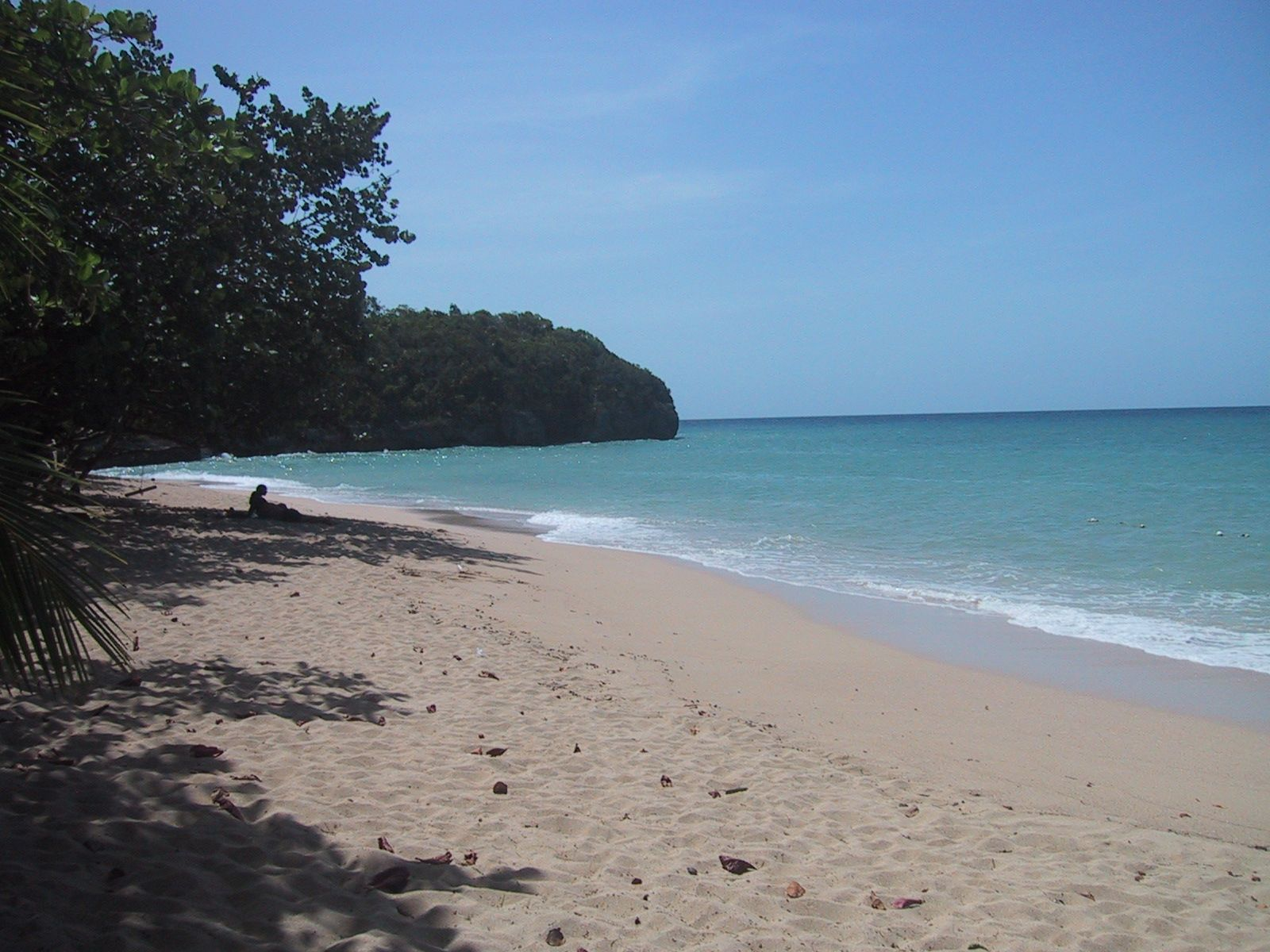
In the book, the Ljung Family goes on vacation to Jamaica.

On the night between 5 and 6 May, a fire occurs in Bert's hometown, destroying the potato warehouse " Arnes potatislager ". The local police suspects arson, and Bert suspects Jörgen Karlsson. Bert also visits his mother's sister Lena's dance institution. Paulina attends dancing courses there, and Bert accidentally drops Paulina into the floor.

Bert's school class also visited by the 6th graders from Östbergaskolan, as the classes will merge before the 7th grade, and Lill-Erik fears them being communists when their teacher calls them "comrades".

By late May, the 6th graders go to a school camp, after collecting money, and as Bert walks alone in the evening Paulina appears, and together they walk to a former open air dance platform, where a romance between them takes place.

During the 6th grade commencement at school, Åke launches his own firework in the school desk. The bench cover catches fire, and the schoolhouse is abandoned. On his way home, Bert meets Paulina, who wants to meet him during summer, and they soon go bathing together.

Åke's father has met a new woman, Hillevi who has Norwegian relatives, and Bert goes sailing with his father and a person called Christer, but turns seasick.

For Paulina's name day on 22 June Bert crochets a cloth, and as his caveman persona "Milton " he goes out and attaches the cloth to a stone, which he throws into Paulina's window. However, it falls into the wrong apartment, requiring Paulina's neighbour to hand over the present.

Following tradition, Bert and his relatives spend Midsummer in Babbsand, inside a cottage located on an island. When Bert comes home, he finds a letter under the hallway carpet, where Paulina has written a letter telling him to come to Lilla Bryggan during Midsummer Day (when he was Gone).

In July Bert's father's brother Janne, who lives in an apartment in New York City in the United States, has invited Bert's family to a holiday in Jamaica. But first, they must travel over to New York City, and the journey is done by aeroplane. When Bert hears of communists not being allowed into the US, he turns afraid when he knows his neighbour Olle Collin votes for VPK. The problems turn worse when Paulina's cousin Pavel from Czechoslovakia, a USSR ally state, is visiting Sweden. Because of poor US-USSR relations, Bert fears the US sending agents into Sweden and he also fears the US agents seeing Bert with Paulina and Pavel would risk Bert's entry permit to the US. Bert thinks he sees US agents inside a parked Televerket bus. Bert now must shows his support for the US, and calls the embassy of the US in Sweden, singing "Happy Birthday to USA", but the staff takes it for Russian folk songs. Bert bring the flag of the US to McDonald's, when a cigar-smoking man walks by, and the flag catches fire. The local newspaper depicts the event as a youth communist demonstrating outside McDonald's by desecrating and burning the flag of the US.

The trip finally occurs, and they also visit the Empire State Building. Then, they visit Jamaica. When Bert comes home, he receives postcards from Åke, who visits Norway and when they pick up their car at Bert's grandmother, Bert's father forgets that Sweden drives to the right side of the road since 1967, sending two moped riders into the ditches. In late July, Bert and Åke sleep overnight inside a ghost house.

In August, Bert spends a lot of time with his friends, before the 7th grade starts, including taking apples from foreign gardens. When bathing naked in the Nöckeln lake, Bert notices Louise being naked. Naked, he and Paulina hug each other. Bert also visits church secretly, asking God for forgiveness for thinking so much of girls.

When Bert begins the 7th grade, his class is merged with another one from Österbergsskolan. Bert gets a locker next to Dödgrävarn, who fills his locker with snuffboxes, throwing away books taking too much place, Lill-Erik's locker ends up in the 9th graders corridor, and he writes a letter to the headmaster to continue the 6th grade for another year. Bert's class gets Banan-Boris as chemistry teacher. In mathematics Agneta is their teacher, and Åke protests against home work, for "student democracy" and against "fascism", while Jaana throws the mathematics book out of the window. Åke is sent out of the classroom, and proposes occupation for the teachers' staffroom. By this time, Åke slowly begins to expresss Communist-like opinions.

During a floorball game during PE, Jörgen Karlsson and Dödgrävarn in class 7 B start fighting, and after one week Björna comes home to Bert, and they talk about school.

Bert also gets a visit from Nadja, when he feels down. She gives him a warming hug, but Bert soon falls in love with an 8th grade girl called Ida, but Bert dislikes her being a smoker.

The book ends with Bert doing his homework, and his mother says time has run so fast since his parents came home with him from the birthing center, and she wants to kiss him. Burt quickly runs into his neighbor Olle Collin's apartment to play the guitar.

== Later adaptations ==
- The school camp scenes also appear in the TV series episode "Fina, fina Paulina", expanded into a story where Lill-Erik is left behind by the bus after a break, and stumbles upon a runaway elephant out in the forest.
- Bert's 7th grade start also appears in the TV series episode "Ett långt och lyckligt liv", but in that adaption, Dödgrävarn is two years older than Bert.

== Trivia ==
- A coloured version of the image on page 96, where Bert goes behind Paulina at the Nöckeln lake beach, works as cover for the June cassette tape recording.
- Depicted as an Eastern state in the story, Czechoslovakia was still under communist rule during the mid 1989 radio broadcasting. The book version came out in 1990, after the Velvet Revolution.
- By the time of the release of the stories, it had not yet been revealed that the Bert books are set in Öreskoga, but when the Ljung family visits Jamaica, Bert asks his father how ÖSK plays at Allsvenskan.

== Audiobook ==
Audio recordings were released to four cassette tapes by the Änglatroll label in 1993 entitled "Berts majbetraktelser"., "Berts junibetraktelser"., Berts julibetraktelser och Berts augustibetraktelser

=== Music and songs ===
The cassette tapes consist of following songs:

- Maj: "Morgonfjong" (Multiman), "Heaven and Panncake", "Lill-Eriks hambo" ("Skalbagge hambo"), "Fina Paulina" ("Kom konkurrens")
- Juni: "Blekfet", "Samma sol, samma sommar", "Sailing" (same lyrics as the Sutherland Brothers's version, but the song's original love-based theme replaced with seasickness), "Min far gillar snusk"
- Juli: "Ajm a Goood at Linglish", "Fill it up to the Bread", "Jamaica Man", "Hemåt igen"
- Augusti: "Slå mig", "Alla pallar", "Vilde Bill", "Börja sjuan" ("Min bil")

Title within bracket refers to song title at the time of Hemliga Byrån's original recording.
