= In Ned's Head =

1987 novel by Anders Jacobsson and Sören Olsson

- Revised 1993 edition cover, includes a depiction of the original 1987 edition (albeit defaced)
- Author: Anders Jacobsson and Sören Olsson
- Original title: Berts dagbok
- Translator: Kevin Read
- Illustrator: Sören Olsson
- Cover artist: Anne Scatto
- Language: Swedish
- Series: Bert
- Genre: Diary, Children's, Youth
- Set in: fictional town of Öreskoga, Sweden
- Published: 1987
- Publication place: Sweden
- English publication date: 2001
- ISBN: 0-689-83870-0

In Ned's Head (Swedish: Berts dagbok, lit. 'Bert's diary'), is a diary novel, written by Anders Jacobsson and Sören Olsson and originally published in 1987. It tells the story of Swedish fifth-grader Bert Ljung during the spring term from 14 January to 4 June the year he turns 12. Being the first of the Bert Diaries, the term Berts dagbok has later also become a term for the entire Bert Universe.

Created to be older and tougher than Sune, the idea of writing as a diary novel was inspired by Barbro Lindgren's Världshemligt, but during the Gothenburg Book Fair a person appeared, stating the concept had been taken from The Secret Diary of Adrian Mole, Aged 13¾.

The episodes were originally written during the spring of 1986 for SR Örebro. Olsson was originally supposed to read the chapters before Jacobsson took over. When it was thought to sound too much like the authors' character Sune, Sören took over again.

Bert keeps a secret diary. The dates follow the 1987 calendar and each chapter ends with the line Klart slut – varulvstjut ('over and out, werewolf howl').

The book is the most popular Bert book outside Sweden (as of 2009).

== Book cover ==
The original 1987 book cover is blue, with a white skull and crossbones. The 1993 revised and expanded edition (pictured) depicts Bert sitting with the 1987 edition in his hand, with the word Berts crossed out and replaced with Trebs. Calendar pages fall in the background, and two heart symbols are depicted, with the names Nadja Nilsson and Rebecka, and the text Rebecka crossed out. Bert wears a green sweater, and in the air are also the words Mr. Walker and Klart slut – varulvstjut.

== Plot ==
The book opens with the words:

Död åt den som tjuvläser denna dagbok. Må han brinna i fasans eld i all evighet... eller i varje fall en liten stund.

translated:

Death to the one who reads this diary in secret. May he burn in the fires of Hell forever... or at least for a short time.

Berts dagbok is set during the spring term in the 5th grade, and runs from 14 January to 4 June. Bert, in class 5A at Beckaskolan, is ashamed of his name, and originally uses the Treb Walker persona. Treb is Bert backward; Walker comes from The Phantom, whose name is Kit Walker. Bert also writes his own stories about the hero Kobåj-Kurt. Bert and Åke also invent their own fictional country, Hoppalotjingien, which later in the book ceases to exist following a "civil war".

When the book opens, Bert is in love with Rebecka in class 5B and turns to red pencil each time he writes about love. During Bert's 12th birthday party in late February, Klimpen tricks him into smacking Rebecka's butt with a rubber snake, and she walks home. This is followed by a period in late February when Bert does not care much for girls at all, creating more space for other plots. Among them are Åke Nordin "experimenting" on his little sister Doris, who he tricks into drinking a "dishwashing liquid drink", class 5A playing soccer against class 5B, and Bert's sight problems being discovered. When Bert gets glasses, he is teased by Klimpen.

During a Friday evening school dance event in May, Bert falls in love with Nadja Nilsson in class 5E at Jungberska skolan. Torleif tells Bert that she plays the violin in the same orchestra, and that she lives near the soccer ground in a little cottage with her mother and three brothers.

Bert calls Nadja and talks to her, originally using Åke's name. Bert's grandmother says that being kind and polite allows you to get wishes from God, and Bert puts on his best clothes, looks out the apartment window, and wishes to get together with Nadja Nilsson. Bert thinks that God twinkles with a star.

During the next school dance, Torleif tells Bert's name to Nadja, but they manage to agree to meet.

As the 5th grade reaches its end, it is announced that Klimpen will move to Motala.

During an experiment, Åke manages to set fire to the remaining pages of Bert's diary. The book ends with Bert and Nadja meeting in the town park on 4 June under an old oak tree, and on its trunk, they carve their initials (NN + BL). In the end, Bert announces his real name, Bert Ljung, and that Treb Walker is no more.

== Original edition and revision ==
Sören Olsson illustrated the original edition, as he did with Sune. It was the only Bert book illustrated by him, and the 1993 reissue was illustrated by Sonja Härdin.

The 1993 reissue has more chapters and has been altered to work better with later books, mentioning aspects appearing in later books. For example, Lill-Erik's move from Sundsvall is depicted, and Emilia Ridderfjell appears in the background, despite the character originally being created for Berts ytterligare betraktelser, where it is stated that she has been Bert's classmate all along. The reissue also first mentions her last name, Ridderfjell, for the first time. The 1993 reissue opens with a review of class 5A at Beckaskolan, and it is here Bert's schoolteacher's name (Sonja Ek) is mentioned for the first time; she was previously referred to as fröken ("Miss").

== Later adaptations ==
The book introduces a number of features of the Universe of Bert, including the family, his neighbors, and the party. The party, which has become a famous scene, also appears in the TV series in the episode "Närkontakt i sjätte klassen", and the comics. Lill-Erik's arrival to the class has also become famous, despite not appearing in the original version. However, it appears in both the TV series and the comics. First, everyone thinks Erik is a tough guy who can beat up Klimpen, called Stor-Erik or Erik the Great after kings in Sweden, or the Vikings.

The story where Bert's myopia is discovered, leading to him getting glasses and getting teased by Klimpen, also appears in the episode "Den ohyggligt fule" of the TV series. However, the series does not use the "bauta bacillus" that is supposed to have given Bert myopia.

The 1993 reissue also includes a school discothèque with a masquerade ball, which has become famous and appears in the TV series episode "Min älskling, du är som en tulipan" and the comics.

The Bert comic album Charmör på danshumör is based on Berts dagbok.

== Audiobook ==
Audio recordings were released to cassette tape in 1991 by the Änglatroll label entitled Berts dagbok and Berts dagbok om Nadja. There is no music, except the sung opening lines Min dagbok, Berts dagbok.

== Translations ==
In 2001 the book was translated into English by Kevin Read, as In Ned's Head, with the closing lines "Bye, Bye Apple Pie". Geographical places were relocated, and names transliterated becoming Nadia and Rebecca, while Klimpen become Nugget. For example, Canada defeats the USA in an ice hockey game, while the original tells of Sweden losing to Finland.
