= Bert Diaries =

Swedish children's-youth diary novel series by Anders Jacobsson and Sören Olsson

- Berts dagbok Bert och brorsorna Bert och Boysen; Bert och bacillerna Berts första betraktelser Berts vidare betraktelser Berts ytterligare betraktelser Berts bravader Berts bekännelser Bert och badbrudarna Berts bekymmer Berts bryderier Berts befrielse Bert och beundrarinnorna Bert Babyface; Berts bokslut
- Author: Anders Jacobsson and Sören Olsson
- Illustrator: Sonja Härdin
- Cover artist: Sonja Härdin
- Country: Sweden
- Language: Swedish
- Genre: diary novels
- Publisher: Rabén & Sjögren
- Published: 1987–1999, 2005-

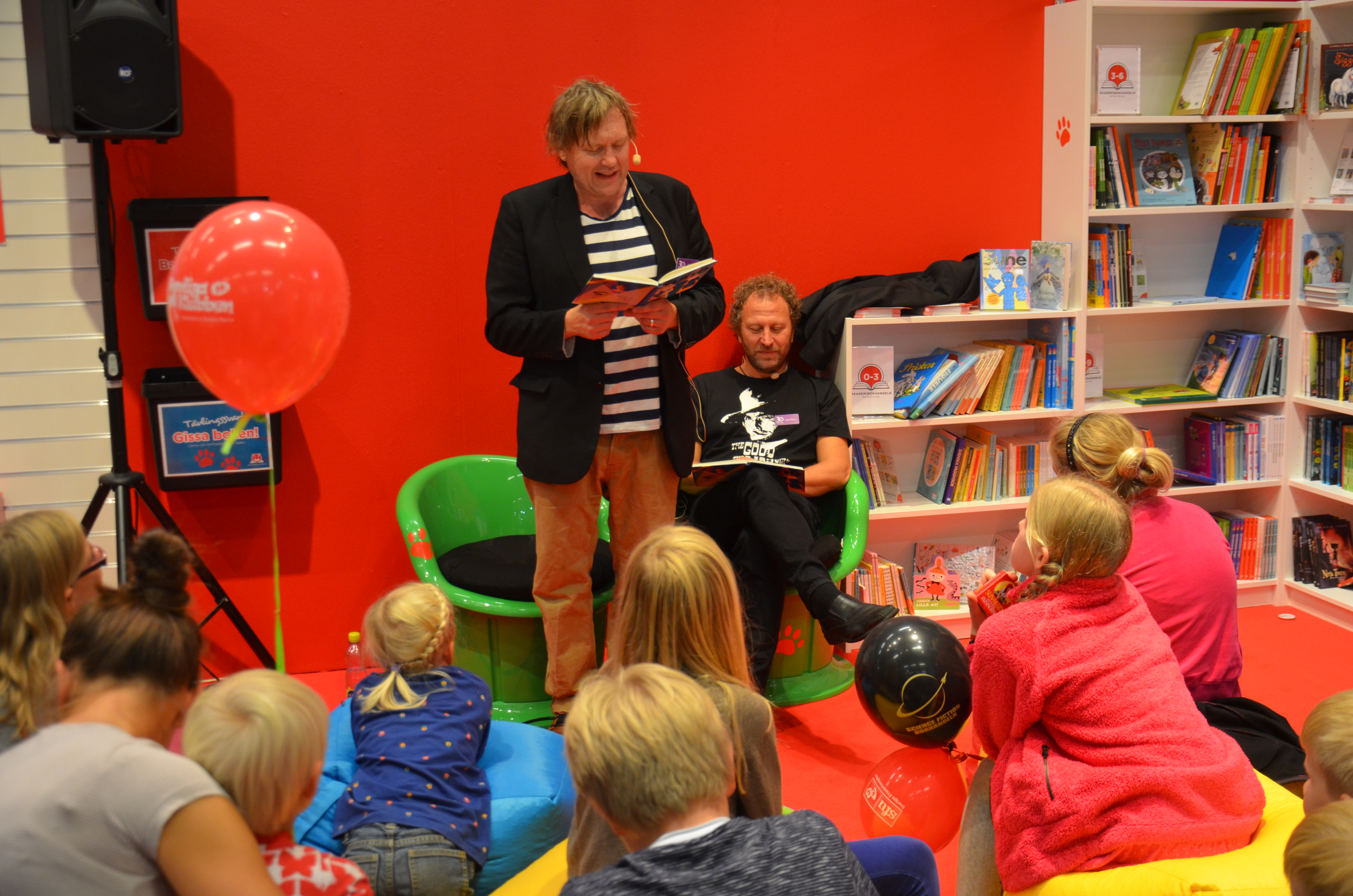
The author reading his book to a young audience

The Bert Diaries are a series of novels written in the form of a diary, by Swedish writers Anders Jacobsson and Sören Olsson. The main character is a Swedish teenager called Bert Ljung, living in Öreskoga, a fictional town in Sweden, in the late 1980s and early 1990s. The first book came out in 1987. Bert and his friends also have a pop/rock band, the Heman Hunters.

A TV series was made in 1994, directed by Tomas Alfredson and Svante Kettner. It was followed by a feature film in 1995, also directed by Alfredson. In late-July 2016 the filming of a new Bert film was announced.

Between 1993 and 2002, a comic book, FF med Bert, was published and between 1992 and 1999, comic albums were published.

== Main characters ==
=== Bert Ljung ===
Bert Ljung is the main character, the only son of optician Fredrik Ljung and bus driver Madelene (née Olsson). Bert starts as a 12-year-old child in the spring term of the 5th grade but later becomes a mischievous teenager discovering his own sexuality. From the book Berts första betraktelser, the readers can learn that Bert Ljung was born on February 21, 1976, but there are a lot of anachronisms, with the later books largely following a floating timeline. His family is also depicted in the books. In Berts bryderier, Bert tells the tale of his paternal great-grandfather Vladimir Livanov, who hailed from Saint Petersburg and made glasses, before building a raft and paddling with his hands and ending up in Gotland, where he married Beda (who dies on October 14 in Berts bravader). They had a son - Bert's paternal grandfather Stanislav Livanov, who after being teased for his name, changed his name at 18 to Sten Ljung. He married Märta Öberg, and they had two sons - Fredrik, and his younger brother Janne, who became a successful businessman in New York City. Janne visits Bert and his family over Christmas in Berts ytterligare betraktelser and again in Berts befrielse, and Bert visits him in NYC with family in Berts vidare betraktelser and on his own in Bert Babyface. His religious maternal grandmother Svea Olsson also makes a lot of appearances in the books. Bert plays the electric bass, sings and writes songs in the amateur rock band Heman Hunters (changed to Population Station Groovy WY in Berts befrielse and after a mistake made with posters, to 13 kor och en spann (13 Cows and a Bucket in Swedish) in Bert och beundrarinnorna). He also plays soccer for the amateur team Öreskoga-Kamraternas Idrottsförening, before quitting in Bert och beundrarinnorna. Bert is also interested in mopeds, which in Sweden, one is allowed to drive at 15. He gets a Crescent Trampis moped in Berts bekännelser, before selling it in Berts befrielse.

=== Åke Nordin ===
Åke Nordin is Bert's best friend. His mother died, suffering from cancer, when he was 7 years old. While Bert is interested in girls, Åke is more interested in science, carrying out dangerous experiments with chemicals on his little sister Doris. Åke is the Heman Hunters' electrician and overall technician.

=== Torleif Andersson ===
Torleif comes from a family depicted as "intellectual". Torleif likes classical music, and plays the flute and the keyboards in the Heman Hunters. He moves to Helsingborg at in January in Berts bekännelser, but makes a brief return a few days later. Bert, Åke and Erik meet him again in Helsingborg in Berts bokslut.

=== Erik "Lill-Erik" Linstett ===
Lill-Erik is the weak guy. He plays the accordion or the drums in the Heman Hunters. Before his arrival from Sundsvall, rumors make everybody think he is the strong "Stor-Erik" or "Erik the Great" who is able to beat up Klimpen. He has a fear of girls, after he showed his penis to his cousin at 5 years old and she told him it looked like a worm. Despite that, he had been on dates in later books.

=== Rebecka Molin ===
Rebecka Molin is the first girl Bert is in love with, which occurs in the mid 5th grade when the book series start. Her last name appears in the 1994 TV series.

=== Nadja Nilsson ===
Nadja Nilsson is a girl born in the autumn in Värmland, and lives with her mother in a cottage. She plays the violin. Her brothers are raggare (basically greasers). Bert falls in love with Nadja in May in the 5th grade, and they come together in June. On 1 March in the 6th grade, Bert breaks up with Nadja. They briefly get together again in Berts befrielse.

=== Paulina Hlinka ===
Paulina Hlinka is a girl from what was then Czechoslovakia. When her cousin Pavel visits Sweden in Berts vidare betraktelser, Bert is scared that secret US agents will spot them, and prevent him visiting his uncle Janne in New York City due to the poor relationship between the US and the USSR, as Czechoslovakia was a USSR-allied state. Bert is in love with Paulina from mid-late 6th grade to early 7th grade, before she leaves him for Dödgrävarn ("gravedigger" in Swedish). Bert later bumps into her in Bert och beundrarinnorna, but as he smells bad, she makes an excuse that she has to get to woodshop class.

=== Emilia Ridderfjell ===
Emilia Ridderfjell is a girl who Bert falls in love with in October in the 7th grade. She's performing well att school, has good a behaviour, and her parents are medical doctors. On 1 March in the 8th grade, Emilia breaks up with Bert. While Emilia has been a classmate of Bert since starting the 1st grade, Bert doesn't discover her until he falls in love with her, almost 6 and half year later. Before, she has just been a name on a paper, and a schooldesk in the classroom, except when Bert says "–Sorry" to her in the 3rd grade for accidentally smashing a table tennis ball hitting her dental braces, knocking them out. In Berts bravader, Bert states that liking her is not without social risk (something Bert is always very keenly aware of), since most guys in his class consider her being a wimpish type for having good grades, fine manners and ironed clothes.

She also appears in the Bert comics, and two cousins, one is named Lovisa from Gothenburg, and another cousin named Antonia Ridderfjell.

=== Klas "Klimpen" Svensson ===
Klimpen is a stereotypical tough guy, who fights, and no one wants to be a friend with. His father has a raggare car. He moves to Motala after the 5th grade. He later briefly returns to Öreskoga in Berts bekymmer, this time soliciting religious donations. Bert, Åke and Erik encounter him in Mjölby in Berts bokslut.

== Öreskoga ==
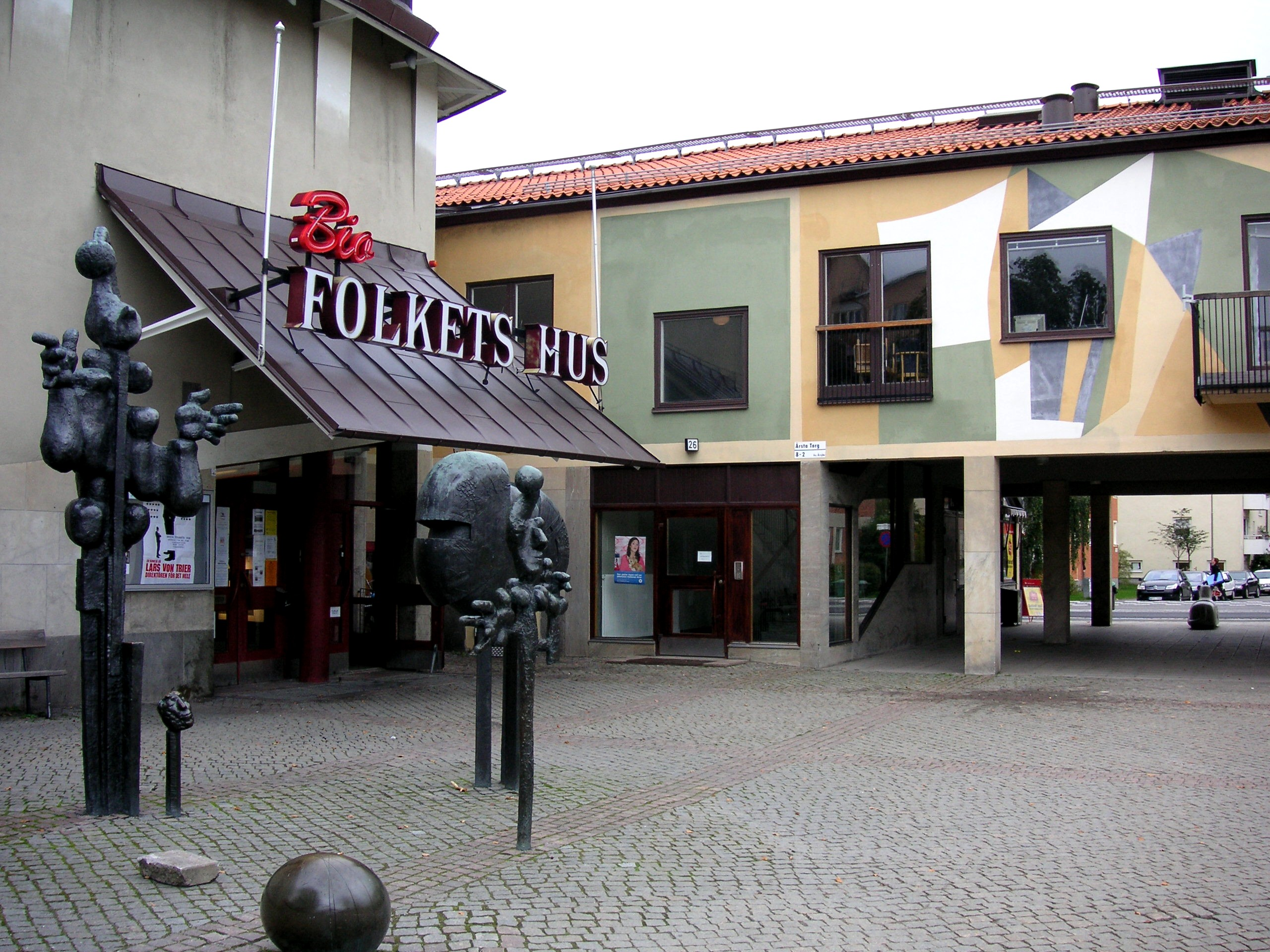
The square in the district of Årsta in Stockholm, here 2007, acted as a town square in Öreskoga in the 1994 Bert TV series.

Öreskoga is a fictional town in Sweden, where most of the novels and TV series take place. Bert Ljung lives in Öreskoga, at Klosterstigen 18. In the books, he lives in a three floors high house with six flats, while he in the TV series live in a high-rise apartment building, similar to those in Hagalund. The name Öreskoga is a portmanteau of the hometowns of the authors of the Bert-diaries - Sören Olsson's hometown, Örebro, and Anders Jacobsson's hometown, Karlskoga. Öreskoga is located somewhere between Karlskoga-Örebro. It's not mentioned in which municipality Öreskoga is, but Berts vidare betraktelser and Berts bravader refer to local government official "Svante Brylén". Berts bryderier refers to a newspaper named Öreskogas Allehanda.

Outside Öreskoga is the lake of Nöckeln, where Bert and his friends are swimming and bathing in the summertime. The cover of the book Bert och badbrudarna depicts Bert swimming in the lake. Öreskoga also has a town park, where Bert and Nadja meet below the old oak at the end of Berts dagbok, and where Bert and Emilia walk together in the summertime in Berts bravader.

=== Schools ===
==== Beckaskolan ====
Beckaskolan is a school with the grade levels 1-9 where Bert and his class friends are. The comics often depicts a try squared schoolhouse. The 1994 TV-series shows the "mellanstadium" and "högstadium". Someone has written "bögstadium" (Swedish: gay stage) at the front door.

In the books, class 6 B, Bert's class, has 15 pupils. Klass 6 from Östbergsskolan, consisting of 14 pupils, is merged with Bert's from the 7th grade. The class is then 7-9 A.

In Berts bekymmer, the school is named as the most moldy school in Sweden.

Teachers:

- "Banan-Boris", Bert's högstadium (High School) chemistry
- Malte, Henrik Strutz, head teacher
- Sonja Ek, Berts' mellanstadium (Middle School) teacher

==== Blåsjöskolan ====
Jungbergska skolan is a mellanstadium school, and Gabriella's school, some kilometers away from Bert's hem. In Berts bekännelser Bert, who is then in the 8th grade, travels there by moped to meet Gabriella who's in the 6th grade. He is disguised as a substitute. From the 7th grade she switches to Beckaskolan.

==== Jungbergska skolan ====
Jungbergska skolan is a 1-6-school, and Nadja's school. In Berts första betraktelser, a disco occurs at the school. In the TV series a violin concerto occurs at the school.

From the 7th grade, Nadja switches to Beckaskolan.

==== Österbergsskolan ====
Österbergsskolan is the school for the pupils who from the 7th grade are merged with Bert's class.

=== Sports ===
In Öreskoga is the sports club Öreskoga-Kamraternas Idrottsförening, where Bert plays soccer, and the name is mentioned in Bert och brorsorna. The boys' team is led by soccer manager Gordon. Berts vidare betraktelser depicts the team playing "Böljas BK". In Berts bravader, Åke recruits 9 year old Charlie to the 14 yer old's team.

In Öreskoga is also Öreskoga Ishockeyklubb, which Åke blames for racism not touching the "black puck" in Berts ytterligare betraktelser, in Berts bryderier they play Bollehult. There is also an annual mass participating running event named Motionstrampen.

== List of books ==
=== Old version ===
- Berts dagbok (Bert's Diary) - 1987, new edition in 1993
- Bert och brorsorna (Bert and the Brothers) - 1995
- Bert och Boysen (Bert and the Boys) - 1996
- Bert och bacillerna (Bert and the Coodies) - 1997
- Berts första betraktelser (Bert's First Reflections) - 1990
- Berts vidare betraktelser (Bert's Further Reflections) - 1991
- Berts ytterligare betraktelser (Bert's Additional Reflections) - 1991
- Berts bravader (Bert's Exploits) - 1991
- Berts bekännelser (Bert's Confessions) - 1992
- Bert och badbrudarna (Bert and the Swim Chicks) - 1993
- Berts bekymmer (Bert's Worries) - 1994
- Berts bryderier (Bert's Embarrassments) - 1995
- Berts befrielse (Bert's Liberation) - 1996
- Bert och beundrarinnorna (Bert and the Admirers) - 1997
- Bert Babyface (Bert Babyface) - 1998
- Berts bokslut (Bert's Closure) - 1999

=== New version ===
- Bert och kalla kriget (Bert and the Cold War) - 2005
- Bert och Heman Hunters (Bert and the Heman Hunters) - 2006
- Bert + Samira = Sant? (Bert + Samira = True?) - 2007
- Bert Badbojen (Bert the bath boy) - 2008
- Bert och ryska invasionen (Bert and the Russian Invasion) - 2009
- Bert och datadejten (Bert and the Computer Date) - 2010
- Bert och friheten (Bert and Freedom) - 2011
- Bert får scenskräck (Bert gets stage fright) - 2012
- Bert och frestelsen (Bert and the temptation) - 2012
- Berts fejsbok (Bert's Facebook) - 2013
- Bert och skrynkliga tanten (Bert and the wrinkled lady) - 2014
