= Raggare =

Car-centered subculture beginning in the 1950s in Sweden and Northern Europe

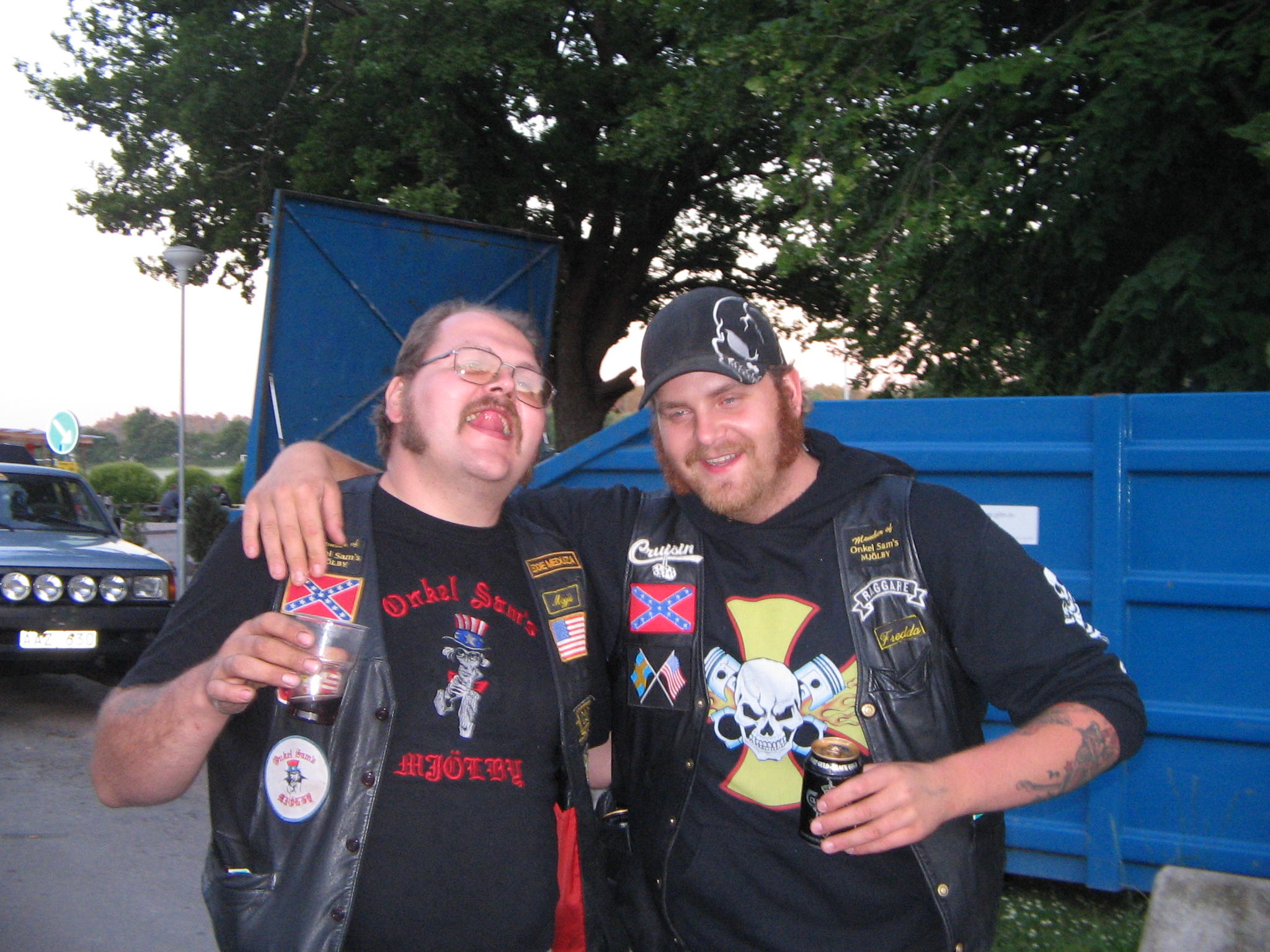
Two stereotypical raggare at the Power Big Meet 2005

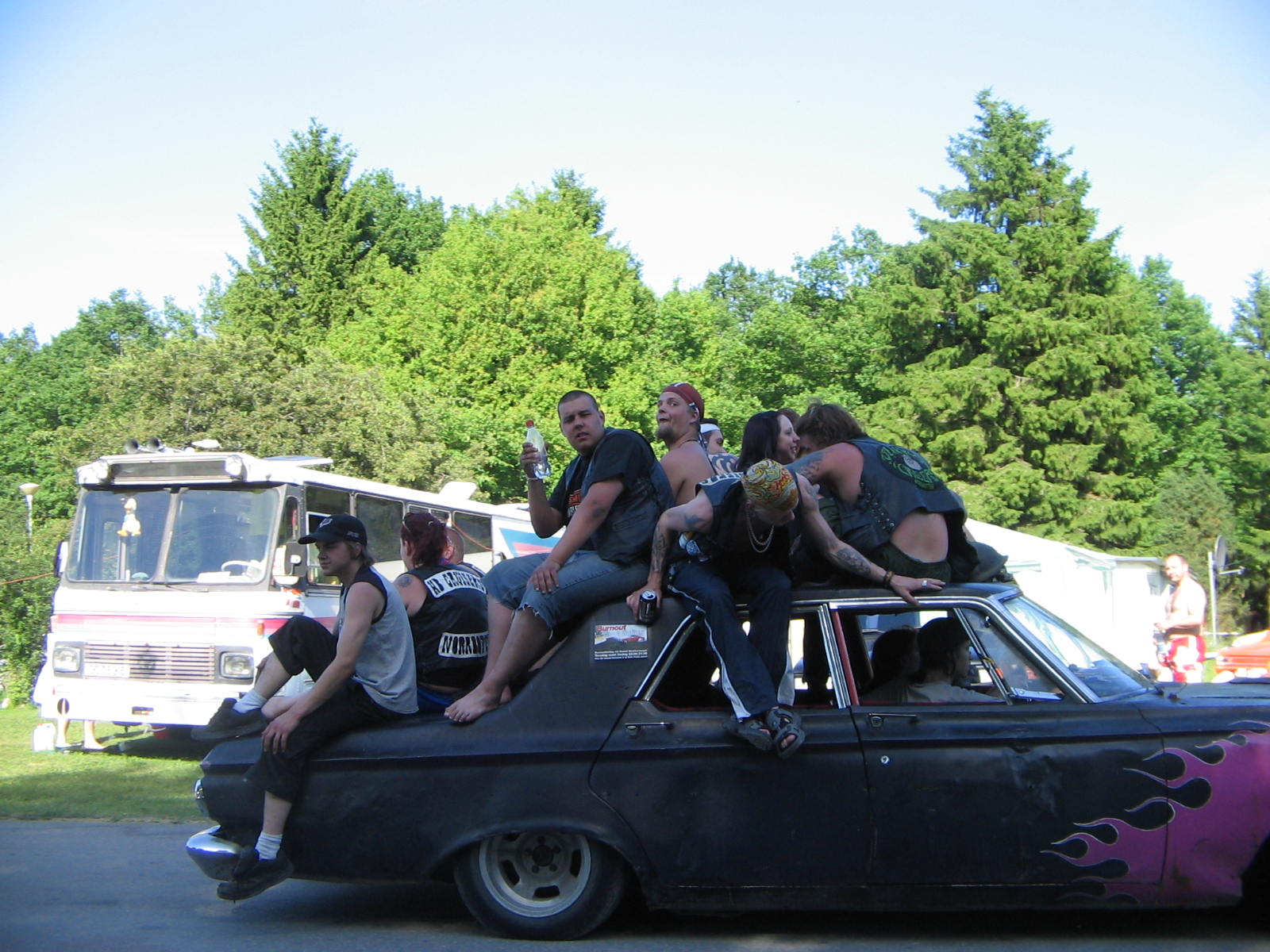
A lot of raggare on the roof of a 1960s car during Power Big Meet in 2005

Raggare is a subculture found mostly in Sweden and parts of Norway, where they are known as Råner, and in Finland. Its influences are American popular culture of the 1950s, such as the movies Rebel Without a Cause with James Dean, and American Graffiti. Cars are an important part of the subculture, especially V8-powered cars and other large cars from the United States. The display of the battle flag of the Confederate States is popular in the subculture. Formation of the raggare culture was aided by Sweden staying neutral during World War II and untouched by the war.

== Description ==
=== Influences ===
The Raggare subculture's influences are American popular culture of the 1950s, such as the movies Rebel Without a Cause with James Dean, and American Graffiti.

=== Cars ===
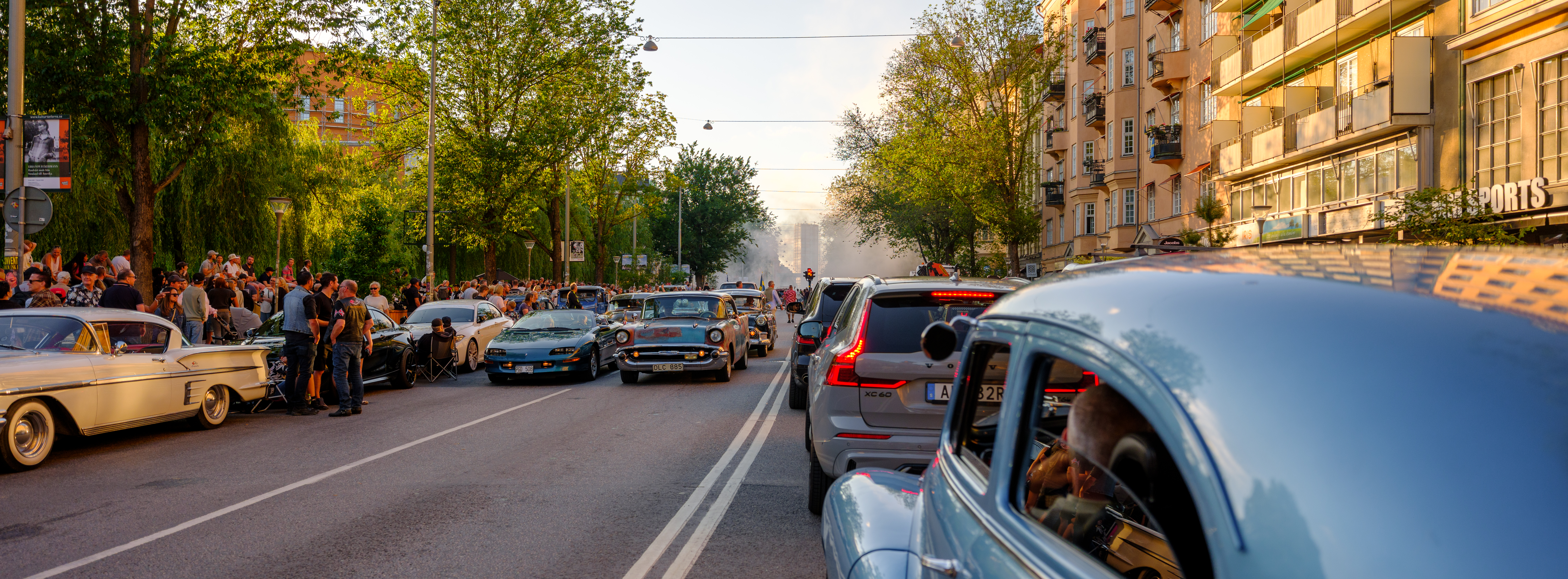
Cruising on Sveavägen in Stockholm

Cars are an important part of the subculture, especially V8-powered cars and other large cars from the United States. Raggare have been described as closely related to the hot rod culture, but while hotrodders in the US have to do extensive modifications to their cars to stand out, raggare can use stock US cars and still stand out compared to the more sober Swedish cars. Some raggare also drive European cars from the 1950s, 1960s and the 1970s.

According to an estimate by one Swedish car restorer, there are more restored 1950s American cars in Sweden than in the entire United States and although only two 1958 Cadillac convertibles were originally sold in Sweden there are now 200 of them in Sweden. Between 4000 and 5000 classic US cars were at one point imported to Sweden each year.

The latest generation of raggare, the so-called pilsnerraggare such as the club Mattsvart who was the subject of the 2019 documentary "Raggarjävlar" ("Greaser scum") do not show much interest in restoring vintage cars, instead opting for driving around in trashed old US cars, drinking alcohol and playing loud music, not necessarily the rockabilly and classic rock traditionally preferred by raggare. Many of them often instead drive old rear-wheel drive domestic Volvo models, such as 240 or 740. Teenage raggare usually start out driving cars legally classified as "EPA-tractors", which by regulations have their maximum speed limited to 30 km/h. Minimum driving age in Sweden is 18, but EPA-tractors can be legally driven by 15-17-year olds.

=== Fashion ===
The clothes and hairstyle are that of 1950s rockabilly. Blue jeans, cowboy boots, white T-shirts, sometimes with print (also used to store a pack of cigarettes by folding the sleeve) and leather jacket.

=== Symbols ===
The display of the battle flag of the Confederate States is popular in the subculture, as followers view it as a symbol of rebellion and American culture.

== History ==
Formation of the raggare culture was aided by Sweden staying neutral during World War II and untouched by the war. As a result, Sweden's infrastructure remained intact and the export economy boomed, which made it possible for the working-class Swedish youth to buy cars, in contrast to most of Europe, which needed to be rebuilt.

When raggare first appeared in the 1950s, they caused a moral panic with concerns about the use of alcohol, violence, high-speed driving, and having sex in the back seat. Raggare gangs were seen as a serious problem. The film Raggare! covered the issue in 1959.

One especially infamous raggare gang was Stockholm-based "Road Devils", formed in the late 1950s by Bosse "Gamen" Sandberg (1939-1994), which was very heavily publicized in the press. The name of the gang originated from a 1957 movie Hot Rod Rumble, which featured a gang by the same name.

Later, raggare often got into fights with hippies and punks, something described in the punk rock song "Raggare Is a Bunch of Motherfuckers" by Rude Kids. The Hjo band Reklamation was forced to cancel a gig after threats from raggare. Also, Rude Kids was forced to cancel a sold-out gig as the police didn't have the manpower to offer protection against raggare. When Rude Kids played in Stockholm the police had to bring in seven police cars to stop the raggare. When The Stranglers played in Sweden, their followers were caught making Molotov cocktails, and the police intervened after a fight broke out.

In 1996, the Swedish post office issued a stamp featuring raggare.

== Public image ==
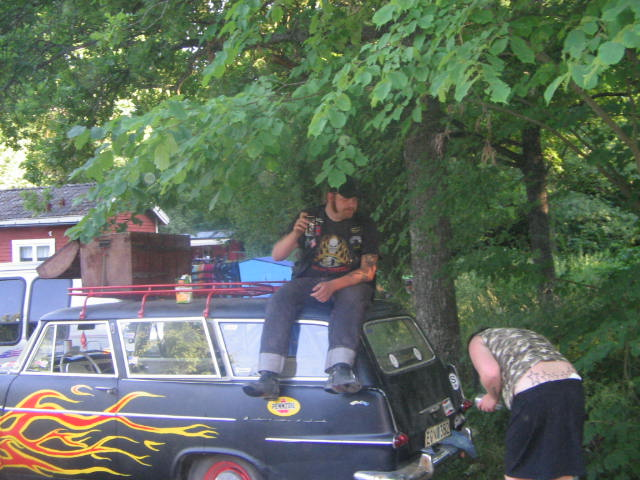
Raggare with customised Opel Rekord P2, a popular choice due to its resemblance to the Cadillacs of the late 1950s

Because of their mostly rural roots, retro-aesthetics and attitude towards sex, raggare are often depicted as poorly educated and financially unsuccessful. A famous example is the 1990s TV series, "Ronny and Ragge", a pair of stereotypical raggare who cruise around in a beat-up Ford Taunus. There are several periodic gatherings for raggare around Sweden. The Power Big Meet is the most famous, and is also one of the biggest American car meets in the world.

== In the media and other popular culture ==
- In 1975, then glam rocker Magnus Uggla made the song "Raggarna", which was a tribute to the culture. When he was performing live in late 1970s and early 1980s, raggare threw rocks and tried to thrash the arena in which Uggla performed, accusing him of being a punk rocker due to his success with the more punk-oriented albums he released in the late 1970s.
- Eddie Meduza have performed songs like "Punkjävlar" ("Punk Bastards"), or "Ragga runt," a tribute to the Raggare subculture.
- Rude Kids made a song about raggare (later re-recorded by Turbonegro) called "Raggare Is a Bunch of Motherfuckers", as an answer to "punkjävlar" by Eddie Meduza. The large number of punk songs about raggare shows the conflict between the two subcultures.
- The 1959 film Raggare! was about raggare and the moral panic of the time.
- The TV series Ronny and Ragge is about two raggare who cruise around in a beat-up 1976–1994 Ford Taunus.
- Onkel Kånkel made a song about raggare behaviour during cruising called "Åka femtitalsbil" (later covered by Charta 77).
- The early Swedish punk band P.F. Commando has issued a song called "Raggare" on their 1978 Svenne Pop 7-inch EP
- Raggargänget (1962) with Ernst-Hugo Järegård and Sigge Fürst
- Massproduktion published a compilation album titled Vägra Raggarna Bensin – Punk Från Provinserna.
- On 1 May 1979 about 100 punks formed their own parade down Kungsgatan under the slogan "Vägra raggarna bensin" ("Refuse the raggare gasoline").
- Nadja's brothers "Roffe", "Ragge" and Reinhold, Bert
- Tjenare Kungen (2005)
- In Welcome to Sweden, Bengt is a raggare, and delighted to meet his niece's American boyfriend because of it.
- Raggarjävlar (2019) is a documentary about the new generation of raggare in the club Mattsvart from Köping
- In the 2025 novel Punished by the Swedish-Sámi author, Ann-Helén Laestadius, Jon-Ante grows up to be a raggare in the Kiruna area during the 1980s, going by the name Jonne to hide his heritage.

== See also ==
- Car subcultures like Kustom Kulture, and more generally the Import scene
- Biker subcultures like the rockers in the UK the Bōsōzoku in Japan, and Chicanos in the US
- Stereotypes like the Harry in Norway, Gopniks in eastern Europe and rednecks in the US
- Youth cultures, like Nozem in the Netherlands, and Teddy Boys in the UK
- Americanization relating to the assimilation of American and Canadian cultures into a pan-European soil.
- Politically inspired subcultures, like Neo-Confederates, Nazi chic, and Skinheads
