= Sonja Härdin =

Swedish illustrator

- Born: 1945 (age 80–81)
- Notable work: Bert; Kamratposten school coursebooks Trafik-Trolle

Sonja Härdin, born 1945, is a Swedish illustrator. She illustrated all Bert books in the old series, except for the first Bert book, even if she illustrated the reversion edition, and she gave Bert and the other figures their characteristic looks after Sören Olsson had illustrated the original book. From Berts bekännelser the style was changed, with darker images. She has also illustrated articles in Kamratposten and school coursebooks like Nya Min matematik, which is a series of mathematics books for Swedish elementary schools. She has also illustrated Trafik-Trolle.
