= T. Sventon praktiserande privatdetektiv =

- Genre: children
- Created by: Åke Holmberg
- Based on: Ture Sventon
- Directed by: Torbjörn Ehrnvall; Birgit Hageby
- Starring: Helge Skoog; Lena Nyman; Nils Moritz; Johan Ulvesson
- Narrated by: Jan Blomberg
- Theme music composer: Björn Linnman
- Country of origin: Sweden
- Original language: Swedish
- No. of seasons: 1
- No. of episodes: 24

Original release
- Network: SVT1
- Release: 1 December – 24 December 1989

Related
- Liv i luckan med julkalendern (1988); Kurt Olssons julkalender (1990); T. Sventon och fallet Isabella

T. Sventon praktiserande privatdetektiv ("T. Sventon, Practicing Private Investigator") is the Sveriges Television's Christmas calendar in 1989.

== Plot ==
The stories are based on the books about private investigator Ture Sventon, his secretary Miss Jansson and the villain Ville Vessla. The adventures take place at various places around the world, including Lingonboda, the Arab world, London and Stockholm.

== Video ==
The series was released to VHS in 1992 and to DVD in the year 2000.
