= Agaton Sax =

Fictional Swedish detective

Paperback cover of "Agaton Sax and the Diamond Thieves", published by Target Books in 1973, with a characteristic illustration by Quentin Blake.

Agaton Sax is the protagonist of a series of Swedish-language humorous detective novels written for children by Swedish author Nils-Olof Franzén and illustrated by Åke Lewerth. Quentin Blake illustrated the English editions.

The novels are an ironic pastiche of the detective genre: for example Agaton Sax's colleague, the hapless Inspector Lispington of Scotland Yard, is clearly modelled on Inspector Lestrade of Sherlock Holmes fame. Like Holmes, Sax smokes pipes (in his case Meerschaums); he has one for every day of the week, which he smokes when thinking. Franzén was also inspired by another children's books detective in Sweden, Ture Sventon by Åke Holmberg. Altogether, eleven books were published in Sweden, and all but one were also published in English translation.

As with many foreign language novels translated into English, the style and idiosyncrasies of the translations were quite important to the popularity and success of the English editions. Unusually, Franzén did most of the English translations himself, working with a supplemental translator, Pamela Royds, on stylistic choices, which was a significant factor in preserving the humour of the original Swedish versions into the English translations.

The British series was immensely popular, and as a result, became the "most re-issued detective/mystery series in the history of Nordic children’s literature in British translation for the period 1950–2000."

The publication order in English was very different to that of the original Swedish editions, and the fact that the author himself mostly prepared the translations enabled revisions to be made which reflected the order in which he translated them.

In 2022 UK publishers Oak Tree Books released new editions of the 10 Agaton Sax books, the first republishing of the series since the Target paperbacks in the 1970s. Translated by Kenton Hall, and with new illustrations, the series will include the 11th Agaton Sax book, never before published in an English language version. The series has also been adapted into audiobooks for the first time.

According to a footnote in Agaton Sax and the Criminal Doubles, Franzén originally wrote the stories for his son.

== The books ==
| Swedish title | Published | English title | Published |
|---|---|---|---|
| Agaton Sax klipper till | 1955 | Agaton Sax and the Big Rig (revised) | 1976 |
| Agaton Sax och den ljudlösa sprängämnesligan | 1956 | Agaton Sax and the League of Silent Exploders | 1974 |
| Agaton Sax och vita möss-mysteriet | 1957 | Agaton Sax and the Haunted House | 1975 |
| Agaton Sax och de slipade diamanttjuvarna | 1959 | Agaton Sax and the Diamond Thieves | 1965 |
| Agaton Sax och det gamla pipskägget | 1961 | Agaton Sax and the Scotland Yard Mystery | 1969 |
| Agaton Sax och Byköpings gästabud | 1963 | Agaton Sax and the Criminal Doubles | 1971 |
| Agaton Sax och bröderna Max | 1965 | Agaton Sax and the Max Brothers (a.k.a. Bank Robbers) | 1970 |
| Agaton Sax och den bortkomne mr Lispington | 1966 | Agaton Sax and the Colossus of Rhodes | 1972 |
| Agaton Sax och de okontanta miljardärerna | 1967 | Agaton Sax and the Cashless Billionaires | 2022 |
| Agaton Sax och den svällande rotmos-affären | 1970 | Agaton Sax and the London Computer Plot | 1973 |
| Agaton Sax och den mörklagda ljusmaskinen | 1978 | Agaton Sax and Lispington's Grandfather Clock | 1978 |

== Characters ==
Agaton Sax

The protagonist in the series, Agaton Sax, is described as a pleasant, round Swede with a moustache. As well as running his detective agency, he also runs the local newspaper, the Bykoping Post (strapline: First with the News - The Smallest Paper - but the Best.)

Sax's dachshund Tikkie and Aunt Matilda help him track down criminals such as Octopus Scott and Julius Mosca. He is a master of underwater ju-jitsu and of several obscure languages. He is an early adopter of the computer for crime-solving purposes, though Aunt Matilda dismisses it as his "confuser". He has no known love interests and a pronounced dislike of garlic. Sax is also reminiscent of Hercule Poirot with his round body, hat and moustache.

Chief Inspector Joshua Lispington

Inspector Lispington often emerges in Sax's crime-fighting as a hapless, and clumsy hindrance. While well-intentioned, and always Sax's friend, Lispington seems out of his depth, often mishandling dangerous situations.

Aunt Matilda

Aunt Matilda cares for Agaton, providing him food and company in her old age. Matilda is often underestimated, and can be quite an adversary – usually armed only with basic household objects. Her umbrella is her favourite weapon of choice.

Tickie

Agaton Sax's dachshund occasionally joins Agaton in crime-fighting. Well trained, Tickie is normally quite helpful.

Clever Dick ( Tänkande August )

Agaton Sax's futuristic computer, which he built himself to assist in crime solving. Aunt Matilda refers to it as a 'confuser'.

Sergeant Antonsson

Acting head of the Bykoping Police, he frequently assists Sax and Lispington in their investigations.

== Adaptations ==
Three of the novels were adapted for television in the UK between 1972 and 1981, broadcast as segments of the BBC children's series Jackanory, with Kenneth Williams as the storyteller. Each was presented as five 15-minute episodes, in which Williams read an abridged version of the book (although it was more than a simple reading: being an experienced comedy actor, Williams performed the characters individually from the script, using just his voice and facial expressions). His performance was inter-cut with the illustrations by Quentin Blake published in the British editions of the books. The first to receive this treatment was Agaton Sax and the Max Brothers in October 1972, adapted by Jeremy Swan, followed by The League of Silent Exploders in February 1978 (which was repeated in April 1979), and Lispington's Grandfather Clock in October 1981 (this last getting a repeat for Christmas in December 1982).

Also in 1972, a four part animated television series was produced in Sweden, again based on the book Agaton Sax and the Max Brothers. Adapted by Peggy Miller, it was aired by the BBC in April 1976 under the title Agaton Sax, with actor Peter Hawkins – a well known BBC performer, including the voices of Captain Pugwash – voicing the characters. All of these changes—namely, the 4-year delay in transmission, the removal of the original title, and the substitution of Peter Hawkins for Kenneth Williams—were designed to conceal as best as possible the fact that the production was simply a remake of the 1972 Jackanory serial which had been based on the same book.

A 77-minute animated film Agaton Sax och Byköpings gästabud was made in Swedish in 1976, with a plot loosely based on Agaton Sax and the Criminal Doubles. An English-language version was broadcast in the UK by the BBC in August 1978, adapted by Daphne Jones, under the title Agaton Sax and The Feast at Bykoping, and once again featured Kenneth Williams voicing all the characters. Adapted in 3 parts of 25 minutes each, it aired just six months after the transmission of Williams' second Jackanory serial, The League of Silent Exploders, and was repeated in August 1979.

In connection with the film, a three part TV series aired on Swedish television, with the three installments based on Agaton Sax and the League of Silent Exploders, Agaton Sax and the Scotland Yard Mystery and Agaton Sax and the Colossus of Rhodes respectively.

This further series was not adapted by the BBC. However, in 1983, the BBC repeated the earlier 3-part adaptation The Feast at Bykoping with Kenneth Williams, from August 1978, for a second time: this time calling it simply "Agaton Sax" — presumably in an effort to conceal how many repeats it was getting, since in April 1985 this same adaptation was repeated for a third time, i.e. its fourth transmission altogether, on this occasion retitled yet again, now known as Agaton Sax: The Feast of Bykoping.

Overall, and including all repeats, the Agaton Sax adaptations totalled 40 broadcasts on BBC1, between the initial transmission on October 9, 1972, and the final repeat, aired on April 5, 1985. This coincided with the character's surge in popularity in the UK, due to the publication of the English translations in book form, both paperback and hardback, between 1965 and 1978.
