= Håkan Bråkan & Josef =

- Directed by: Erik Leijonborg
- Screenplay by: Lars Lundström based on Anders Jacobsson and Sören Olsson books
- Based on: Sune books by Anders Jacobsson and Sören Olsson
- Produced by: Waldemar Bergendahl
- Production company: SF
- Distributed by: SF
- Release date: 8 October 2004 (Sweden)
- Running time: 82 minutes
- Country: Sweden
- Language: Swedish

Håkan Bråkan & Josef is a Swedish comedy film which was released to cinemas in Sweden on 8 October 2004, directed by Erik Leijonborg and based on Anders Jacobsson and Sören Olsson's stories about Håkan, a Sune spinoff character.

== Actors ==
- Axel Skogberg - Håkan
- Jonas Karlsson - Josef
- Leo Holm - Sune
- Per Svensson - Rudolf
- Tintin Anderzon - Karin
- Emma Engström - Anna
- Ella Widmark - Isabelle
- Johan Rheborg - Ragnar
- Petter Westerlund - Ronny
- Henrik Hjelt - Larsa
- Rolf Skoglund - Zoo shop cashier
- Miranda Nord - Sophie
- Bisse Unger - Pär
- Henrik Lundström - Ludde
- Rachel Mohlin - choirleader

== Production ==
Recordings began in the Stockholm district by late-August 2003, only to later continue in Trollhättan.

== Soundtrack ==
The original film soundtrack was released to CD in 2004.

== Home video ==
In 2005 the film was released to DVD and VHS and in 2011 it also became available in the "Håkan Bråkan-boxen" box set, consisting of both the TV series "Håkan Bråkan" and the film Håkan Bråkan & Josef.
