= Självklart, Sune =

1986 children's book by Anders Jacobsson and Sören Olsson

- First Edition
- Author: Anders Jacobsson and Sören Olsson
- Illustrator: Sören Olsson
- Language: Swedish
- Series: Sune
- Genre: Children's, youth
- Set in: Fictional town of Glimmerdagg, Sweden
- Published: 1986
- Publisher: Hegas
- Publication place: Sweden
- ISBN: 91-86650-22-X
- Preceded by: Sune börjar tvåan (1985)
- Followed by: Sune och Svarta Mannen (1989)

Självklart, Sune (Swedish: Of course, Sune) is a children's chapter book, written by Anders Jacobsson and Sören Olsson and originally published in 1986. It continues the story of the fictional schoolboy Sune Andersson.

The tetanus needle stories told by the children in one of the chapters have been used within higher education to describe children's fear of tetanus needles.

== Plot ==
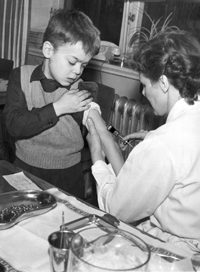
Children's fear of hypodermic needles is one of the topics tackled in the book.

Sune now has a little sister, Isabelle. Sune thinks she is "cute" despite screaming worse than Tarzan. Håkan wants his parents to go back to the birthing center and replace her with a baby that does not cry so loud. Sune also holds his first party, with "loud" music, "cute" girls, dancing and playing Post Office.

Sune's class at school becomes the first 2nd grade class go for a tetanus shot, and rumors spread of two needle-related deaths in the previous year, and other horrors. Joakim does not need a shot, because he got one last year when bitten by a dog. He tells stories about the needle being one meter long, and a hammer being used. Sune tries to avoid the shot, forging a note from his mother saying her son does not need an injection. Finally, the nurse has to declare it is perfectly safe, and that it is more dangerous not to get a shot.

Sune and Håkan also go to the hairdresser. Sune feels so ashamed over his shorter hair that he tries to use adhesive tape to attach the hair again. At school, he does not end up being teased so much for his short hair as he feared.

The Andersson family also attend an entertainment evening, which end up embarrassing for Rudolf as Håkan and Sune take him to the stage.

Sune and Joakim have a secret tree house with a pin-up girl picture in the groves of the Andersson family's garden, and they believe nobody knows about the tree house, but one day Rudolf plans to clear the groves. Sune and Joakim tell him not to destroy the trees, and when Rudolf wonders why, Anna declares that Sune and Joakim have a tree house there. With the secret revealed, Sune and Joakim think the tree house is no longer fun. They decide to give it away to Håkan, but first they will sleep there overnight as a goodbye ceremony. When Håkan becomes sad because of not being allowed to sleep in the tree house overnight, he hopes the monsters in the garden will eat them up; he says he has seen a total of 37 monsters. Joakim and Sune hear sounds in the woods, which they think could be a monster elk or one of the 37 monsters Håkan mentioned. Joakim tries to calm down Sune and says no monsters exist, at least not in Sweden and a town full of cars, and Sune believes they have been exterminated by getting hit by trucks.

No monsters show up, instead comes Håkan. Håkan discovers the pin-up girl pictures. When Håkan asks why she is naked, Sune and Joakim reply it is from a doctor's journal, since when visiting the doctor clothes are removed. But Håkan replies that if they do not let him into the game, he will reveal that Sune and Joakim have a pin-up girl picture. They let Håkan into the game, and Håkan plays a strong hero, while Sune and Joakim play stupid bad guys. Finally Anna shows up and tells them that it is too cold to sleep in the tree house overnight, and instead they go indoors, to sleep in beds.

When the summer vacation comes, many are sad because they will not see each other again after the break. Anna will leave the 6th grade for the 7th and will not meet her schoolteacher anymore. But when Sune, who will leave the 2nd grade for the 3rd, is about to sing Idas sommarvisa he cannot recall what blossoms (which is the flowers, in Swedish: "blommorna"), and forgetting the song lyrics, he sings "Jag gör så att koskiten blommar" ("I make the cowdung blossom").

Everyone who has been sad becomes glad again.

== Audiobook ==
Audio recordings were released to cassette tape in 1989 Änglatroll entitled "Sunes första party". och "Sunes självklarheter".
