= Sune och Svarta Mannen =

1989 children's book by Anders Jacobsson and Sören Olsson

- Author: Anders Jacobsson and Sören Olsson
- Illustrator: Sören Olsson
- Cover artist: Sören Olsson
- Language: Swedish
- Series: Sune
- Genre: Children's, Youth
- Set in: fictional town of Glimmerdagg, Sweden
- Published: 1989
- Publication place: Sweden
- ISBN: 91-29-59170-8
- Preceded by: Självklart, Sune (1986)
- Followed by: Tjejtjusaren Sune (1989)

Sune och Svarta Mannen (English: Sune and the dark man) is a chapter book, written by Anders Jacobsson and Sören Olsson and originally published in 1989. It tells the story of Sune Andersson during the autumn term year in where he turns 9. The book was the first written by Anders and Sören all together. Several of the church- and Christmas-based stories were used for the 1991 Swedish TV Advent calendar Sunes jul.

== Plot ==
Sune is a 3rd grader at Söderskolan, and the book opens with depicting the Andersson family. The opening chapter closes with Sune thinking back on what happened during the summer that past behind, when he was to a summer camp. The book then jumps backwards, depicting Sune and Joakim going to camp, for Sune it's the first time and he has been to a hike before and thinks it'll be fun, but Joakim has been to hikes before. The camp lasts for six days, and is split up in different hikes with circa 60 children aged 6–14. Sune and Joakim are to canoeing, and Joakim says there are crocodiles in the water, who have to be hit with the paddle, and when Sune says no crocodiles exist in Sweden Joakim insists. Joakim's mother Siw drives Sune and Joakim in a car to "Byholmen", a place in the woodlands where the camp will occur. Rumors say "Svarta Mannen" ("Dark Man") is there, pulls up tent pegs, frightens children with "hemlängtanbaciller" ("homesickness bacilli") and poisons the food. Sune thinks maybe camp leader Ulrik Bengtsson is Svarta Mannen. At the camp are also Simon, Jannika and Mirriam. During the first evening, twilight falls och Sune means he has seen Svarta Mannen in the woods, but camp manager Britt-Marie Rävberg says he doesn't exist, that it's just imagination and that homesickness can affect anyone. Sune now realizes that Joakim has made up the Svarta Mannen to avoid confessing his own homesickness. During the rest of the weak everything is fun, nobody talks of Svarta Mannen and not even when the canoe turns over hand his hair is filled with seagrass, Sune longs home.

The book then continues with depicting Sune and Sophie kissing each other alone, when Håkan and Pär try to spy. They start a club, with the only ambition to reveal what Sunes and Sophie do. When Sune and Sophie are gone, Håkan and Pär hide in the wardrobe with a camera and a tape recorder. Sune and Sophie hear snoring from the wardrobe, and Sune think it's Svarta Mannen, but instead it's Håkan and Pär who have fallen asleep, and since that day, Sune and Sophie always check out the wardrobe first.

In the autumn, the Andersson family go on a trip to an old castle to learn more history. Anna is not allowed to bring her boyfriend Lars-Olof. A bus appears and drops off schoolchildren next to a petrol station where the Andersson family stop, and Sune shows interest for Åsa Smörgåsa, who gives Sune a blown kiss. Sune offers Svenne (in the bus) two ice cream to change place, and Sune jumps into the bus, and Svenne goes into the Andersson family's car. Everything is revealed, Karin and Rudolf signal to the bus driver, who stops the bus. The trip continues, but is never depicted.

When it's Sophie's birthday, Sune goes by bus into town to buy a present. After first believing he has ended up at the concert hall instead, as a man plays the accordion, he soon learns he is at the right place, the department store. Sune goes to a toy store where two guys check a cap gun that Sune purchases, and forgets the money for Sophie's present, a pink cloth cat. Sune steals the cloth cat and puts it in his inner jacket pocket, when discovering the store using camera surveillance. Sune is ashamed, but pays for the cap gun and nobody notices him stealing the cloth cat. Sune takes the bus home, and rings on Sophie' s doorbell and says he stole the cloth cat, while Sophie means he's a criminal, is ashamed and believes he will end up in prison. Sophie declares that's not the case, but stealing is outlawed in Sweden and that Sophie tells him to return the cloth chat, that she doesn't want. She also wants him to never do it again, or else she'll not be his best friend anymore. Sophie goes with him, and gives the table cloth and the cap gun to the store manager, so he can buy the cloth cat. The store manager pays he difference, five kronor, for Sune being "honest and brave", and having "such a kind and clever girlfriend .

When Saint Lucy's Day approaches, Sune puts a boot as a star boy hat, and sings "Sankta Lucia, skänk mig en tia. Tian var trasig, lucian var knasig" ("Saint Lucy, give me 10 crowns. The 10 crown bill was broken, Saint Lucy was scatty "). The music teacher runs towards Sune and tells him to take the boot off, he doesn't need to wear a star boy hat. But when singing "Staffan var en stolledräng" ("Stephen was a fooly farmworker boy") he is sent to the classroom to draw, and soon the other students arrive to do Christmas decoration. Sune paints the headmaster, sitting in the sauna wearing a star boy hat at his private area. Sune puts the drawing at the headmaster's office door. Everyone laughs, and the headmaster rushes into the classroom, telling Sune drawing a star boy hat was unnecessary.

Sune's little sister Isabelle is baptized in church, and Rudolf fears the name will be wrong. Anna declares that her religious studies-teacher has said baptism doesn't mean getting a name, but rather joining the parish. Since church is also called the "House of God" Sune thinks of God, and thinks of the church paintings as a comic book, while uncle Göran videotapes the baptism. The priest is female, Anna-Lena. When a sound from the church organ comes after being touched by Håkan, Sune turns worried for his little sister being baptized "Bröööl" (his perception of sound coming from the organ) fearing she'll be teased at school, but everyone just laughs. During the upcoming coffee break, they put on the videotape, but Göran took the wrong film, and instead a Tarzan movie appears on the screen, but Tarzan's shouting remind of the church organ's "Bröööl" sound.

Rudolf says he's been offered a new job for a bigger company, getting better paid, if they move 15 miles away after New Year. In the other town lives Conny Bertilsson, and the Andersson's family met the Bertilsson's family last summer. The school in the other town is called Adolfinaskolan, next to a brook referred to as "Missipissifloden" ("Mississippi River"). Conny tells tall stories over the new school. Sune thinks he'll miss Sophie, and when he tells it she turns sad and starts crying, even if they will sometimes be able to see each other again. Because they think of marrying each other, they write a marriage contract, with Gud as witness. When not being able to agree over how many children they'll get, they call it their first marriage quarrel, and after that they kiss each other.

The Andersson's family visits the new town, where they purchase a new house. Sune meets the Pär and Pål twins, who sing a swearing song, and Bengt-Göran, who Conny calls a "tattarunge" ("romani kid"), but Sune thinks saying that is stupid. This chapter also introduces the new school class, and the teacher Marie.

Sune says goodbye to his old school class and gets a hug from Maria Perez, before going home baking gingerbread. Sune and Håkan fight, and Anna gets tired on them. Sophie shows up, and declares that tomorrow she will go to Småland and celebrate Christmas with her grandmother and grandfather on her parents' side, and will not return again until 5 January. Sune will move on 3 January. Both turns sad, but give each other Christmas presents, and Sune gives Sophie a diploma and a farewell poem for Sophie, and the final picture shows Sophie within a heart symbol and the words "Sophie for Ever" (in English).

== Audiobook ==
Audio recordings were released to cassette tape by the Änglatroll label in 1990 on entitled "Sune och svarta mannen"., "Stjärniga gossen Sune". and "Sune gifter sig".

The tape "Sune och Svarta mannen" consists of the stories "Sunes familj", "Sune ska på läger", "Den mystiska totempolen" och "Miriam" on side A and the stories "Fotspåret", "Svarta mannen" and "Hemlisen" on side B. while the tape "Sune gifter sig" consists of the stories "Sune", "Nyheten" "Sune gifter sig" on side A and the stories "Conny Bertilsson" and "Sunes farväl" on side B.
