= Sagan om Sune =

Swedish children's novel

- First edition
- Author: Anders Jacobsson and Sören Olsson
- Illustrator: Sören Olsson
- Language: Swedish
- Series: Sune
- Genre: Children's, youth
- Set in: Fictional town of Glimmerdagg, Sweden
- Published: 10 December 1984
- Publisher: Hegas
- Publication place: Sweden
- ISBN: 91-86650-10-6
- Followed by: Sune börjar tvåan (1985)

Sagan om Sune (Swedish: The Tale of Sune) is a Swedish children's chapter book, written by Anders Jacobsson and Sören Olsson and originally published in 1984. It tells the story of Sune Andersson during the spring term of the 1st grade at school in Sweden. Anders originally wrote the stories when doing his military service, while Sören illustrated. Originally, the stories aired over SR Örebro, the radio station in Örebro.

The book is one of the titles in Tusen svenska klassiker, a book listing a thousand significant Swedish cultural works chosen by journalists Jan Gradvall, Björn Nordström and Ulf Nordström.

== Plot ==
Sune Andersson is 7 years old, and attends the 1st grade. Sune is a so-called tjejtjusare ("girl charmer"), but mostly he likes Sophie in the same class at school. They have known each other since being very small. Despite hanging with Sophie, Sune also goes to school, plays with his friend Joakim Fröberg, and fights with his little brother "Håkan Bråkan", who for example has bitten the legs off Sune's Donald Duck toy figures. The book opens with a presentation of the main characters.

One Friday when walking to school, Sune gets "Goddag, goddag-sjukan", a disease where the affected can only say "God dag, god dag" ("Good day, good day"), even if the disease always comes to an end later. Sune writes a note to his mother. When coming to school, Sune tries to avoid answering questions. He is exposed during the Swedish lesson, when required to answer a question. His schoolteacher said she cured the disease with curiosity.

In the nearby forest, a "war" (using cones) has broken out during a break, where the 1st graders and the 2nd graders fight the 3rd graders. Sune is about to free Daniel, but ends up in trouble with 3rd grader Bengt, who chases him until he is saved by the bell.

Sune also hangs out with Sophie, and one morning Håkan wakes him up by tugging on his lashes. Håkan also breaks Sune's guitar apart. Sune responds by throwing pillows.

During their own time, the children play ball games at the apartment blocks, and even older kids attend the games, including those from the higher stage of the Swedish primary school. Cathrin Åkerlund in class 5 A counts, och captures several people, but when capturing Sophie Sune tries to free her. Sune kicks the ball, which crashes into the apartment of a man called "Gäckande skuggan". He has sailed the seas, and rumors say his wife and children have disappeared. Joakim requires Sune to go picking up the ball. Sophie is not afraid and goes with Sune, and it soon turns out there is no "Gäckande skuggan", just Alvin Hjalmar Edwin Gren who is not dangerous at all. He tells about his seaman life, and about being thrown into prison in Tunis after fighting with a Greek over a girl, and that it was his wife and children who left him. Sune feels pleased over knowing the truth.

When Sune's school class go to swimming lessons, they travel by bus to the pool. Sune feels ashamed of not knowing how to swim, and when the class is split up between pupils who know how to swim and those who do not, he lies and reports himself to the wrong group and mimics swimming. When the swimming instructor orders them out to deep water, it is revealed Sune cannot swim. The swimming instructor has to save Sune's life and Sune says not knowing how to swim is silly, but nobody agrees, and just say the entire point of swimming lessons is learning how to swim. Sune is sent back to the minor pool.

Finally, summer arrives and Sune and his classmates complete first grade.

== Audiobook ==
Audio recordings were released to cassette tape by SR Örebro entitled Sagan om Sune and Sagan om Sune del 2. Also released were two EMI tapes entitled Sagan om Sune from 1987 and "Sune får goddaggoddagsjukan" from 1988.

The tape Sune får goddaggoddagsjukan consists of the stories "Sune får goddaggoddagsjukan", "Sune blir botad" and "Bollen i burken" on side A and the stories "Gäckande skuggan", "Sune ska lära sig simma" and "Sune i badhuset" on side B.
