= Mamma Moo and the Crow =

- Starring: Rachel Mohlin; Johan Ulveson; Sara Lindh; Erik Ahrnbom; Melker Duberg; Amanda Jennefors
- Release date: September 19, 2008
- Running time: 77 minutes
- Country: Sweden
- Language: Swedish

Mamma Moo and the Crow (Swedish: Mamma Mu & Kråkan) is a 2008 Swedish animated feature film directed by Igor Veichtaguin after an original script by Jujja and Tomas Wieslander featuring the character Mama Moo.

== Cast ==
- Rachel Mohlin – Mamma Mu
- Johan Ulveson – Kråkan
- Sara Lindh - Bondens fru
- Erik Ahrnbom - Bonden
- Melker Duberg - Lillebror
- Amanda Jennefors - Lina
