= Allan Svensson =

Swedish actor (1951–2024)

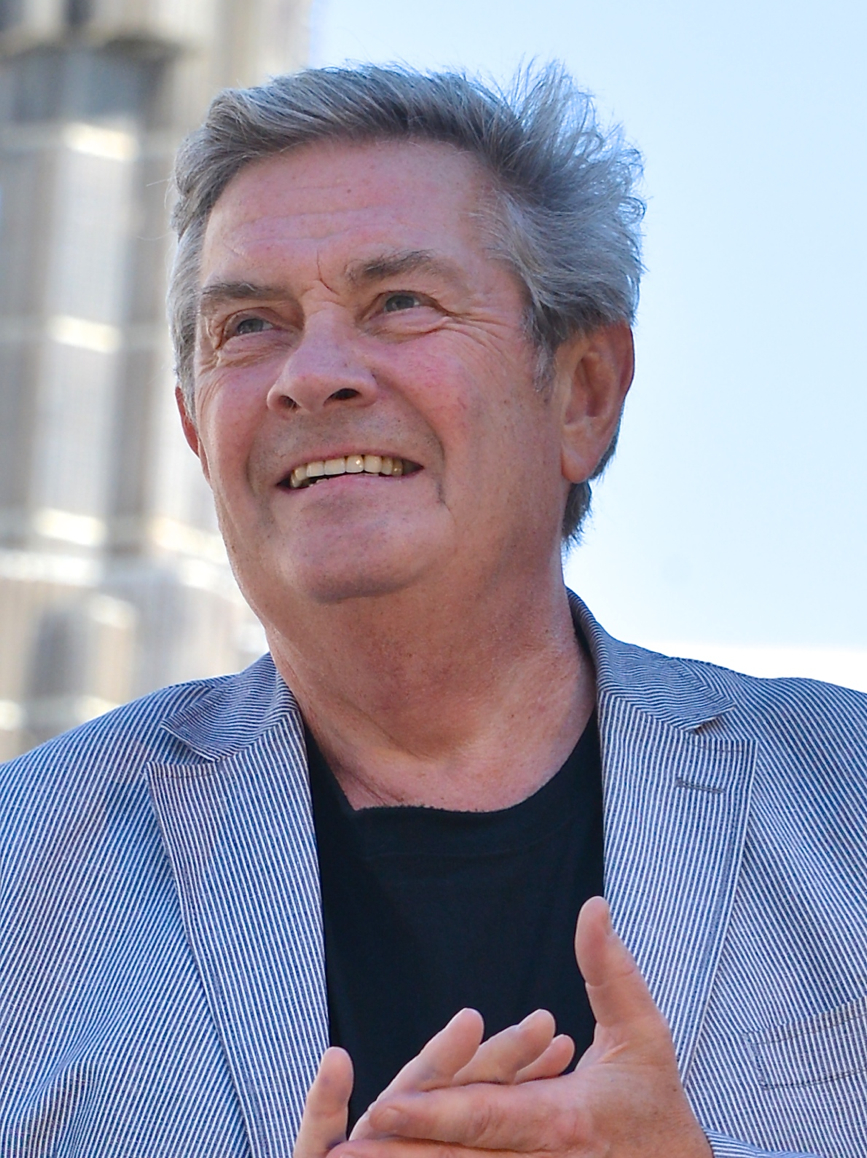
- Svensson in 2013
- Born: Dan Allan Waldemar Svensson; 16 February 1951; Stockholm, Sweden
- Died: 17 November 2024 (aged 73)
- Occupation: Actor
- Years active: 1977–2024

Dan Allan Waldemar Svensson (16 February 1951 – 17 November 2024) was a Swedish actor perhaps mostly known for his role as Gustav Svensson in the hit comedy series Svensson, Svensson. Besides acting in films, television and on stage, Svensson owned and ran the film production company Ridåfall AB.

== Life and career ==
Svensson was born in Stockholm but grew up in Tranemo, Sweden. At the age of seventeen he moved to Värnamo and started high school studies. At the end of the 1970s, Svensson enrolled for acting studies at Skara Skolscen and then at Teaterhögskolan in Gothenburg.

His first television role was as Erik in Hedebyborna. He has worked as part of the Stockholm stadsteater ensemble, acted in films and on television and also directed. The theatre and television roles have varied, from playing Cyrano at Oscarsteatern to playing the everyday stereotypical Swede Gustav Svensson in the SVT comedy show Svensson, Svensson and the role of RF Simpson in the Swedish version of the musical Singing in the Rain at Oscarsteatern.

During the summer of 2007, Svensson performed on stage comedy shows in Växjö in the play Kuta och Kör where he had the lead role. Also in 2007, Svensson played Santa Claus on Julkalendern on SVT. In 2008 he acted in the TV4 miniseries Maria Wern – Främmande fågel alongside Eva Röse.

In November 2013, Svensson revealed that he was to play Kapten Klänning more known as Göran Lindberg a former police chief who was imprisoned in 2010 for sexually abusing a number of women. The play Fallet Kapten Klänning was performed at Uppsala City Theatre. In the summer of 2014 Svensson and Robert Gustafsson worked together in the play Charmörer på vift at the Krusenstiernska outside theater. Linda Olsson also appeared in the play as the love interest of both the men as "Yvette".

Svensson died from prostate cancer on 17 November 2024, at the age of 73.

== Filmography (selection) ==
- 1978: Hedebyborna (TV)
- 1985: August Strindberg ett liv (TV)
- 1986: Hassel – Anmäld försvunnen (TV film)
- 1986: Mästerdetektiven Basil Mus (voice of Skrället)
- 1986: Resan till Amerika (voice of Tiger)
- 1986: Sammansvärjningen (TV)
- 1987: Saxofonhallicken (TV film)
- 1988: Strul
- 1988: Kråsnålen (TV)
- 1989: Tre kärlekar (TV series, guest role)
- 1990: Den svarta cirkeln
- 1990: Bernard och Bianca i Australien (voice of McLeach)
- 1991: Agnes Cecilia – en sällsam historia
- 1991: Resan till Amerika - Fievel i vilda västern (voice of Tiger)
- 1992: Kejsarn av Portugallien
- 1994: Svensson, Svensson (TV-series)
- 1994: Tummelisa (voice of herr Mullvad)
- 1994: Bert (TV-serie)
- 1995: Sommaren
- 1995: Bert: The Last Virgin
- 1996: Vinterviken
- 1996: Svensson, Svensson (TV series)
- 1997: Svensson, Svensson
- 1998: Resan till Amerika - Skatten på Manhattan (voice of Tiger)
- 1999: Asterix och Obelix möter Caesar (Swedish voice of Obelix)
- 1999: Resan till Amerika - Mysteriet med nattmonstret (voice of Tiger)
- 1999: Jakten på en mördare
- 2000: Hassel - Förgörarna
- 2000: Hjärta av sten
- 2000: Kejsarens nya stil (röst som Pacha)
- 2001: Harry Potter och de vises sten (voice of Rubeus Hagrid)
- 2002: Monsters, Inc. (Swedish voice for Sulley)
- 2002: Asterix & Obelix: Uppdrag Kleopatra (voice of Obelix)
- 2002: Ice Age (röst som Soto)
- 2002: Harry Potter och Hemligheternas kammare (voice of Rubeus Hagrid)
- 2003: Håkan Bråkan (Julkalendern at Sveriges television) (Santa Claus, one episode)
- 2004: The Incredibles (voice of Bob Parr/Mr. Incredible)
- 2004: Kogänget (röst som hunden Rusty)
- 2004: Harry Potter och fången från Azkaban (voice Rubeus Hagrid)
- 2005: God morgon alla barn
- 2005: Harry Potter och den flammande bägaren (voice of Rubeus Hagrid)
- 2005: Wallander - Bröderna
- 2005: Kejsarens nya stil 2 - Kronks nya stil (voice of Pacha)
- 2006: Tusenbröder - Återkomsten
- 2006: Göta kanal 2 – Kanalkampen
- 2007: Svensson, Svensson (TV series)
- 2007: Harry Potter och Fenixorden (voice of Rubeus Hagrid)
- 2007: En riktig jul (Julkalendern at Sveriges television)
- 2008: Svensson, Svensson (TV series)
- 2008: Maria Wern - Främmande fågel
- 2008: Oskyldigt dömd
- 2008: Asterix på olympiaden (voice of Obelix)
- 2010: Maria Wern - Stum sitter guden
- 2010: Maria Wern - Alla de stillsamma döda
- 2011: Åsa-Nisse - wälkom to Knohult
- 2011: Stockholm - Båstad (TV series)
- 2011: Maria Wern - Må döden sova
- 2011: Svensson, Svensson - i nöd och lust
- 2011: Tintins äventyr: Enhörningens hemlighet (voice of Allan Thompson)
- 2012: Modig (voice of Lord Dingwall)
- 2012: Gustafsson 3 tr
- 2012: Asterix & Obelix och britterna (voice of Obelix)
- 2012: De fem legenderna
- 2013: That Boy Emil
- 2013: Monsters University (voice of Sulley)
