= Hemliga byrån =

Swedish synthpop group

- Origin: Örebro, Sweden
- Genres: synthpop
- Years active: 1986–
- Labels: EMI, HB Wråk
- Past members: Sören Olsson; Anders Jacobsson "Kalle Kod" "Agent 2,14" "Jutta mä smyg"

Hemliga byrån was a Swedish synthpop group with Swedish writers Anders Jacobsson and Sören Olsson. One of their most famous songs, Hej, hej, hemskt mycket hej, became a 1987 Svensktoppen hit. Another famous song was Hjärtattack. They also acted as house band for the TV series Trollkontroll in 1990, featuring a music video in each episode.

== Discography ==
- 1986 - Hej, Hej, hemskt mycket hej: vinyl single
- 1987 - Hej, Hej, hemskt mycket hej: LP album
- 1987 - Attji: vinyl single
- 1987 - Tidlösa tiden: vinyl single with Ko-Benkes Trio
- 1990 - Hjärtattack: vinyl single
- 1990 - Det ska va körv: vinyl single
