= Emanuel Hjort =

- First appearance: Emanuel (2000)
- Last appearance: Sex (2007)
- Created by: Anders Jacobsson and Sören Olsson

In-universe information
- Species: human
- Gender: boy
- Occupation: schoolboy
- Nationality: Swedish

Emanuel Hjort is a Swedish fictional character, created by Swedish writers Anders Jacobsson and Sören Olsson for a youth book series. Upon the 2000 release, the old Bert Diaries series had been completed with Berts bokslut in 1999.

Emanuel is 16 years old in the first book, and thinks even more of girls than Sune and Bert. Emanuel is also interested in photographing. His mother is named Elisabeth, and his father Roger. His 23 year old sister Emma is living in Denmark.

== Books ==
Title	Year of publishing (Sweden)
Emanuel	2000
Hat och kärlek	2001
Cyberprinsen	2002
Sommarförföraren	2003
Hobbyfrälsaren	2004
Sex	2007
