= Sune's Summer =

Sunes sommar
- Swedish DVD cover
- Directed by: Stephan Apelgren
- Written by: Stephan Apelgren; Anders Jacobsson (novel); Sören Olsson (novel)
- Produced by: Christian Wistrand; Waldemar Bergendahl
- Starring: Peter Haber; Carina Lidbom; Andreas Hoffer; Gabriel Odenhammar; Nina Almlöf
- Edited by: Håkan Karlsson; Hélène Berlin
- Music by: Thomas Lindahl
- Production companies: AB Svensk Filmindustri; Sveriges Television
- Distributed by: AB Svensk Filmindustri
- Release date: 25 December 1993 (Sweden)
- Running time: 89 minutes
- Country: Sweden
- Language: Swedish

Sunes Summer (Swedish: Sunes sommar) is a Swedish comedy film directed by Stephan Apelgren, which was released to cinemas in Sweden on 25 December 1993. It is based on the chapter book with the same name, the eighth in the book series about Sune, written by Anders Jacobsson and Sören Olsson. At the 29th Guldbagge Awards, Peter Haber was nominated for the Best Actor award. The film also won a shared first-prize during the Italiafiction festival in Salerno in July 1994.

== Plot ==
It is summer in Sweden, and the Andersson family has decided to go on vacation to Greece. The trip turns out to be too expensive, especially when Håkan destroys a window in the travel agency after climbing a shelf of newspapers. Rudolf decides that they should go on a caravan holiday instead. When they start the journey, Karin runs over Rudolf's foot with the caravan and they have to go into a hospital. There, Rudolf gets his foot bandaged by Lenny, a medic who is pretending to be a doctor. At the hospital, Sune meets a girl named Cornelia and falls in love with her, but he makes a fool of himself at a candy vending machine by pressing the button for snus by accident.

The next day they arrive at the "Jonsson camp" where they should stay. At the campsite, Anna meets the greaser Leffe and they immediately become fond of each other, Leffe subsequently runs over Håkan with his quad bike. It turns out that the family is living next door to Lenny, and Cornelia, his daughter.

Sune tries out a way to win Cornelia's heart, giving her a pair of earrings that he believes are in a toy machine at the campsite. Therefore, he begins to raise money by returning bottles and cans, but all he gets is a bunch of Phantom rings. Eventually, he gets the earrings from one of the campsite owners.

Before it is time for the family to go home, they are invited to a farewell party by Lenny's family. During the party, Lenny's brother Kenny, who is a real doctor, arrives. He looks at Rudolf's foot, which proves to have healed. The film ends with Sune and Cornelia meeting on the beach at dusk, where she gets the earrings.

== Production ==
The film was shot in Stockholm, at Tofta Beach on Gotland and at Björkviks havsbad on Ingarö. Recordings began on 14 June 1993.

== Cast ==
- Peter Haber as Rudolf Andersson
- Carina Lidbom as Karin Andersson
- Andreas Hoffer as Sune Andersson
- Gabriel Odenhammar as Håkan Andersson
- Nina Almlöf as Anna Andersson
- Pär Ericson as Rune/Torsten
- Nils Moritz as the cyclist
- Robert Gustafsson as Leffe
- Lars Väringer as Lenny
- Anna von Rosen-Sundelius as Bettan
- Tina Johnson as Cornelia
- Carl Magnus Dellow as Kenny
- Gaby Stenberg as Mrs. Gunnarsson
- Anne-Li Norberg as the lady at the travel agency
- Göran Gillinger as the beachguy
- Dorman Smith as a basketball player
- My Linder as Stina

== Home video ==
The film was released to home video 1994 in, originally to VHS and later also to DVD. It also appeared in the 2008 compilation box "Sommar & jul med Sune" consisting of a triple DVD also consisting of Sunes jul.
