= Kurt Olssons julkalender =

SVT's 1990 Christmas Calendar

- Genre: children
- Created by: Lasse Brandeby; Håkan Wennberg
- Based on: Kurt Olsson
- Starring: Lasse Brandeby; Hans Wiktorsson; Ulla Skoog; Anki Rahlskog; Jörgen Mörnbäck
- Country of origin: Sweden
- Original language: Swedish
- No. of seasons: 1
- No. of episodes: 24

Original release
- Network: SVT1
- Release: 1 December – 24 December 1990

Related
- T. Sventon praktiserande privatdetektiv (1989); Sunes jul (1991)

Kurt Olssons julkalender ("Kurt Olsson's Christmas Calendar") is the Sveriges Television's Christmas calendar in 1990.

== Plot ==
Kurt Olsson and Arne Nyström are doing Christmas decorations inside a barn in Swedish Lapland.
