= Sten Elfström =

Swedish actor (1942–2024)

- Born: 18 August 1942
- Died: 20 March 2024 (aged 81)

Sten Gustav Axelsson Elfström (18 August 1942 – 21 March 2024) was a Swedish actor. Elfström was born in Solna, Sweden on 18 August 1942, and educated at Gothenburg Theatre Academy. He died on 21 March 2024, at the age of 81.

== Selected filmography ==
- 2015 – Avicii - Waiting For Love (music video)
- 2012 – Real Humans (TV)
- 2010 – Sound of Noise
- 2010 – Tusen gånger starkare
- 2010 – Psalm 21
- 2009 – Morden
- 2009 – Kenny Begins
- 2008 – Kungamordet (TV)
- 2008 – The King of Ping Pong
- 2007 – Den man älskar
- 2007 – Hotell Kantarell (TV)
- 2006 – Brandvägg (TV)
- 2006 – Kronprinsessan (TV)
- 2003 – En utflykt till månens baksida
- 2003 – Håkan Bråkan (TV)
- 2002 – Beck – Annonsmannen
- 2000 – Soldater i månsken (TV)
- 1998 – Skärgårdsdoktorn (TV)
- 1997 – Kenny Starfighter (TV)
- 1995 – Snoken (TV)
- 1990 – Ebba & Didrik (TV)
- 1983 – Profitörerna (TV)
- 1980 – Lycka till (TV)
