= Svensson, Svensson =

- Genre: Sitcom; Comedy
- Created by: Michael Hjorth; Johan Kindblom; Tomas Tivemark
- Starring: Allan Svensson; Suzanne Reuter; Gabriel Odenhammar
- Composer: Ragnar Grippe
- Country of origin: Sweden
- Original language: Swedish
- No. of seasons: 4
- No. of episodes: 50

Production
- Running time: 25–30 minutes
- Production company: SVT Drama

Original release
- Network: SVT1 (1994) (season 1); SVT2 (1996) (season 2); SVT1 (2007–2008) (seasons 3–4)
- Release: 7 October 1994 – 20 December 2008

Svensson, Svensson is a Swedish sitcom. It has also been made into a feature film and a play.

Two seasons consisting of 12 episodes each were broadcast in the autumn of 1994 and the autumn of 1996. They have since been repeated numerous times. The series was revived for a third season in 2007, and a fourth in 2008.

Svensson, Svensson is one of the most successful sitcoms in Swedish television history. During the second season, each episode attracted more than 2.5 million viewers, in a country which at the time had a population of around 8.8 million people. The most watched episode was broadcast on 17 November 1996 and attracted 3,395,000 viewers.

The series centres on the Svensson family who lives in the Vivalla area of Örebro. The family consists of the father Gustav (Allan Svensson) who works as mailman, the mother Lena (Suzanne Reuter) who works at a bank, their teenage daughter Lina (Chelsie Bell Dickson) and their son Max (Gabriel Odenhammar). For the revival with the third season, Gustav has had to retire from his work at the post office, while Lena works for the local government. Max now works at the bank and Lina (now played by Claudia Galli) has married the orchestral conductor John (Felix Engström) who brought his daughter Greta (Embla Hjulström) into the family.

Svensson is one of the most common surnames in Sweden. It is often used to represent something average, which is illustrated by the word Medelsvensson, the "average Swede". Svensson corresponds to Smith in Anglo-Saxon countries.

== Characters ==
Gustav Svensson (played by Allan Svensson)

Gustav's main interests are ball games and cartoons, especially The Smurfs and Scooby-Doo. He is a very conservative Social Democrat and he looks upon every change in his life with much suspicion. His biggest idol is Björn Borg, who signed the pair of underpants which hangs on the wall in Gustav and Lena's bedroom. His most precious possession is a Volvo 242, his only benefit after 20 years as a mailman. In 1987, he was elected The Mailman of the Year... or at least he joined the dinner party.

Gustav is very confused by the choices of occupation that his children Lina and Max make, but he soon learns that it's great to have a son working at the bank. Gustav's favourite foods are lasagna and pizza, especially Hawaii, Capricciosa and Calzone.

Lena Svensson (played by Suzanne Reuter)

The wife of Gustav and the mother of Max and Lina. Lena is a calm woman who is more open for changes than Gustav.

Max Svensson (played by Gabriel Odenhammar)

The son of Gustav and Lena and the brother of Lina. In the first two seasons of the show, Max was a very cynical and sarcastic boy, which changed as the series progressed into a third and fourth season, due to becoming a grown-up. Despite Gustav hoping that he'd grow up to become a mailman, Max studied economics in college for a few years and got a job at the bank - a late teenage revolt according to Gustav.

Lina Svensson (played by Chelsie Bell Dickson and Claudia Galli)

The daughter of Gustav and Lena and the sister of Max. In the first two seasons, she was a typical teenager, who loved horses but later grew interested in boys, something that Gustav can't understand hence tries to prevent her from seeing boys. In the latter two seasons, she works as a veterinary surgeon and shares her home with her fiancé John and his daughter Greta. They have bought the house Lena and Gustav used to live in, causing Gustav to buy the house across the street. At the end of season 3, Lena gets pregnant, something that Gustav does not get happy for. In the very last episode, she gives birth to a boy named Sixten.

Lina is played by Chelsie Bell Dickson in the first two seasons and the movie, and in the last two seasons, she is played by Claudia Galli.

John Franzén (played by Felix Engström)

The fiancé of Lina and the father of Greta. He tries to befriend Gustav, although he has a hard time getting used to John. Gustav is constantly bothered by the thought of Lina marrying John, who has "the most dumbest occupation in the world" - conducting.

Greta Franzén (played by Embla Hjulström)

The daughter of John. She gets along well with Gustav, because they share thoughts and they are both very fond of watching cartoons.

Ebba (played by Ami Camilla Wester)

The girlfriend of Max. She does not get much on-screen time. She only appeared in two episodes of season three, and six episodes of season four. Gustav gets along better with Ebba than with John.

Sara (played by Charlott Strandberg) (Season 1, and two episodes of Season 2) The closest female friend of Lena, and is by occupation a hair-dresser. Somewhat air-headed, and very interested in attractive single men. Gustav, on the other hand, treats her in a somewhat snide and condescending manner. He nevertheless makes it clear, when she moves out, that he actually is going to miss her.
