= Sune börjar tvåan =

1985 children's book by Anders Jacobsson and Sören Olsson

- First edition
- Author: Anders Jacobsson and Sören Olsson
- Illustrator: Sören Olsson
- Language: Swedish
- Series: Sune
- Genre: Children's, youth
- Set in: fictional town of Glimmerdagg, Sweden
- Published: 1985
- Publisher: Hegas
- Publication place: Sweden
- ISBN: 91-86650-13-0
- Preceded by: Sagan om Sune (1984)
- Followed by: Självklart, Sune (1986)

Sune börjar tvåan (Swedish: Sune starts the second grade) is a chapter book, written by Anders Jacobsson and Sören Olsson and originally published in 1985. It tells the story of Sune Andersson during the 2nd grade at school in Sweden.

The book has also been used within higher education about how gender roles are depicted in various literature at school.

== Plot ==
Sune is eight years old and is about to begin the second grade at school in Sweden. There is also a new girl, Maria Perez, and Sune falls in love with her. The problem is that he still likes Sophie.

Sune is also visited by his cousin Algot. He also meets a guy, Affe, who tries to force Sune to join a gang of girl haters, which Sune doesn't want.

Sune also fears getting affected by his father becoming a "dirty old man", and the Andersson family will soon be expanded. At school, the children play theater, when Sune gets the girl role Little Red Riding Hood. He also ends up at the hospital, for a cecum removal surgery.

Sune also tries to run away from home.

== Audiobook ==
Audio recordings were released to cassette tape in 1986 by SR Örebro entitled "Sune börjar tvåan". and by the EMI label in 1988 on two tapes entitled "Sune och Maria Perez". samt "Sune och tjejhatarligan".

The tape "Sune och Maria Perez" consists of the stories "Sune börjar tvåan", "Sune och Maria Perez", "Gubbsjukan" and "Kusin Algot" on side A and the stories "Sune klär ut sig", "Sune och rödluvan", "Pjäsdagen" och "Mammas hemlis" on side B.

The tape "Sune och tjejhatarligan" consists of the stories "Sune får blindtarmen", "Affe Asgam", "Tjejhatarligan", "Annas killar" and "Sune och Karl-Jörgen" on side A and the stories "Sune har vikarie", "Sune rymmer", "Fy Fabian" and "Hemåt igen" on side B.
