= Lidbom =

Lidbom is a surname. Notable people with the surname include:

- Carina Lidbom, Swedish actress and comedienne
- Carl Lidbom, Politician and Member of the parliament of Sweden
