= Wieslander =

Wieslander is a Swedish surname. Notable people with the surname include:

- Agnes Wieslander (1873–1934), Swedish painter
- Hugo Wieslander (1889–1976), Swedish Olympic athlete
- Jujja Wieslander (née Bergkvist; born 1944), Swedish author
- Ulla-Britt Wieslander (1942–2023), Swedish Olympic sprinter
