= Håkan Bråkan (TV series) =

- Genre: children
- Created by: Anders Jacobsson and Sören Olsson
- Directed by: Hannes Holm
- Country of origin: Sweden
- Original language: Swedish
- No. of seasons: 1
- No. of episodes: 24

Production
- Production company: SVT

Original release
- Network: SVT1
- Release: 1 December – 24 December 2003

Related
- Dieselråttor & sjömansmöss (2002); Allrams höjdarpaket (2004)

Håkan Bråkan is the Sveriges Television's Christmas calendar of 2003, based on the literary character with the same name.

The paper-calendar depicts the Andersson family's house, and characters from the series. The background also shows the mental institution where Karin lives during parts of the series.

== Story ==
The plot is based on Familjen Anderssons sjuka jul and the Christmas show featured Håkan as the protagonist. Contrary to the belief of Sune, Håkan is actually a very nice and thoughtful 7-year-old boy. He is quite ingenious and does lots of pranks that usually puts him or others in a tight spot but this is seldom his intended purpose. When Håkan's mother Karin is doing all of the Christmas chores, she becomes so stressed she eventually winds up in a mental hospital, and this is the main story of the TV show since Christmas is ending and there is still no Christmas presents or candy. Chaos ensues.

Håkan's rather stupid father Rudolf is by his side in this and throughout the show he tries his best to make Christmas perfect, but fails miserably. He and Håkan try to bring the mother home from a crazed doctor at the mental institution who is obsessed with keeping the mother there and not having to celebrate Christmas alone.

The series got quite bad reviews, mainly because the scenario was deemed to be unrealistic. It was also considered a bit depressing for a TV show aimed at kids. Many said it was also too vulgar with too many innuendo jokes and toilet humor, a few examples of this are when Håkan vomits cascades, when harasses his teacher Veronica and felt her breasts and when Håkan dreamed about drinking beer. The calendar was considered the worst Christmas calendar in years at the same year SVT along with DR and NRK focused on the first Junior Eurovision Song Contest which was produced by DR and the EBU and premiered at the same year

Mobile telephones aren't used, but the TV sets use remote controls. The classroom reminds of schools from old days.

== Recording ==
In early February 1999 it was announced that Håkan Bråkan would get his own TV series. which later turned out to become the 2003 SVT Christmas calendar. Recordings began on 27 January 2003.

== Cast ==
- Axel Skogberg - Håkan Bråkan
- Leo Holm - Sune
- Per Svensson - Daddy Rudolf
- Tintin Anderzon - Mommy Karin
- Emma Engström - Anna
- Johan Rheborg - Ragnar
- Sten Elfström - Dr. Malte Severin
- Sissela Kyle - Miss Malin
- Henrik Hjelt - Larsa
- Pernilla August - Leader of Space
- Maria Bonnevie - Veronica
- Lakke Magnusson - Kurt

== Home video ==
The series was also released to DVD och VHS in 2004, and in 2011 it also became available in the "Håkan Bråkan-boxen" box set, consisting of both the TV series "Håkan Bråkan" and the film Håkan Bråkan & Josef.
