= The World of Tosh =

- Also known as: Sune och hans värld
- Created by: Anders Jacobsson and Sören Olsson
- Based on: Sune book series
- Theme music composer: Thomas Lindahl
- Composer: Mikael Sundin
- Countries of origin: Sweden; Germany; Ireland
- Original language: Swedish
- No. of seasons: 1
- No. of episodes: 26

Production
- Producer: John Wigfield
- Editors: Peter Gustafsson; Ralph Christians
- Running time: 22 minutes
- Production companies: Happy Life; EM.TV & Merchandising; Magma Films

Original release
- Network: SVT1; SVT2
- Release: 26 January 2002 – 8 March 2003

The World of Tosh (Swedish: Sune och hans värld) is an animated series based on the Sune books by Anders Jacobsson and Sören Olsson, and produced by the animation studios Happy Life together with German EM.TV & Merchandising and Irish Magma Films, following Peter Gustafsson purchasing the rights for an animated version of Sune in 1995.

The series originally aired at Allra mest tecknat in SVT between 26 January 2002 – 8 March 2003. It received huge popularity in Latin America. An English dub was produced and aired on Nickelodeon and Fox Kids in the UK.

== Episodes ==
1. Inte onormalt normal (Not Abnormally Normal)
2. Den siste pojkscouten (The Lost Boy Scout)
3. Ingenting blir som man tänkt sig
4. Din röst i etern
5. Att angöra en pool (Pool Party)
6. Jag vill också vara en rockstjärna (The Backside Boys)
7. Kalla mig Sunée
8. Ett kvalfyllt val (Wonderful Mid-life)
9. Imse vimse spindel (Along Came a Spider)
10. Den mystiska pussen (Mystery Lips)
11. Buss på vilovägar (The Bus Stops Here)
12. Elementärt, min käre Sune (Elementary, My Dear Tosh)
13. Min sköna kleptoman
14. Mitt liv som Sunes hund. (Puppy Love)
15. Dum, dummare, dummast
16. Livet är en picknick (Take Your Picnic)
17. Flaskposten (Message in a Bottle)
18. Söta Fröken Fräken (Accept No Substitute)
19. Sämst på att vara värst (Not Good at Being Bad)
20. Hellre ensam hemma (Home Not Alone)
21. Sune i klistret (You've Got Male)
22. Vita lögner (The Boy Who Coughed Wolf)
23. Kärlek och gamla sopor
24. Trassel på nätet
25. I nöd och lust
26. Nya grannar (Good Neighbour Riddance)

== Video ==
In 2003-2004, the series was released to video, both DVD and VHS.
