= Embla Hjulström =

Swedish actress

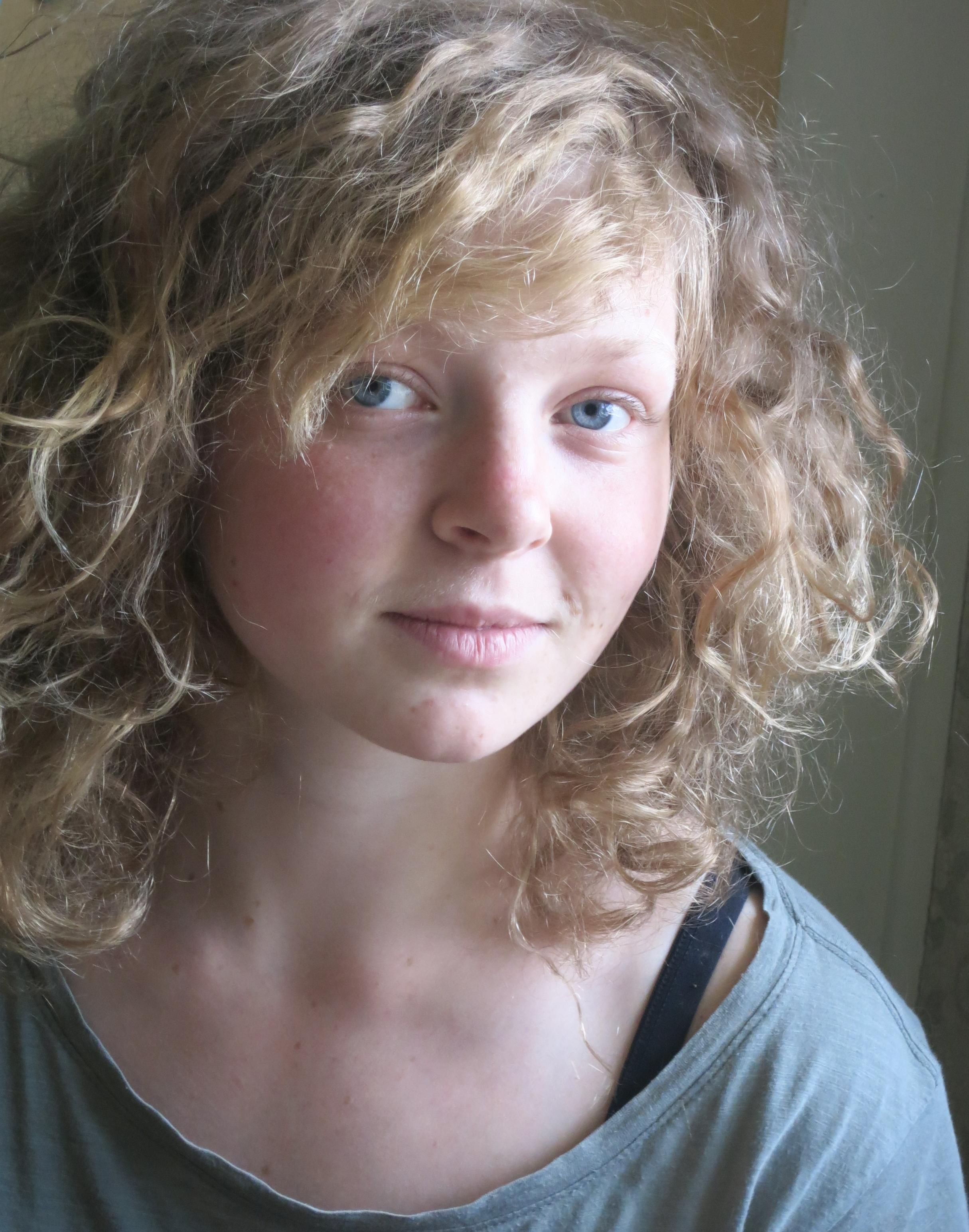
- Born: Embla Ester Lovisa Granqvist Hjulström; 5 July 1994 (age 31); Solna, Sweden
- Occupations: Actress, illustrator
- Parent(s): Lars Hjulström; Eva Märta Granqvist

Embla Ester Lovisa Granqvist Hjulström (born 5 July 1994) is a Swedish actress. She is best known for her role as Greta in Svensson, Svensson and Simone Bernér in several Beck-films.

== Filmography ==
- 2007–2008 – Svensson, Svensson
- Beck – I Guds namn (2007)
- Beck – Gamen (2007)
- Beck – Advokaten (2006)
- Kidz in da Hood (2006)
- Beck – Skarpt läge (2006)
- Lite som du (2005)
- Min sista vilja (2005)
- Four Shades of Brown (2004)
- Syskonsalt (2000)
