= Håkan Bråkan =

Håkan Andersson
- Sune, Håkan Bråkan character
- First appearance: Sagan om Sune (1984, radio series in 1983)
- Created by: Anders Jacobsson and Sören Olsson
- Portrayed by: Gabriel Odenhammar (1991-1993); Axel Skogberg (2003-2004); Julius Jimenez Hugoson (2012-2014); Baxter Renman (2018-present)

In-universe information
- Nickname: Håkan Bråkan
- Nationality: Swedish

Håkan Andersson, nicknamed Håkan Bråkan, is the younger brother of Sune Andersson, the main character in the Swedish Sune series, a series of books. Sune finds Håkan very annoying, having given him the nickname "Håkan Bråkan" which roughly translates to Håkan the Troublemaker.

Since 1998, these are also spin-off-books with Håkan as the main character. In December 2003, Håkan became the main character in Sveriges Television's Christmas calendar, a TV-series with the same name.

== Spinoff books ==
Title	Publication year
Håkan Bråkan och potatismysteriet	1 September 1998
Håkan Bråkan och Roboten Rex	1 September 1999
Håkan Bråkan och den spökiga källaren	1 December 2000
Håkan Bråkan och det stora bråket	1 January 2001
Håkan Bråkan och den bråkiga dagen	1 September 2001
Håkan Bråkan i skogen	1 September 2002
Håkan Bråkan och vinterdagen	1 September 2003
Håkan Bråkans busbok	1 January 2004
Håkan Bråkan och bebismysteriet	1 July 2004
Håkan Bråkan och tjockskallarna	1 July 2005
Håkan Bråkans skräckbok	1 February 2006
Håkan Bråkan och pappa börjar ettan	1 July 2006
Håkan Bråkans skrattbok	1 March 2007
Håkan Bråkan och morfar i himlen	1 July 2007
Håkan Bråkans julafton	31 August 2009
Håkan Bråkans tokbok	8 September 2009
Håkan Bråkan och fiskarnas befrielse	11 September 2009
Håkan Bråkan och sagodagen	13 September 2010
Håkan Bråkan och den dumma	19 August 2011
Håkan Bråkan och den stora fasan	2012
Håkan Bråkans vildbok	2012
Håkan Bråkan och bolltrollaren	2013
Håkan Bråkans fuskbok	2013
Håkan Bråkan och läskiga huset	2014
Håkan Bråkans godbok	2014
