= Per Svensson (actor) =

Swedish actor (born 1965)

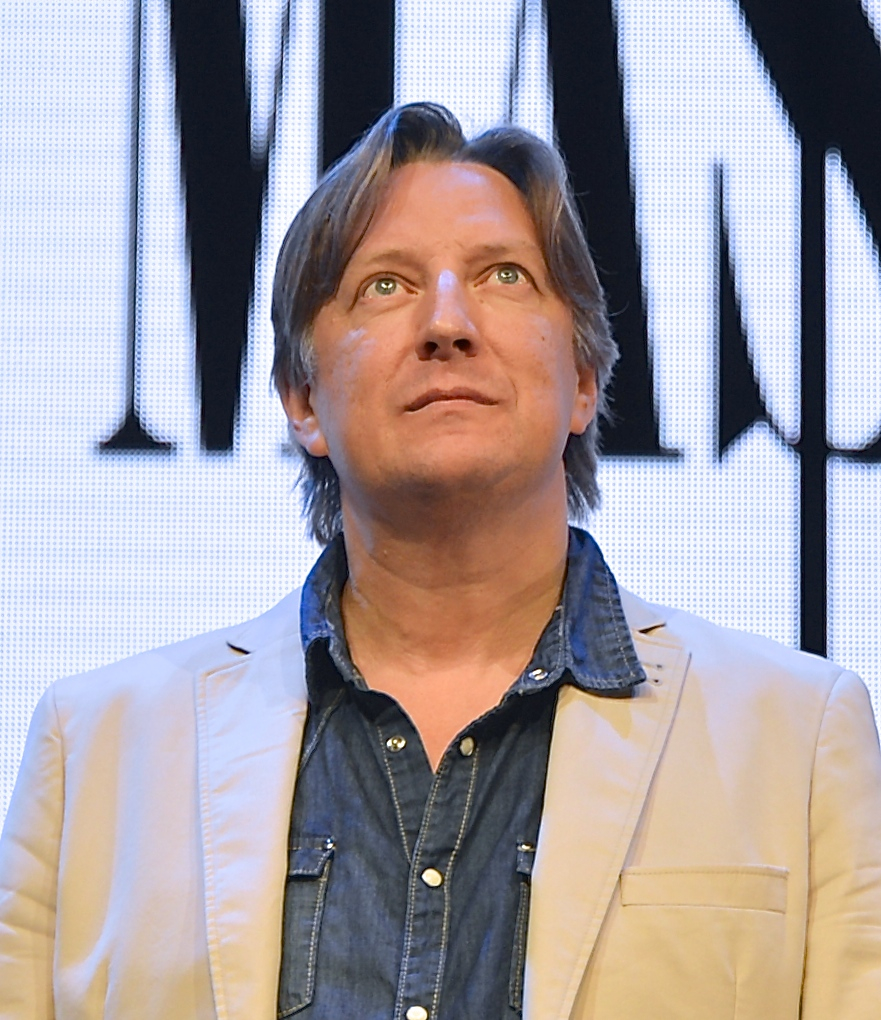
- Svensson in 2014
- Born: 19 June 1965 (age 61); Karlshamn, Sweden
- Occupation: Actor

Per Svensson (born 19 June 1965) is a Swedish actor. Born in Karlshamn, Sweden, Svensson studied at NAMA in Stockholm 1991–94. He belongs to the Royal Dramatic Theatre's permanent ensemble.

== Filmography ==
- The Circle (2015)
- Welcome to Sweden (2014)
- Kenny Begins (2009)
- Ett gott parti (2007)
- Nisse Hults historiska snedsteg (2006)
- Olivia Twist (2005)
- Håkan Bråkan & Josef (2004)
- Håkan Bråkan (2003)
- Beck – Pojken i glaskulan (2002)
- Suxxess (2002)
- Alla älskar Alice (2002)
- Deadline (2001)
- Två som oss (1999)
- Kvinnan i det låsta rummet (1998)
- Juloratoriet (1996)
- Anna Holt (1996)
