= Lakke Magnusson =

Swedish actor

Anders Lars-Göran "Lakke" Magnusson (21 May 1946 in Kinna, Västergötland – 19 February 2004 in Stockholm) was a Swedish actor, best known as Kurt in Håkan Bråkan.

== Selected filmography ==
- 2004 - Kyrkogårdsön
- 2003 - Håkan Bråkan (TV)
- 2003 - Illusive Tracks
- 2000 - Skärgårdsdoktorn (TV)
- 2000 - Ronny & Julia (TV)
- 1999 - Sally (TV)
- 1997 - Kenny Starfighter (TV)
- 1997 - Peter-No-Tail (TV, julkalendern)
- 1997 - Jag är din krigare
- 1996 - Kalle Blomkvist – Mästerdetektiven lever farligt
- 1995 - Anmäld försvunnen (TV)
- 1995 - Vita lögner (TV)
- 1994 - Sommarmord
- 1994 - Den vite riddaren (TV)
