= Nils-Olof Franzén =

Swedish writer

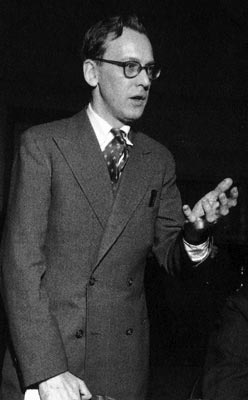
Nils-Olof Franzén

Nils-Olof Franzén (1916–1997) was a Swedish writer who wrote the Agaton Sax series. He was born 23 August 1916, in Oxelösund. He died on 24 February 1997, at age 81. Franzén was married and had three children. His literary estate is represented by ALIS.

He was director of programmes for Swedish Radio from 1956 to 1973, and also wrote a number of biographies.

The first of his Agaton Sax books, Agaton Sax klipper till, was published in 1955. According to a description inside Agaton Sax and the Criminal Doubles, Franzén originally wrote the stories for his son.

== The books ==
Swedish title	Published	English title	Published
Agaton Sax klipper till	1955	Agaton Sax and the Big Rig (extended)	1976
Agaton Sax och den ljudlösa sprängämnesligan	1956	Agaton Sax and the League of Silent Exploders	1974
Agaton Sax och vita möss-mysteriet	1957	Agaton Sax and the Haunted House	1975
Agaton Sax och de slipade diamanttjuvarna	1959	Agaton Sax and the Diamond Thieves	1965
Agaton Sax och det gamla pipskägget	1961	Agaton Sax and the Scotland Yard Mystery	1969
Agaton Sax och Byköpings gästabud	1963	Agaton Sax and the Criminal Doubles	1971
Agaton Sax och bröderna Max	1965	Agaton Sax and the Max Brothers (a.k.a. Bank Robbers)	1970
Agaton Sax och den bortkomne mr Lispington	1966	Agaton Sax and the Colossus of Rhodes	1972
Agaton Sax och de okontanta miljardärerna	1967	Not published in the UK	
Agaton Sax och den svällande rotmos-affären	1970	Agaton Sax and the London Computer Plot	1973
Agaton Sax och den mörklagda ljusmaskinen	1978	Agaton Sax and Lispington's Grandfather Clock	1978
