= Annette Stensson-Fjordefalk =

Swedish actress

- Born: 23 December 1958; Borås, Sweden
- Occupation: actress
- Years active: 1985-

Annette Stensson-Fjordefalk (born Stensson 23 December 1958 in Borås) is a Swedish actress.

== Selected filmography ==
- 1991 - Sunes jul (TV)
- 1997 - Slutspel
- 2006 - LasseMajas detektivbyrå
- 2009 - A Midsummer Night’s Party
