= Sunes jul =

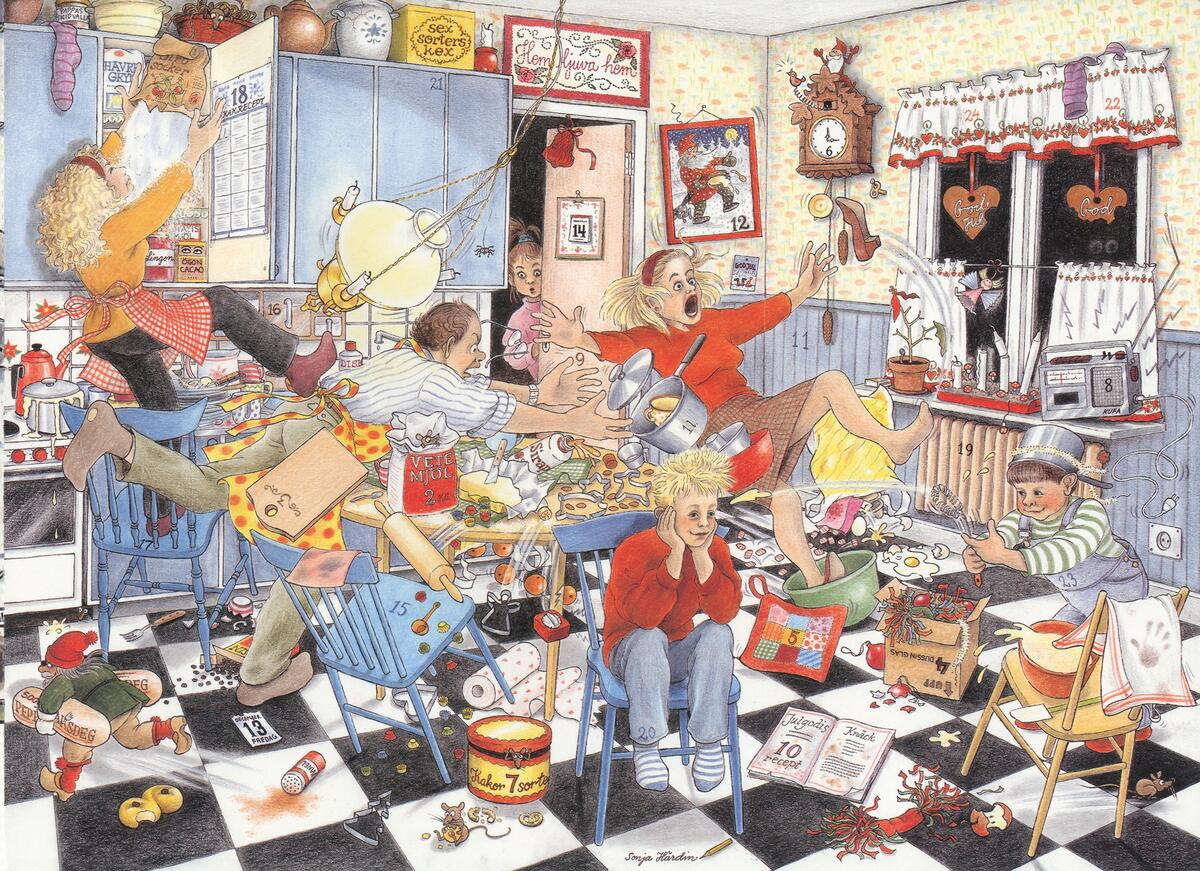
- Paper calendar
- Genre: Comedy, Family
- Written by: Anders Jacobsson; Sören Olsson
- Directed by: Stephan Apelgren
- Narrated by: Anders Jacobsson; Sören Olsson
- Theme music composer: Thomas Lindahl
- Country of origin: Sweden
- Original language: Swedish
- No. of episodes: 24

Production
- Producer: Caisa Westling
- Running time: 15 minutes

Original release
- Network: SVT1
- Release: 1 December – 24 December 1991

Related
- Kurt Olssons julkalender (1990); Klasses julkalender (1992)

Sunes jul (Swedish for Sune's Christmas) was the 1991 SVT Christmas calendar. In 2004, it was released to DVD. In 2007, it was voted the third best Julkalender ever in Aftonbladet. It is based on the books series about the boy Sune by Anders Jacobsson and Sören Olsson.

The series was viewed by over 3 million viewers, which at the time was an all-time record for SVT's Christmas calendar.

== Castlist ==
- Andreas Hoffer as Karl Sune Rudolf Andersson
- Anders Jacobsson as Speaker
- Sören Olsson as Speaker
- Peter Haber as Rudolf Andersson
- Carina Lidbom as Karin Andersson
- Gabriel Odenhammar as Håkan Andersson
- Nina Almlöf as Anna Andersson
- Rebecka Liljeberg as Sophie Blixt
- Calle Torén as Sune's Friend
- Anette Stenson-Fjordefalk as the lady teacher
- Jimmy Karlsson as Jocke
- Pär Ericson as the Principal
- Måns Herngren as Staffan Stolledräng
- Åke Lindström as Santa Claus

== Episodes ==
1. Julkortet (The Christmas Photography)
2. Sophie! (Sophie!)
3. Tjejgrej (Girly Thing)
4. Hockeyklubban (The Hockey Stick)
5. Skidvallan (The Ski Wax)
6. Skrik- och gapsjukan (Shout- and Gape Disease)
7. Partyt (The Party)
8. Julbordet (The Christmas Dinner)
9. Rollen (The Role)
10. Julspelet (The Nativity Play)
11. Varuhuset (The Department Store)
12. Krig! (War!)
13. Lucia (Saint Lucy)
14. Julbaket (The Christmas Baking)
15. Pulkapappa (Pulk Father)
16. Julstädning (Christmas Cleaning)
17. Farmor och farfar (Grandmother and Grandfather)
18. Julgranen (The Christmas Tree)
19. Julpynt (Christmas Decorations)
20. Skolavslutningen (The Graduation)
21. Julrim (Christmas Rhyme)
22. I kyrkan (In Church)
23. Dan-före-dan (The Day Before the Day)
24. Julafton (Christmas Eve)

== Recording ==
Recordings began in March 1991.

== Home video ==
In 1992 the series was released to VHS with the title "Sunes vecka", with rereleases in 1993 and 1999, and in 2002 it was released to DVD in two parts, with volume 1 in a red box and volume 2 in a green box. The film Sune's Summer was released to DVD on 20 October 2004, and in 2008 a DVD with both Sunes jul and Sune's Summer was released", with both volumes on the same edition.

Episode 20; Skolavslutning, is not on any DVD edition.

=== Home video releases ===
Number	Title	Episode 1	Episode 2	Episode 3	Episode 4	Episode 5	Release year
1	"Sunes vecka 1 : potatisgratäng"	Julkortet	Sophie	Skidvallan	Tjejgrej	Hockeyklubban	1992
2	"Sunes vecka 2 : morotsgratäng"	-	-	-	-	-	1992
3	"Sunes vecka 3 : broccoligratäng"	?	?	?	?	?	1992
4	"Sunes vecka 4 : ingen gratäng"	I kyrkan	Dan före dan	Julafton	-	-	1992
