= Kenny Starfighter =

- Genre: Comedy; Science fiction
- Created by: Mats Lindberg; Carl Åstrand
- Starring: Johan Rheborg; Johan Stattin; Josefin Edvardsson; Gabriel Hermelin; Linus Samuelsson
- Country of origin: Sweden
- Original language: Swedish
- No. of seasons: 1
- No. of episodes: 6

Production
- Producers: Mikael Kinning; Jan Zachrisson
- Running time: 30 minutes

Original release
- Network: SVT
- Release: 4 October – 8 November 1997
- Release: 21 September 2022 – present

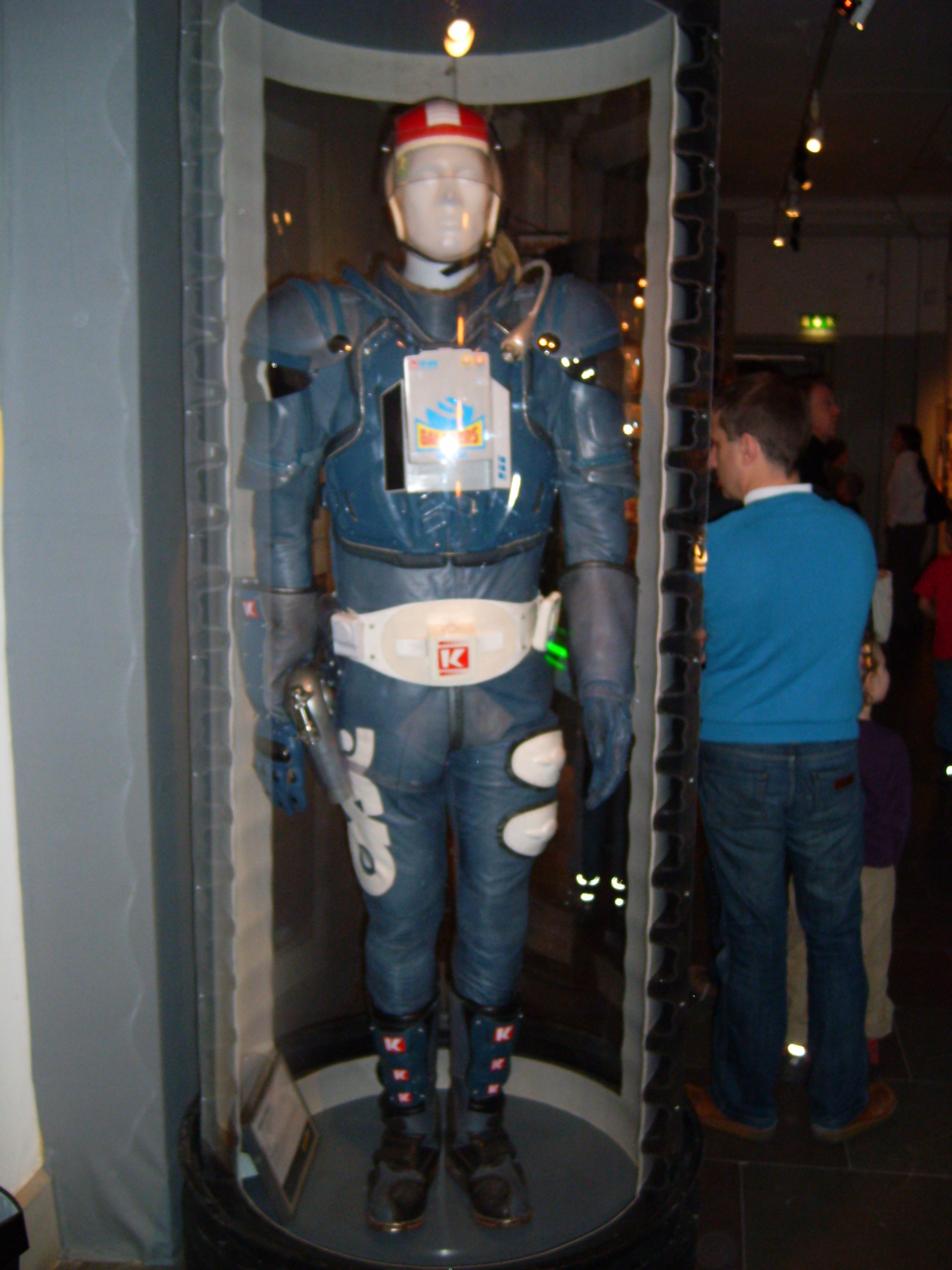
The suit of Kenny Starfighter at Stockholm City Museum.

Kenny Starfighter is a Swedish science fiction television series that follows the titular hero as he fights against the evil lord Dr. Deo. Although aimed at children, this show was popular with adults as well. A film, Kenny Begins, was made in 2009. In June 2022, it was announced that a new season of the series will premiere in the fall, and will take place 20 years after the first season. It began airing on September 21, 2022, and so far has only aired one episode. It is unknown if there will be any more in the second season.

== Premise ==
Kenny Starfighter, a Galactic Hero of dubious ability, is sent to Earth to find and stop the evil Doctor Deo as the Galaxy's last hope after all other Galactic Heroes have gone MIA. Whilst in pursuit of the doctor his space-bus crashes in a small Swedish town. Here he learns that the teachers at a local school have been acting bizarrely and joins forces with some of the school children to investigate this. They find the person behind the strange behavior at the school is none other than Dr. Deo. Through their combined efforts they manage to defeat him and save Kenny's home planet Mylta.

== Cast ==
- Johan Rheborg as Kenny Starfighter
- Johan Stattin as Markus
- Josefin Edvardsson as Sofia
- Gabriel Hermelin as Tyrone
- Linus Samuelsson as Burken
- Måns Westfelt as Colonel Heinz
- Sten Ljunggren as Headmaster
- Lakke Magnusson as Biology teacher
- Thomas Di Leva as Music teacher
- Benny Haag as German teacher
- Sten Elfström as Policeman
- Gunilla Paulsen as Mona
- Camilla Henemark as School nurse
- Emma Hanfot as Jacqueline
- Lars Hansson as Gas station owner

== Episodes ==
=== Season 1 (1997) ===
No. overall	No. in season	Title	Directed by	Written by	Original release date
1	1	"Vårt sista hopp"	Carl Åstrand, Mats Lindberg & Pontus Löwenhielm	Carl Åstrand, Jonas Inde, Mats Lindberg; Pontus Löwenhielm & Måns Mårlind	October 4, 1997
2	2	"Den försvunna Chokladzingofabriken"	Carl Åstrand, Mats Lindberg & Pontus Löwenhielm	Carl Åstrand, Jonas Inde, Mats Lindberg; Pontus Löwenhielm & Måns Mårlind	October 11, 1997
3	3	"Vem är Dr Deo?"	Carl Åstrand, Mats Lindberg & Pontus Löwenhielm	Carl Åstrand, Jonas Inde, Mats Lindberg; Pontus Löwenhielm & Måns Mårlind	October 18, 1997
4	4	"Gate of hell"	Calle Åstrand, Mats Lindberg & Pontus Löwenhielm	Carl Åstrand, Jonas Inde, Mats Lindberg; Pontus Löwenhielm & Måns Mårlind	October 25, 1997
5	5	"Dr Deo slår tillbaka!"	Carl Åstrand, Mats Lindberg & Pontus Löwenhielm	Carl Åstrand, Jonas Inde, Mats Lindberg; Pontus Löwenhielm & Måns Mårlind	November 1, 1997
6	6	"Kennys återkomst"	Carl Åstrand, Mats Lindberg & Pontus Löwenhielm	Carl Åstrand, Jonas Inde, Mats Lindberg; Pontus Löwenhielm & Måns Mårlind	November 8, 1997

=== Season 2 (2022) ===
No. overall	No. in season	Title	Directed by	Written by	Original release date
7	1	TBA	Carl Åstrand, Mats Lindberg & Pontus Löwenhielm	Carl Åstrand, Mats Lindberg & Pontus Löwenhielm	September 16, 2022
