= Jujja Wieslander =

Swedish children's author

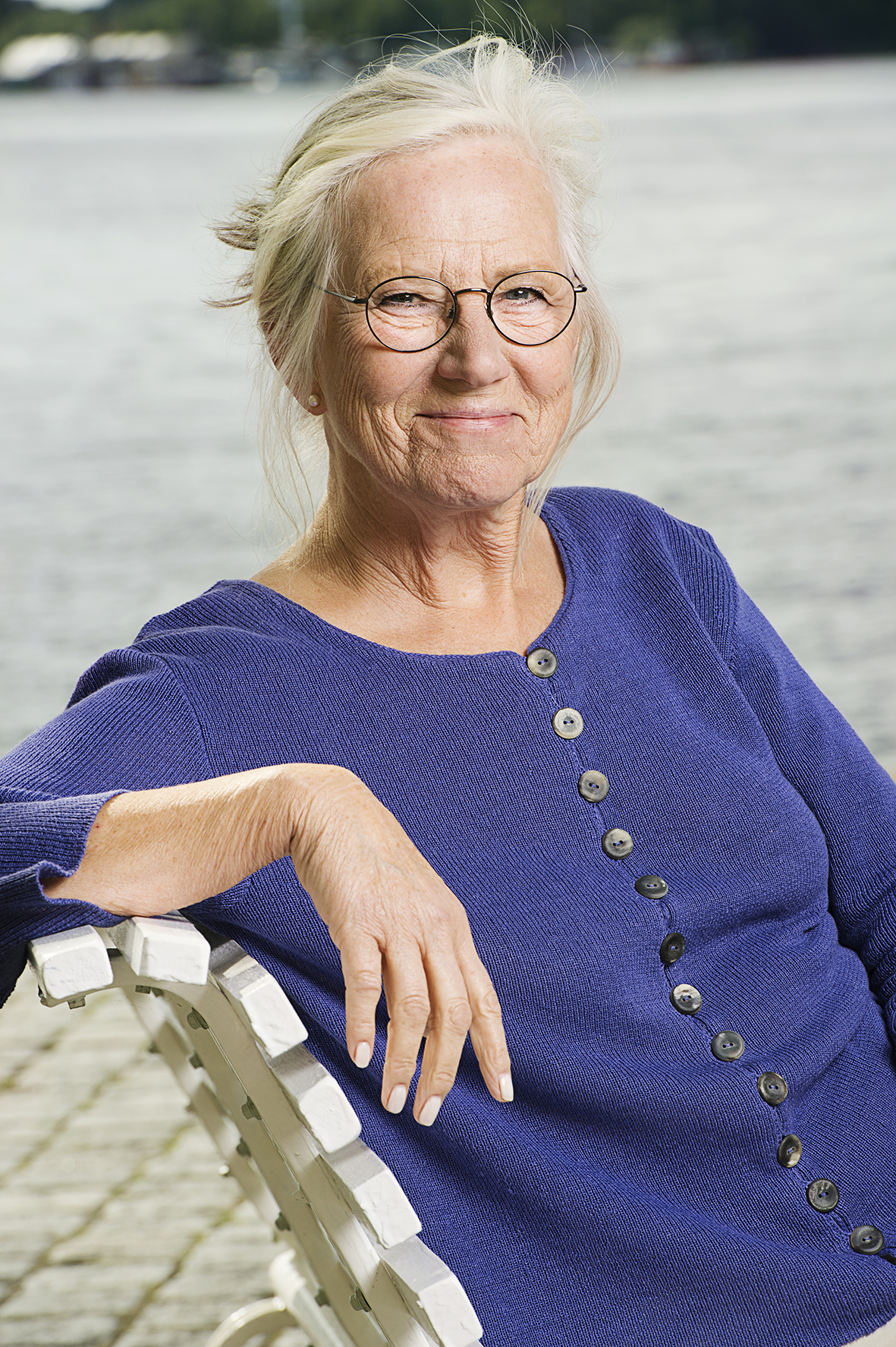
Jujja Wieslander (2014)

Jujja Wieslander (née Bergkvist; born 12 June 1944 in Stockholm) is a Swedish author of children's books, best known for her fictional character of Mamma Moo which was adapted into the animated feature film Mamma Moo and the Crow (2008). She was awarded the Expressens Heffaklump prize in 1993 and the Astrid Lindgren Prize in 2005.
