= Familjen Anderssons sjuka jul =

1998 Sveriges Radio Christmas calendar

- Author: Anders Jacobsson and Sören Olsson
- Illustrator: Sören Olsson
- Cover artist: Sören Olsson
- Language: Swedish
- Series: Sune
- Genre: Children, Young adult
- Set in: fictional town of Glimmerdagg, Sweden
- Published: 1998
- Publication place: Sweden
- ISBN: 91-29-64642-1
- Preceded by: Plugghästen Sune (1998)
- Followed by: Sune och klantpappan 1999)

Familjen Anderssons sjuka jul ("The Andersson Family's Sick Christmas") was the 1998 edition of Sveriges Radio's Christmas Calendar. Based on the Sune books, it was also released as a book in 1998.

== Plot ==
In the Andersson family, mother Karin suddenly turns ill. She has to rest, and is sent to the hospital. Rudolf, the father, has to take care of the family himself.

The series received positive reception for, among other things, tackling that Christmas is celebrated in remembrance of the birth of Jesus.
