= Agaton Sax and the Diamond Thieves =

1959 book by Nils-Olof Franzen

- Author: Nils-Olof Franzen
- Language: Swedish
- Published: 1959
- Publication place: Sweden

Agaton Sax and the Diamond Thieves (Swedish: Agaton Sax och de slipade diamanttjuvarna; published in English in 1965) is a book about detective Agaton Sax by Swedish author Nils-Olof Franzen. It was the first of the series to be published in English.

== Plot summary ==
The Koh-Mi-Nor diamond is stolen and a very clever thief is putting messages about it, in a secret code, in the personal column of the newspaper published by the Swedish detective Agaton Sax.
