= Rachel Mohlin =

Swedish actress and impressionist

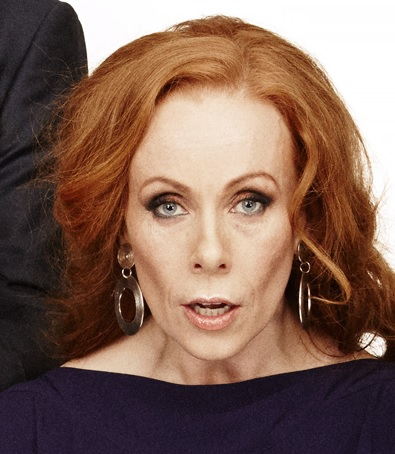
- Born: Rakel Maria Elisabeth Mohlin; 29 May 1973 (age 52); Skärstad, Sweden
- Occupation(s): Actress, impressionist
- Known for: Kvarteret Skatan

Rachel Maria Elisabeth Mohlin (born 29 May 1973) is a Swedish actress and impressionist. She is best known for her impressions of politicians and celebrities on Sveriges Radio's show Public Service, and as an actress in both comedic and drama roles. On television, she is perhaps best known for her role in the comedy series Kvarteret Skatan at SVT.

Mohlin was born in Skärstad, close to Jönköping, as Rakel Maria Elisabeth Molin. Since then she has changed the spelling of both her first and last name. During her youth she was interested in acting; her interest in comedy came from participation in a lucia cabaret and a number of sketch performances. From the age of sixteen, Mohlin was a member of the Allians-church, which was one of Jönköping's many free-church congregations. At the age of nineteen she left the church and in the 1990s she started to work as a teacher in arts while interning at Jönköpings länsteater. She studied further at Kulturama, and later at Skara Skolscen.

After her time as an intern in Skövde, she made her acting debut in the Kanal 5 soap opera Vänner och fiender; she participated in 695 episodes of the series. In 2003, she participated in the panel comedy show Snacka om nyheter at SVT. She has also had roles in the TV4 comedy series c/o Segemyhr and SVT's Män emellan. She has also participated in the Kanal 5 sketch comedy series Partaj, where she became known for her impression of Centerpartiet leader Annie Lööf.

More recently, she has had success as a member of the Sveriges Radio Sunday satire show Public Service, where she has become known for her impressions of Queen Silvia, Anitra Steen, Marita Ulvskog, Maud Olofsson and Gudrun Schyman. In 2004, she did voice acting as the fish Lola in Hajar som hajar, and acted in the films Håkan Bråkan and the Finnish-Swedish film Framom främsta linjen. In 2006, she acted in the film Den enskilde medborgaren. She has been a member of the comedy revue group R.E.A. (Roligt Elakt Aktuellt) since 2006.

In 2015, Mohlin joined Josephine Bornebusch on the comedy show Rachel och Jossan: Utan filter. The show was broadcast on TV3.
