= Everybody Loves Alice =

- Directed by: Richard Hobert
- Written by: Richard Hobert
- Produced by: Peter Possne
- Music by: Björn Hallman
- Distributed by: Sveriges Television; Film i Väst; Sonet Film
- Release date: 4 October 2002 (Sweden)
- Running time: 118 minutes
- Countries: Sweden, Norway
- Languages: Swedish, Norwegian

Everybody Loves Alice (Swedish: Alla älskar Alice) is a Swedish drama film which was released to cinemas in Sweden on 4 October 2002.

== Plot ==
Alice lives in a house with her brother, Pontus and parents, Johan and Lotta. It is revealed that Lotta doesn't love Johan and has also been having an affair. He later moves and lives with his "new" lover, Anna, who has a son called Patrik, a classmate of Alice.

The film includes Alice's problems dealing with Anna and her feelings of isolation.

== Cast ==
- Natalie Björk as Alice
- Bisse Unger as Pontus
- Marie Richardson as Lotta
- Mikael Persbrandt as Johan
- Marie Göranzon as Sonya, Lotta's mother
- Sverre Anker Ousdal as Henry, Lotta's father
- Hege Schøyen as Tina
- Anastasios Soulis as Patrik
- Lena Endre as Anna, Patrik's mother
- Per Svensson as Erik, teacher
- Mathilda Lundholm as Hanna
- Li Lundholm as Moa
- Marcus Ardai-Blomberg as Anton
- Pernilla August as the psychologist's voice
