= Bisse Unger =

Swedish former child actor (born 1994)

Bisse Fredrik Eric Albert Unger (born 17 February 1994) is a Swedish former child actor, well known for his role as Per in Håkan Bråkan & Josef.

== Selected filmography ==
- 1999 - En häxa i familjen
- 2002 - Alla älskar Alice
- 2002 - Outside Your Door
- 2002 - Bella – bland kryddor och kriminella (TV)
- 2002/2003 - Tusenbröder (TV)
- 2004 - Håkan Bråkan & Josef
- 2006 - Tusenbröder – Återkomsten
- 2006 - Mäklarna (TV)
- 2007 - Se upp för dårarna
- 2007 - Arn – The Knight Templar
- 2008 - Allt flyter
