= Tuva-Lisa =

Swedish children's book series by Anders Jacobsson and Sören Olsson

- Author: Anders Jacobsson and Sören Olsson
- Language: Swedish
- Series: Tuva-Lisa
- Genre: Children's novel
- Publisher: Kartonage
- Publication date: 1992
- Publication place: Sweden
- Media type: Print
- Pages: 106
- ISBN: 9129620686
- Followed by: Tuva-Lisa och vindens son

Tuva-Lisa is a 1992 children's novel by Swedish writers Anders Jacobsson and Sören Olsson. It was followed by two sequels. The novel was translated in Finnish by Tuula Kallioniemi.

The main character is Tuva-Lisa Johansson, a Swedish girl who is 12 years old (nearly 13). Her parents work in theater, and she has written her own plays for the stage and wants to become an actress. Her friend is Jessica.

Among the stage plays written by the character is Ett vemodigt tillstånd av tråkighet, depicting an old man reflecting on his life as a greengrocer.

== Books ==
Title	Year of publishing (Sweden)
Tuva-Lisa	1992
Tuva-Lisa och vindens son	1996
Tuva-Lisa och anden i glaset	2000

== In other languages than Swedish ==
- Finnish: Iida-Liisa
