= Trollkontroll =

- Directed by: Anders Jacobsson and Sören Olsson
- Country of origin: Sweden
- Original language: Swedish
- No. of seasons: 1
- No. of episodes: 8

Original release
- Network: TV2
- Release: 8 January – 26 February 1990

Trollkontroll is a TV series directed by Anders Jacobsson and Sören Olsson. It has eight episodes, and originally aired over TV2 between 8 January-26 February 1990.

== Plot ==
The main characters are three guardian angels and the three persons they are guardians for.
