= Nils Moritz =

Swedish actor (born 1943)

- Born: 5 May 1943 (age 83); Tallinn, Estonia
- Occupation: Actor
- Years active: 1987-2008

Nils Ragnar Moritz (born 5 May 1943) is a Swedish actor.

== Selected filmography ==
- 1987 - En film om kärlek
- 1988/1989 - Dårfinkar & dönickar (TV)
- 1989 - Ture Sventon, privatdetektiv (TV, Julkalendern)
- 1991 - Ture Sventon och fallet Isabella
- 1992 - Hassel – Botgörarna
- 1993 - Sune's Summer
- 1994 - Bert (TV series)
- 1995 - Tre Kronor (TV series)
- 1996 - Rederiet (TV)
- 1997 - Beck – Pensionat Pärlan
- 1999 - Vuxna människor
- 2001 - Jordgubbar med riktig mjölk
- 2002 - Livet i 8 bitar
- 2005 - Lasermannen (TV series)
- 2005 - Wallander – Mörkret
- 2006 - LasseMajas detektivbyrå (TV series)
- 2007 - Lögnens pris (TV)
- 2008 - De halvt dolda (TV)
