= Kvarteret Skatan =

Swedish television series

Kvarteret Skatan is a Swedish comedy series consisting of short sketches based on different characters that appears in each episode. The series was broadcast on SVT for three seasons between 2003 and 2006. And has turned into dinner shows and a film which premiered 16 March 2012 called Kvarteret Skatan reser till Laholm.
