= Lasse Brandeby =

Swedish actor, comedian and journalist

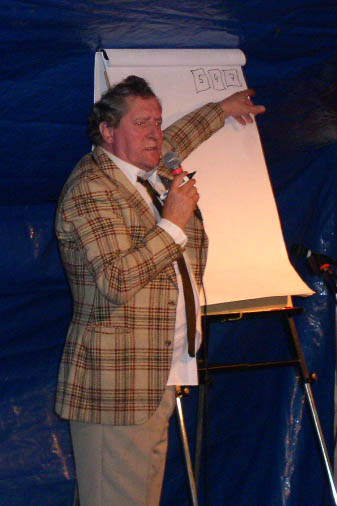
- Lasse Brandeby as Kurt Olsson at the summer camp of the Communist Party in Tiveden National Park June 2003.
- Born: Lars Thorsten Brandeby; 27 April 1945; Gothenburg, Sweden
- Died: 20 November 2011 (aged 66); Gothenburg, Sweden
- Occupation: Actor
- Known for: Kurt Olsson

Lasse Brandeby (27 April 1945 – 20 November 2011) was a Swedish actor, comedian and journalist.

== Biography ==
Brandeby was born in the Majorna district of Gothenburg. After receiving his degree in journalism he worked for Radio Sjuhärad. He debuted as an actor in the early 1980s on Nationalteatern in Gothenburg. He was best known for his quirky working-class character Kurt Olsson, a typical Gothenburg male, around whom several TV-shows and one feature film were made in the 1980s and 1990s. He was also known for his other comedic character Rolf Allan Mjunstedt in the TV series Rena rama Rolf, a Swedish language adaptation of The Honeymooners, where audiences also saw the breakthrough of comedian Robert Gustafsson.

During early 2007 he participated in the Swedish TV show Let's Dance with dance partner Ann Lähdet where he failed to reach the final three.

Brandeby died in Gothenburg on 20 November 2011 after suffering from prostate cancer, 66 years old.
