= Carina Lidbom =

Swedish actress and comedienne

- Born: SolBritt Carina Lidbom; 9 February 1957 (age 69); Östersund, Sweden
- Occupations: Actress, comedian
- Years active: 1988–present

Solbritt Carina Lidbom (born 9 February 1957) is a Swedish actress and comedian.

== Filmography ==
- 1988 - S.O.S. – En segelsällskapsresa
- 1989 - Det var då... (television series)
- 1991 - Sunes jul (television series)
- 1992 - Rederiet (television series)
- 1993 - Sune's Summer
- 1995 - Sjukan (television series)
- 1995 - Mördare utan Faceless Killers Wallander (film series) - Played Eva Strandberg in this four-part episode of the Swedish television series starring Rolf Lassgård as Kurt Wallander
- 1995 - Hundarna i Riga
- 1997 - Sanning eller konsekvens
- 1998 - Rederiet (television series)
