= Mamma Moo =

Fictitious cow

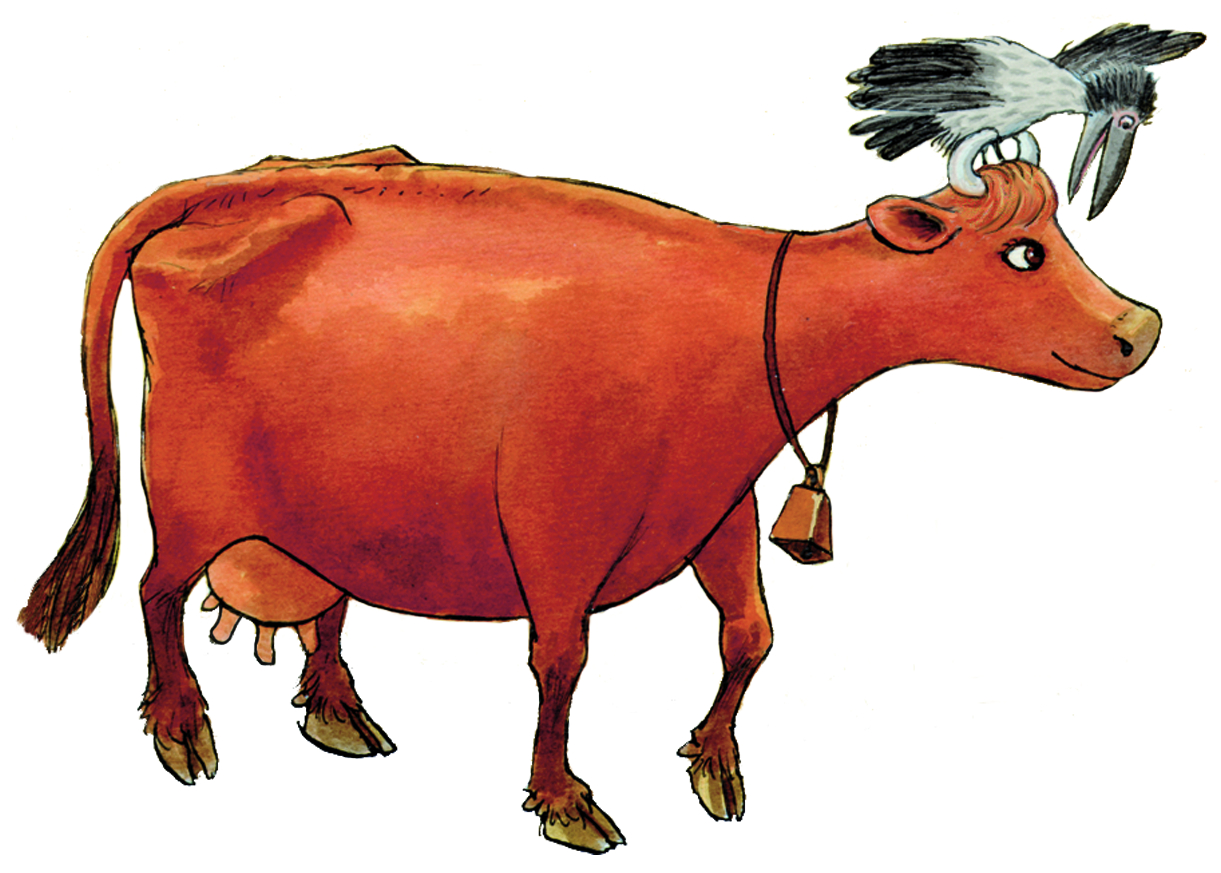
Mamma Moo and Crow as illustrated by Sven Nordqvist.

Mamma Moo and Crow (Swedish: Mamma Mu och Kråkan) are two fictional characters created by Jujja and Tomas Wieslander. They first appeared in 1985 with the LP albums Min lilla kråksång och Mamma Mu and visor för hela kroppen which aired on Barnradion. Mamma Moo and Crow where later developed into a children's books series, with Sven Nordqvist as illustrator.

The series revolves around Mamma Moo, a curious and playful cow, and her best friend. Crow, a sceptical and easily frightened crow.

The Swedish books were published by Natur & Kultur but have been published by Rabén & Sjögren since 2015. The books have been translated in over 30 languages.

== Books ==
- Mamma Mu och Kråkan (1991)
- Mamma Mu gungar (1993)
- Mamma Mu åker bobb (1994)
- Mamma Mu bygger koja (1995)
- Mamma Mu städar (1997)
- Mamma Mu åker rutschkana (2003)
- Mamma Mu klättrar i träd (2005)
- Mamma Mu får ett sår (2006)
- Mamma Mu och Kråkans jul (2008)
- Mamma Mu läser (2011)
- Stora boken om Mamma Mu och Kråkan (2012)
- Mamma Mu simmar (2014)
- Mera fart Mamma Mu! (2016)
- Mamma Mu låtsas (2018)
- När Mamma Mu mötte Kråkan första gången (2020)
- Mamma Mu blir ledsen (2024)
