= Sune (book series) =

Swedish children's-youth book series by Anders Jacobsson and Sören Olsson

Sune series
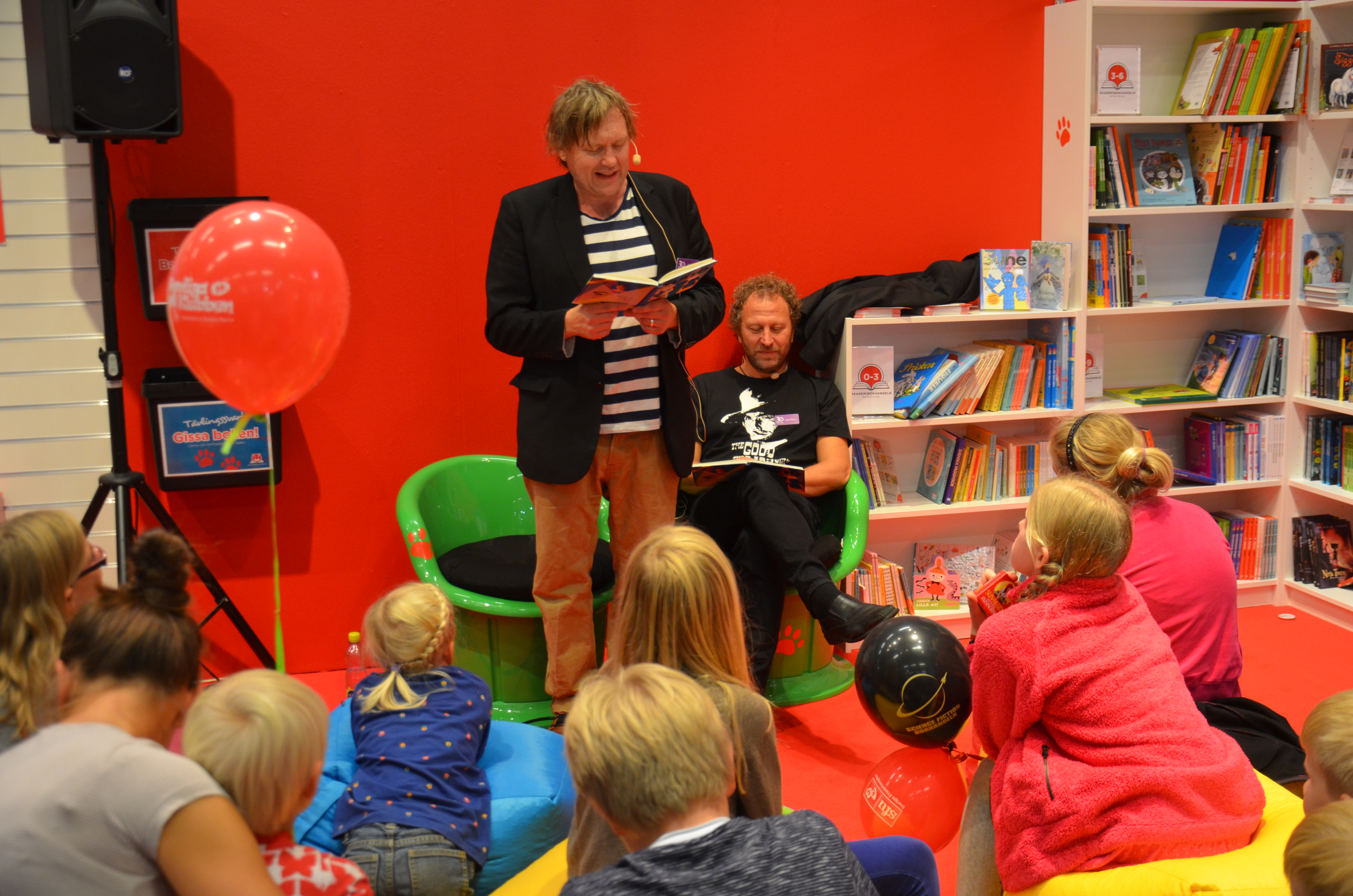
- Anders Jacobsson and Sören Olsson read from a Sune book during the 2014 Gothenburg Book Fair
- Author: Anders Jacobsson and Sören Olsson
- Illustrator: Sören Olsson
- Country: Sweden
- Language: Swedish
- Genre: children
- Publisher: Rabén & Sjögren
- Published: 1984-

The Sune series is a series of books for children and young adults, published since 1984, by Swedish writers Anders Jacobsson and Sören Olsson. The stories were originally 90 episodes made for the Swedish Radio and broadcast in 1983–93. The stories are set in the fictional town of Glimmerdagg ("Dew glimmer") in central Sweden, situated "somewhere between Karlskoga and Örebro", with the Söderskolan ("South School") for children age 7-13. The books are written in a present tense, third-person narrative and using imperfect for flashback scenes.

== Sune ==
Sune Andersson (full name: Karl Sune Rudolf Andersson) is a Swedish schoolboy, living in a two-storey, single-family house with his father Rudolf who works in an office, mother Karin who is a librarian, big sister Anna, and little brother Håkan "Bråkan" ("Hakan the Menace"). In the third book Självklart, Sune, Sune's little sister Isabelle, is born.

Just like Bert in Bert Diaries, a similar book series by Jacobsson and Olsson, Sune is interested in girls, and refers to himself as a "girl charmer" (Swedish: tjejtjusare). His childhood friend and girlfriend is Sophie Blixt, but Sune also shows interest in other girls, as long as they are not mean.

== Background ==
In 1983 Anders Jacobsson worked in a primary school in Karlskoga. Little had changed since he himself was in first grade, children played similar games and books for children and young adults were pretty much the same. Jacobsson heard that the local Örebro radio station was looking for a radio program that could be about anything, as long as it had a local connection. Jacobsson wrote an episode about Sune, recorded it in his own studio, and sent it to the station. The episode was well received and he was asked to make a Sune series. Jacobsson wrote more episodes and soon listeners called demanding to hear the rest of Sagan om Sune ("the Tale About Sune"). Soon after that, the stories about Sune were broadcast to all of Örebro County. Many people listened to Sune at work and at home. He was a 7-year-old boy in first grade who had a friend called Joakim Fröberg. Sune was not the typical "tough guy" who used to fight or play soccer, instead he was more interested in girls.

Local publisher Hegas contacted Jacobsson and asked if they could publish a book with the stories about Sune. Olsson illustrated the resulting book Sagan om Sune, published just before Christmas in 1984. The second book was Sune börjar tvåan ("Sune Starts Second Grade") 1985, Olsson also took part in the writing. The third book, Självklart, Sune ("Of Course, Sune") 1986, was a collaboration with both of them as writers. Jacobsson and Olsson had originally planned to conclude the Sune series with Sune och Svarta Mannen ("Sune and the Dark Man") 1989, to work on the Bert series they had started two years earlier. Instead both series continued.

Two series of the Swedish Television Christmas calendars are based on the Sune books: Sunes jul ("Sune's Christmas") 1991 and Håkan Bråkan 2003. In 1998, Familjen Anderssons sjuka jul ("The Andersson Family's Sick Christmas") was the Swedish Radio calendar. The film Sune's Summer based on the book Sunes sommar premiered in 1993 and the film Håkan Bråkan & Josef was released in 2004.

== Television series ==
The animated television series The World of Tosh features the 9-year-old Sune. In the series, Sophie acts more like a tomboy and Sune does not seem to fall in love with her. They also have a friend, Herman, an intelligent but quiet guy.

== Books ==
- 1984 – Sagan om Sune ("The Tale About Sune")
- 1985 – Sune börjar tvåan ("Sune Starts the Second Grade")
- 1986 – Självklart, Sune ("Of Course, Sune")
- 1989 – Sune och Svarta Mannen ("Sune and the Dark Man")
- 1989 – Tjejtjusaren Sune ("Sune, the Girl Charmer")
- 1991 – Duktigt, Sune! ("Well Done, Sune!")
- 1992 – Sunes jul ("Sune's Christmas")
- 1994 – Sunes sommar ("Sune's Summer")
- 1994 – Supersnuten Sune ("Sune, the Super Cop")
- 1995 – Sune älskar Sophie ("Sune Loves Sophie")
- 1996 – Sunes hjärnsläpp ("Sune's Brain Drop")
- 1997 – Sunes hemligheter ("Sune's Secrets")
- 1997 – Gult är fult, Sune ("Yellow is Ugly, Sune")
- 1998 – Plugghästen Sune ("Sune, the Swot")
- 1998 – Sune och familjen Anderssons sjuka jul ("Sune and the Andersson Family's Sick Christmas")
- 1999 – Sune och klantpappan ("Sune and the Clumsy Father")
- 2000 – Sunes största kärlekar ("Sune's Greatest Loves")
- 2001 – Släkten är värst, Sune ("Meet the Parents, Sune")
- 2002 – Sune och Mamma Mysko ("Sune and the Weird Mother")
- 2003 – Sune och Tant Tonåring ("Sune and the Teenage Lady")
- 2004 – Allt är guld, Sune ("Everything is Golden, Sune")
- 2005 – Sune och syster vampyr ("Sune and Sister Vampire")
- 2006 – Spik och panik Sune ("Nails and Panic, Sune")
- 2007 – Fy katten, Sune ("Red Cats, Sune")
- 2008 – Sunes tusen tjusarknep ("Sune's Thousand Charming Tricks")
- 2009 – Sune i Grekland ("Sune in Greece")
- 2010 – Skämtaren Sune ("Sune the Joker")
- 2011 – Sunes skolresa ("Sune's School Trip")
- 2012 – Sune och tjejhatarligan ("Sune and the Girl-Hating Gang")
- 2012 – Sune: the Superstar!
- 2013 – Sune och roboten Rudolf ("Sune and Rudolf, the Robot")
- 2014 – Sune på bilsemester ("Sune on Car Vacation")
- 2015 – Sune i fjällen ("Sune in the Scandinavian Mountains")
- 2015 – Sune i Ullared ("Sune in Ullared")

== Films ==
Title	Year	Language
Sune's Summer	1993	Swedish
Sunes familie	1997	Danish
The Anderssons in Greece	2012	Swedish
The Anderssons Hit the Road	2013	Swedish
The Anderssons Rock the Mountains	2014	Swedish
Sune vs. Sune	2018	Swedish
Sune – Best Man	2019	Swedish
Sune – Uppdrag midsommar	2021	Swedish

== Characters ==
Andersson family:

- Sune (Tosh)
- Karin, mother
- Rudolf (Ralph), father
- Anna, big sister (4 years older than Sune)
- Håkan "Bråkan" (Max), little brother (2 years younger than Sune, "Bråkan" is a play on the Swedish word bråk ("fight") cf. the name "Dennis the Menace")
- Isabelle, little sister (born in book 3, Självklart, Sune, 9 years younger than Sune)

Blixt family (Johnson family):

- Sophie Blixt, Sune's girlfriend
- Yvonne, mother
- Ragnar (Fred), father
- Pär "Päron" (Timothy), Håkan's friend

Sune's classmates:

- Joakim Fröberg, Sune's best friend
- Maria Perez

Other characters:

- Ulla-Lena Frid, Sune's teacher in primary school
- Herman, Sune's friend

== See also ==
- Bert Diaries
