= Kenny Begins =

- Directed by: Carl Åstrand; Mats Lindberg
- Written by: Carl Åstrand; Lars Johansson; Mats Lindberg
- Produced by: Patrick Ryborn
- Starring: Johan Rheborg; Björn Gustafsson; Bill Skarsgård; Pernilla August; Johan Glans; Brasse Brännström; Sissela Kyle; Jan Mybrand
- Distributed by: S/S Fladen Film; Nordisk Film
- Release date: 25 March 2009
- Running time: 87 minutes
- Country: Sweden
- Language: Swedish
- Budget: $6.8 million

Kenny Begins is a 2009 Swedish comedy science fiction film directed by Carl Åstrand and Mats Lindberg. Johan Rheborg stars as Kenny Starfighter, an aspiring galaxy hero who crash lands on Earth. The film is made as a stand-alone prequel to the 1997 television series Kenny Starfighter. It holds the record for most special effects in a Swedish film, displacing the previous recordholder, Frostbite.

== Plot ==
Kenny Starfighter (Johan Rheborg) is probably the most hopeless student that the Hero academics of the galaxy has ever had. His parents Benny (Per Mårtenson) and Jenny (Sissela Kyle) are tired of paying for his studies and give him an ultimatum: graduate or become a hairdresser at the family salon.

In a despondent hunt for graduation points, he crash-lands on Earth by mistake. He meets Pontus (Bill Skarsgård), a limping and bullied 15-year-old with bad eyesight. Pontus has accidentally found a mysterious and luminary power crystal that has given him superpower and the chance to be noticed by the coolest girl in school, Miranda (Carla Abrahamsen).

While Pontus tries to help Kenny escape from becoming a hairdresser, Rutger Oversmart (Jan Mybrand), the most intelligent man in the universe, finds out that the power of the crystal has been absorbed by Pontus. All he just needs to squeeze the power out of Pontus, and then he will become the most powerful man in the universe. When he finds out that a hero from the galaxy is protecting Pontus, he sends one of the most dangerous bounty hunters, Earth, Wind and Fire, to go get him.

== Cast ==
- Johan Rheborg as Kenny Starfighter
- Bill Skarsgård as Pontus
- Carla Abrahamsen as Miranda
- Jan Mybrand as Rutger Oversmart
- Brasse Brännström as General Sudoko
- Björn Gustafsson as Lenny Starfighter
- Cecilia Frode as Thug 1
- Per Svensson as Thug 2
- Josephine Bornebusch as Thug 3
- Pernilla August as Headmaster
- Sissela Kyle as Jenny Starfighter
- Johan Glans as Captain Kaos
- Per Ragnar as Emperor Zing
- Rosie Anderberg as Earth
- Yan Kai Yu as Wind
- Hayes Jemide as Fire

== Gallery ==
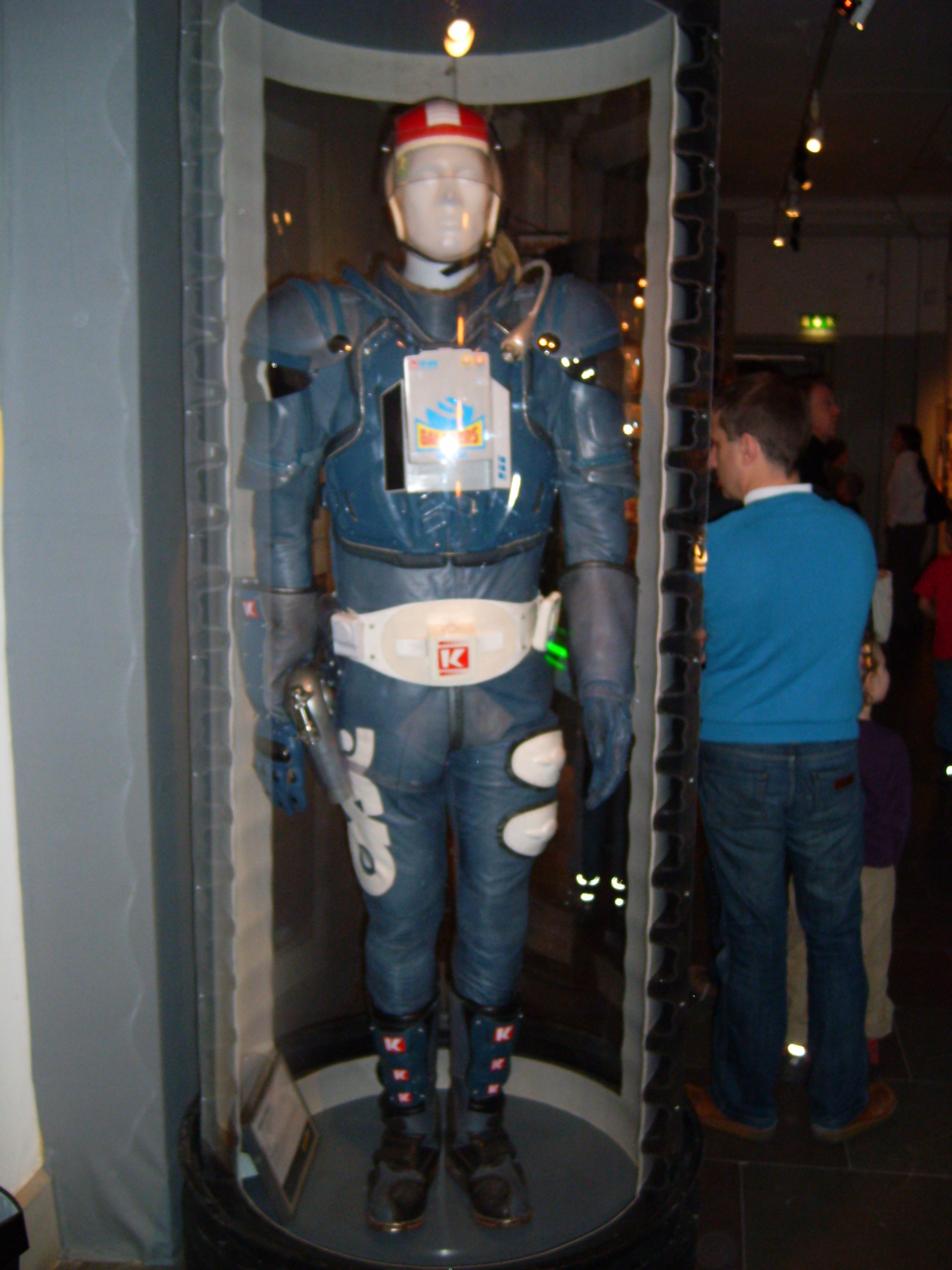
Kenny Starfighter's suit

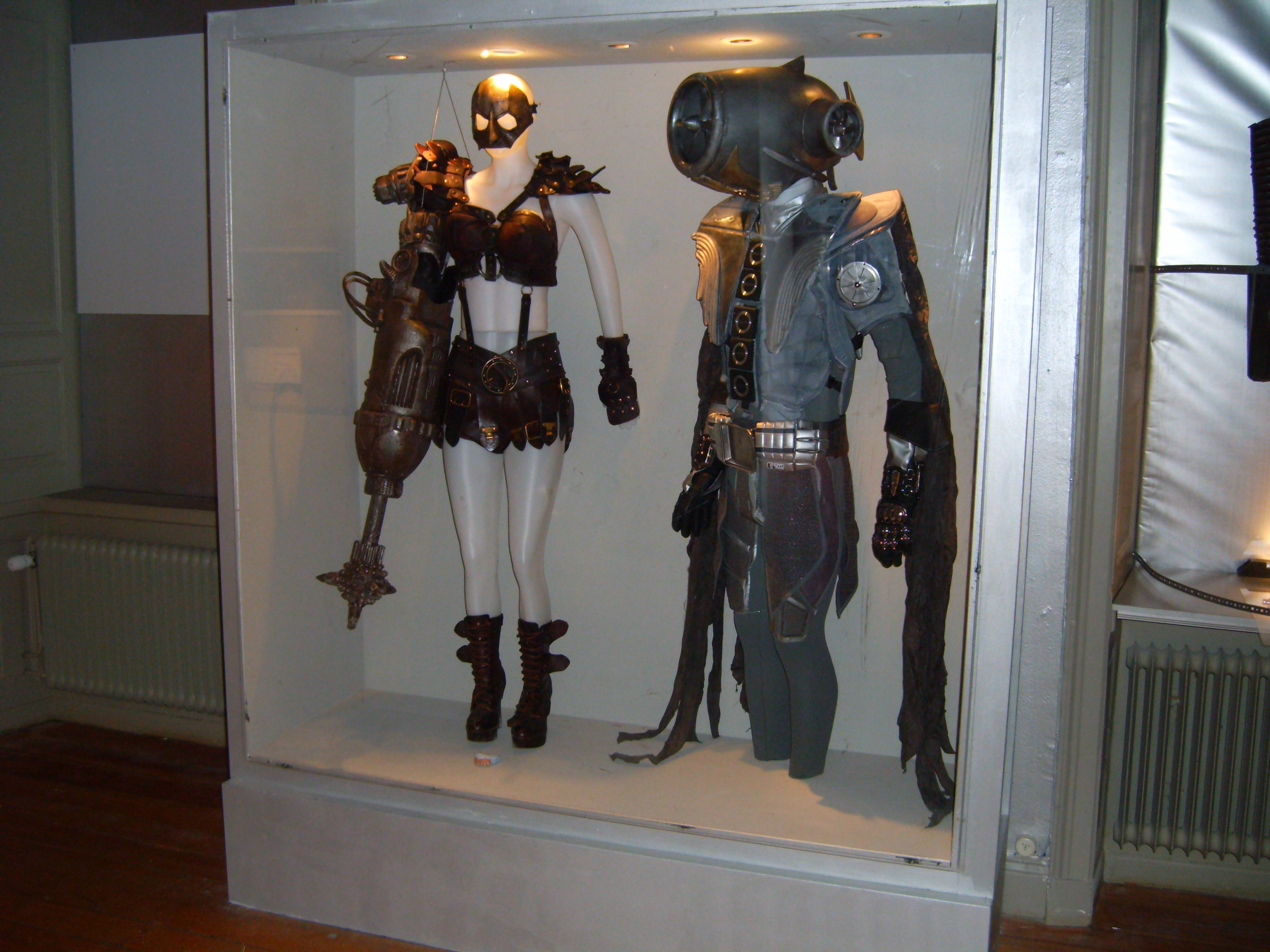
Earth and Wind

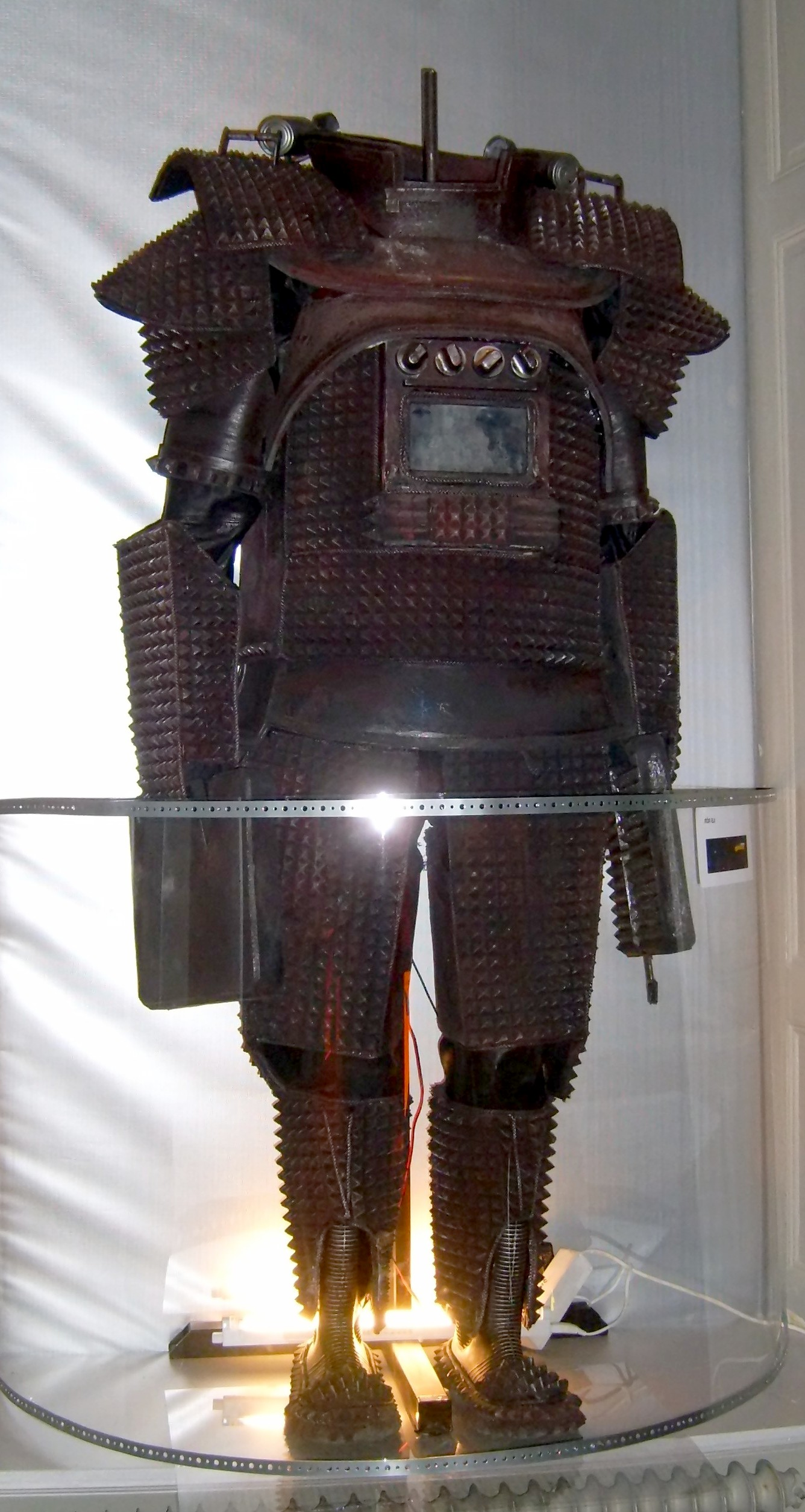
Fire

== See also ==
- Kenny Starfighter
- List of comedy science fiction films
