= Tam Sventon =

- First appearance: Ture Sventon, privatdetektiv (1948)
- Last appearance: Ture Sventon i Venedig (1973)
- Created by: Åke Holmberg

In-universe information
- Gender: male
- Occupation: private investigator
- Nationality: Swedish

Tam Sventon (Swedish: Ture Sventon) is a fictional private detective based in Stockholm, the main character in nine well-known Swedish children's books written by Åke Holmberg between 1948 and 1973. He is characterized by eating semlor, not being able to pronounce "s" in many situations (for instance, he says "temla" instead of "semla"), and riding on a flying carpet.

Several of the books were translated into English by Lilian Seaton. In the English versions, semlas are replaced by hot cross buns.

Between 1969 and 1975, comics based on the books were also published, drawn by the books' main illustrator Sven Hemmel. A few of these episodes have been collected into albums.

The books have also been adapted into film, two times as feature films (1972 and 1991), and two times as TV series (1989 and 2019).

== The books ==
- Ture Sventon, privatdetektiv (1948), English: Tam Sventon, Private Detective
- Ture Sventon i öknen (1949), English: Tam Sventon, Desert Detective
- Ture Sventon i London (1950)
- Ture Sventon i Paris (1953)
- Ture Sventon i Stockholm (1954), English: Tam Sventon and the Silver-Plate Gang
- Ture Sventon och Isabella (1955)
- Ture Sventon i spökhuset (1965)
- Ture Sventon i varuhuset (1968), English: Tam Sventon and Discovery P3X
- Ture Sventon i Venedig (1973)

== Notes ==
- Ture Sventon at WorldCat
- Tam Sventon at WorldCat
