= Gabriel Odenhammar =

Swedish actor

- Born: 23 November 1983 (age 42)
- Occupation: Actor
- Years active: 1983–present

Gabriel Odenhammar (born 23 November 1983) is a Swedish actor known for his role as Sune's brother Håkan in Sunes jul and Sune's Summer.
