= Åke Holmberg =

Swedish writer and translator

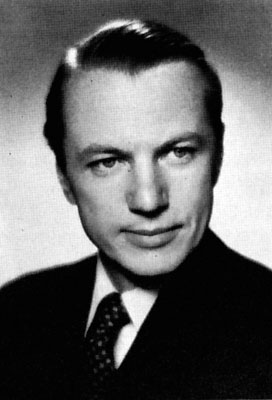
- Åke Holmberg
- Born: 31 May 1907; Stockholm, Sweden
- Died: 9 September 1991 (aged 84); Stockholm, Sweden
- Occupation: writer
- Writing career
- Language: Swedish
- Period: 1946–1986
- Genre: children
- Notable work: Tam Sventon

Åke Robert Holmberg (31 May 1907 – 9 September 1991) was a Swedish writer and translator, most famous for his nine children's books about detective Tam Sventon (Swedish: Ture Sventon).

== Biography ==
Holmberg studied at Stockholm University College and graduated with a bachelor's degree in 1934. He then worked for several years at the Nordic Museum in Stockholm, and became a full-time author in 1946. Holmberg wrote exclusively youth books, with one exception: the adult novel En frukost i Aquileia (A breakfast in Aquileia) from 1967.

Åke Holmberg was awarded Svenska Dagbladet Literature Prize in 1948 (together with Stina Aronson, Vilgot Sjöman, Ragnar Bengtsson and Bengt V. Wall). In 1961, he became the recipient of the Nils Holgersson Plaque, and in 2007 he posthumously received the award Temmelburken at the Gothenburg Book Fair. In addition to his own books, Holmberg also translated more than 20 books, mainly children's and youth books, from Danish, English and German. Åke Holmberg bequeathed all future copyright payments to a foundation, the Åke and Vera Holmberg's scholarship fund.
