= Anders Jacobsson and Sören Olsson =

Swedish late 20th century-early 21st century children's and youth writers

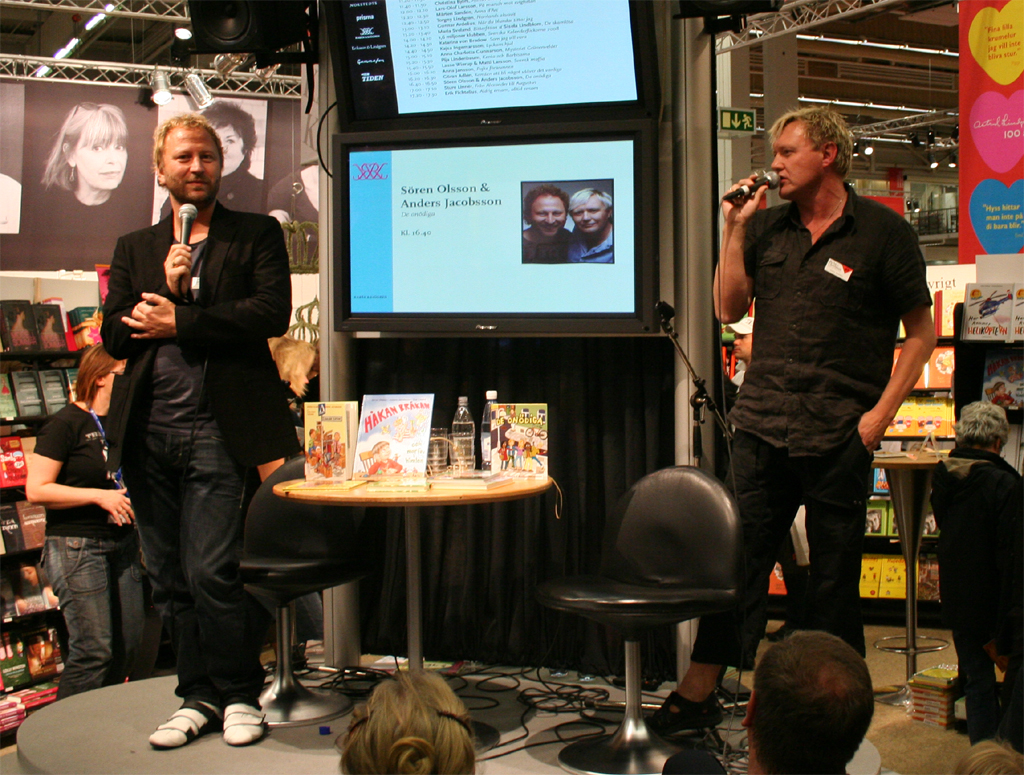
Sören Olsson (left) and Anders Jacobsson (right) at the Gothenburg Book Fair in 2007.

Anders Jacobsson (born 1963) and Sören Olsson (born 1964) are two Swedish-born cousins who are writers of children's literature and young adult fiction. They are best known for their books about Sune and Bert, but also Tuva-Lisa and Emanuel. They have also written the scripts of several television series.

Their inspiration comes from their own youth, and talking to young adults (when visiting schools) and their own imagination. Sören Olsson has illustrated the Sune books and the first Bert book, while the other Bert books, in the old Bert book series, were illustrated by Sonja Härdin. Recordings and radio broadcasts consist of Anders reading Sune, and Sören reading Bert.

The cousins have also created music together, as the act Hemliga byrån. Their most famous song is Hej, hej, hemskt mycket hej, which became a hit song in Sweden reaching Svensktoppen in 1987.

The Sune and Bert books have been published in the US, Germany, Russia, Austria, Switzerland, Finland, Norway, Denmark, Iceland, the Netherlands, Estonia, Latvia, Lithuania, Poland, the Czech Republic, Slovakia and Spain.

== Anders Jacobsson ==
Anders Jacobsson
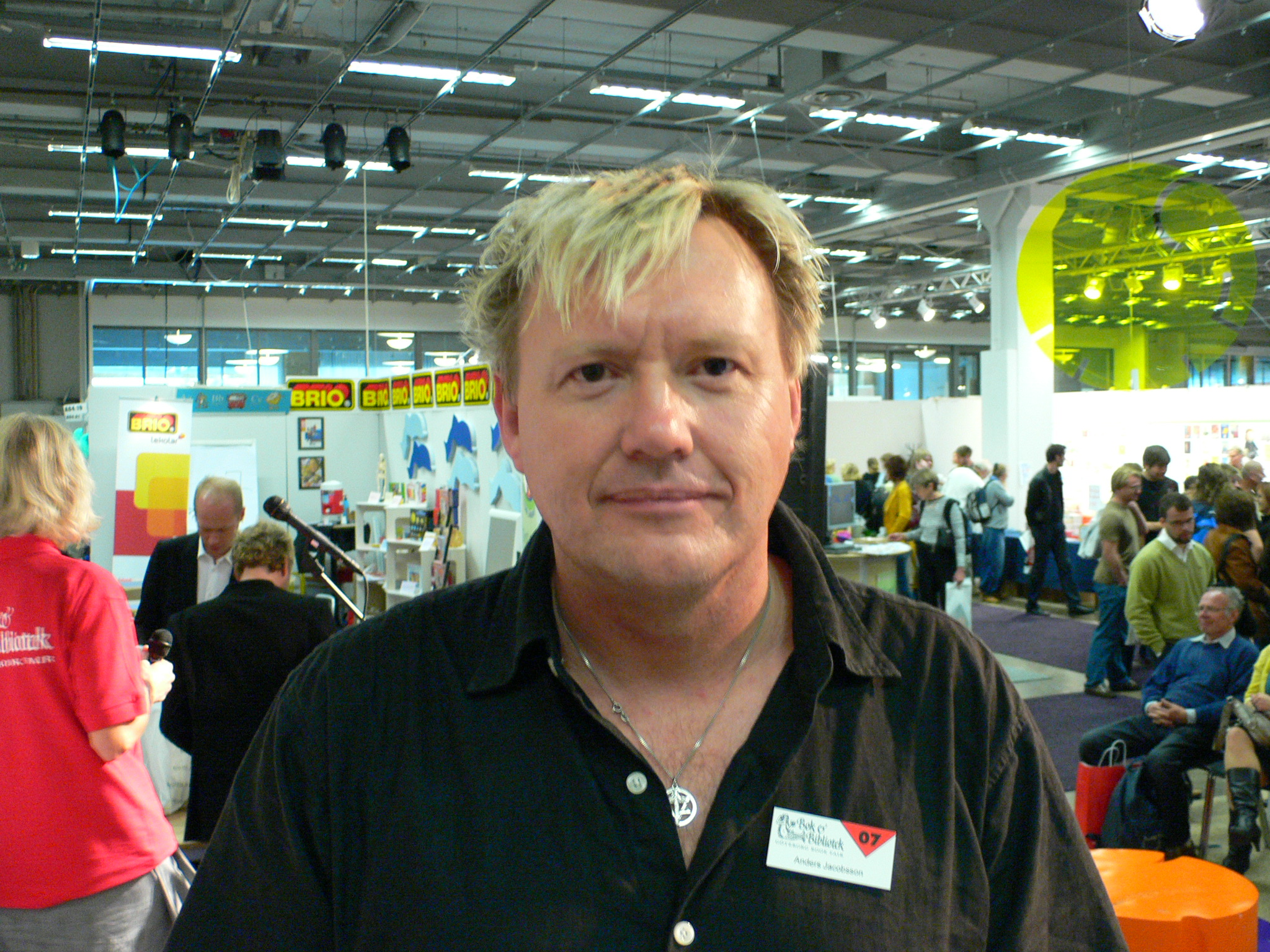
- Anders Jacobsson at the Gothenburg Book Fair in 2007.
- Born: Jan Anders Jacobsson; 4 August 1963 (age 63)

As a child, Jacobsson lived in Karlskoga, Köping, Lidköping, Arvika and Karlskoga. He attended school there. In politics, he called himself a "liberal anarchist".

During the early 1980s, he worked as an assistant teacher at a school in Karlskoga, coming into contact with children's games, activities, emotions and books. Not much had changed since his own first school years. When another assistant teacher said he was to write a children's book, Anders thought he also could, and began writing about seven-year-old Sune. He recorded an episode in his home studio, sending it to local radio programme "Allemansradion" ("Everyman's Radio"), where people could submit their own recordings.

A person working for the radio station liked Sune, and asked Jacobsson if he could create an entire series for the local municipal district radio. Local demand began to increase, and broadcasting of Sune soon began all over local radio. Anders sent the script to Rabén & Sjögren in Stockholm, who disliked the idea of turning a radio series into a book. Anders continued writing for local radio, where Sune was popular, before another book publishing company wanted to release the Sune book. The illustrator was Sören Olsson, and Sagan om Sune ("The Tale About Sune") was released in 1984.

== Sören Olsson ==
Sören Olsson
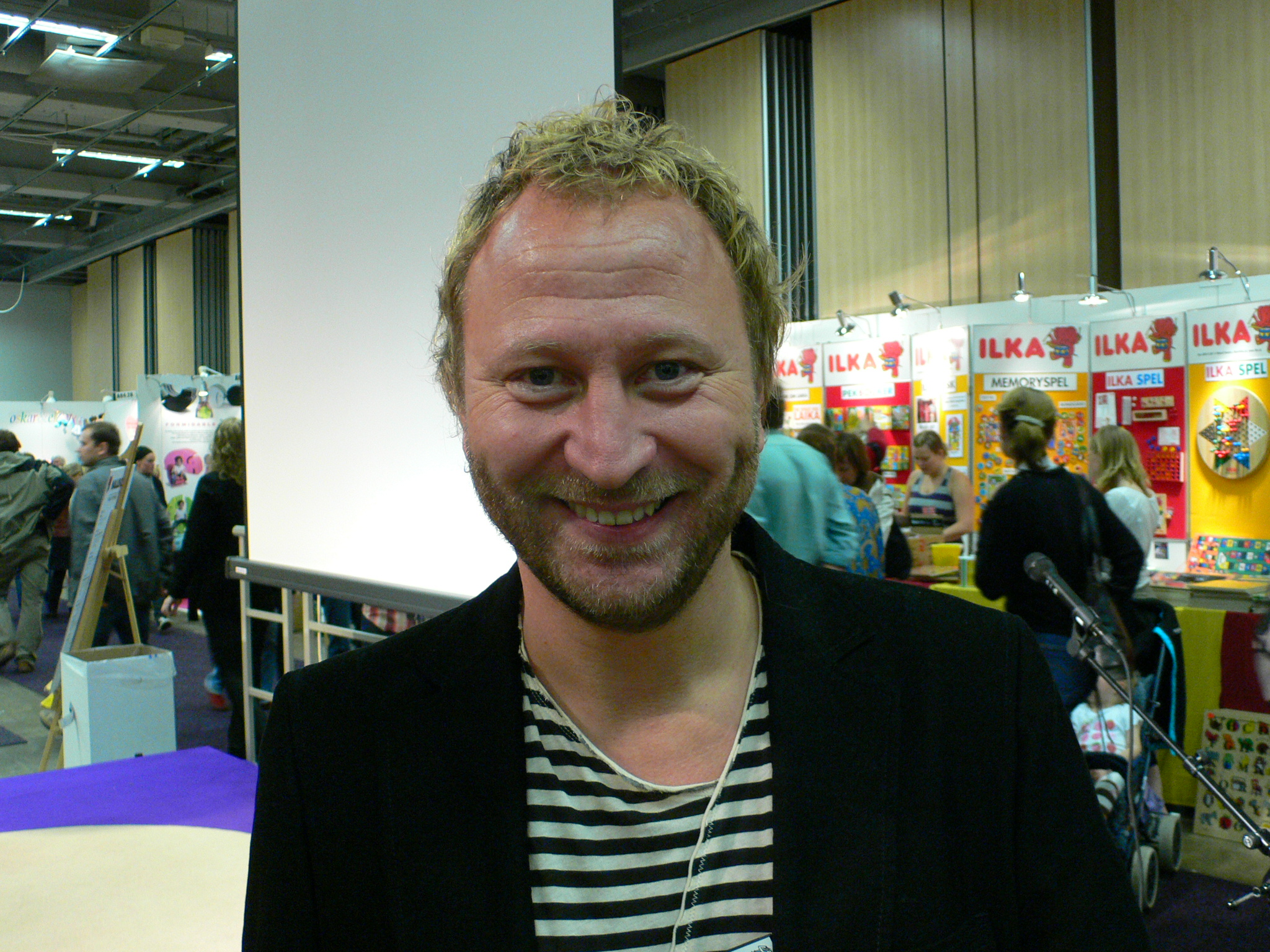
- Sören Olsson at the Gothenburg Book Fair in 2007.
- Born: Leif Sören Gustav Olsson; 16 March 1964 (age 62)

As a child, Sören Olsson liked drawing people and houses, and imagining adventures. He often questioned school's role in society, and wanted to become a pop music star. He starting by playing the electric bass in local pop bands and created his own record label at the age of 18. He also began working with theatre, and soon wanted to become an actor. He applied for several schools, and took a preparatory course at Örebro. At the same time, his cousin Anders moved to Örebro for studying, and soon the writers began working together.

== Working together ==
In 1985, Anders applied to go to an academy without knowing Sören had applied for a school in the same town. When Anders continued writing Sune, Sören also begun working on the books. From the Självklart, Sune they were working together.

When writing Sune och Svarta Mannen ("Sune and Black Men"), the writers wanted to get Sune "out of the picture", and sent him moving to another town, while working with another character, the diarist Bert, and working on Berts dagbok ("Bert's Diary"). They wanted to continue with Sune though, allowing the Sune series to exist in parallel with the Bert series.

The Bert series is set in the fictional town of Öreskoga; its name combines the writers' hometowns of Örebro and Karlskoga. The Sune series is also set in a fictional town, named "Glimmerdagg".

== Bibliography ==
- Sune
- Bert
- Emanuel
- Tuva-Lisa
- Storasyster & Lillebror
- Kalle & Kasper

== Prizes and awards ==
- 1993-1994: Rosa propellern, prize awarded for Sunes sommar ("Sune's Summer").
- 1994: The Golden Chest award given to the Bert television series for the "best manuscript". Sold to Germany, the Netherlands and Finland.
- 1995-1996: Film festival in Bulgaria, award to the Bert film for "best manuscript".
- 1999: Bokjuryn, category 14–19 years.
