= 43rd Guldbagge Awards =

Swedish awards ceremony

- Date: 21 January 2008
- Site: Cirkus, Stockholm
- Hosted by: Sissela Kyle

Highlights
- Best Picture: You, the Living
- Most awards: You, the Living (3)
- Most nominations: Darling (6)

Television coverage
- Network: SVT

The 43rd Guldbagge Awards ceremony, presented by the Swedish Film Institute, honored the best Swedish films of 2007, and took place on 21 January 2008. You, the Living directed by Roy Andersson was presented with the award for Best Film.

== Winner and nominees ==
=== Awards ===
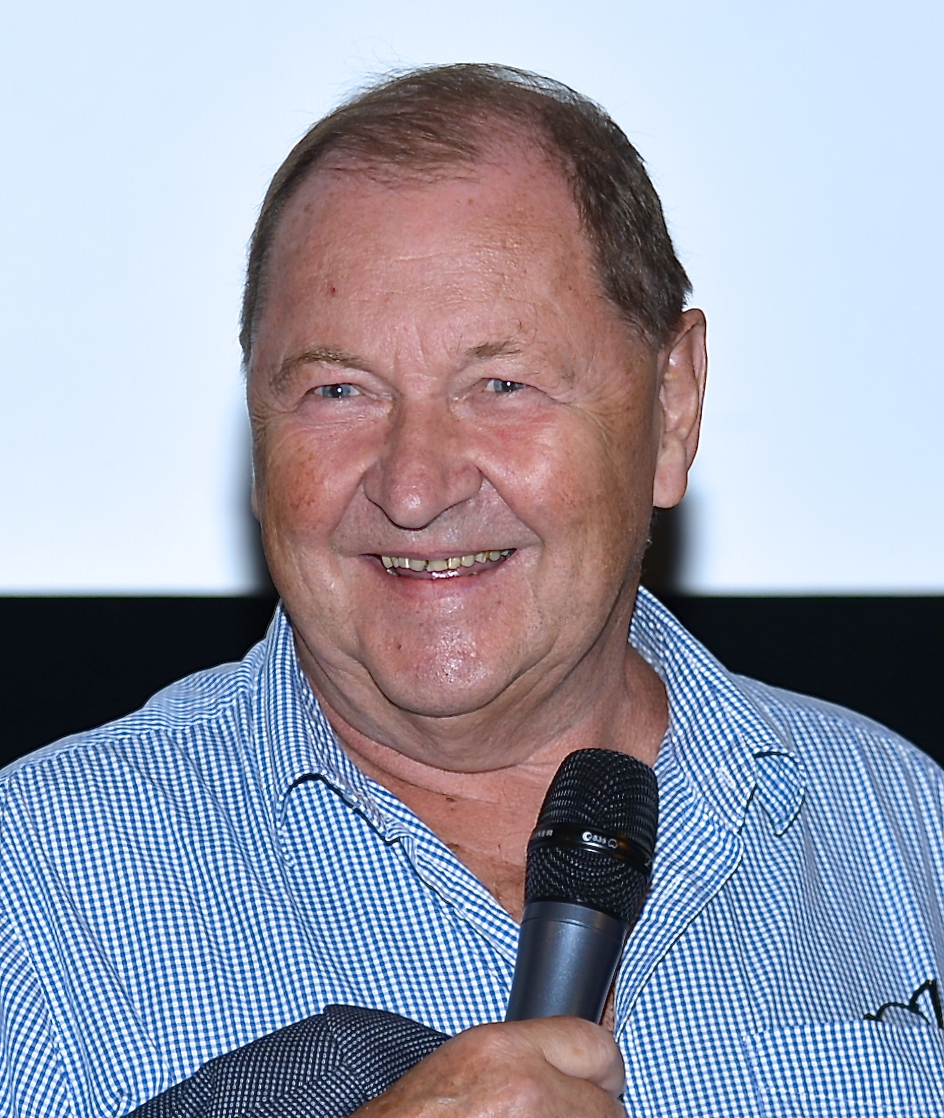
Roy Andersson, Best Director and Screenplay winner

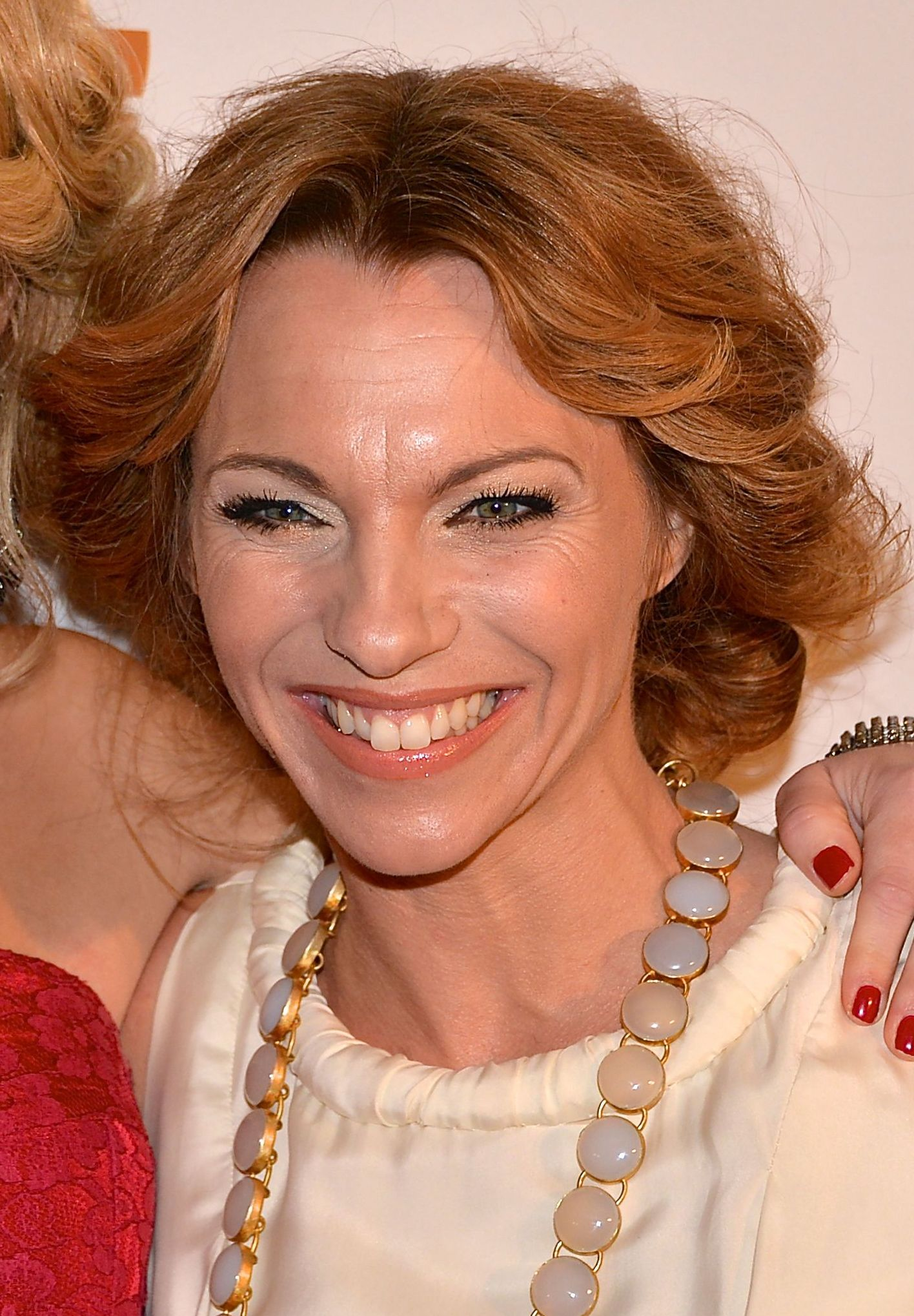
Sofia Ledarp, Best Actress winner

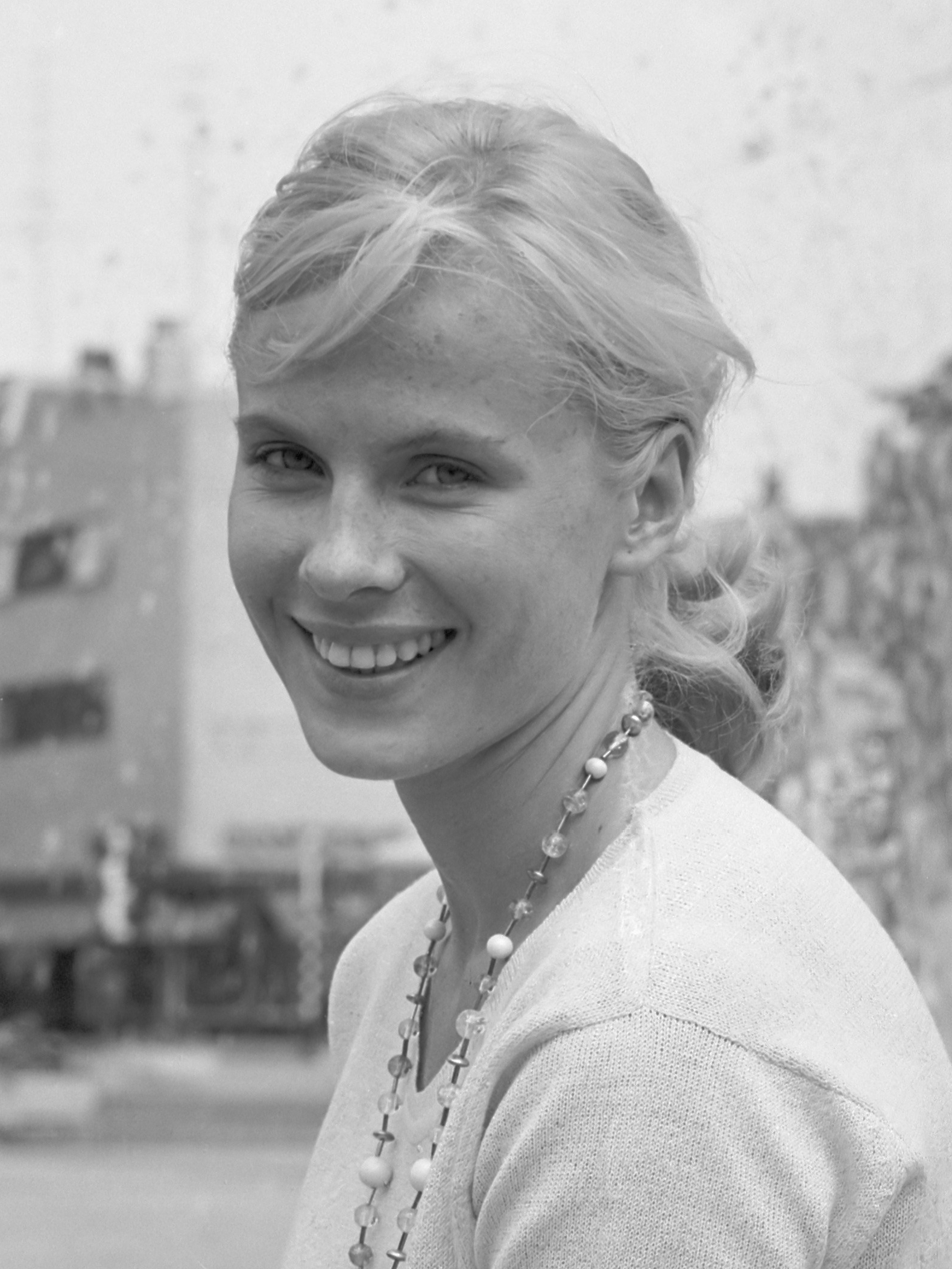
Bibi Andersson, Best Supporting Actress winner

Best Film: You, the Living – Pernilla Sandström and Philippe Bober; Darling – Fredrik Heinig; Leo – Anna Anthony	Best Director: Roy Andersson – You, the Living; Johan Kling – Darling; Josef Fares – Leo
Best Actress in a leading role: Sofia Ledarp – To Love Someone; Julia Högberg – The New Man; Michelle Meadows – Darling	Best Actor in a leading role: Michael Segerström – Darling; Jonas Karlsson – To Love Someone; Leonard Terfelt – Leo
Best Supporting Actress: Bibi Andersson – Arn – The Knight Templar; Maria Lundqvist – The New Man; Gunilla Nyroos – Nina Frisk	Best Supporting Actor: Hassan Brijany – Ett öga rött; Dan Ekborg – Mind the Gap; Nicolaj Schröder – Hata Göteborg
Best Screenplay: Roy Andersson – You, the Living; Johan Kling – Darling; Kjell Sundstedt – The New Man	Best Cinematography: Geir Hartly Andreassen – Darling; Eric Kress – Arn – The Knight Templar; Gustav Danielsson – You, the Living
Best Documentary Feature: The Nun – Maud Nycander; Aching Heart – Oscar Hedin; Paradise – Jerzy Sladkowski	Best Shortfilm: Hur man gör – Gunilla Heilborn, Kim Hiorthøy and Mårten Nilsson; Juni – Fijona Jonuzi; Lucky Blue – Håkan Liu
Best Foreign Film: (United Kingdom) This Is England – Shane Meadows; (Romania) 4 Months, 3 Weeks and 2 Days – Cristian Mungiu; (Germany) (Turkey) The Edge of Heaven – Fatih Akın	Honorary Award: Gösta Ekman, director and actor
Gullspiran: Ulf Stark,	Cinema Audience Award: Arn – The Knight Templar; Ett öga rött; Wonderful and Loved by All
Best Achievement: Kimmo Rajala, stunt coordinator; Kicki Ilander, costume designer; Pär Brundin, Frida Hallberg and Charlotta Miller, casting directors

== See also ==
- 80th Academy Awards
- 65th Golden Globe Awards
- 61st British Academy Film Awards
- 14th Screen Actors Guild Awards
- 13th Critics' Choice Awards
- 28th Golden Raspberry Awards
