= Fictionalized portrayals of George W. Bush =

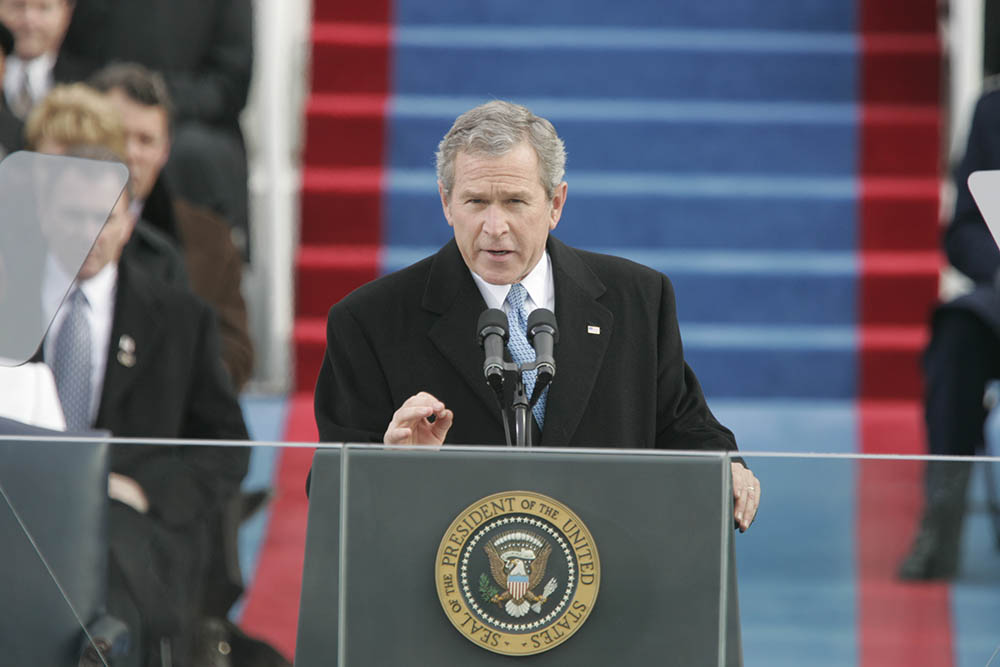
A photograph of former president George W. Bush.

Fictionalized portrayals of George W. Bush, the 43rd President of the United States, have become common since his inauguration on January 20, 2001. Many popular TV shows, magazines, books, and comics have portrayed or satirized him.

Several comedians and comic actors were known for impressions of Bush during his presidency, including Will Ferrell and Will Forte (both originally on Saturday Night Live), Jon Culshaw, Frank Caliendo, James Adomian and Jon Stewart. Impressionist Steve Bridges had a notably involved impression that included facial prosthetics to achieve similarity to Bush; he impersonated Bush in a variety of settings, including once alongside the real President Bush at the 2006 White House Correspondents' Association dinner. Actor Timothy Bottoms portrayed Bush fictionally multiple times during the Bush presidency: in the Comedy Central sitcom That's My Bush!, as a cameo in the family film The Crocodile Hunter: Collision Course, and in a serious role in the telefilm DC 9/11 (2003).

Bush was the target of satire for most of his presidency. Most fictional depictions of the President in popular media tend to emphasize his drawl and tendency to use incorrect grammar and malapropisms in speeches, as well as his sometimes awkward hand and facial gestures. Bush is often depicted in caricatures with a large nose and ears, and small eyes, giving him a somewhat chimpanzee-like appearance. This is exemplified in a Fruit of the Loom shirt design in which he is compared to the children's book character Curious George. He is also sometimes drawn in political cartoons as being short in stature.

== Film ==
=== W. ===
Bush was portrayed by Josh Brolin in W., a biographical film by Oliver Stone. The film is similar in format to Nixon, another film by Stone, covering Bush's life from his early childhood and college years, to his early political career and struggles with alcoholism, to his 2003 invasion of Iraq. W. was released on October 17, 2008, and is the first time a major motion picture has been made about a U.S. President while he was still in office.

=== Dasavathaaram ===
Dasavathaaram (2008) is an Indian film that stars popular Indian actor and filmmaker Kamal Haasan. He dons ten different roles in this film and one of those is the portrayal of George W. Bush.

=== My Name Is Khan ===
In the 2010 Indian film My Name Is Khan, Bush is a seen character who refuses to meet with Khan and accept that the protagonist is not a terrorist.

=== Death of a President ===
Bush is the target of assassination in Chicago, Illinois in this fictional tale during his presidency. Death of a President mirrors similar details surrounding the assassination attempt on Ronald Reagan during the early 1980s. Facing broad unpopular support for the 2003 invasion of Iraq, he becomes the target of an assassin with a political agenda.

=== Harold and Kumar Escape from Guantanamo Bay ===
In Harold & Kumar Escape from Guantanamo Bay, the 2008 sequel to Harold & Kumar Go to White Castle, Bush is portrayed by James Adomian in a scene where he smokes cocaine-laced marijuana with the title characters. He pardons the duo.

=== The Crocodile Hunter: Collision Course ===
The 2002 action-comedy film The Crocodile Hunter: Collision Course featured a cameo by Timothy Bottoms as President Bush.

=== DC 9/11: Time of Crisis ===
In 2004, Showtime broadcast a made-for-television movie titled DC 9/11: Time of Crisis re-enacting the September 11, 2001 attacks from the point of view of President Bush. The movie was a drama, and reviewers stated that its portrayal of George W. Bush, again by Bottoms, was generally in a positive light.

=== The Master of Disguise ===
In the film The Master of Disguise, the main character (played by Dana Carvey) dresses up as Bush and comments "Folks around here call me W."

=== Scary Movie 4 ===
In Scary Movie 4, the President of the United States is reading a children's book in a classroom, similar to George W. Bush's reading of The Pet Goat. When he is told the nation is under the attack (similar to Bush during the September 11 attacks) of alien "triPods" he replies: "Right now I want to hear what happened to the duckling" (in a spoof of Bush's reaction to the attacks).

=== Transformers ===
In the 2007 Transformers film, the president is not stated to be Bush but heavily implied to be him. However, in the direct sequel Transformers: Revenge of the Fallen, the reference to the actual President, Barack Obama, as well as brief glimpses of Bush in a news broadcast suggests that the president shown in the original is in fact, President Bush. He is shown lying in bed (with his face obscured by his feet from the camera's point of view) saying to one of the flight attendants (with a Bush-like voice, a heavy southern accent and Bush-style laughter), "Hey, could you wrangle me up some Ding Dongs darling?” The Secretary of Defense, played by Jon Voight, has him guarded in a bunker for his protection during the rest of the film.

=== Postal ===
In the comedy movie Postal, Bush is portrayed by Brent Mendenhall.

=== Lange Flate Ballær II ===
In the 2008 Norwegian comedy sequel Lange Flate Ballær 2, after the main characters (Petter, Øyvind, Edgar, Karsten, Kai and Freddy) have prevented an American nuclear submarine from exploding and thus save the world, Bush (played by Steve Bridges) pays them a visit at their garage in Fredrikstad, Norway.

=== Megumi ===
George W. Bush appears briefly in a still animated frame of the anime version of Megumi.

=== American Made ===
Connor Trinneer plays a young George Bush in the 2017 film American Made.

=== Vice ===
Sam Rockwell plays George W. Bush in the 2018 film Vice, for which he received Best Supporting Actor nominations for the Academy Award, BAFTA Award, SAG Award and Golden Globe.

=== Malesh Ehna Benetbahdel ===
Bush was portrayed by Brent Mendenhall in Malesh Ehna Benetbahdel, a 2005 Egyptian film. Bush appliers as the president of the United States, who wants Karmouti (Ahmad Adam) to falsely admit of doing terrorist attacks and dealing with weapons of mass destruction for Russia.

== Animated television ==
=== 2DTV ===
2DTV (a UK satire cartoon) regularly portrayed George W. Bush as a childish simpleton who would often make hazardous decisions while in the Oval Office. The character would not listen to advice from his advisor, the General unless he put a sock on his hand and humoured Bush like a child. These segments were extremely popular in the United Kingdom and highlighted Bush's unpopularity in the country.

In early 2003, an advertisement for the video compilation The Best of 2DTV was prevented from airing in the UK. The advertisement involved Bush taking the compilation cassette out of its case and putting it in a toaster. It was banned because the British advertising watchdog stated that advertisements for products cannot appear to be endorsed by someone without their permission – in this case George W. Bush. This decision was later overturned (due to it being legitimate satire) and the commercial was shown unedited. The makers later said that this generated more publicity than the actual advertisement could ever have produced.

The makers of 2DTV also made another short Bush sketch, in which he writes a letter, resenting his portrayal in the media as a moron. He then places the letter in a toaster.

=== Family Guy and American Dad! ===
On Family Guy, Bush has been shown in multiple episodes, performing a variety of comically childish and often inept antics, such as showing up late for duty in the Vietnam War in the episode "PTV" and hiding in his Texas treehouse to avoid news of Hurricane Katrina in "The Fat Guy Strangler". In "Don't Make Me Over", Peter Griffin is chosen to perform for as a clown for Bush at the White House, causing the latter to laugh childishly until he knocks over a snow globe, causing him to cry equally childishly. In "Saving Private Brian", Stewie Griffin enlists himself and Brian Griffin to the US Army, and both are sent to fight in Iraq. They are trying to be discharged when all of a sudden, "democracy kicks in" exactly as Bush predicted, allowing them to go home. Stewie expresses his interest in knowing who is the genius behind that war plan as the episode cuts to a scene of Bush pushing a Slinky down a set of stairs in the White House. After failing his first attempt to push the toy, Bush's second attempt is successful as he exclaim "Laura... Laura!".

In the episode "Back to the Pilot", Brian Griffin tells his past self about the 9/11 terrorist attacks in an effort to become memorialized as a national hero, though this backfires: leading to a Civil War in which Bush takes control of the south. In a press conference announcing the conflict, Bush asks for somebody to procure a "clown suitcase" for him, claiming that he is intrigued by its potential contents.

The most recent appearance of Bush on Family Guy was on the episode "Excellence in Broadcasting", in which Bush runs into the room childishly and jumps into Rush Limbaugh's arms while saying many childish things. Limbaugh then proceeds to give him a lollipop and he runs off. Bush has been cited as the inspiration for the adult animated series American Dad! When asked what first sparked the idea for American Dad! Seth MacFarlane answered, "It was right after the [2000] election, and me and co-creator Matt Weitzman was so frustrated with the Bush administration that we would just spend days bitching and complaining, and we figured we should channel this into something creative and hopefully profitable". The series has even had an episode titled "Bush Comes to Dinner" in which then-President Bush appears, presented as a buffoon.

=== King of the Hill ===
In the King of the Hill episode "The Perils of Polling", which aired shortly before the 2000 election, Hank Hill meets then-Governor Bush of Texas, only to be deeply disappointed by his limp handshake. As a result, Hank plans to boycott the polls, but in the end, changes his mind and decides to vote, considering voting to be his duty as an American.

=== Lil' Bush ===
Lil' Bush is an animated political satire/sitcom from creator Donick Cary. It debuted on Comedy Central on June 13, 2007. Instead of portraying George W. Bush as the current president, Lil' Bush is shown as the son of President George H. W. Bush, portrayed as the current president. Lil' Bush and his friends (Lil' Cheney, Lil' Condi, etc.) all attend an elementary school with other current political figures.

=== Robot Chicken ===
George W. Bush was portrayed on the Star Wars special of the stop-motion animation show Robot Chicken aired on Adult Swim. In the short sketch, an action figure version of the president was shown as dreaming that he had Jedi powers, as well as fighting former U.S. president Abraham Lincoln with a lightsaber and chopping off his daughter Jenna's finger in a parody of famous scenes from Star Wars. He uses Jedi mind tricks to get a parking place and get his wife Laura to have a menage a trois with him and Condoleezza Rice.

In another episode, "Tapping a Hero", Bush comes into possession of a mogwai and proceeds to do everything he was instructed not to do with it (i.e. get it wet, feed it past midnight, etc.). Eventually, one of the clones gets a hold of the nuclear launch codes and destroys the world.

Bush is voiced by Seth Green.

=== The Simpsons ===
During his term as governor of Texas, Bush was satirized on The Simpsons episode "Two Bad Neighbors" when his parents George and Barbara move in across the street from the Simpsons and Homer and Bart Simpson trick the elder Bush into answering the door with two cardboard cutouts of George W. and Jeb Bush. According to the show's creators, they were unaware that George and Barbara Bush's eldest son was named George and said that the term "George Bush, Jr." was intended to be a joke about the stupidity of Homer and Bart's plans. In a reference to the same episode in Season 17's "Regarding Margie", Homer has a photo album, stating "Here's me beating up former President Bush, here's me beating up current President Bush, and here's me showing a sack of apples who's boss". In "The Father, The Son, and the Holy Guest Star", while Bush isn't directly referenced by name, Homer makes a passing reference to a "Commander Cuckoo Bananas" causing a lot of American military quagmires, which serves as a thinly veiled metaphor for Bush.

=== South Park ===
President Bush and Condoleezza Rice appear in South Park.

South Park displayed the character of George W. Bush in multiple episodes. He is first seen briefly in the episode "Super Best Friends" standing alongside animated portrayals of the cast of That's My Bush! In "A Ladder to Heaven", he tries to wage a war against Saddam Hussein, who, in South Park's continuity, is a spirit kicked out of Hell and dwelling unwillingly in Heaven. Bush recollects the history of Saddam's character in the show's continuity to the United Nations. Bush later appears, albeit briefly, in "South Park is Gay!", where the cast from Queer Eye for the Straight Guy give him a makeover as part of an evil plan for world domination.

Bush is later shown with an updated look in the two-part episode "Cartoon Wars Part I" and "Cartoon Wars Part II", where he attempts to stop a cartoon depicting the Prophet Muhammad from airing for fear of terrorist retaliation. When he fails and the show is broadcast, Ayman al-Zawahiri makes a "retaliation" cartoon that depicts him and other Americans defecating on Jesus and the American flag.

Bush is also seen in "Mystery of the Urinal Deuce", which deals with 9/11 conspiracy theories. In this episode, he reveals to Stan and Kyle Broflovski that all the theories are true, and that he and his administration carried out the 9/11 attacks to invade Iraq. By the end of the episode, however, it is revealed that this was a lie and that all the conspiracy theories were actually made up by his administration so that the government would seem all-powerful. He also had a final, brief cameo in "The Snuke", which deals with an attempted terrorist attack by a bomb planted in Hillary Clinton's vagina.

He was at one point set to appear in "About Last Night..." and was to take the blame for the Hope Diamond heist (performed by Barack Obama and John McCain in the episode) in a spoof of Ocean's Eleven. The show's creators, Trey Parker and Matt Stone, cut the scene because they considered Bush a "dead man walking". Although the White House and even the Oval Office are seen in the episode, Bush is missing and never referred to.

=== Time Squad ===
Bush made an appearance in an episode of the 2001–2003 Cartoon Network animated series Time Squad, trying to make the biggest ball of twine in the world to "bring America together". Bush's father George H. W. Bush made an appearance as well.

=== Sons of Butcher ===
In the Canadian animated series Sons of Butcher, in the episode "Payin' the Bills", Bush is seen playing video games with two other politicians in his office. When told of an army forming in the fictional country of Afghanaraq (where Sol was at the time), he decided to launch a missile there, but pushes the wrong button, thereby launching a missile to Aljania by mistake (after pressing the button, he said "I love doing that"). When he realizes what he did, he simply laughs and says "Oops" before hitting the right button, launching a missile in the right country.

== Live action television ==
=== Kopspijkers ===
In Kopspijkers, a Dutch public television talk show, Thomas van Luyn as President Bush was set before a fictional press and sang an edited version of the song "Always on My Mind".

=== Late Late Show with Craig Ferguson ===
Comedian James Adomian has appeared frequently as George W. Bush on The Late Late Show with Craig Ferguson since Ferguson began hosting the program in 2005. Sketches often include Bush (Adomian) being interviewed by Craig Ferguson or appearing next to Ferguson at a mock press conference.

=== Dead Ringers ===
On the BBC British comedy impression show Dead Ringers, Bush was a recurring target for satire, being portrayed by Jon Culshaw. The parodies of Bush put emphasis and exaggeration on the concept of Bushisms, general ignorance, and lampooned malapropisms, such as "My fellow Abbytitmuses, this is your Sterident speaking..." and "I want Osama Bin Laden captured alive or dead or both!".

=== MADtv ===
For several seasons, Bush was portrayed by Frank Caliendo on MADtv. Usually, he's portrayed as a simple-minded fool. Since Caliendo left the show in 2006, Bush was played by James Adomian in voiceover parts. Bush was also played by Christian Duguay during the show's sixth season. During Will Sasso's five-year tenure with the show, he also played George W. Bush.

=== Saturday Night Live ===
During the 2000 campaign and first year of his presidency, Bush was portrayed on Saturday Night Live by Will Ferrell, who emphasized the innocent, childlike aspect of the character (in one skit Jeb Bush (played by Val Kilmer) gives George a toy to play with so he can talk with Al Gore). Ferrell played Bush from 1999 to 2002 until he departed from the show. Cast member Chris Parnell took over the portrayal of Bush when Ferrell left. Since Parnell's impression was not as popular as Ferrell's, cast member Darrell Hammond was selected to replace him as Bush in late 2003. Hammond made only two appearances as Bush and was replaced by cast member Will Forte in 2004. Forte chose to portray Bush as less innocent and more nervous. Although Forte's portrayal was far more popular than Parnell's or Hammond's, it was never as well-received as Ferrell's. A newer cast member Jason Sudeikis took over the role from Forte in 2006 for unexplained reasons. Will Ferrell reprised the role when he hosted.

=== That's My Bush! ===
That's My Bush! was a live-action political satire/sitcom from South Park creators Trey Parker and Matt Stone. It aired on Comedy Central in its first run from April through June 2001. Despite being about the fictional exploits of the president, it instead mostly satirized the 1970s, 1980s, and workplace sitcoms; indeed, it was originally pitched as being about Al Gore, implying that jokes about George Bush were never really meant to be the show's main feature. The show often portrayed Bush dealing with both a sitcom-type situation and a political one at the same time, such as having a romantic dinner with Laura the same night as a major dinner with both sides of the abortion debate. George W. Bush was generally portrayed as being foolish (as were most of the characters) yet essentially honest in his efforts. The show was eventually canceled due to high production costs and insufficient ratings.

=== World Wrestling Entertainment ===
On the December 18 edition of WWE Raw, a George W. Bush impersonator entered the ring in aid of Cryme Tyme, an African American tag team. Though Cryme Tyme were faces in the WWE, meaning they are supposed to be cheered, Bush himself was booed by the live crowd. The impersonation sketch they performed referenced multiple African American celebrities, including Kanye West as well as Bush Administration officials Colin Powell and Condoleezza Rice. At one point, the Bush character confused George Jefferson for Thomas Jefferson, claiming that the Jeffersons character had written the Declaration of Independence. He then began to say "You know he's my nigga", before being interrupted by Cryme Tyme in the middle of the last word. At the end of the sketch, Cryme Tyme stole Bush's wallet, and in return, Bush started to yell "Arrest those niggers", before again catching himself in mid-word and following up with "Arrest those people". Cryme Tyme was not apprehended, however. Bush then turned at the end of the entrance ramp before exiting the arena and flipped off the crowd.

=== Mr. Deity ===
In the Mr. Deity episode "Mr. Deity and the Intel", George W. Bush is portrayed by Louie Sadd, where Mr. Deity (God) is discussing the 2003 War on Terror with Bush, but Deity doesn't understand him that well and does not know what would happen with the war.

=== Off-the-cuff impersonations ===
Often, when a story involving George W. Bush is shown on The Daily Show, host Jon Stewart hunches his shoulders, squints his eyes, talks in a voice similar to Bush's, and uses strange hand gestures, occasionally accompanied by Beavis and Butt-Head-style laughing.

== Online media ==
During the early 2000's, Bush was often portrayed in various flash games and animations on websites like Miniclip and Newgrounds. The depictions of Bush ranged wildly: for example in Miniclip's "George Bush Shootout" players assume control of the president whilst gunning down enemies attempting to destroy the White House, while in contrast Bush was depicted in various satirical animations and games on Newgrounds which generally mocked him.

== Comics ==
=== Doonesbury ===
First appearance of Imperial Bush in Doonesbury

In the political comic Doonesbury, President George W. Bush was symbolized by a Stetson hat atop a giant asterisk. The hat referred to his time spent as Governor of Texas; Doonesbury artist Garry Trudeau refers to Bush as being "all hat and no cattle". The asterisk was intended to represent the special circumstances surrounding Bush's election, it being the typical symbol to mark footnoted special circumstances in any standard record book.

Later, President Bush's symbol was changed to a Roman military helmet (again, atop an asterisk) representing imperialism. Towards the end of his first term, the helmet became battered, with the gilt work starting to come off and with clumps of bristles missing from the top, but on September 2, 2006, he fantasized about himself wearing a crown.

Starting on November 2, 2010, Roland Hedley began interviewing President Bush for Fox News. The interview was in anticipation of the release of Bush's memoir, Decision Points, which was due to be released on November 9. At that point, the asterisk remained but nearly all of the Roman helmet was gone. All that remained was the crest holder (sans crest) which was so badly battered that it resembled an all-in-one assembly of Allen wrenches.

=== Baki (manga) ===
George Bush was Kidnapped and subsequently drop kicked out of a window.

=== If... ===
In his political comic strip If..., English cartoonist Steve Bell depicts President Bush as a chimpanzee. Bell first drew Bush as a chimpanzee in a cartoon on his inauguration, as a reference to the 1951 film Bedtime for Bonzo starring Ronald Reagan. Bell later explained that he originally did not intend to continue depicting Bush as a chimpanzee, but eventually come to find the portrayal very fitting after studying Bush's body language.

=== Marvel Comics ===
==== Ultimate X-Men ====
Bush was also portrayed in Ultimate X-Men. He becomes an ally to the X-Men after they rescue his daughter from Magneto's Brotherhood of Mutants. After Magneto attacked America, he was stripped naked by him and forced to lick his boots clean while on live TV. Afterward, Magneto attempted to drop a car on him but was stopped when the X-Men intervened. The car's license plate read "DUBYA".

==== The Ultimates ====
Bush appears in a cameo during the first volume of Marvel's The Ultimates, a satirical take on the Avengers which reimagines its heroes in a post-9/11 context. While no commentary was made on his policies, the President did seem flustered as he spoke to the then-recently awoken Captain America. He appears again in The Ultimates 2 in which he is captured by an anti-American supervillain group. Seeing how having the Ultimates working with the United States government "policing" the world would produce similar results to their battle against the Liberators, the team decided to leave the government behind and continue to work as an independent team instead.

== See also ==
- List of presidents of the United States
- Will Ferrell
- James Adomian
- Will Forte
- Frank Caliendo
- Steve Bridges
- Strategery
