= Andrea Jenna =

Canadian television host, actress, and spokesperson

- Known for: Television host
- Website: http://www.andreajenna.com

Andrea Jenna is a Canadian television host, actress and spokesperson. She currently hosts the programming block Cant Miss Thursdays on Teletoon and Yahoo! Canada's food series The Perfect Bite.

== Early life and education ==
Andrea is from Markham, Ontario, Canada. She studied Media, Information & Technoculture at Western University, and specialized in Broadcast Journalism at Fanshawe College.

== Career ==
=== Teletoon ===
In 2011 Andrea was hired to co-host a one-day broadcast event on Teletoon for the launch of Cant Miss Thursdays new programming lineup. In the fall of 2012, she became the first-ever host of Teletoon's Cant Miss Thursdays block for kids every Thursday from 6 p.m. to 8 p.m. ET/PT.

=== The Grammys ===
Scouted over Twitter by the social media team for The Recording Academy, she was chosen to co-host the behind the scenes live webcast during The GRAMMY Nominations Concert Live!- Countdown to Music's Biggest Night on November 30, 2011. Coverage included reactions and interviews with nominees of the 54th Annual Grammy Awards. Some notable interviews included: LL Cool J, Bruno Mars, Katy Perry, Jason Aldean, and The Civil Wars

=== Sportsnet ===
In August 2012 Andrea joined the sports show Cricket Central covering the ICC World T20 on Sportsnet as host of The FanZone.

=== Yahoo Canada ===
In November 2012 Andrea became host of Yahoo Canada's original food series The Perfect Bite. In 2013, The Perfect Bite was nominated for a Digi Award for Best in Web Series Non-Fiction.

On August 15, 2013, Andrea hosted Yahoo! Canada's live stream of The Mortal Instruments, City of Bones Toronto Premiere. Interviews on the red carpet included: Lily Collins, Jamie Campbell Bower, Robert Sheehan, Kevin Zegers, Harald Zwart.
