= John R. Graham (composer) =

American film composer

- Birth name: John Roderick Graham
- Born: Charlottesville, Virginia
- Genres: Film score, game score
- Occupation(s): composer and conductor
- Instrument(s): Piano, Keyboard, Electronic composition, Voice
- Years active: 1993–present
- Website: johngrahammusic.com

John Roderick Graham is an American film composer. He is best known for his film scores to Kingsglaive: Final Fantasy XV and the score for the taiga dramas Kirin ga Kuru and "Berabou" or, in English, "Unbound." He is also known for the scores to The Royal Treatment (film), Bitch Slap, Lange Flate Ballær 2, and American Strays. He won first prize for Best Original Score for his music in "Alleged" at the Michigan Film Festival, and won Best Soundtrack Album for his score for Long Flat Balls II at the Just Plain Folks awards.

== Life and career ==
Graham was born in Charlottesville, Virginia. During his youth he studied singing and orchestral composition at Charterhouse School in Surrey, England. Graham began his career singing and playing in bands, while studying traditional orchestral music. After Charterhouse, Graham pursued his studies at Williams College, Stanford University, and UCLA, focusing more and more on film music over time.

Graham's first film score was written for Full Contact, a film directed by Rick Jacobson, whom he has also worked with at other times, including, most recently, on "The Royal Treatment (film)". He has also worked with James Brolin on "The Royal Hearts," My Brother's War, and Pensacola: Wings of Gold.

Graham also works with Immediate Music, and his music has been featured in the trailers for Avatar, Edge of Darkness, "Cloudy With a Chance of Meatballs," "Night at the Museum 2: Battle of the Smithsonian" (Fox), "The Curious Case of Benjamin Button (film)" The Mummy: Tomb of the Dragon Emperor, and others.

On March 8, 2019, NHK announced that Graham would be the composer for the 59th taiga drama Kirin ga Kuru. NHK also engaged Graham to score the 2025 Taiga Drama, "Berabou" or, in English, "Unbound." He is the first American composer to score a taiga drama since they began in 1963.

== See also ==
- Harald Zwart
- James Brolin
