= Public image of George Bush =

Public image of George Bush may refer to:

- Public image of George W. Bush
- Public image of George H. W. Bush
