= Trust Me (2010 film) =

2010 film by Johan Kling

- Theatrical release poster
- Swedish: Puss
- Directed by: Johan Kling
- Written by: Johan Kling
- Produced by: Fredrik Heinig; Mathilde Dedye
- Starring: Alexander Skarsgård; Susanne Thorson; Gustaf Skarsgård; Philomène Grandin; Michael Segerström; Vera Vitali; Lotti Törnros; Moa Gammel; Lars Bringås; Michelle Meadows; Richard Ulfsäter; Peter Carlberg; Gitte Witt
- Cinematography: Jakob Ihre
- Edited by: Malin Lindström
- Music by: Georg Riedel
- Production company: St Paul Film
- Distributed by: Nordisk Film
- Release date: 20 August 2010 (Sweden)
- Running time: 105 minutes
- Countries: Sweden; Norway
- Language: Swedish
- Budget: 21.5 million SEK

Trust Me (Swedish: Puss, lit. 'Kiss') is a 2010 comedy drama film written and directed by Johan Kling, starring an ensemble cast including Alexander Skarsgård, Susanne Thorson, Gustaf Skarsgård and Philomène Grandin. The film focuses on a group of young people running a small theater in Stockholm.

== Cast ==
- Alexander Skarsgård as Alex
- Susanne Thorson as Katja
- Gustaf Skarsgård as Jon
- Moa Gammel as Mia
- Richard Ulfsäter as Andreas
- Philomène Grandin as Jessica
- Erica Carlson as Anna
- Peter Carlberg as the homeless
- Michelle Meadows as Michy
- Michael Segerström as Pikner
- Jessica Zandén as Jessica's mother
- Vera Vitali as Natalie
- Gitte Witt as the darkness
- Victor von Schirach as cashier
- Lotti Törnros as Lotten
- Lars Bringås as Sebastian

== Production ==
Trust Me was produced by St Paul Film in co-production with Nordisk Film, Sveriges Television, Canal+ and the Norwegian company Spillefilmkompaniet 4½. It received seven million SEK from the Swedish Film Institute, plus support from Nordisk Film- & TV Fond and local funds in Stockholm and Gotland. The total budget was 21.5 million SEK. Filming started in September 2008, but after only ten days Johan Kling experienced a burnout and the production was postponed. "I felt like Lord Jim who left his own ship", the director later commented. Filming resumed the following August and principal shooting ended in October 2009.
