= Derangement syndrome =

Derangement syndrome is a term used in 21st century politics, usually attached to a particular political figure, and used to refer to how they inspire irrational behavior in others. Examples may include:

- Bush derangement syndrome
- Trump derangement syndrome
- Biden derangement syndrome
