= Johan Kling =

Swedish film director and writer (born 1962)

- Born: Carl-David Johan Natt och Dag; 7 August 1962 (age 64); Stockholm, Sweden
- Occupations: Director; screenwriter; novelist

Johan Kling (born Carl-David Johan Natt och Dag, 7 August 1962) is a Swedish film director, screenwriter, and novelist. His debut movie, Darling (2007), received numerous nominations and won several awards.

== Career ==
Kling started his career in the early 1980s as a musician in the pop group Ratata and went on to make television commercials and direct TV shows.

=== Film ===
Darling

His debut feature, Darling, which he wrote and directed, was released in 2007. The movie is based on a short film, Jag, made a few years earlier. Darling is "a dark comedy about morals and manners in Stockholm" and stars Michael Segerström and Michelle Meadows. The latter's performance was praised highly by Variety, which also gave acclaim to Kling's "smooth" direction.

After winning the Best Film award, the "Nordic Film Prize", at the 2007 Gothenburg Film Festival, Darling garnered almost every possible prize in Sweden. At the 2007 Guldbagge Awards, Darling was nominated in six categories and won the awards for Best Male Actor and Best Cinematography. The film was also awarded for Best Film of 2007 by the Swedish Association of Film Critics.

Darling had its international premiere at the San Sebastián International Film Festival in Spain, where it competed in the New Directors section.

Trust Me

Kling announced in 2008 that his next film would be Trust Me, again starring Meadows and Segerström.

== Writing ==
Kling's first novel, Människor helt utan betydelse, was published in 2009, and tells the story of a PR worker and his girlfriend. The Swedish newspaper Svenska Dagbladet thought it one of the more notable Swedish books of the year.

Kling has since published the novels Glasmannen (2014), Lycka (2019), and Repris (2023).

== Filmography ==
- Darling (2007)
- Trust Me (2010)

== Bibliography ==
- Kling, Johan (2009). Människor helt utan betydelse. Norstedts. ISBN 978-91-1-301961-1.
- Kling, Johan (2014). Glasmannen. Norstedts. ISBN 978-91-1-305445-2.
- Kling, Johan (2019). Lycka. Natur och Kultur. ISBN 978-91-2-716158-0.
- Kling, Johan (2023). Repris. Natur och Kultur. ISBN 978-91-2-718316-2.
