= Darling (2007 Swedish film) =

2007 film by Johan Kling

- Theatrical release poster
- Directed by: Johan Kling
- Written by: Johan Kling
- Produced by: Fredrik Heinig
- Starring: Michelle Meadows; Michael Segerström
- Cinematography: Geir Hartly Andreassen
- Edited by: Markus Lindkvist
- Music by: Ulf Engström; Robert Östlund
- Production companies: Spader Knekt; Svensk Filmindustri; Sveriges Television; Station to Station
- Distributed by: Svensk Filmindustri
- Release dates: 28 January 2007 (Gothenburg); 9 February 2007 (Sweden)
- Running time: 94 minutes
- Country: Sweden
- Language: Swedish

Darling is a 2007 Swedish drama film written and directed by Johan Kling, about an irresponsible young woman in central Stockholm who befriends an older man. It stars Michelle Meadows and Michael Segerström. The film was generally well received by critics.

== Synopsis ==
Eva is a twenty-something woman from an upper-class family, with divorced parents. She lives a carefree, self-indulgent life in an upscale part of Stockholm. She works as an assistant in a clothing store, goes out with the handsome Micke, and is seen in all the right places. Emotionally, she is running on empty. After a casual one-night-stand, she finds herself ignored by her friends, and on top of this, she loses her job, which leads to financial struggles, since her mother wants her to make do on her own.

Electrical engineer Bernard is divorced since a year ago, alone in a house that is too big and too expensive. Aged 61, he is desperate for money and goes on a string of hopeless job interviews, taking whatever short-term jobs he can get. Despite various adversities, he remains a sympathetic, optimistic, and gentle man, albeit too easily bossed around. After losing a door-to-door sales job, he is employed at a McDonald's. A month later, Eva starts working at the same restaurant, set on only remaining for a few weeks to qualify for her welfare payments. The two start talking and find that they get along well, recognizing a mutual kinship.

== Cast ==
- Michelle Meadows as Eva
- Michael Segerström as Bernard
- Richard Ulfsäter as Micke
- Michael Lindgren as Nico
- Marko Ivkovich as McDonald's chef
- Erica Silfverhielm as Martina
- Henrik Lundström as Mickes friend
- Tanja Lorentzon as Maja

== Awards and nominations ==
The film was awarded the Nordic Film Prize at the Gothenburg Film Festival as well as Best Actor (Michael Segerström) and Best Cinematography at the 43rd Guldbagge Awards. It was also nominated for Best Film, Best Director, Best Actress (Michelle Meadows), and Best Screenplay.
