= Aching Heart =

- DVD Cover
- Swedish: Det svider i hjärtat
- Directed by: Oscar Hedin
- Written by: Oscar Hedin
- Distributed by: Laika Films & Television
- Release date: 19 October 2007
- Running time: 75 minutes
- Country: Sweden
- Language: Swedish

Aching Heart (Swedish: Det svider i hjärtat; lit. 'It hurts in the heart') is a Swedish documentary film about the world of young European Muslims who dedicate themselves to jihad, or holy war. It was nominated by the Swedish Film Institute for the 43rd Guldbagge Awards in the category of Best Documentary Feature.

== Plot ==
The film includes the story of "two young Swedes with immigrant backgrounds - one from Ostermalm, one of Stockholm's poshest neighborhoods, and one from Kvanum, a tiny town in central Sweden - who left their homes in the 1990s to seek martyrdom in the wars of Chechnya and Bosnia and Herzegovina."

== Support ==
Oscar Hedin, the director and writer of the film received support from academics who have studied the phenomenon of Islamic radicalisation.

== See also ==
- Islamic terrorism

=== Related documentaries ===
- Al-Qaeda's New Front
- Islam: What the West Needs to Know
