= Geir Hartly Andreassen =

Norwegian cinematographer (born 1971)

- Born: Geir Hartly Andreassen; 22 November 1971 (age 53); Bergen, Norway
- Awards: Guldbagge Award for Best Cinematography 2007 Darling; George Eastman Award; 2007 Darling; Dolby Laboratories Sound Award; 1992 A modest psychological blowout Amandus Award 1989 Verdens herlighet

Geir Hartly Andreassen, FSF (born 22 November 1971) is a Norwegian cinematographer based in Stockholm, Sweden. His work includes The Mortal Instruments: City of Bones (2013), Kon Tiki (2012), Max Manus (2008), Lange Flate Ballær I and II (2006, 2008), and Darling (2007).

Andreassen has won several awards, including the Amanda Award (2009) for best cinematography for Max Manus, Guldbagge Award in (2007) for best cinematography for Darling.

== Filmography ==
=== Features ===
- The Mortal Instruments: City of Bones (2013)
- Kon-Tiki (2012)
- Max Manus (2008)
- Lange Flate Ballær 2 (2008)
- Majken (2008)
- Darling (2007)
- Babas bilar (2006)
- Lange flate ballær (2006)
- Boban hockeystjärnan (2003)
- Cuba libre (2002)
- Barnsäng (2001)
- Nöd ut (1996)

=== Shorts ===
- Innesluten (Fredrik Edfeldt) Pinguinfilm, 2004
- Boban Hockeystjärnan (Miko Lazic) Filmkreatörerna, 2003
- Cuba Libre (Kristina Humle) Filmbolaget, 2002
- Barnsäng (Fredrik Edfeldt) Pinguinfilm, 2001
- Unce Upon a Time (Miko Lazic) Filmkreatörerna, 2000
- Fly (Matias A. Jordal) Paradox, 2000 (Winner of Norway shortfilm festival)
- Nöd Ut (Geir Hansteen Jörgensen), 1996
- Monument (Kristin Seim Buflod), 1996

=== Documentary ===
- Einstein (Karin Wegsiö), 2004. Commissioned by the Nobel Museum in Stockholm

== Education ==
- Bachelor of arts, Cinematography, University College of Film (Dramatiska Institutet). Professor: Sven Nykvist, ASC, FSF
- Technician of Telecommunication, Technical school (Stavanger Tekniske Fagskole)

== Memberships ==
- The Swedish Society of Cinematographers (FSF)

== Awards ==
- Amanda Award (2009) Best cinematography for Max Manus.
- Guldbagge Award (2007) Best cinematography for Darling.
- George Eastman Award (2007)
- Dolby Laboratories Sound Award for the film A modest psychological blowout, 1992
- Amandus for best short film Verdens herlighet, 1989

== See also ==
- Max Manus
- Lange Flate Ballær
