= Post Mortem: No One Dies in Skarnes =

2021 Norwegian television series

- Promotional poster
- Norwegian: Post Mortem: ingen dør på Skarnes
- Created by: Petter Holmsen
- Directed by: Harald Zwart; Petter Holmsen
- Original language: Norwegian

Production
- Producers: Espen Horn; Kristian Strand Sinkerud
- Production company: Motion Blur

Original release
- Network: Netflix
- Release: 25 August 2021

Post Mortem: No One Dies in Skarnes (Norwegian: Post Mortem: Ingen dør på Skarnes) is a 2021 Norwegian drama television series.

== Plot ==
Live (pronounced LEE-veh) Hallangen, a nursing-home nurse in the small town of Skarnes, Innlandet, Norway, is found by police in a field and declared dead, but later awakens on the forensic table as her autopsy is starting. Live is taken to the town's hospital, where Dr. Sverre explains away her revival as her having been hypothermic in the field and her heart having slowed to imperceptible levels as a form of suspended animation. Judith, who heads the three-person police department, accepts this readily, but her sole officer, Reinert, remains suspicious. Live's brother Odd Hallangen runs the town's funeral home, together with their father, Arvid. The family, including Odd's wife, nursing-home nurse Rose, live above the business.

After Live is discharged and returns home, she finds her father acting nervous and perhaps frightened. He eventually knocks her out with chloroform and places her in a wooden coffin, which he then feeds into the oven at the nearby crematorium. Having awakened by now, a terrified Live pounds on the wooden lid until it breaks, and she barely escapes the flames. Arvid tries explaining that he had no other choice, and when he approaches her, Live shoves him away, leading to his falling onto a sharp object and being killed. A horrified Live returns home but says nothing. Police and forensics later rule Arvid's death an accident.

A mournful Odd takes over the funeral home but finds that with virtually no one having died in Skarnes in some time, the business is on the verge of bankruptcy. Bank officer Frode, while appearing sympathetic to this fifth-generation business, says the bank must soon take it and the house. Odd, hoping to turn things around, says nothing to Live and Rose. Meanwhile, Live finds herself being tortured by highly acute hearing. She also finds herself becoming unnaturally aggressive at times, and exhibiting greater-than-average strength when agitated. She also finds herself craving blood to drink. Live finds old reel-to-reel tape recordings of her mother, who also suffered from this "darkness" and blood-craving and who eventually killed herself some time ago in order to escape it. The townsfolk, however, believes that police chief Judith drove the mother to suicide after hounding her as a suspect in mysterious deaths.

The word "vampire" is never mentioned, and Live can walk in sunlight. Nonetheless, she exhibits every other sign of being a vampire. In a blackout state, she eventually feeds on Reinert, and is horrified at herself upon awakening. Nonetheless, she wraps up his corpse to dispose of it. While she is in the process of doing so, Reinert comes back to "life" and she eventually subdues him in a muddy field. She brings him to the hospital, but amid police suspicion decides to eliminate Reinert by smothering him with a pillow. She again kills him, but then Dr. Sverre suddenly arrives, and though catching her in the act seems strangely unconcerned. He reveals he knows what Live and now Reinert are, and says he knew this of Live's mother as well. He was using the mother's blood to try to synthesize both an antidote and also a formula for rapid healing and perhaps even life rejuvenation. He tells police that Reinert had had a psychotic episode but otherwise will be fine.

Dr. Sverre allows Reinert to go home, but tells Live that Reinert must be burned, the only sure way to kill him, before he does something terrible. Live insists there must be another way, and takes blood to Reinert's house in order to keep him satiated. But Reinert that night tries to feed on a child, and only Dr. Sverre's intervention with a tranquilizer stops him. Sverre convinces Live that burning Reinert is a necessity, and she reluctantly agrees to help him do so at an abandoned barn in the field where she had been found. While there, however, Sverre tricks Live and traps her inside the barn as well, setting it on fire and revealing to Live that he had been the one to tranquilize her and leave her in the field (making it his fault her vampirism manifested). Live and Reinert escape, however, and Reinert in a blood frenzy kills Sverre.

Live and Reinert stage Sverre's body at his house, making it seem as though the overworked 60-something had died of natural causes. When Odd goes to pick up the body, he prods Reinert over whether the death was suspicious and needs an autopsy, the budget-breaking cost of which is always on the police department's mind. Needing the business, Odd does not dispute Reinert's characterization of it as a natural death. He later has second thoughts and tells the police there should be an autopsy. Live begs Odd to tell the police he made a mistake and there's nothing suspicious, and reveals that Sverre was the one who'd attacked her in the field. But she lies and says she had killed him, prompting Odd's protective instinct. Judith, her suspicions by now aroused by the autopsy request and other things, detains Live for Sverre's murder. But she ultimately can produce no hard evidence since Odd pretended that, not knowing any better, he'd already embalmed Sverre before calling for an autopsy. The season ends with Sverre's funeral, the high price of which saves the funeral-home business, and Live and Odd driving home afterward.

== Cast ==
- Kathrine Thorborg Johansen as Live Hallangen
- Elias Holmen Sørensen as Odd Hallangen
- André Sørum as Reinert
- Kim Fairchild as Judith
- Sarah Khorami as Rose
- Terje Strømdahl as Arvid
- Øystein Røger as Dr. Sverre

== Production ==
Post Mortem was directed by Harald Zwart and Petter Holmsen. The series was produced by Motion Blur, a Norwegian production company. Espen Horn and Kristian Strand Sinkerud served as producers on the series. The series premiered on Netflix on 25 August 2021. The soundtrack contains popular Norwegian songs from the 1950s through 70s from artists including Stein Ove Berg, Elisabeth Granneman, Kurt Foss, and Reidar Bøe.

It runs as six 45-minute episodes.

== Reception ==
Aftenposten's Asbjørn Slettemark said the series starts "anemic", but "wakes up from the dead and bites". Dagbladet's Marie Kleve described the series as "fun and bloody", but also "not as hilarious as it would like to be". Verdens Gang's Tor Martin Bøe rated the series with a "die throw" of four out of six.

Among American critics, Joel Keller on The Decider, which has a "stream it or skip it" catchphrase, said "stream it." He said of the first episode that while it "gets off to a bit of a slow start, knowing where the show is going makes us think that it's going to be sardonic fun instead of a gratuitous bloodbath." He like how "Aside from her new abilities and thirst for blood, [Live is] otherwise normal. She has the same interests and memories as she had before she died, but just now has to contend with dealing with these new impulses. Odd seems to be amiably clueless, but he’s a good contrast to the lonely Live."

Karina Adelgaard of Heaven of Horror, who watched all six episodes, rated it 4 out of 5 stars, and called it "truly a gem" and that "It's catchy from the opening scene and episodes tend to end on cliffhangers. Also, there's subtle humor that really drives it all home."

Roger Moore of Movie Nation, however, said, "Saying 'It's Six Feet Under meets True Blood ' is stretching things a tad. Because it's just not as interesting or engrossing or darkly funny as either." But he felt that "Johansen makes an affecting lead, trying to play cagey and cracking under the strain at the same time. And Sørensen has his moments as a guy wrestling with a funeral business that ... has only survived due to a Trump level cooking of the books and dodging of debts."
