= Kvänum =

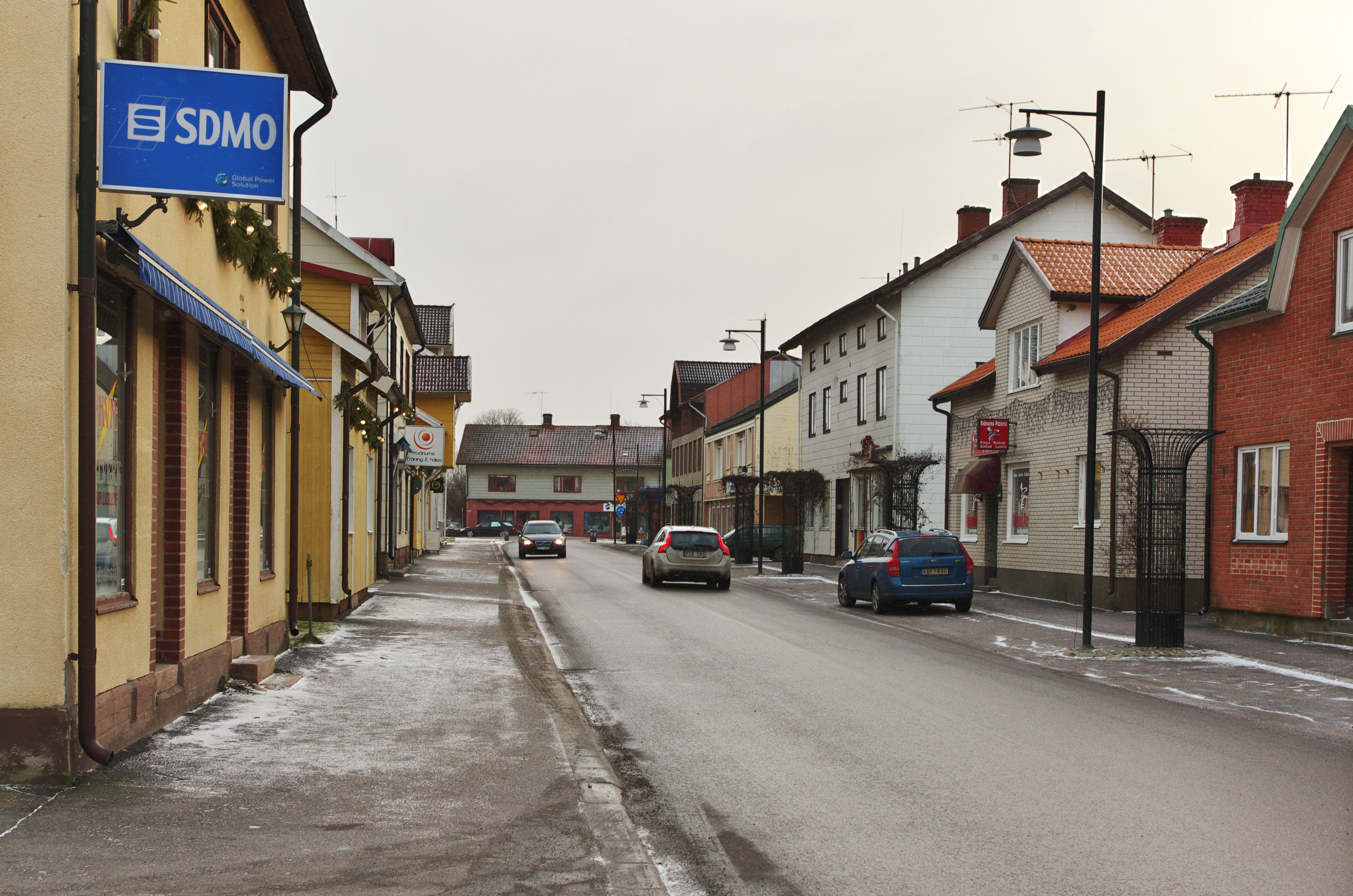
- A street in Kvänum

- Location within Västra Götaland Location within Sweden
- Coordinates: 58°18′N 13°11′E
- Country: Sweden
- Province: Västergötland
- County: Västra Götaland County
- Municipality: Vara Municipality

Area
  - Total: 1.60 km^{2} (0.62 sq mi)

Population (31 December 2010)
  - Total: 1,277
  - Density: 796/km^{2} (2,060/sq mi)
- Time zone: UTC+1 (CET)
  - Summer (DST): UTC+2 (CEST)
- Climate: Cfb

Kvänum is a locality situated in Vara Municipality, Västra Götaland County, Sweden with 1,277 inhabitants in 2010.

The town was a subject of the 2007 documentary film Aching Heart.
