= Susanne Thorson =

Swedish actress

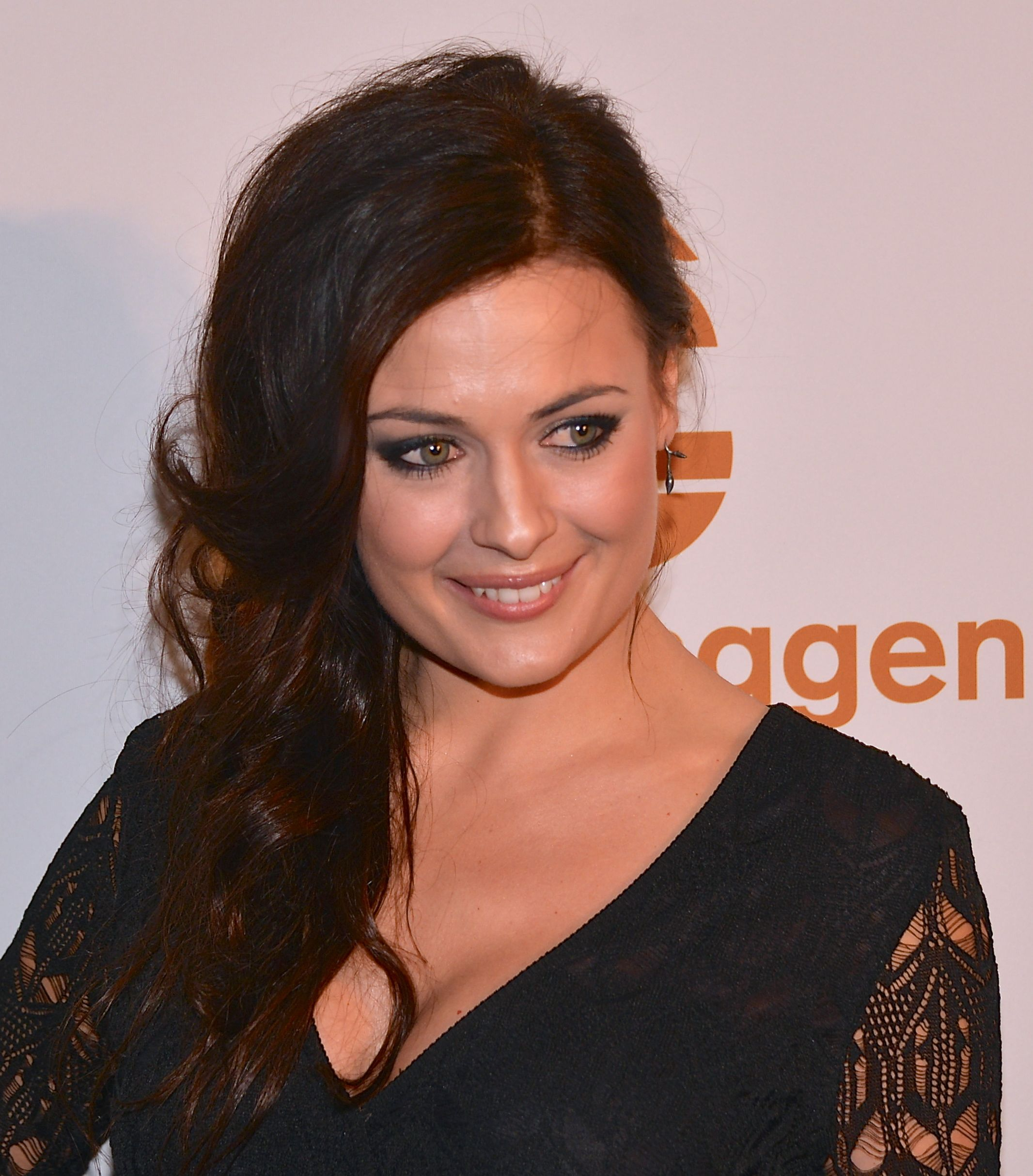
- Born: June 12, 1981 (age 43)
- Occupation: Actress

Susanne Thorson (born 12 June 1981) is a Swedish actress.

== Selected filmography ==
Year	Film	Role	Notes
2010	Trust Me	Katja	
2010	Simple Simon	Jonna	
2010	Cornelis	Administrator at Immigration Office	
2012	En gång i Phuket	Anja	
2015	Jönssonligan – Den perfekta stöten	Rocky	
