= Oljefondet (TV series) =

Norwegian comedy-drama television series

- Genre: Comedy drama
- Created by: Harald Zwart
- Starring: Håkon T. Nielsen; Evelyn Rasmussen Osazuwa; Stella Sophia Zwart
- Country of origin: Norway
- Original language: Norwegian
- No. of seasons: 1
- No. of episodes: 10

Production
- Running time: 20–30 minutes

Original release
- Network: TVNorge
- Release: 8 January 2018 – 3 February 2019

Oljefondet (English: The Oil Fund) is a Norwegian comedy-drama television series that originally aired from January 8, 2018, to February 3, 2019, on TVNorge. The series consists of one season and ten episodes. Created by Harald Zwart, the show stars Håkon T. Nielsen, Evelyn Rasmussen Osazuwa, and Stella Sophia Zwart.

== Premise ==
Oljefondet is a comical drama television series focused on the Norwegian Pension Fund, endearingly referred to as Oljefondet. This fund was established to manage the massive tax income from Norway's oil and gas sector. Its purpose is to ensure the financial stability for future pensioners and maintain the socialist principles of universal healthcare, among other things. The program revolves around a group of fictional investors responsible for allocating the fund's billions while adhering to the ethical investment guidelines set by Norwegian politicians. Navigating the intricate ethical rules within the vast, cynical landscape of global business leads to intriguing challenges. At present, the fund holds ownership of 1% of the world.

== Plot ==
While he tries to create value for its pensioners, a skilled investor for Norway's oil fund must contend with large companies, bureaucracy, and an ethics committee. The show provides an insightful look into the challenges and complexities of ethical investing, while also incorporating elements of comedy and drama that captivate audiences.
