= Guldbagge Honorary Award =

Swedish lifetime achievement award

- Country: Sweden
- Presented by: Swedish Film Institute
- First award: 2000
- Currently held by: Lasse Åberg (2019)
- Website: guldbaggen.se

The Guldbagge Honorary Award, instituted in 2000 for the 36th Guldbagge Awards, is a Lifetime achievement Award presented annually by the Swedish Film Institute (SFI) as part of the Guldbagge Awards (Swedish: "Guldbaggen") to people working in the Swedish motion picture industry.

== Recipients ==
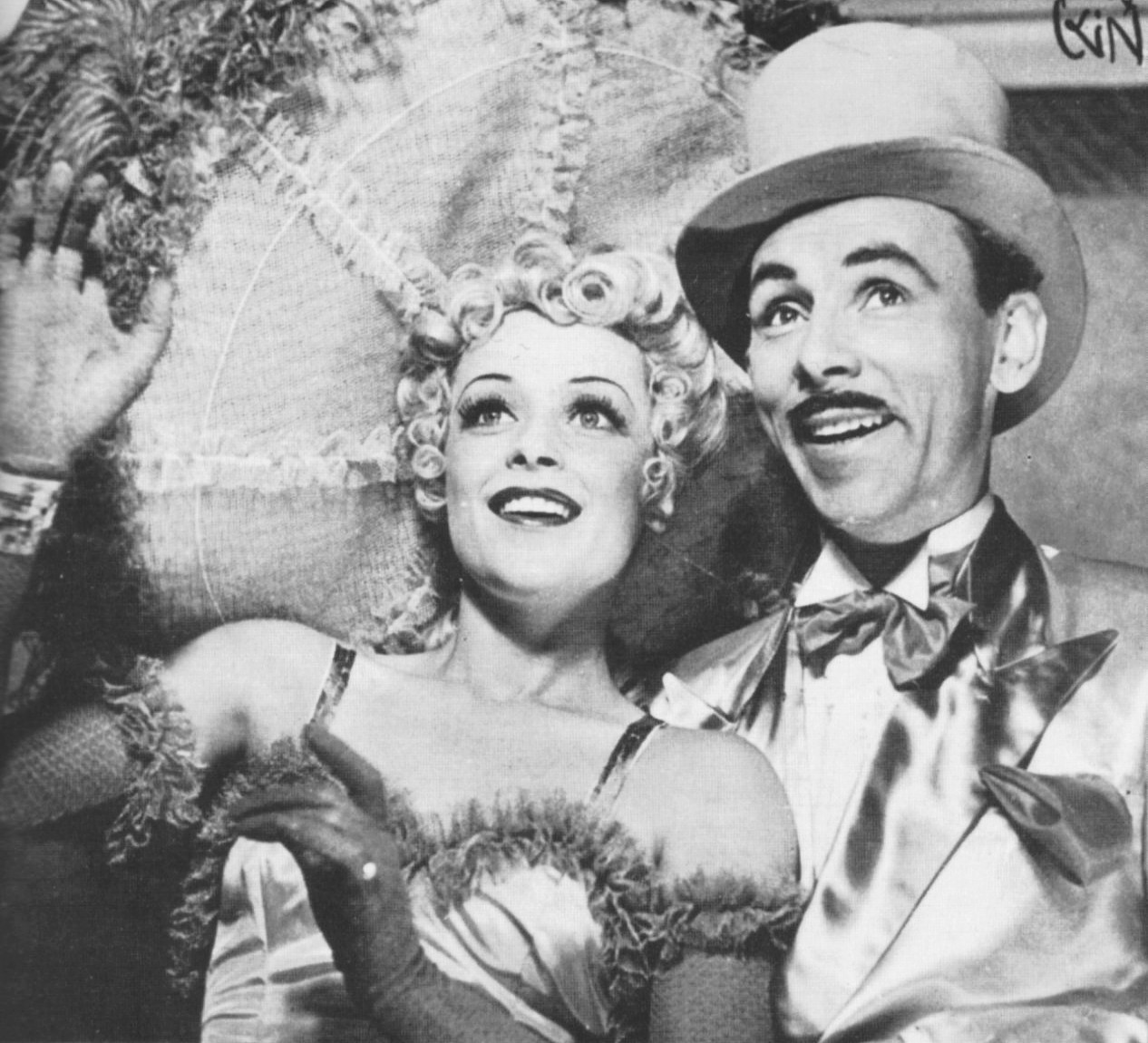
Annalisa Ericson received the first Honorary Award at the 36th Guldbagge Awards.

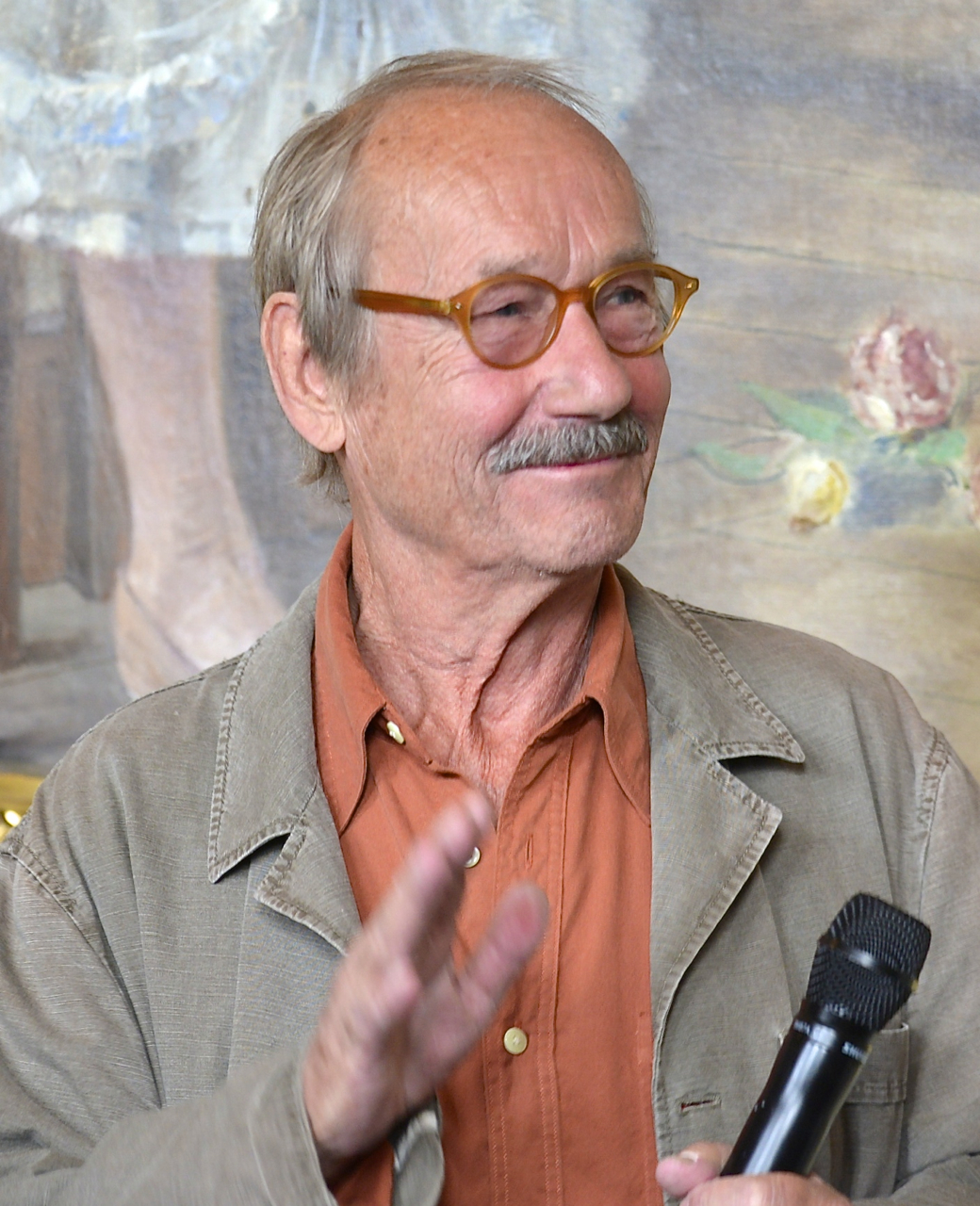
Gösta Ekman received the Honorary Award at the 43rd Guldbagge Awards.

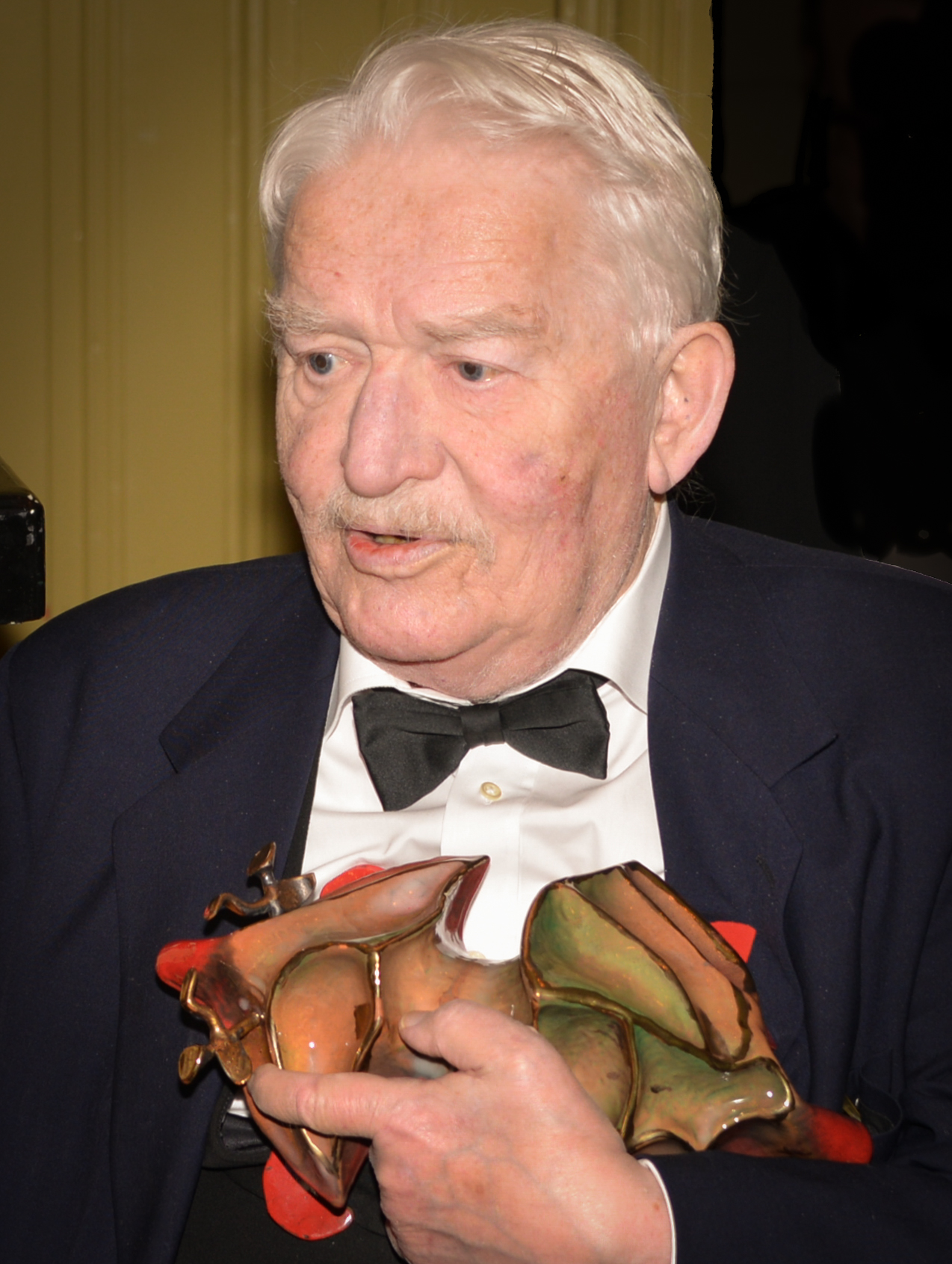
Hans Alfredson received the Honorary Award at the 48th Guldbagge Awards.

=== 2000s ===
Year	Recipient	Profession	Ref.
2000	Annalisa Ericson	Actress, dancer and revue artist	
2001	Gunnel Lindblom	Actress and director	
2002	Gunnar Fischer	Cinematographer, director and writer	
2003	Erland Josephson	Actor, director, writer and head of the Royal Dramatic Theatre 1966-1975	
2004	Sickan Carlsson	Actress and singer	
2005	Anita Björk	Actress	
2006	Nils Petter Sundgren	Film critic, Television host, cultural journalist, literary scholar and translator	
2007	Gösta Ekman	Director and actor	
2008	Harriet Andersson	Actress	
2009	Waldemar Bergendahl	Film producer and screenwriter	

=== 2010s ===
Year	Recipient	Profession	Ref.
2010	Mona Malm	Actress	
2011	Inga Landgré	Actress	
2012	Hans Alfredson	Comedian, filmmaker, writer, actor, playwright, director, set designer and translator	
2013	Kalle Boman	Professor in Independent Filmmaking and film producer	
2014	Liv Ullmann	Actress and director	
2015	Birgitta Andersson	Actress	
2016	Katinka Faragó	Script Supervisor and film producer	
2017	Stig Björkman	Writer, film critic and film director	
2018	Yvonne Lombard	Actress	
2019	Lasse Åberg	Actor, musician, film director and artist	

=== 2020s ===
Year	Recipient	Profession	Ref.
2020	Sten Ljunggren	Actor	

== See also ==
- Guldbagge Awards
- Academy Honorary Award
- Ingmar Bergman Award
- Cecil B. DeMille Award
