= Jönssonligan – Den perfekta stöten =

- Directed by: Alain Darborg
- Written by: Piotr Marciniak; Alain Darborg
- Based on: Olsen Gang by Erik Balling; Henning Bahs
- Produced by: Fredrik Wikström Nicastro
- Starring: Simon J. Berger; Alexander Karim; Torkel Petersson; Susanne Thorson; Andrea Edwards; Jens Hultén
- Cinematography: Benjam Orre
- Music by: Albin Johnsen
- Production company: Tre Vänner
- Distributed by: Nordisk Film AB
- Release date: 16 January 2015 (Sweden)
- Running time: 91 minutes
- Country: Sweden
- Language: Swedish
- Budget: 30 million SEK
- Box office: 9,673,496 SEK

Jönssonligan – Den perfekta stöten ('Johnson Gang – The Master Plan'; called Mastermind outside of Scandinavia) is a 2015 Swedish heist thriller comedy film, directed by Alain Darborg. The film is a reboot of the Swedish film series Jönssonligan, and stars Simon J. Berger, Alexander Karim, Torkel Petersson, Susanne Thorson, Andrea Edwards, and Jens Hultén. The creators have tried to make a thriller, unlike the previous films which have been comedies.

Jönssonligan – Den perfekta stöten was released on 16 January 2015 to middling reviews and poor box office. Critics and audiences felt the film lacked the comedic style they felt the franchise should have.

== Plot ==
Charles-Ingvar Jönsson (Simon J. Berger), together with his uncle Ralf, are Stockholm's most skilled car thieves. But one day a robbery goes wrong and Ralf is murdered, while Charles-Ingvar is framed for the murder. To take revenge on Ralf's killer, the corrupt business woman Wallentin (Andrea Edwards), the banking director of Wallentin Exchange, Charles-Ingvar makes a plan to execute the most complicated heist in the history of Sweden.

He recruits the fraudster Ragnar Vanheden (Alexander Karim), explosives expert Harry (Torkel Petersson), and lock specialist Rocky (Susanne Thorson), who is also Charles-Ingvar's ex-girlfriend, to help him in his revenge mission.

== Cast ==
Actor	Role
Simon J. Berger	Charles-Ingvar Jönsson
Edvin Ryding	Younger Charles-Ingvar
Alexander Karim	Ragnar Vanheden
Torkel Petersson	Dynamit-Harry
Susanne Thorson	Rocky
Andrea Edwards	Wallentin
Jens Hultén	Krantz
Niklas Falk	Ralf
Irma Hjort Erixson	Anja
Juan Rodriguez	Alejandro
Anki Larsson	School counselor
Alexandra Alegren	Wallentin's secretary
Ramtin Parvaneh	Keeper

== Production ==
=== Development ===
Over the years there had been plans to continue the film series, but these never became a reality. In 2011, Ulf Brunnberg, who played Vanheden in the eight original films, stated that he and Björn Gustafson would like to do some more films, if Gösta Ekman was coming back as Charles-Ingvar Jönsson. He said that he had tried to persuade Ekman without success. Since Ekman at that time already decided not to work anymore, Brunnberg did not think that there would be no more films. There were also plans to make more films about Lilla Jönssonligan. There has also been an idea to make a film in which the members are a little older (perhaps around 16–20 years of age) about how it all began, a little in the style of the film Kenny Begins (2009).

The production company Tre Vänner secured the rights to three new films about Jönssonligan in September 2011. These films would become reboots, with a new and younger cast. The film is separate in storyline's terms from the previous films.

The film was titled Jönssonligan – Den perfekta stöten, directed by Alain Darborg, as his directorial debut, and produced by Fredrik Wikström Nicastro, who also produced the 2010 film Easy Money, and its two sequels.

=== Casting ===
The gang members were portrayed by Simon J. Berger as Charles-Ingvar Jönsson, Torkel Petersson as Harry, Alexander Karim as Vanheden, and Susanne Thorson as Rocky. Andrea Edwards and Jens Hultén were cast as the film's villains, who according to the film's producer Fredrik Wikstrom Nicastro are more reliable than previous villains in the series.

=== Filming ===
The filming started in late October 2013, and was released on 16 January 2015.

== Reception ==
In Sweden, the film received mixed to negative reviews. In Expressen, the reviewer gave it 3 out of 5, calling it "sympathetically light-hearted, exciting, well-played and appealing", and a "somewhat clumsier version of Soderbergh's 'Ocean'-movies". In Dagens Nyheter, the reviewer gave it the same rating, praising the chemistry of the ensemble and calling the movie generally entertaining. A more negative review is found in Göteborgs-Posten, where the film got 2 out of 5 and was described as "not funny enough to work as a comedy and not thrilling enough to work as a gangster action movie".

The film was not commercially successful.

== Cancelled sequel ==
In conjunction with the premiere of the film, the film's producer Fredrik Wikström Nicastro, revealed that two sequels were planned to be released in the near future, saying that they had two scripts ready for production, but that was ultimately up to the moviegoers to decide if they should go ahead with the sequels. This was cancelled in the light of negative critical and commercial reception of the film. A second reboot was released in 2020.
