= Majken =

Majken or Maiken is a Nordic female given name that may refer to

- Maiken Caspersen Falla (born 1990), Norwegian cross-country skier
- Majken Åberg (1918–1999), Swedish Olympic discus thrower
- Majken Johansson (1930–1993), Swedish poet and writer
- Majken Vange (born 1975), Danish Olympic badminton player
- Majken Thorup (born 1979), Danish Olympic swimmer
- Majken Christensen, Danish, Los Angeles–based musician
