= Steve Bridges =

American impressionist (1963–2012)

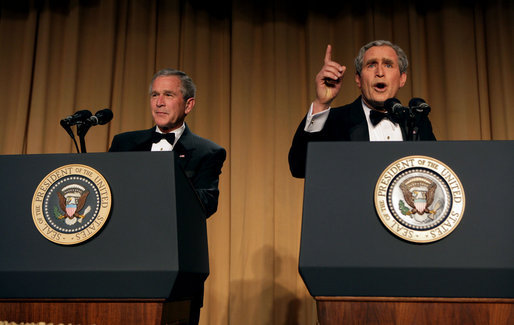
- Bridges (right) and George W. Bush at the 2006 White House Correspondents' Dinner
- Born: Stephen Lynn Bridges; May 22, 1963; Dallas, Texas, U.S.
- Died: March 3, 2012 (aged 48); Los Angeles County, California, U.S.
- Education: Biola University

Comedy career
- Genres: Stand-up; impressionist

Stephen Lynn Bridges (May 22, 1963 – March 3, 2012) was an American comedian who was known for his impressions of politicians, television characters and broadcasters including Bill Clinton, George W. Bush, Barack Obama, Arnold Schwarzenegger, Barney Fife, Homer Simpson, Tom Brokaw, Paul Harvey, and Rush Limbaugh.

== Early life ==
Bridges was born on May 22, 1963. Bridges graduated from Biola University in 1986.

== Career ==
His portrayal of George W. Bush led to Bridges being cast as the president in episodes of both JAG and its spin-off, NCIS. In 2006, he appeared alongside then-President Bush at the White House Correspondents' Association dinner, mimicking the president by voicing the president's "inner thoughts" during Bush's speech.

== Death ==
On March 3, 2012, Bridges was found dead by his maid in his Los Angeles home after he failed to return a call the day before. According to his agent, Bridges had just returned from performing in Hong Kong and went to bed complaining that he felt "super-jetlagged". His death was ruled an accident, with the probable cause "upper airway anaphylaxis" from a severe allergic reaction.

== Filmography ==
- Nurses (1994) as Torrance
- The District (2000)
- ER (2001) as Leone
- Lange Flate Ballær 2 (2008) as General of the U.S. Navy

=== as George W. Bush ===
- JAG episode "Dangerous Game" (2002)
- The Nick Cannon Show episode "Nick Takes Over a Wedding" (2002)
- NCIS episode "Yankee White" (2003)
- Whoopi episode "The Vast Right Wing Conspiracy" (2003)
- George Lopez (2003)
- Comedy Central Roast of Jeff Foxworthy (2005)
- Merry F#%$in' Christmas (2005)
- The Tonight Show with Jay Leno
- White House Correspondents Dinner (2006)
- Blue Collar Comedy Tour: One for the Road ("Yankee Doody Dandy" segment)
- The View (May 29, 2006)
- Larry King Live (2006)
- Lange Flate Ballær II (2008) (Norwegian movie)
- I Love the New Millennium (2008)
