= Lange Flate Ballær 2 =

Lange Flate Ballær II
- The Norwegian DVD cover
- Directed by: Harald Zwart
- Written by: Pål Sparre-Enger
- Produced by: Harald Zwart; Espen Horn
- Starring: Don Johnson; Jan Edgar Fjell; Anders Fjell; Petter Jørgensen; Eirik Stener Tobiassen; Kai Helge Hansen; Henrik Morken Nielsen; Frode Lie; Lisa Stokke; Marc Shelton; Louise Dedichen; Steve Bridges; Katherine Hynes
- Cinematography: Geir Hartly Andreassen
- Edited by: Jens Christian Fodstad
- Music by: John R. Graham
- Distributed by: Zwart Arbeid
- Release date: 17 March 2008
- Running time: 90 minutes
- Country: Norway
- Languages: Norwegian; English

Lange Flate Ballær II is a 2008 Norwegian comedy film directed by Harald Zwart. It is the sequel to the 2006 film Lange Flate Ballær. The main actors from the first film reprised their roles, starring along with Don Johnson as the US Navy Admiral Burnett. The title translates as "Long Flat Balls II" and released on 17 March 2008. The third sequel was released on April 1, 2022.

== Plot ==
When Norway is threatened, the six garage workers from Lange flate ballær must return to avert disaster. While stuck performing their annual Norwegian military refresher training in Heimevernet, they stumble across evidence of impending widespread destruction. Caught up in the middle of a massive NATO military exercise, they meet the US Navy Admiral Burnett (Johnson) who pulls them along into the largest covert military operation in Norwegian history.

== See also ==
- John R. Graham (composer)
- Musical Score http://cdbaby.com/cd/jrgraham
