= Harald Zwart =

Dutch-Norwegian film director

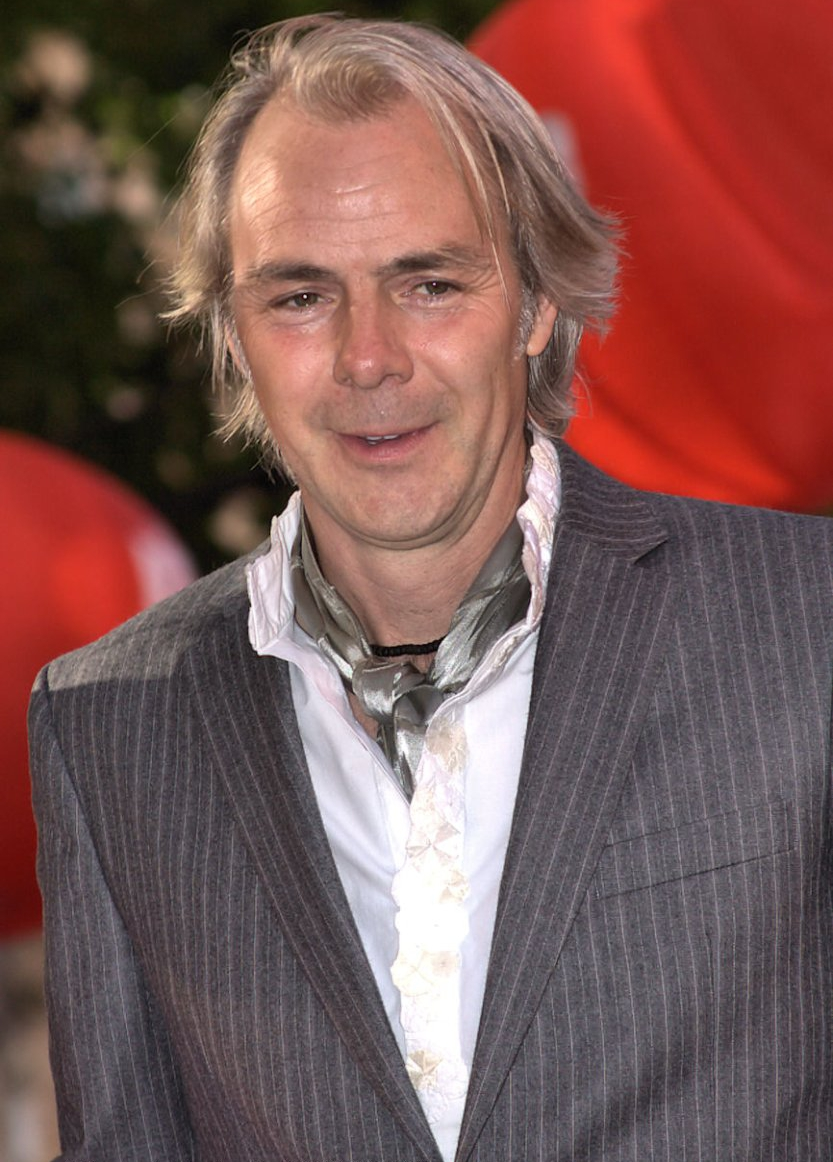
- Zwart in 2010
- Born: 1 July 1965 (age 61); Leiden, Netherlands
- Occupations: Director, writer, producer

Harald Zwart (born 1 July 1965) is a Dutch-Norwegian director, writer and producer.

== Early life ==
Although born in the Netherlands, Zwart was raised in Fredrikstad, Norway. By age eight, he had started making short films. He attended the Dutch Film Academy in Amsterdam where he received great acclaim for his student film Gabriel's Surprise. The film was later televised.

== Filmography ==
Short film

Year	Title	Director	Writer	Notes
1990	Gabriel's Surprise	Yes	Yes	
1992	Parents	Yes	Yes	Also editor
1993	Gull og grønne skoger	Yes	No	
1996	Hytta	Yes	No	
2018	Best Enemies	Yes	No	Co-directed with Emily Hopper
2019	Parents Inc	Yes	No	

Feature film

Year	Title	Director	Producer
1998	Hamilton	Yes	No
2001	One Night at McCool's	Yes	No
2003	Agent Cody Banks	Yes	No
2006	Lange Flate Ballær	Yes	Yes
2008	Lange Flate Ballær 2	Yes	Yes
2009	The Pink Panther 2	Yes	No
2010	The Karate Kid	Yes	No
2013	The Mortal Instruments: City of Bones	Yes	No
2017	The 12th Man	Yes	Yes
2022	Lange Flate Ballær 3	Yes	No
2026	Viqueens	Yes	Yes

Story writer

- Agent Cody Banks 2: Destination London (2004)

Executive producer

- Dead Snow (2009)
- Women in White (2009) (Documentary)
- Tomme Tønner (2010)
- Kon-Tiki (2012)
- Stagnation (Short)
- Amundsen (2019)
- Cadaver (2020)
- Troll (2022)
- Christmas As Usual (2023)

Television

Year	Title	Director	Producer	Writer	Notes
2001	Hamilton	Yes	No	No	Miniseries
2018–2019	Oljefondet	Yes	Yes	Yes	10 episodes
2021	Post Mortem: No One Dies in Skarnes	Yes	No	No	4 episodes

== Music videos ==
- A-ha: Velvet (Savoy song) (2000)
- A-ha: Forever Not Yours (2002)
- Morten Harket Brother (2014)
