= Public image of George W. Bush =

Public perceptions of the 43rd US president

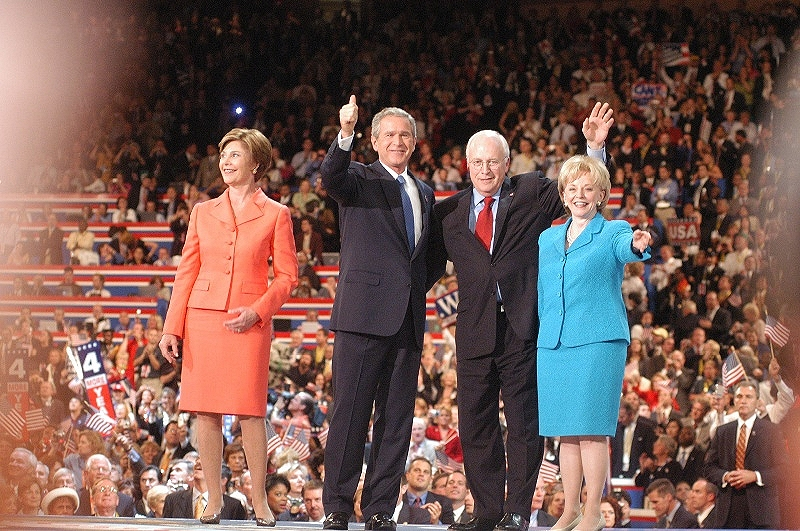
Bush at the 2004 Republican National Convention

George W. Bush, the 43rd president of the United States, has elicited a variety of public perceptions regarding his policies, personality and performance as a head of state. In the United States and elsewhere, journalists, polling organizations and others have documented the expression of an evolving array of opinions of President Bush. Time magazine named Bush as its Person of the Year for 2000 and 2004, citing him as the most influential person during these two years.

The approval ratings of Bush ranged from a record high to a record low. Bush began his presidency with ratings near 60%. In the time of national crisis following the September 11 attacks, polls showed approval ratings greater than 85%, peaking in at 92%, as well as a steady 80–90% approval for about four months after the attacks. Afterward, his ratings steadily declined as the economy suffered and the Iraq War initiated by his administration continued. By early 2006, his average rating was near 40%, and in July 2008, a poll indicated a low of 22%.

== Background ==
At the beginning of his first term, Bush's reputation suffered due to his narrow victory in Florida and the attendant controversy surrounding his electoral college victory, which included accusations of vote suppression and tampering. While routinely criticized by Democrats, Bush was also sometimes criticized by Republicans. A number of American celebrities and sports and media personalities engaged in heated criticism of Bush.

Bush was also subject to criticism in the international community for his foreign policy. Street protests sometimes occurred during Bush's diplomatic visits to other countries. His policies were the subject of heated criticism in the 2002 elections in Germany and the 2006 elections in Canada.

== Support among conservatives ==
Public opinion polling data of Bush from February 2001 to January 2009. Blue denotes "approve", red "disapprove", and green "unsure". Spikes in approval followed the September 11 attacks, the beginning of the 2003 Iraq War and the capture of Saddam Hussein.

Bush has enjoyed strong support among Republicans and Americans holding conservative views, and for the 2004 election, 95–98% of the Republican electorate approved of and voted for Bush, a figure exceeding the approval of Ronald Reagan. This support waned, however, due mostly to Republicans' growing frustration with Bush on the issues of spending and illegal immigration. Some Republicans even began criticizing Bush on his policies in Iraq, Iran, and the Palestinian territories.

== Personal image ==
=== Country image ===
Raised in West Texas, Bush's accent, vacations on his Texas ranch, and penchant for country metaphors contribute to his folksy, American cowboy image. "I think people look at him and think John Wayne", says Piers Morgan, editor of the British Daily Mirror. It has been suggested that Bush's accent was a deliberate and active choice, as a way of distinguishing himself from his family's traditionally wealthy, intellectual, Northeastern image, and anchoring himself to his Texas roots. Both supporters and detractors have pointed to his country persona as reasons for their support or criticism.

=== Vision ===
In contrast to his father, George H. W. Bush, who was perceived as having troubles with an overarching unifying theme, George W. Bush embraced larger visions and was seen as a man of larger ideas and associated huge risks.

=== Intellectual capacity ===
Bush's intellectual capacities were questioned by the media which speculated about his IQ. A hoax report claiming Bush had the lowest IQ of any American President of the last 50 years circulated in 2001.

Though no official IQ test score for Bush has been found, the score he received on his SAT during his final year of preparatory school at the exclusive Phillips Academy in Andover, Massachusetts, is known. He scored 1206. The score that Bush received on his qualifying test for the military suggests that his IQ was in the mid-120s, placing him in the 95th percentile of the population for intelligence. An article published in the journal Political Psychology estimated Bush's IQ at 125. The same study estimated the IQ of Bush's predecessor Bill Clinton at 149. The study's director noted that "Bush may be 'much smarter' than the findings imply". A lecturer in American politics at Warwick University said: "A major part of [Bush's] public persona, to some extent, I think deliberately, is that he is not an intellectual. But he went to Yale, he has had an exclusive upbringing and he is by no means a dimwit."

Bush's detractors tended to focus on various linguistic errors made by him during his public speeches, colloquially known as Bushisms. His mispronunciation of certain words was ridiculed in the media and in popular culture. Even as early as the 2000 presidential debates, it was the subject of a Saturday Night Live sketch (see Strategery). Perhaps his most famous nonstandard pronunciation is that of nuclear, pronouncing it /ˈnukjələr/ NOO-kyə-lər instead of /ˈnukliər/ NOO-klee-ər, although he is not the only American president to have done this. Merriam-Webster lists this as a variant but nonstandard pronunciation of nuclear.

== Domestic perception of Bush ==
Bush approval rating from 2001 to 2006. Notable spikes in his approval rating followed the September 11 attacks, the beginning of the 2003 Iraq conflict, and the capture of Saddam Hussein.

Bush began his presidency with approval ratings near 50%. Following the September 11 attacks, Bush held approval ratings of greater than 85%, among the highest for any President. Since then, his approval ratings and approval of his handling of domestic, economic, and foreign policy issues steadily declined, and despite consistent efforts to do so, President Bush and his administration were unable to rally public support for the last three years, with each year seeing a steady decline in the Administration's support level to the point of Bush eventually dropping to a 19% approval rating and 77% disapproval rating, both records for a sitting president.

In 2002, Bush had the highest approval rating of any president during a midterm congressional election since Dwight D. Eisenhower. In an unusual deviation from the historical trend of midterm elections, the Republican Party regained control of the Senate and added to its majority in the House of Representatives. Typically, the President's party loses congressional seats in the midterm elections; 2002 marked only the third midterm election since the Civil War that the party in control of the White House gained seats in both houses of Congress (others were 1902 and 1934).

In 2003, Bush's approval spiked upward at the time of the Space Shuttle Columbia disaster in February. The upward trend continued through the invasion of Iraq in March. By late 2003, when presidential opponents began their campaigns in earnest, his approval numbers were in the low to middle 50s. Most polls tied the decline to growing concern over the US-led occupation of Iraq and a slow recovery from the 2001 recession. Polls of May 2004 showed anywhere from a 53% to a 46% approval rating.

In April 2006, the president's approval continued to decline. Four states continue to maintain a positive approval rating: Utah, Wyoming, Idaho, and Nebraska. His disapproval rating in traditionally red states had risen, with higher than 60% of voters disapproving in Ohio, Florida, Arkansas, New Mexico, Nevada, Colorado, Virginia, Missouri, and Iowa. Even in his conservative-spun home state of Texas, disapproval reached 51 percent. His disapproval rating in several American states had reached an all-time high, with more than 70% disapproving in Rhode Island, Massachusetts, Delaware, Vermont, and New York. His highest approval rating stood at 55% in Utah, and his lowest, 24%, in Rhode Island.

In polls conducted between August 7 and 16, 2006, Bush's average approval rating was 37.0%, and his average disapproval rating was 57.3%.

A poll taken in mid September 2006 indicated that 48 percent of Americans believed the war with Iraq has made the US less safe, while 41 percent believed the war has made the US safer from terrorism. Another poll shows that a majority of Americans, by a margin of 61 to 35 percent, believe that the United States is not better off because of Bush's policies.

At the conclusion of 2006, an AP-AOL News telephone poll of 1,004 adults found Bush to be both the "top villain" and "top hero" of the year. Bush was followed in the "villain" poll by Osama bin Laden, who took in 8 percent to Bush's 25 percent; Saddam Hussein (6 percent); and Iran's Mahmoud Ahmadinejad (5 percent). In the hero poll, Bush's 13 percent was followed by: Soldiers/troops in Iraq (6 percent), Jesus Christ (3 percent), Barack Obama (3 percent), and Oprah Winfrey (3 percent).

Polls conducted after Bush's troop surge strategy was announced in January 2007 showed his approval rating had dropped to approximately 32%.

On February 13, 2008, an average of major polls indicated that Bush's approval rating stood at 33.3%. The same average showed, for polls issued during the period from September 5 to 16, 2008, that Bush's approval rating was 31.9%, and his disapproval rating was 64.8%.

A poll by Rasmussen Reports on December 10, 2005, asked, "Should President Bush be impeached and removed from office?" 32% said "yes", and 58% said "no". Earlier polls asked conditional versions of the impeachment question. For example, Zogby International on November 2, 2005, asked whether respondents agreed with the statement, "If President Bush did not tell the truth about his reasons for going to war with Iraq, Congress should consider holding him accountable through impeachment." Americans agreed with this, 53% to 42%. A poll by Newsweek on October 19, 2006, revealed that 51% of respondents believed that the impeachment of Bush should be a priority. An August 2008 poll found that 41% of Americans thought that Bush is the worst President in United States history, while 50% disagreed.

Bush's critics have questioned his leadership skills regarding some events. One occasion was on the moment of the September 11 World Trade Center attacks: after being told by Chief of Staff Andrew Card that the US was "under attack", Bush continued with a reading lesson with elementary school children for seven minutes. Democratic 2004 presidential candidate John Kerry cited Bush's lack of swift action, calling into question the incumbent's leadership capabilities, and concluding: "Americans want to know that the person they choose as president has all the skills and ability, all of the mental toughness, all of the gut instinct necessary to be a strong commander in chief."

The 9/11 Commission later released a summary of Bush's closed-door testimony, which stated that Bush's "instinct was to project calm, not to have the country see an excited reaction at a moment of crisis". It went on to say "The President felt he should project strength and calm until he could better understand what was happening." This situation was featured prominently in Michael Moore's 2004 documentary Fahrenheit 9/11.

Twice, in late 2001 and early 2002, Bush stated that before entering the classroom he had seen on a television set the first plane hit the World Trade Center, and that he had assumed it was an accident. This was impossible, as no televised footage of the first plane crashing into the tower was broadcast until the afternoon of that day. The White House explained his remarks as "a mistaken recollection".

=== Domestic policy ===
Domestic criticism of Bush has waxed and waned throughout his administration. Before 9/11, Bush was reviled by the bulk of the American left, mostly for his role in the controversial 2000 election, and for his No Child Left Behind education program. The next major domestic item which Bush faced significant opposition to was his program of tax cuts, codified in the Economic Growth and Tax Relief Reconciliation Act of 2001 and the Jobs and Growth Tax Relief Reconciliation Act of 2003. Both acts ultimately passed, but calls for their repeal lasted until the end of the 2004 campaign. Democratic candidate Howard Dean in particular called for a repeal of the part of the tax cuts which affected the wealthiest Americans in order to fund public health care programs and reduce the federal deficit.

After Bush was re-elected, he made Social Security reform a top priority. He proposed options to permit Americans to divert a portion of their Social Security tax (FICA) into secured investments, creating a "nest egg" that he claimed would enjoy steady growth. This led Democrats to label the program a "privatization" of Social Security. Bush embarked on a 60-day tour to shore up public support for the plan, attacking the political reaction against reforms. Ultimately, Congressional Republicans could not reach a consensus on the plan, and the Democrats were unanimously opposed. Bush was left without any political will to pass his reforms. The issue was dropped, and the status quo maintained.

Bush had been increasingly forced to defend his actions on many fronts and had been unable to generate widespread support in the nation as a whole. After the Democratic Party regained control of both houses of Congress in the 2006 midterm elections, MSNBC reported that "The war in Iraq, scandals in Congress and declining support for Bush and Republicans on Capitol Hill defined the battle for House and Senate control".

Calling Bush "The Mother of All Big Spenders", the libertarian think tank Cato Institute writes that "Sadly, the Bush administration has consistently sacrificed sound policy to the god of political expediency". Cato's Chris Edwards said, "When he gives speeches now, you hear him bashing the Democrats on overspending ... It sounds ridiculous, because we know he's a big spender." "After running up $3 trillion in new debt – including more than half a trillion dollars for his flawed Iraq policy - it is astounding that the president is once again lecturing Congress about fiscal responsibility and fiscal priorities," stated Senate Majority Leader Harry Reid (D-Nev).

Alan Greenspan, chairman of the Federal Reserve for 18 years, serving under six Presidents and who describes himself as "a lifelong Libertarian Republican", writes in his book The Age of Turbulence: Adventures in a New World that Bush and the congressional Republicans "swapped principle for power". "Little value was placed on rigorous economic policy debate or the weighing of long-term consequences".

Greenspan, again promoting his book, also says "I am saddened that it is politically inconvenient to acknowledge what everyone knows: the Iraq war is largely about oil" and "getting Saddam out of there was very important, but had nothing to do with weapons of mass destruction, it had to do with oil." With regards to the costs of the war in Iraq, the nonpartisan Congressional Budget Office estimates that it will come to between one and one and a half trillion dollars by 2010.

Those costs – both to sustain the current mission in Iraq and to pay longer-term 'hidden' expenses like troop healthcare and replacement equipment – are far more than US officials advertised when Congress gave President Bush the authority to launch the invasion in March 2003. At the time, the White House and then-defense secretary Donald Rumsfeld predicted a quick, decisive victory and counted on Iraqi oil revenues to pay for the war. And when Lawrence Lindsey, one of Bush's top budget advisers, estimated in 2003 that the entire undertaking could cost as much as $200 billion, he was fired ... McGovern said he is worried about the long-term financial impact of the war, adding that his primary concern is that the United States is borrowing money to pay for it. Some leading economists have predicted that, depending on how long troops remain in Iraq, the endeavor could reach several trillion dollars as a result of more 'hidden' costs —including recruiting expenses to replenish the ranks and the lifelong benefits the government pays to veterans. 'It is being paid for on the national credit card,' McGovern said. 'It is being put on the backs of our kids and grandkids. That is indefensible.

In fact, according to the former World Bank vice-president, Joseph Stiglitz, when factors like medical and welfare costs of US military servicemen are added in, the cost to date is closer to $3.3 trillion. However, continues Stiglitz, "Three trillion is a very conservative number, the true costs are likely to be much larger than that ... The money being spent on the war each week would be enough to wipe out illiteracy around the world ... Just a few days' funding would be enough to provide health insurance for US children who were not covered," he said.

The relaxed regulation under the Bush presidency are regarded to have been a major contributing factor to the subprime mortgage crisis, and there are fears that the United States and the world economy could slide into another Great Depression.

A Harper's Magazine column by Linda Bilmes, a lecturer in Public Finance at Harvard's Kennedy School, and Joseph Stiglitz titled "The $10 trillion hangover: Paying the price for eight years of Bush", "estimate that the cost of undoing the Bush administration's economic choices, from the wars in Iraq and Afghanistan to the collapse of the financial system, soaring debt and new commitments to interest payments and Medicare, all add up to over $10 trillion". See also National Debt Graph: Bush Sets 50-Year Record. The National debt from George Washington to the beginning of Ronald Reagan's term totaled about one trillion dollars.

The controversial dismissal of seven US attorneys by the Bush administration's Department of Justice (DOJ) in 2006, and their replacement by interim appointees, led critics to argue that the administration had undermined both the integrity of the Department of Justice and the non-partisan tradition of US Attorneys. Others likened the event to the Watergate scandal, referring to it as Gonzales-gate, and members of Congress from both parties called for the resignation of Attorney General Alberto Gonzales.

==== Response to Hurricane Katrina ====
Bush came under more criticism when Hurricane Katrina slammed into the Gulf Coast region during the early hours of August 29, 2005. In the wake of the hurricane, two levees protecting New Orleans from Lake Pontchartrain collapsed, leading to widespread flooding. In the aftermath of this disaster, thousands of city residents, unable to evacuate prior to the hurricane, became stranded with little or no relief for several days, resulting in lawless and unsanitary conditions in some areas. Blame for inadequate disaster response was partially attributed to state and local authorities, but public outcry in the disaster's early hours was largely directed at the Bush administration, mainly the Federal Emergency Management Agency (FEMA) and the Department of Homeland Security alleging weak crisis management and coordination. In fact, a Canadian search-and-rescue team actually made it to a New Orleans suburb five days before US aid arrived.

Others have identified political conservatism as the overriding cause of problems in the way the disaster was handled. These critics argue that the alleged unreadiness of the United States National Guard, negligence of federal authorities, and haplessness of officials such as Michael Brown did not represent incompetence on the part of the federal authorities, but were instead natural and deliberate consequences of the conservative philosophy embraced by the Bush administration, especially "sink or swim" policies to force reductions in government expenditure and privatize key government responsibilities such as disaster preparedness, both of which resulted in the systematic dismantling of FEMA by the US Department of Homeland Security.

Criticism led to the resignation of FEMA director Michael Brown, and eventually, Bush himself accepted personal responsibility for what he deemed "serious problems in the federal government's response" in a September 2005 press conference. Several politicians called for either congressional or independent investigations, claiming that the Executive Branch cannot satisfactorily investigate itself.

==== Environment ====
Bush has been criticized by national and international environmental groups for his administration's rollbacks of environmental protections going back more than three decades. These are in areas ranging from the Endangered Species Act and the Clean Air and Clean Water Acts to climate change. According to MSNBC:

After four years in office, the George W. Bush administration has compiled an environmental record that is taking our nation in a new and dangerous direction. Last year alone, Bush administration agencies made more than 150 actions that weakened our environmental laws. Over the course of the first term, this administration led the most thorough and destructive campaign against America's environmental safeguards in the past 40 years.

In "Texas Chainsaw Management" (2007) Robert F. Kennedy Jr. argues that "The verdict on George W. Bush as the nation's environmental steward has already been written in stone. No president has mounted a more sustained and deliberate assault on the nation's environment. No president has acted with more solicitude toward polluting industries. Assaulting the environment across a broad front, the Bush administration has promoted and implemented more than 400 measures that eviscerate 30 years of environmental policy." Kennedy has also written a book Crimes Against Nature: How George W. Bush and His Corporate Pals Are Plundering the Country and Hijacking Our Democracy.

Bush has also been criticized by the Union of Concerned Scientists, representing over 20 Nobel Laureates, who accuse him of failing to acknowledge basic science on environmental issues. The group says that the Bush administration has engaged in intentional suppression and distortion of facts regarding the environment.

In the waning days of his administration, Bush sought rule changes which would negatively impact a wide range of environmental issues.

George Bush is behaving like a furious defaulter whose home is about to be repossessed. Smashing the porcelain, ripping the doors off their hinges, he is determined that there will be nothing worth owning by the time the bastards kick him out. His midnight regulations, opening America's wilderness to logging and mining, trashing pollution controls, tearing up conservation laws, will do almost as much damage in the last 60 days of his presidency as he achieved in the foregoing 3,000. His backers – among them the nastiest pollutocrats in America – are calling in their favours. But this last binge of vandalism is also the Bush presidency reduced to its essentials. Destruction is not an accidental product of its ideology. Destruction is the ideology. Neoconservatism is power expressed by showing that you can reduce any part of the world to rubble.

==== Economic policies ====
Moral and ethical questions have been raised over the billions of dollars Bush has requested for the Iraq war, which Senate Majority Leader Harry Reid (D-Nevada) has said ensures that less money is made available to help children and the poor in the United States. Critics have accused him of stinginess toward poor children with regards to health care in a time when it is increasingly unaffordable. Another example is Bush's effort to cut food stamps for the poor. In 2005, Bush called for "billions of dollars in cuts that will touch people on food stamps and farmers on price supports, children under Medicaid and adults in public housing." While passed by the Republican Congress, initially the "White House proposed the restriction".

=== Foreign policy and national security ===
==== War on terror ====
No official moral leadership emerged to challenge Americans to think constructively about our place in the world, to redefine civic commitment and public responsibility. There was no man in a wheelchair in the White House urging on us a reassessment of American strength and weakness. What we had was a chest beater in a borrowed flight suit, instructing us to max out our credit cards for the cause.

— Susan Faludi, The Terror Dream: Fear and Fantasy in Post-9/11 America (2007)

Bush received criticism for publicly using phrases like "bring it on" and "wanted dead or alive," both regarding terrorists. Senator Frank Lautenberg, D-NJ, called Bush's language "irresponsible and inciteful". "I am shaking my head in disbelief," Lautenberg said. "When I served in the Army in Europe during World War II, I never heard any military commander – let alone the commander in chief – invite enemies to attack U.S. troops." The Iraqi Resistance group known as the "Islamic Jihad Army" put out a video that stated "George W. Bush, you have asked us to 'bring it on.' And so help me, [we will] like you never expected. Do you have another challenge?" Bush apologized for these comments in 2006.

==== Iraq ====
Bush has taken a significant amount of criticism for his decision to invade Iraq in March 2003 and his handling of the situation afterwards. As Bush organized the effort, and ordered the invasion himself, he has borne the brunt of the criticism for the undeclared war. A Newsweek poll taken in June 2007 showed a record 73% of respondents disapproving of Bush's handling of the war in Iraq.

==== Enhanced interrogation techniques controversy ====
Another point of discussion has been whether the enhanced interrogation techniques in the Abu Ghraib prison and the Guantánamo Bay detainment camp constitutes torture or not. Although a CNN/USA Today/Gallup poll "found that sizable majorities of Americans disagree with tactics ranging from leaving prisoners naked and chained in uncomfortable positions for hours, to trying to make a prisoner think he was being drowned.

Bush has stated that "We do not torture." Yet, many people and governments and non-governmental organizations disagree and have staged several protests. These sentiments are partly a result of the Pentagon's suggestion that the president can decide whether normal strictures on torture still apply if it outweighs the security of the nation, and because the Bush administration has repeatedly acted against attempts to restrict controversial interrogation techniques, including signing statements by Bush to exclude himself from the laws created by the Detainee Treatment Act of 2005 as well as vetoing legislation that would have made waterboarding and other coercive interrogation methods illegal. Furthermore, some are concerned by the Bush administration's use of Extraordinary rendition, where individuals are sent to other countries where torture can easily occur without any form of oversight. Bush defends this practice on the basis that:

... the United States government has an obligation to protect the American people. It's in our country's interests to find those who would do harm to us and get them out of harm's way. And we will do so within the law, and we will do so in honoring our commitment not to torture people. And we expect the countries where we send somebody to, not to torture, as well. But you bet, when we find somebody who might do harm to the American people, we will detain them and ask others from their country of origin to detain them. It makes sense. The American people expect us to do that.

A Pentagon memo lists many interrogation techniques which were requested and approved during Bush's presidency on the basis that "The current guidelines for interrogation procedures at GTMO limit the ability of interrogators to counter advanced resistance". The Bush administration's connection to these controversial interrogation techniques had been one of the main considerations in the movement to impeach Bush.

These controversial enhanced interrogation techniques have in several cases become military policy and in response to Abu Ghraib prisoner abuse controversy Germany had looked into seeking to charge Rumsfeld and two others with war crimes.

==== Foreign aid ====
Under the Bush administration, more aid has been given to Africa than under any other US president or world leader in history, with a total of $15 billion spent to fight AIDS and poverty as well as diplomatic assistance between warring peoples and other humanitarian efforts. However, this was in nominal terms. In real terms, he actually lowered the percent of GDP given as aid to foreign countries.

== Bush derangement syndrome neologism ==
American pundit and psychiatrist Charles Krauthammer, noting the reaction of liberals to Bush and his policies, in a 2003 column coined the term Bush derangement syndrome to describe "the acute onset of paranoia in otherwise normal people in reaction to the policies, the presidency—nay—the very existence of George W. Bush". While Krauthammer's column was somewhat tongue-in-cheek (e.g., "What is worrying epidemiologists about the Dean incident, however, is that heretofore no case had been reported in Vermont, or any other dairy state"), the term indicates a belief that some extreme criticisms of Bush are of emotional origin rather than based in fact or logic. The term has been adopted by writers across the political spectrum and is most closely associated with liberal reaction to Bush policies past and present.

The neologism is not unique to Bush, with several commentators borrowing Krauthammer's coinage to define Thatcher derangement syndrome, in reference to Margaret Thatcher, referring to the extremely vitriolic reactions Thatcher evokes among British leftists, both during and following her tenure as Britain's prime minister, and most notably distinguished in the aftermath of her death in 2013. Similarly, the term Trump derangement syndrome was coined to refer to perceived irrational criticism of Donald Trump.

== Foreign perception of Bush ==
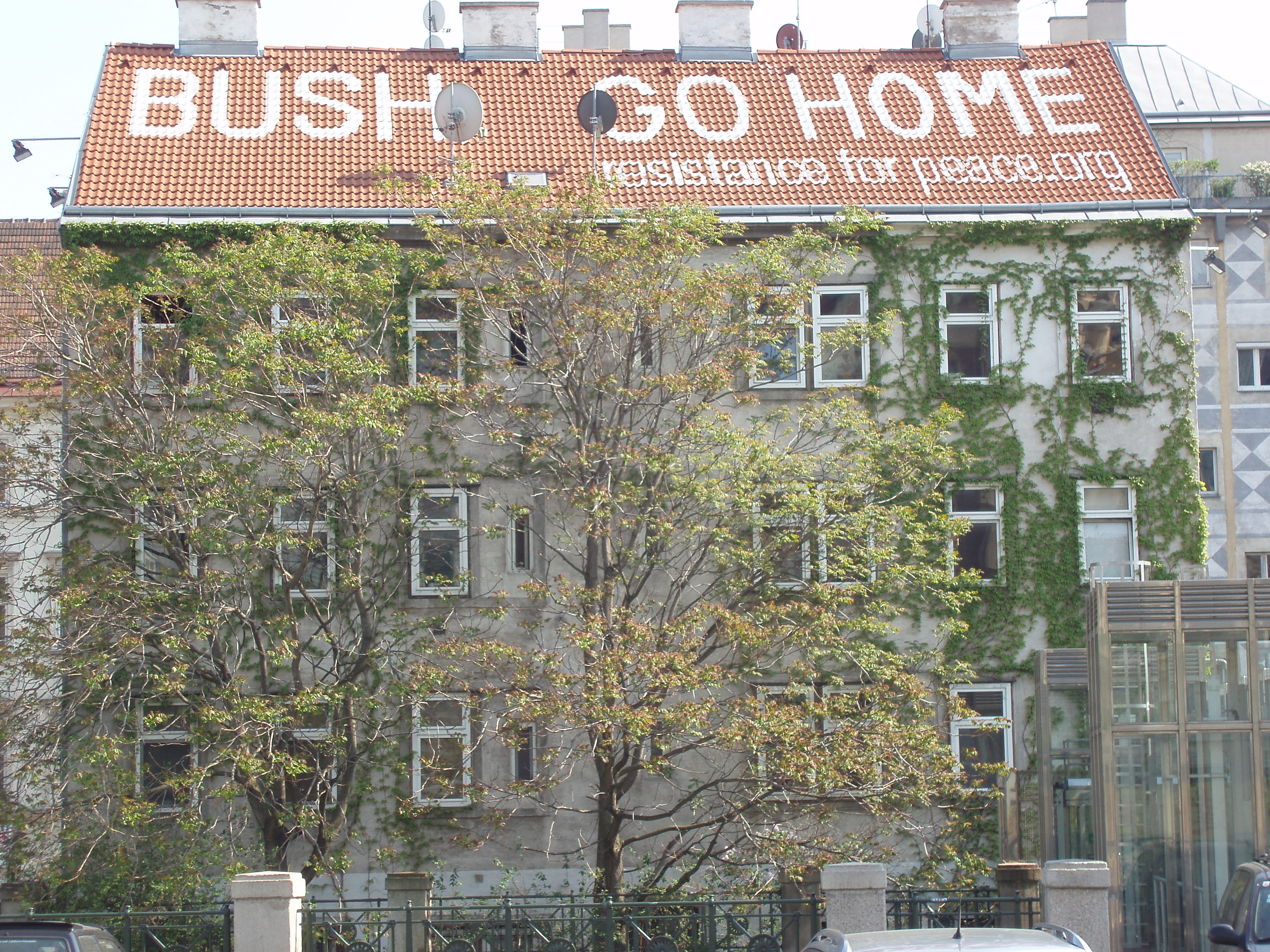
"Bush Go Home" in Vienna, 2007

At the time of Bush's re-election there was a mixed response from around the World. A global sampling in 2005 of 21 nations found that 58% of those sampled believed that the president's reelection would have a negative impact on their peace and security; only 26% believed it would have a positive one.

In 18 of the 21 countries surveyed, a majority of respondents held an unfavorable opinion of Bush. Respondents indicated that they judged his administration as "negative" for world security.

In the United Kingdom the Daily Mirror newspaper ran the following headline the day of Bush's reelection: "How Can 59,054,087 People Be So Dumb?", underlining Bush's unpopularity in some sections of the British press.

After his reelection in 2004, Bush was viewed favorably by 38% and unfavorably by 53% in Italy. However this was worse in other countries: "Three-quarters of those in Spain and more than 80% in France and Germany had a negative view of President Bush's role in world affairs." In Turkey, 72% of those polled said that Bush's reelection made them "feel worse about Americans". In November 2006, a survey taken in Great Britain, Mexico, and Canada showed that they believed Bush was more dangerous than North Korean leader Kim Jong-il and Iranian President Mahmoud Ahmadinejad.

In Islamic countries, opinion of Bush was even less favorable. Bush's unfavorable ratings there were particularly high, often over 90%. In Jordan, for example, Bush's favorable rating was only nine percent.

Bush enjoyed somewhat more favorable views among the populations of some allied states. In one multi-nation poll after Bush's 2004 reelection, the three countries (out of 21 polled) in which a majority or plurality saw Bush's return to office as positive for peace and security in the world were the Philippines (63%), India (62%), and Poland (44%). In one poll of 10 countries, Israel was the only country where the population had a net favorable opinion, with 62 percent favoring Bush.

== Impact of policies ==
=== Iraq War ===
By 2016, the public consensus in both parties was that the Iraq War was based on invalid reasons, did not accomplish anything positive, and was highly detrimental. Bush admitted in his 2010 memoir Decision Points: "The reality was that I had sent American troops into combat based in large part on intelligence that proved false ... No one was more shocked or angry than I was when we didn't find the weapons. I had a sickening feeling every time I thought about it. I still do."

During the 2016 debates, Donald Trump frequently stated the invasion was totally wasteful and did not produce any useful results. When Jeb Bush seemed to defend the Iraq War in 2016, he was widely criticized, and had to reverse his answer, saying, "Knowing what we know now I would not have engaged—I would not have gone into Iraq".

Republican Vice President JD Vance labeled the Iraq invasion (in which he served in as a Marine) as disastrous.

== Surveys of historians ==
Since 2006, surveys of professional historians have given the Bush presidency low marks. A 2006 Siena College poll of 744 professors reported the following results:

- "George W. Bush has just finished five years as President. If today were the last day of his presidency, how would you rank him? The responses were: Great: 2%; Near Great: 5%; Average: 11%; Below Average: 24%; Failure: 58%."
- "In your judgment, do you think he has a realistic chance of improving his rating? Two-thirds (67%) responded no; less than a quarter (23%) responded yes; and 10% chose no opinion or not applicable."

Thomas Kelly, professor emeritus of American studies at Siena College, said: "President Bush would seem to have small hope for high marks from the current generation of practicing historians and political scientists. In this case, current public opinion polls actually seem to cut the President more slack than the experts do." Dr. Douglas Lonnstrom, Siena College professor of statistics and director of the Siena Research Institute, stated: "In our 2002 presidential rating, with a group of experts comparable to this current poll, President Bush ranked 23rd of 42 presidents. That was shortly after 9/11. Clearly, the professors do not think things have gone well for him in the past few years. These are the experts that teach college students today and will write the history of this era tomorrow."

In 2008, the History News Network conducted an unscientific poll among 109 professional historians. That poll found that, among those professional historians, 98% believe that the Bush presidency is a failure, and that 61% believe it to be the worst in history. Another poll done in 2009 by C-SPAN among 65 professional historians ranks Bush 36 of 42 former presidents.

A 2010 Siena College poll of 238 Presidential scholars found that Bush was ranked 39th out of 43, with poor ratings in handling of the economy, communication, ability to compromise, foreign policy accomplishments and intelligence.

== Notable critical works about Bush ==
=== Fahrenheit 9/11 ===
In 2004, Michael Moore released his documentary Fahrenheit 9/11, which went on to become the highest-grossing political documentary of all time. The film is critical of Bush and the war on terrorism. Christopher Hitchens and Ed Koch have criticized Fahrenheit 9/11 as dishonest and inaccurate.

=== W. ===
In 2008, director Oliver Stone, a noted liberal and Democrat who is known as a critic of Republican policymakers including Bush, directed a biographical film about Bush entitled W., featuring Josh Brolin in the title role. W. was appraised as a surprisingly even-handed and restrained treatment of Bush and his policies, given Bush's incredibly low popularity around the time of the film's release.

=== Vice ===
In 2018, director Adam McKay, who had previously directed The Big Short in 2015, released Vice, a biopic on George W. Bush's Vice President Dick Cheney, with Christian Bale in the lead role, and Sam Rockwell in the role of George W. Bush. Although primarily focusing on Cheney, Adam McKay remains overtly critical of George W. Bush and his administration. The film portrays Bush as an ambitious former alcoholic seeking only to "impress his father, and shows him as malleable and boastful".

== Post-presidential image ==
=== Miss Me Yet? billboard ===
In February 2010 a roadside billboard appeared featuring an image of George W. Bush and a caption with the words "MISS ME YET?". The billboard was initially spotted on Interstate 35 in Wyoming, Minnesota but soon other billboards like it popped up around the country. It was first considered to be an internet hoax, but was confirmed as a real advertisement. The Billboard led to other Bush-themed merchandise with the catchphrase "Miss Me Yet?" from agencies such as CafePress, and the image plus the related caption became an internet meme.

The billboard was mentioned on Rush Limbaugh's talk radio show as some callers mentioned the billboard did exist. It was later discovered to have been created and sponsored by an anonymous source who wanted to remain that way as per the billboard owner Schubert & Hoey Outdoor Advertising. According to the billboard owner, the sign was purchased by a group of small business owners located in the seven-county metropolitan area. Later, Mike Rivard, one of the six business owners from Minnesota, came forward and told Fox News that one of the reasons why they did it was they thought it was a hilarious message, and the image they used was found online.

=== Effect of Decision Points memoir ===
Journalists from several media sources opined that the publication of Bush's memoir Decision Points in November 2010 was intended to or would have the effect of improving his post presidential image.

=== Ranking of George W. Bush as US President ===
After he left office, Bush has been ranked between 31st (by USPC) and 39th (by Siena Research Institute) out of 44 presidents in the history of the US. However, following the election of Donald Trump as the 45th president, 61% of Americans in 2018 said they had a favorable view of Bush, compared to 33% when he left office. Also in 2018, 54% of Democrats viewed Bush favorably.

== See also ==
- Bushism
- Fictionalized portrayals of George W. Bush
- Historical rankings of presidents of the United States
