= Michael Segerström =

Swedish actor and director (born 1944)

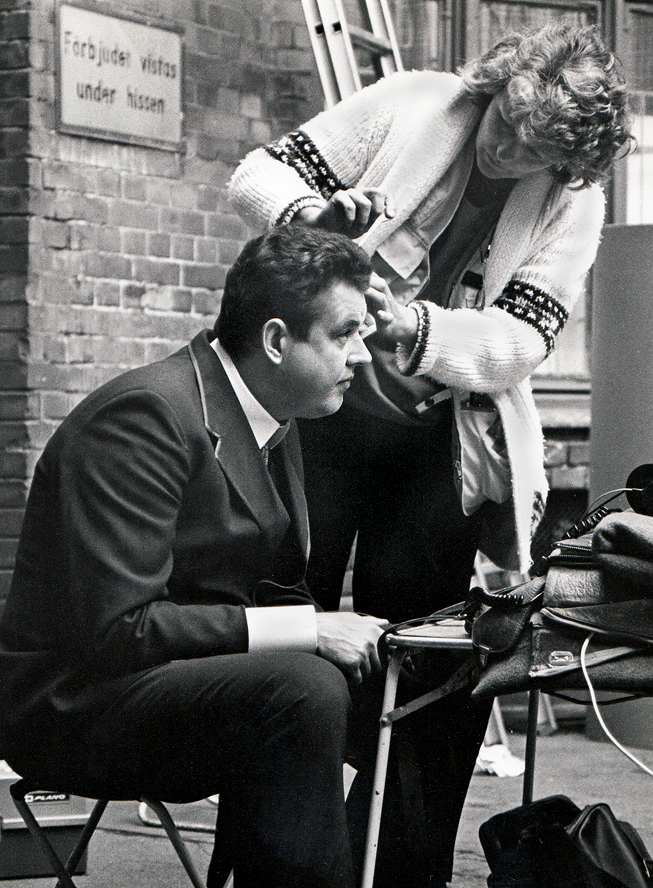
- Segerström before filming of All light on me! a docudrama from 1987 on Edvard Persson's life.
- Born: Karl Kristian Mikael Segerström; 20 May 1944 (age 81); Lund, Sweden
- Occupations: Actor, director

Karl Kristian Mikael Segerström (born 20 May 1944) is a Swedish actor and director.

Segerström was born in Lund and has worked at theatres in Stockholm, Gothenburg, and Helsingborg as well as in film with Jönssonligan and others. He specializes in personal monologues, written by himself and performed on stage.

== Filmography ==
- 1955 - Blå himmel (English: Blue Sky)
- 1976 - Sven Klangs kvintett (English: Sven Klang's Combo)
- 1979 - Barnförbjudet
- 1981 - På kurs med Kurt (TV)
- 1981 - Göta kanal eller Vem drog ur proppen? (English: Göta Canal or Who Pulled the Plug?)
- 1982 - Gräsänklingar
- 1982 - Dubbelsvindlarna (TV)
- 1984 - Skatten på Bråtehus (TV series)
- 1985 - Hålet
- 1985 - Examen
- 1986 - Teaterterroristerna
- 1986 - Allt ljus på mig
- 1986 - Vägg i vägg (TV)
- 1986 - Moa
- 1987 - Jim och piraterna Blom
- 1988 - Enkel resa
- 1989 - Slavhandlarna (TV)
- 1990 - Hjälten
- 1991 - Ett paradis utan biljard
- 1991 - Den goda viljan (English: The Best Intentions - TV mini-series)
- 1992 - Vennerman & Winge (TV series))
- 1993 - Macklean (TV series))
- 1994 - Jönssonligans största kupp (English: The Jönsson Gang's Greatest Robbery)
- 1995 - Esters testamente (TV series))
- 1997 - Rena rama Rolf
- 1997 - Adam & Eva
- 1999 - Hälsoresan – En smal film av stor vikt (English: The Health Conduct Tour - A Small Film With Great Importance)
- 2002 - Olivia Twist (TV)
- 2006 - LasseMajas detektivbyrå (English: LasseMaja's Detective Agency - TV series)
- 2007 - Darling
- 2008 - LasseMajas detektivbyrå - Kameleontens hämnd
- 2008 - Mañana
- 2008 - Maria Larssons eviga ögonblick (English Everlasting Moments)
- 2009 - Guds tre flickor (TV series)
- 2009 - Wallander - Läckan (TV series)
- 2010 - Kommissarie Winter Rum Nummer 10
- 2011 - Åsa-Nisse - wälkom to Knohult
- 2013 - Halvvägs till himlen (TV series)
- 2015 - Miraklet i Viskan
- 2016 - Springfloden (English: Spring Tide - TV series)
- 2017 - Torpederna (TV series)
- 2022 – Bäckström (TV series)
