= LasseMajas detektivbyrå (TV series) =

- Genre: children
- Created by: Martin Widmark; Helena Willis
- Starring: Teodor Runsiö; Matilda Grahn; Tomas Norström
- Country of origin: Sweden
- Original language: Swedish
- No. of seasons: 1
- No. of episodes: 24

Production
- Production company: SVT

Original release
- Network: SVT1
- Release: 1 December – 24 December 2006

Related
- En decemberdröm (2005); En riktig jul (2007)

LasseMajas detektivbyrå ("LasseMaja's Detective Agency") is the 2006 SVT Christmas calendar broadcast 1–24 December 2006 in Sveriges Television. The TV series, which was based on the book series LasseMajas detektivbyrå by Martin Widmark and Helena Willis, takes place in Lasse's and Maja's home town Valleby. It was recorded in Sveriges Television studios during the spring of 2006.

== Characters ==
=== Lasse and Maja ===
Lasse and Maja, played by Teodor Runsiö and Matilda Grahn, are 2 of the 3 main characters. They are two ~10 years old detectives who have known each other since they were small, and they have an own detective agency called LasseMajas detektivbyrå where they look at proofs etc. and they help the Policemaster of Valleby. Lasse first thinks and investigates problems carefully before he acts and is a little bit "coward". Maja is a little bit restless and acts directly.

Citation: "Okej, nu kör vi, vad har vi?" ("OK, now let's go, what do we have?")

=== Polismästaren ===
The Policemaster (Polismästaren in Swedish) of Valleby, played by Tomas Norström, is the 3rd main character. He has worked as policemaster for about 23 years and has never worked with any crime. This Christmas he wants to direct and write a Christmas theatre play for remembering his parents, but many crimes are committed during the directing-time, but Lasse and Maja, who are his "assistants", help him.

=== Solskensorkestern ===
Solskensorkestern (Sunshine Orchestra) is an orchestra, playing the music of the songs in Polismästaren's play. But they think Polismästaren is "stupid" and want to finish and move to Trelleborg and play there instead but they regret it. The members of the orchestra are:

- Ingeborg (oboe and saxophone), played by Maria Langhammer
- Svenborg (piano), played by Wallis Grahn
- Gunborg (cello), played by Maria Sundbom

=== Prästen ===
Prästen (The Priest), played by Pia Johansson, lives alone in the church of Valleby. She really wants to participate in Polismästaren's Christmas play but he never has time to speak to her and in the 23rd program she kidnaps him. But he doesn't arrest her, instead he allows her to play Jesus in the play.

=== Sally Solo ===
Sally Solo, played by Veronica Dahlström, is a journalist, working at Valleby-bladet ("Valleby News"). He appears in many programs and interviews people.

=== Steve Marsaan and Ulla Bernhard ===
Steve Marsaan, played by Christer Fant, owns Café Marsaan. He really hates cold weather and dreams about moving to a hot country. He and Ulla Bernhard becomes arrested for robbery of his café. Ulla Bernhard (played by Annette Stenson-Fjordefalk) is chief of the café. She was going to play an angel in the Christmas play until she was arrested for robbery of the café. Polismästaren loved her until he arrested her.

=== Dino Panini and Sara Bernhard ===
Dino Panini and Sara Bernhard, played by Robin Keller and Emelie Rosenqvist, are good friends who take over Café Marsaan when Steve and Ulla are arrested. Dino has problem with speak properly. He plays Jesus' father in the Christmas play. Sara loves dogs.

=== Barbro Palm ===
Barbro Palm (played by Margareta Stone) is chief of the museum. In the beginning she's bad. She plays an arecaceae in the Christmas play. She loves Muhammed Karat and marries him in the following film LasseMajas detektivbyrå – Kameleontens hämnd.

=== Krister Lönn ===
Krister Lönn, played by Michael Segerström, is night-guard at the museum. He handles the lighting of the theatre.

=== Cornelia ===
Cornelia, played by Charlott Strandberg, is cleaner of the museum.

=== Pernilla ===
Pernilla (played by Charlotta Åkerblom) is studying skincare-therapy but she also works as cashier at the museum.

=== Muhammed Karat ===
Muhammed Karat, played by Hassan Brijany, is jeweller and has an own shop. He's the only one in the whole world who has two diamonds which are exactly identical to each other. In the following film LasseMajas detektivbyrå – Kameleontens hämnd he marries Barbro Palm.

=== Lollo Smith ===
Lollo Smith, played by Jonas Karlsson, is a "sprätthök" ("spatting-hawk") who makes jewellery in Muhammed Karat's shop. He often brags that he earned money from his father. He likes jogging and he likes eating Granny Smith-apples.

=== Siv Leander ===
Siv Leander, played by Rachel Mohlin, works in Muhammed Karat's shop. She plays Jesus' mother in the Christmas play.

=== Trollande Tore and Pyro Pecka ===
Trollande Tore (Conjuring Tore), played by Morgan Alling, has a wheel of Fortune at the Christmas Market. He claims that he can draw gold-lots, but it is not gold; it is plastics with gold-colour. Pyro Pecka (played by Simon Norrthon) is knife-thrower at the Christmas market.

=== Margareta ===
Margareta (played by Anna-Carin Franzén) has a chocolate-wheel at the Christmas market, but instead of chocolate she gives the winners carrots because "det är nyttigare" ("it's more nutritious").

=== Korv-Kalle ===
Korv-Kalle ("Sausage-Kalle", played by Thomas Olofsson) sells hot dogs (sausages-with-bread) at the Christmas market.

=== Isprinsessan and Pappa Björn ===
Sofia or Isprinsessan ("The Ice Princess"), played by Amy Diamond, is figure skater at the Christmas market together with his father Björn (played by Nils Moritz) who was dressed-up as a bear at the performances. Isprinsessan has a little monkey called Sylvester. In the Christmas play Isprinsessan handles a fog machine and plays an angel. Björn plays a camel in the Christmas play and in the end he receives a job as theatre director by Polismästaren.

=== Frank Franksson and Jonas Boklund ===
Frank Franksson (played by Jacob Ericksson) is a well-known author who returns to his former home town Valleby for reading his new novel Kärlek på Prärien. Since he was 7 years old he has been friend with Jonas Boklund (Johan Ulveson), who owns a book shop and loved reading as young, but suddenly they become angry to each other. In the end Lasse and Maja know that Jonas has written the books which they claimed were written by Frank.

=== Ronny Hazelwood ===
Ronny Hazelwood, played by Johan Rheborg, owns the hotel of Valleby. His hotel business has been bad so he owes 200,000 SEK, but in the end he sells a postage stamp he earned from his father and can pay it.

=== Åkerö family ===
The Åkerö family (played by Peter Dalle, Ann Petrén and Joy Linnér Klackenberg) are a rich family who rent a room in the hotel. Suddenly their little dog Ribston disappears, but in the end Lasse and Maja know that they claimed that he disappeared so Ronny Hazelwood was forced to owe them money. When the Åkerö family are arrested for scam, Sara Bernhard keeps Ribston.

=== Pierre Chaloppes and Riita ===
Pierre Chaloppes (played by Özz Nûjen) works as bellhop at the hotel. He has hard dog-allergy. Riita (played by Ellen Mattsson), who is the hotel's chef, helps him with his allergy.

=== Hammar and Rutger Björkhage ===
Hammar (played by Carl-Magnus Dellow) is director of the bank of Valleby. Together with his college Rutger Björkhage (played by Anders Andersson), who won Olympics-gold-medal in gymnastics 1960, he tried to stole the gold of the bank.

=== Maria de La Cruz ===
Maria de La Cruz, played by Alexandra Rapaport, is security-chief of the bank.

== Plot ==
=== Part 1–4 ===
Lasse, Maja and Polismästaren have to capture someone who has robbed Café Marsaan.

Committed by: Steve Marsaan (owner) and Ulla Bernhard (chief of the café). Steve claimed that he and Ulla were going to open a new café in Saint-Tropez, but actually he wanted to steal enough money for buying a boat for sailing in the Mediterranean Sea.

=== Part 4–7 ===
When a mummy comes to the museum, a picture is stolen. The chief receives a letter where someone forces her to pay or he/she will steal more pictures.

Committed by: Cornelia (cleaner of the museum). She wanted to swear revenge to the new "bad" chief of the museum Barbro Palm and dressed-up as mummy and stole the picture.

=== Part 7–10 ===
Muhammed Karat's two diamonds are stolen.

Committed by: Lollo Smith. He earned money from his father but the diamonds were not for sale. He cut a hole in an apple, put the diamond in the hole, dropped the apple in a rain gutter, took it when he stopped there for stretching during his jogging-time and after that he posted the diamond.

=== Part 10–13 ===
Lasse and Maja take a brake from their "detective-work" and go to a Christmas market in Valleby. When they go to Isprinsessan's and her father Björn's figure skating performance, they, and also other people, get their wallets stolen.

Committed by: Isprinsessan. She was tired with moving around and wanted to use the stolen money for paying for staying in Valleby. She learnt her little monkey Sylvester to go around and take people's wallets. But Polismästaren didn't arrest her because in the end she left the wallets back to the people. Instead he allowed Isprinsessan to handle a fog machine and play an angel in the Christmas play.

=== Part 13–16 ===
A well-known author, Frank Franksson, returns to his former home town Valleby for reading his new book Kärlek på Prärien. Suddenly he and his friend Jonas Boklund, the owner of the book shop of Valleby, become angry to each other. When Frank reads the book, he stops before the end; the end has been "stolen".

Committed by: No one committed some crime. Frank and Jonas were working "together"; Jonas wrote the books they claimed that Frank was the author of the books so they could make a better business. They promised that they should betray their secret after 10 books but Frank regretted it when he came to Valleby and then Jonas refused to give him the end of Kärlek på Prärien.

=== Part 16–19 ===
One day the rich Åkerö family rent a room in Ronny Hazelwood's hotel. The next day their dog Ribston disappears and they require Ronny to pay them the worth of the dog; 200 000 SEK. Ronny becomes suspected, and even Pierre, the bellhop of the hotel, who has dog-allergy and refuses to work more if the dogs stays there.

Committed by: The Åkerö family. Every time they travelled to hotels and changed name and claimed that the dog disappeared so they could require the hotel owners to pay.

=== Part 19–21 ===
The Swedish gold is put in the bank vault in the bank of Valleby. The day when it is going to be transported to Stockholm, it's stolen, despite to the very advanced security system (which included laser flashes).

Committed by: Hammar, the bank director and his college Rutger Björkhage. Rutger, who won Olympics-gold-medal in gymnastics as young, could easily press himself into the gold box where he was hidden. At the night he put the gold bars in soap so they could "ski" through the floor under the laser flashes towards the door where Hammar took them. After throwing all of the gold bars, Rutger used his gymnastic-methods for going through the lasers.

=== Part 22–24 ===
Someone sends a cake to the theatre which Solskensorkestern and Muhammed Karat eat. Later they are ill and can't participate in the Christmas play but they get medicine. It's the first time Polismästaren visits LasseMajas detektivbyrå and when he goes away home someone kidnaps him.

Committed by: Prästen. Every day during December she tried to talk to Polismästaren, trying to ask for participating in the Christmas play, but he couldn't any time and then she took him to the church. Lasse and Maja caught her but Polismästaren ordered them to let her go and he let her to play Jesus in the Christmas play.

== See also ==
- List of Christmas films
