= Alexander Karim =

Swedish actor and writer (born 1976)

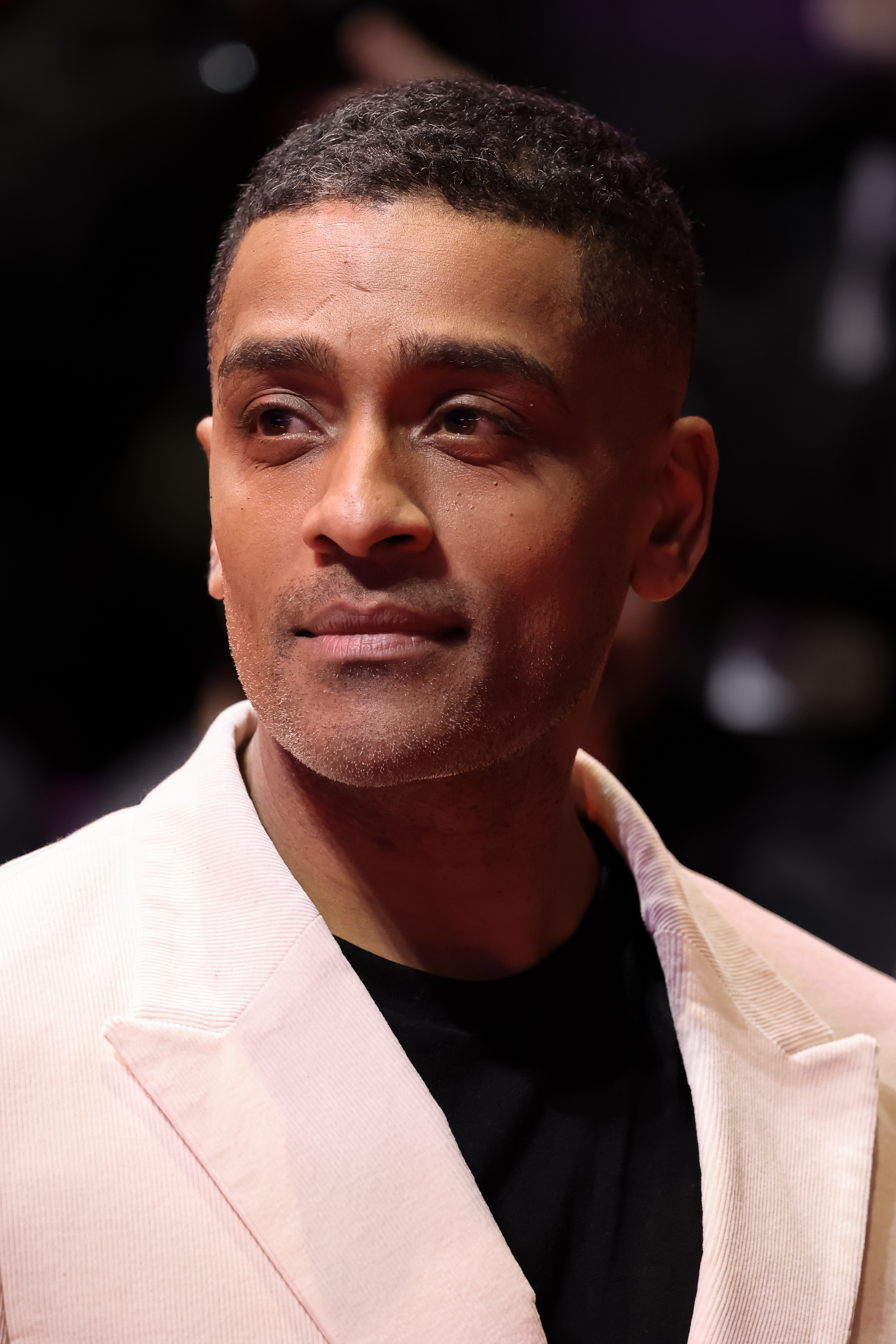
- Karim in 2023
- Born: Ally Kimbugwe Karim; 26 May 1976 (age 50); Uppsala, Sweden
- Occupations: Actor; writer
- Children: 3
- Relatives: Othman Karim (brother)

Alexander Ally Karim (born Ally Kimbugwe Karim; 26 May 1976) is a Swedish actor and writer. His role as Frank Nordling in the Viaplay/TV3 series The Lawyer (Advokaten) earned him a Kristallen nomination for Best Actor in 2018.

He is also known for his roles as Dr. Sigur Johanson in The Swarm, and as Ihab Rashid in FX's Tyrant.

== Background ==
Karim was born Ally Kimbugwe Karim on 26 May 1976 in Uppsala, Sweden to a family of refugees from Uganda who came to Sweden in 1975 to escape despotic president Idi Amin. He has two brothers: director Othman "Osmond" Karim and director Baker Karim.

Karim is married with three children.

== Career ==
After completing high school, he moved, as well as his brothers before him, to the United States and Los Angeles City College, where they all trained as actors. He later worked at The Hudson Theater in the same city. In 2000, Karim moved back to Sweden and started working in film. In his first movie from the same year, the short film Rampljus (Stage Lights), which is about an unemployed actor in Helsingborg, he collaborated with his brother Baker. The film was a great success and won the best film in the category "heavyweight" at the November festival in Trollhättan.

Alexander Karim in 2026

In the jury in Trollhättan was Lukas Moodysson. Together with Lars von Trier they contacted the brothers Karim, who played in their biofilm Fyra kvinnor (2001), written and directed by Baker Karim. Shortly after this, Alexander Karim played the title role in Malcolm (2002), to which he also wrote a script. The same year he also participated as Amir in the short film Tompta Gudh. Malcolm won both the audience prize and the jury prize at the Gothenburg Film Festival 2002, was nominated for a Guldbagge Awards, and was nominated on the critic week in Cannes. Also Karim's next movie The Apple Tree (2003), which is about two African brothers struggling in chilly Sweden, was nominated in Cannes. In 2005 he participated in his brother Osmond's film Om Sara and 2006 in Amir Chamdin's Om Gud vill.

Karim has also participated in several TV series, including Orka! Orka! (2004), En decemberdröm (2005), Lasermannen (2006) and Andra Avenyn (2007). In 2009 he participated in the autobiographical SVT series about the family Babajou, which he also scripted together with his brother Baker. He was also included in the 2006 set at the Fredriksdalsteatern in Herrskap och tjänstehjon where he played Florindo Al Dente in the 19th century Venice.

He played Vanheden in the reboot of Jönssonligan 2015, called Jönssonligan – Den perfekta stöten.

Karim has starred in television series such as SVT's Äkta människor, TV3's Advokaten, and FX's Tyrant. He has also had roles in films such as the Johan Falk series, Double Play, Dying of the Light, and Zero Dark Thirty. In 2019, Karim was a celebrity guest on Stjärnorna på slottet, where he spoke about his life and career.

In 2019, Karim published his first book, novel Den extraordinära berättelsen om Jonas Paulssons plötsliga död, followed by a children's book called Modigast i världen, which he co-wrote with his wife, Malin Karim. In June 2021, Karim and best-selling author Camilla Läckberg released an audiobook based on their co-written script Glacier. The story has also been adapted into a film starring Karim and Lena Endre and directed by Baker Karim.

== Filmography ==
=== Television ===
Year	Title	Role	Other notes	Ref.
2004–2005	Orka! Orka!	Kenny	2 episodes	
2005	Lasermannen	Beraki	2 episodes	
2005	En decemberdröm	Vaktis	7 episodes	
2006	Tatort	Bartender	Episode "Mann über Bord"	
2006	Poliser	Roger Zettman	Episode "#1.5"	
2007	Andra Avenyn	Fredrik Fersen	8 episodes	
2009	Familjen Babajou	Pappa	2 episodes	
2010	Vid vintergatans slut	Crona	2 episodes	
2012	The Last Weekend	Milo	3 episodes	
2013	Skrotarna	Zapp Mysko		
2013–2014	Äkta människor	Douglas	7 episodes	
2014	Söder om Folkungagatan	Mårten	4 episodes	
2015	Arne Dahl: En midsommarnattsdröm	Bengt Åkesson	2 episodes	
2015	Arne Dahl: Dödsmässa	Bengt Åkesson	2 episodes	
2015	Arne Dahl: Mörkertal	Bengt Åkesson	2 episodes	
2014–2016	Tyrant	Ihab Rashid	30 episodes	
2018	The Sandhamn Murders	Carsten	Episode "I maktens skugga"	
2020	Thin Ice	Viktor Baker	6 episodes	
2020	We Got This	Alex	6 episodes	
2018–2020	Advokaten	Frank Nordling	18 episodes	
2019–2020	Bröllop, begravning & dop	Schiff	5 episodes	
2020	Lyckoviken	Niklas	2 episodes	
2020	LasseMajas detektivbyrå	Jean Pierre	Episode "Modemysteriet"	
2021	The Box	Detective Thomas Lovell	7 episodes	
2021–2023	The Wheel of Time	Lews Therin Telamon	2 episodes	
2023	Maternal	Lars Nordström	ITV drama	
2023	The Swarm	Sigur Johanson	8 episodes	
2026	Below	Dr. Sayeed	2 episodes	

=== Film ===
Year	Original title	Title in English	Role	Director	Ref.
2001	Fyra kvinnor	Four Women	Alexander	Baker Karim	
2002	Malcolm	Malcolm	Malcolm	Baker Karim	
2002	Tompta Gudh		Amir	Ted Kjellsson	
2002	Capricciosa		Kamal	Reza Bagher	
2005	Om Sara	About Sara	Pelle	Osmond Karim	
2005	Det odödliga	Fragments of an Unfinished Journey	Adrian	Baker Karim	
2006	Om Gud vill	God Willing	Mohammed	Amir Chamdin and Erik Eger	
2006	Herrskap och tjänstehjon			Jan Hertz	
2006	Du & jag	Du & jag	Annas kille Steve	Emil Larsson and Martin Jern	
2008	Det som ingen ved	What No One Knows		Søren Kragh-Jacobsen	
2009	Äntligen midsommar!	A Midsummer Comedy	Micke	Ian McCrudden	
2011	Varg Veum - Svarte får	Black Sheep	Alexander Latoor	Stephan Apelgren	
2012	Johan Falk: Spelets regler	Rules of the Game	Niklas Saxlid	Charlotte Brändström	
2012	Johan Falk: De 107 patrioterna	The 107 Patriots	Niklas Saxlid	Anders Nilsson	
2012	Johan Falk: Alla råns moder	Mother of All Roberies	Niklas Saxlid	Anders Nilsson	
2012	Johan Falk: Organizatsija Karayan		Niklas Saxlid	Richard Holm	
2012	Johan Falk: Barninfiltratören	The Child Infiltrator	Niklas Saxlid	Richard Holm	
2012	Johan Falk: Kodnamn: Lisa	Codename Lisa	Niklas Saxlid	Charlotte Brändström	
2012		Zero Dark Thirty	Detainee on Monitor	Kathryn Bigelow	
2013	För Sverige i tiden		Markus	Jonas Westbom	
2013	Passagerare		Sila	Mathew Moore	
2013	Lev stærkt	On the Edge	Jobbe	Christian E. Christiansen	
2014	Allt vi delar		Samir	Jerry Carlsson	
2014		Dying of the Light	Muhammad Banir	Paul Schrader	
2014	Jönssonligan - Den perfekta stöten	The Master Plan	Ragnar Vanheden	Alain Darborg	
2015	Beginning of the End	Beginning of the End	Kristof	Olof Spaak	
2015	Johan Falk: Tyst diplomati	Silent Diplomacy	Niklas Saxlid	Peter Lindmark	
2015	Johan Falk: Blodsdiamanter	Blood Diamonds	Niklas Saxlid	Peter Lindmark	
2015	Johan Falk: Lockdown	Lockdown	Niklas Saxlid	Richard Holm	
2015	Johan Falk: Slutet	The End	Niklas Saxlid	Richard Holm	
2016	The Box	The Box	Douge	Leo Josefsson	
2017	Double Play	Double Play	Bubu	Ernest Dickerson	
2018	The Mission	The Mission	Justin Anahmi	Michael Offer	
2019	Ring mamma!	Call Mom!	Alex	Lisa Aschan	
2021	Jordbundna	Earthbound	Max	Baker Karim	
2021	Glaciär	Glacier	Erik	Baker Karim	
2021	Bröllop, begravning och dop - Filmen		Schiff	Colin Nutley	
2021	The Woman Under the Bed	The Woman Under the Bed	Ferris	Robin Sherlock Holm	
2024	Gladiator II	Gladiator II	Ravi	Ridley Scott	

== Bibliography ==
- 2019 - Den extraordinära berättelsen om Jonas Paulssons plötsliga ISBN 9789113086903
- 2019 - Modigast i världen ISBN 9789178034604
