= Rosenqvist =

Rosenqvist is a Swedish surname meaning "rose branch".

== Geographical distribution ==
As of 2014, 64.1% of all known bearers of the surname Rosenqvist were residents of Sweden (frequency 1:4,169), 22.3% of Finland (1:6,671), 9.6% of Denmark (1:15,900) and 1.4% of Norway (1:97,025).

In Sweden, the frequency of the surname was higher than national average (1:4,169) in the following counties:

1. Kalmar County (1:1,804)
2. Skåne County (1:2,039)
3. Kronoberg County (1:2,363)
4. Jönköping County (1:2,796)
5. Blekinge County (1:3,142)
6. Östergötland County (1:3,392)
7. Gävleborg County (1:3,685)
8. Gotland County (1:3,899)

In Finland, the frequency of the surname was higher than national average (1:6,671) in the following regions:

1. Åland (1:587)
2. Satakunta (1:1,750)
3. Southwest Finland (1:3,393)
4. Uusimaa (1:4,638)
5. Ostrobothnia (1:5,607)

== People ==
- Edil Rosenqvist, Finnish wrestler
- Einar Rosenqvist, Norwegian naval officer and politician
- Emelie Rosenqvist (born 1980), Swedish actress
- Ernst Rosenqvist, Finnish sports shooter
- Felix Rosenqvist, Swedish racing driver, Indianapolis 500 winner
- Gustaf Allan Rosenqvist, Finnish businessman and co-founder of Andrée & Rosenqvist
- Helena Hillar Rosenqvist, Swedish politician
- Susanne Rosenqvist, Swedish sprint canoeist
- Terkel Rosenqvist, Norwegian chemist and metallurgist

== See also ==
- Rosenquist
