= Norrthon =

Norrthon is a surname. Notable people with the surname include:

- Henrik Norrthon (born 1979), Swedish Director
- Simon Norrthon (born 1967), Swedish actor
