= Jens Harzer =

German actor (born 1972)

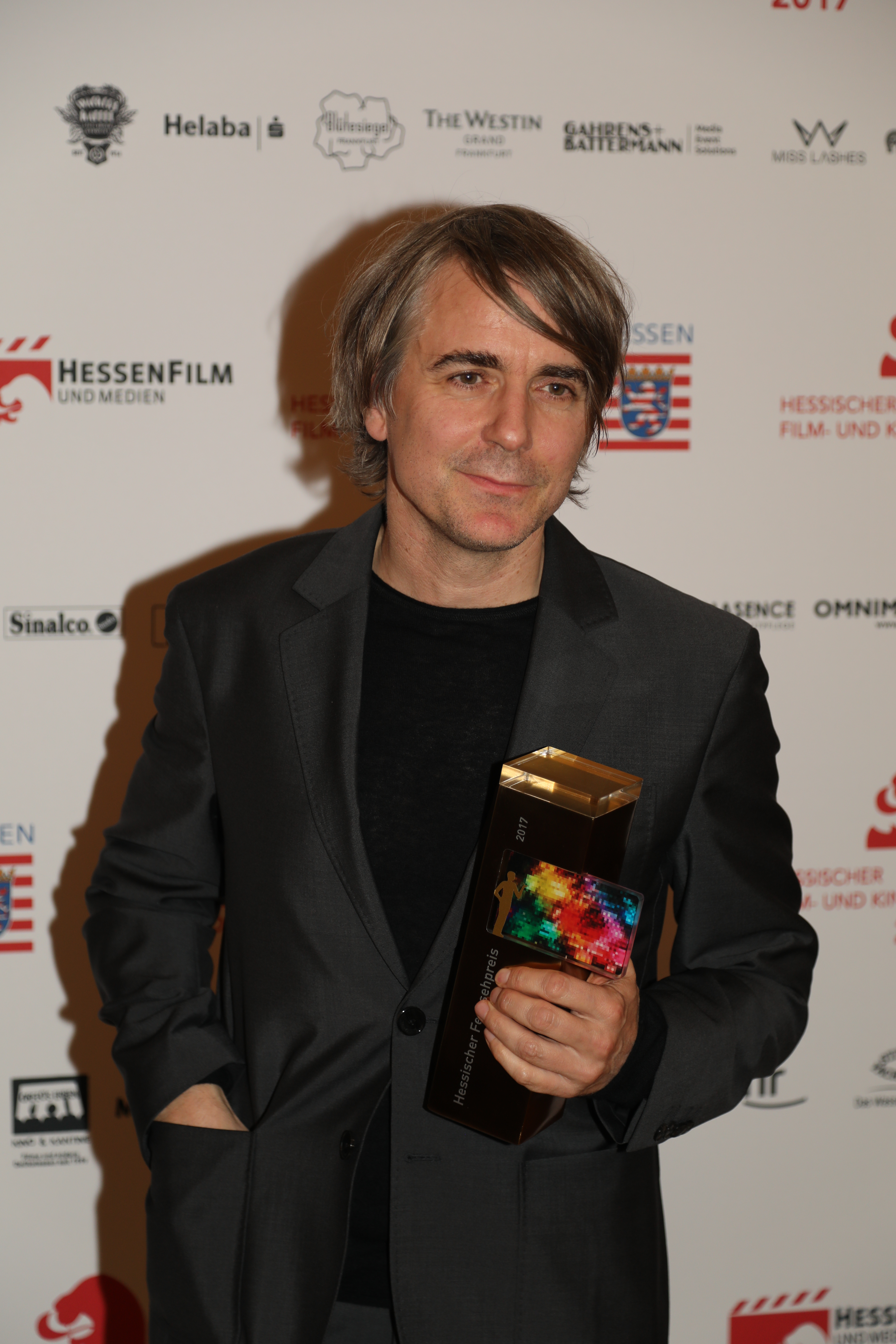
- Harzer in 2017
- Born: 14 March 1972 (age 54); Wiesbaden, West Germany
- Education: Otto Falckenberg School of the Performing Arts
- Occupation: Actor
- Years active: 1995–present
- Organizations: Munich Kammerspiele; Salzburg Festival; Thalia Theatre
- Awards: Iffland-Ring

Jens Harzer (born 14 March 1972) is a German stage, film, and television actor. He began his career at the Munich Kammerspiele, and has been a member of the Thalia Theatre in Hamburg since 2009. He has appeared at the Salzburg Festival regularly since 2000. Harzer received prizes for roles on stage, in film and on television. He has been the bearer of the Iffland-Ring since March 2019.

== Career ==
Born in Wiesbaden, he was trained as an actor at the Otto Falckenberg School of the Performing Arts in Munich. From 1993 to 2009 he was a member of the ensemble of Dieter Dorn, first at the Munich Kammerspiele and then at the Bayerisches Staatsschauspiel. He played the title roles of Roberto Zucco by Bernard-Marie Koltès, staged by Christian Stückl, Goethe's Urfaust and Torquato Tasso, Kleist's Amphitryon and Büchner's Woyzeck, staged by Martin Kušej. Harzer has been a member of the Thalia Theatre in Hamburg since 2009.

Since 2000, Harzer has been a regular guest at the Salzburg Festival. Again in a production staged by Stückl, he played the role of Death in Hofmannsthal's Jedermann. In 2008 there, Harzer played the leading role in a staged version of Dostoevsky's Verbrechen und Strafe, staged by Andrea Breth. In 2011, he played the role of Ich in the world premiere of Peter Handke's Immer noch Sturm at the Festival.

Harzer has appeared in 15 films since 1995. At the 56th Berlin International Film Festival in 2006, he performed in two films, Requiem by Hans-Christian Schmid and, in the title role, the drama Der Lebensversicherer by Bülent Akıncı. He won the Silver George for Best Actor at the 28th Moscow International Film Festival for the latter film.

Harzer was named by Bruno Ganz to be his successor as bearer of the Republic of Austria's Iffland-Ring, traditionally bestowed upon the "most significant and most worthy actor of the German-speaking theatre" in the opinion of the previous bearer. Harzer was awarded the ring in a ceremony at the Burgtheater in June 2019, four months after Ganz's death.

== Awards ==
Harzer has received several awards, including:

- 1996: Bayerischer Kunstförderpreis in the category Performing Art
- 1996: Berliner Kunstpreis of the Akademie der Künste (Förderpreis)
- 2003: Kurt-Meisel-Preis for excellent acting, by the association Verein der Freunde des Bayrischen Staatsschauspiels
- 2006: Silver George of the Moscow International Film Festival as Best actor for Der Lebensversicherer
- 2008: Actor of the Year, critics' selection by Theater heute, for Onkel Wanja
- 2011: Actor of the year, for Don Carlos
- 2015: Theaterpreis Hamburg – Rolf Mares for the role Friedrich Wetter Graf vom Strahl in Das Käthchen von Heilbronn at the Thalia Theater
- 2017: Hessischer Fernsehpreis for Tatort Amour Fou
- 2019: Iffland-Ring

== Memberships ==
- 2005 Member of the Bayerische Akademie der Schönen Künste
- 2012 Member of the Freie Akademie der Künste Hamburg
- 2013 Member of the Akademie der Künste Berlin

== Filmography ==
Films with Harzer have included:

- Hades (1995)
- Der Lebensversicherer (2006)
- Requiem (2006)
- Same Same but Different (2009)
- Boy 7 (2015)
- The Beautiful Days of Aranjuez (2016)
- Long Live Death (Tatort: Es lebe der Tod) (2016)
- Babylon Berlin (2017)
- Tatort: Alles kommt zurück (2021)
- Hallo Spencer – Der Film (2024)
