= 28th Moscow International Film Festival =

Film festival

- Location: Moscow, Russia
- Founded: 1959
- Awards: Grand Prix
- Festival date: 23 June – 2 July 2006
- Website: www.moscowfilmfestival.ru

The 28th Moscow International Film Festival was held from 23 June to 2 July 2006. The Golden George was awarded to the Swedish film About Sara directed by Othman Karim.

== Jury ==
- Andrzej Żuławski (Poland – Head of the Jury)
- Alexei Uchitel (Russia)
- Rémy Girard (Canada)
- Pierre-Henri Deleau (France)
- Julie Christie (United Kingdom)

== Films in competition ==
The following films were selected for the main competition:

English title	Original title	Director(s)	Production country
More Than Anything in the World	Más que a nada en el mundo	Andrés León Becker, Javier Solar	Mexico
The Bet Collector	Kubrador	Jeffrey Jeturian	Philippines
Mr. Average	Comme tout le monde	Pierre-Paul Renders	Belgium
Klimt	Klimt	Raúl Ruiz	Austria, Germany, France, Great Britain
Who Never Lived	Kto nigdy nie żył...	Andrzej Seweryn	Poland
Ice on Fire	La fiamma sul ghiaccio	Umberto Marino	Italy
About Sara	Om Sara	Othman Karim	Sweden
Love & Dance	Sipur Hatzi-Russi	Eitan Anner	Israel
The Wake	Agrypnia	Nikos Grammatikos	Greece
Relatives	Rokonok	István Szabó	Hungary
The Samurai I Loved	Semishigure	Mitsuo Kurotsuchi	Japan
How Much Do You Love Me?	Combien tu m’aimes?	Bertrand Blier	France
Sleep Sweet, My Darling	Snivaj, Zlato Moje	Neven Hitrec	Croatia
Ask the Dust	Ask the Dust	Robert Towne	United States
Running on Empty	Der Lebensversicherer	Bülent Akinci	Germany
Driving Lessons	Driving Lessons	Jeremy Brock	United Kingdom
Worm	Cherv	Aleksei Muradov	Russia

== Awards ==
- Golden George: About Sara by Othman Karim
- Special Jury Prize: Silver George: Driving Lessons by Jeremy Brock
- Silver George:
  - Best Director: Bertrand Blier for How Much Do You Love Me?
  - Best Actor: Jens Harzer for Running on Empty
  - Best Actress: Julie Walters for Driving Lessons
- Silver George for the best film of the Perspective competition: Chasma by Yolkin Tuychiev
- Lifetime Achievement Award: Chen Kaige
- Stanislavsky Award: Gérard Depardieu
