= Dear Alice =

2010 Swedish drama film

- Directed by: Othman Karim
- Written by: Othman Karim; Grace Maharaj-Eriksson
- Produced by: Malin Holmberg-Karim; Hans Lönnerheden
- Starring: Danny Glover; Tuva Novotny; Stefan Sauk; Regina Lund; Ulf Brunnberg; Peter Gardiner; Moses Said
- Cinematography: Esa Vuorinen
- Edited by: Katarina Duske; Darek Hodor
- Distributed by: Nordisk Film
- Release date: 7 July 2010
- Running time: 120 minutes
- Country: Sweden
- Languages: Swedish; English

Dear Alice (Swedish: För kärleken) is a 2010 Swedish drama film directed by Othman Karim starring Danny Glover, Tuva Novotny and Peter Gardiner. The film is written by Karim and Grace Maharaj-Eriksson.

Dear Alice competed at the 2010 Moscow Film Festival.

== Plot ==
Very different lives, becomes interweaved during what seems like an ordinary day. Franzis Namazi (Danny Glover) is a newly arrived immigrant from Gambia to Sweden. He is about to give up on his little store selling African art. Karin Carlsson-Said (Tuva Novotny) is a lawyer who is about to enter a new important step in her career as a lawyer. Her husband Moses (Peter Gardiner) must send money to his hospitalized father in Uganda, but there are problems with the transaction and has issues with keeping up his work as a Social Worker. Bosse (Ulf Brunnberg) is the TV star who finds out he has been fired off his own show and finds his young wife with another man, Håkan (Stefan Sauk) is a charming celebrity with an alcohol problem and now once again needs help from his lawyer Karin Carlsson-Said.

== Cast ==
- Danny Glover as Franzis Namazi
- Tuva Novotny as Karin Carlsson-Said
- Stefan Sauk as Håkan Pettersson
- Regina Lund as Elisabeth Krantz
- Ulf Brunnberg as Bosse Krantz
- Peter Gardiner as Moses Said
- Meta Velander as Elsa
