= Imogen Kogge =

German actress

- Born: 8 February 1957 (age 69); West Berlin, West Germany
- Occupation: Actress
- Years active: 1983–present

Imogen Kogge (born 8 February 1957) is a German actress. She has appeared in more than forty films since 1983.

== Selected filmography ==
| Year | Title | Role | Notes |
|---|---|---|---|
| 1999 | Nightshapes | | |
| 2005 | Barfuss | | |
| 2006 | Requiem | | |
| 2011 | If Not Us, Who? | | |
| 2012 | Russian Disco | | |
| 2014 | Phoenix | | |
| 2020 | Merkel: Anatomy of a Crisis | Angela Merkel | |
| 2023 | The Zone of Interest | Linna Hensel | |
