= About Sara =

2005 Swedish film directed by Othman Karim

- Film poster
- Directed by: Othman Karim
- Written by: Petra Revenue; Othman Karim
- Produced by: Malin Holmberg-Karim
- Starring: Linda Zilliacus
- Cinematography: Søren Bay
- Release date: 11 November 2005
- Running time: 108 minutes
- Country: Sweden
- Language: Swedish

About Sara (Swedish: Om Sara) is a 2005 Swedish drama film directed by Othman Karim. It won the Golden George at the 28th Moscow International Film Festival. The film is Karim's feature debut.

== Cast ==
- Linda Zilliacus as Sara
- Alexander Skarsgård as Kalle Öberg
- Hugo Emretsson as Stefan
- Alexander Karim as Pelle
- Siw Erixon as Saras mamma
- Eva Rydberg as Kalles mamma
