= The Samurai I Loved =

2005 film

- DVD cover
- Directed by: Mitsuo Kurotsuchi
- Written by: Shûhei Fujisawa; Mitsuo Kurotsuchi
- Produced by: Toshiaki Nakazawa
- Starring: Ichikawa Somegorō VII
- Release date: 1 October 2005 (Japan)
- Running time: 131 minutes
- Country: Japan
- Language: Japanese

The Samurai I Loved (Japanese: 蝉しぐれ, Hepburn: Semishigure) is a 2005 Japanese drama film directed by Mitsuo Kurotsuchi. It was entered into the 28th Moscow International Film Festival.

== Cast ==
- Ichikawa Somegorō VII as Maki
- Yoshino Kimura as Fuku
- Koji Imada as Shimazaki Yonosuke
- Ryo Fukawa as Kowada Ippei
- Mieko Harada as Tose
- Ken Ogata as Maki Sukezaemon
- Takuya Ishida
- Aimi Satsukawa as Fuku, childhood
- Masahiro Hisano
- Yukihiro Iwabuchi
- Ryō Tamura
