= Linda Zilliacus =

Swedish-speaking Finnish actor (born 1977)

Linda Elvira Zilliacus (née Gyllenberg; born 1977 in Helsinki) is a Swedish-speaking Finnish actress and director. She became the director of Wasa Theatre in 2025.

Linda Elvira Gyllenberg was born in 1977. She has two sisters, including Matilda Gyllenberg. She is from Kokkola.

She played the titular role in About Sara (2006), which won Best Film at the 28th Moscow International Film Festival.

She played Siri von Essen in August.

She and her husband Tobias Zilliacus have three children.

== Acting credits ==
=== Film ===
Year	Title	Role	Notes	Ref.
2003	Evil			
2006	About Sara			
2021	Yellow Sulphur Sky	Stella Rabell		

=== Television ===
Year	Title	Role	Notes	Ref.
2007	August	Siri von Essen		
2016	Thicker Than Water	Laura Nord	Season 2	
2021	Moscow Noir			
