= Othman Karim =

Swedish film director

Osmond Karim
- Born: Othman Karim; 19 March 1968 (age 57); Kampala, Uganda
- Spouse: Malin Holmberg-Karim
- Children: 4
- Relatives: Alexander Karim, Baker Karim

Othman "Osmond" Karim (born 19 March 1968) is a Swedish film director, documentary producer, television presenter and photographer.

== Background ==
Karim was born in Kampala, Uganda on March 19, 1968. In 1975, he, his parents, and his four siblings fled Idi Admin's regime and settled in first in Uppsala, then in Skåne. His brother Baker is a director in his own right; brother Alexander and one of their sisters are actors.

He graduated from the Brooks Institute of Photography in California with a BA with honors in Film and TV Production and worked for Amblin Entertainment before returning to Sweden.

He is married to film producer Malin Holmberg-Karim; they have four children.

== Career ==
He hosted the Swedish news program Mosaik from 2000-2002 before leaving to focus on his directing career and production company One Tired Brother. His 1999 documentary Uganda du Fria (The Promised Land) was met with critical acclaim; Sveriges Television submitted it to Prix Europa in 2001. In 2006, Karim's first feature film, Om Sara, won the Golden St. George Prize for Best Film at the 28th Moscow International Film Festival. Shortly after, it was awarded a Viewer's Choice award at the Kolkata International Film Festival. Danny Glover was cast in his 2010 film För kärleken, which garnered a lot of interest.

He served as a member of the jury at the 29th Moscow International Film Festival and Nordisk Panorama Film Festival in 2007.

== Filmography ==
Year	Title	Title in English	Director	Writer	Editor	Other notes
1999	Drömmarnas stad		Yes			
1999	Uganda Du Fria	The Promised Land	Yes		Yes	Short film
1999	Ögonblick	Moments	Yes	Yes		Short film
2000	Rampljus				Yes	Short film; also credited as Director of Photography
2001	Tagning Tolken			Yes		Short film
2001	Fyra kvinnor	Four Women				Credited as Executive Producer
2002	Tolken		Yes	Yes	Yes	Short film
2002	Alla bara försvinner	Everybody Just Disappears	Yes	Yes		Co-written and co-directed with Kristina Kjellin, Kajsa Eldin, Pil Maria Gunnarsson, Molly Hartleb, Ted Kjellson, John Lindgren, Kalle Lindgren
2005	Godmoney			Yes		
2005	Det odödliga	Fragments of an Unfinished Journey				Credited as producer
2005	Om Sara	About Sara	Yes	Yes	Yes	
2006	Svenskjävlar	Bloody Swedes	Yes			
2008	Squire Musa		Yes	Yes		
2010	Tusen bilder: Av livets stora och små mirakel	A Thousand Images	Yes			Pictures and music only; also credited as the Director of Photography
2010	För kärleken	Dear Alice	Yes	Yes		Co-written with Grace Maharaj-Eriksson and Linda Aronson
2012	Jepson från the Ark		Yes	Yes		Yes
2014	Raskortet: En film om att vara svart i Sverige	The Race Card	Yes	Yes	Yes	Co-written with Malin Holmberg-Karim; also credited as cinematographer
2018	De ensamma	The Grateful	Yes			Short film

== Awards ==
Year	Film	Award	Award body
2006	Om Sara	Golden St George Moskova	Moscow International Film Festival
2005	Om Sara	Bästa film	Nöjesguiden
2006	Om Sara	Viewer's Choice Calcutta	Kolkata International Film Festival
2007	Squire Musa	Talent Highlight Award	Berlinale
