= Teodor Runsiö =

Swedish child actor (born 1995)

Teodor Erik Zeron Runsiö (born 28 July 1995) is a Swedish child actor, well known for his role as Lasse in LasseMajas detektivbyrå. He has also played among Micke in the 2006 film Kidz in da Hood.
