= Rosenquist =

Rosenquist is a Swedish surname meaning "rose branch". Notable people with the surname include:

- Gustaf Rosenquist (1887–1961), Swedish gymnast
- James Rosenquist (1933–2017), American artist
- Jesse Rosenquist (1899–1966), American police radio dispatcher pioneer

== See also ==
- Rosenqvist
