= Allrams höjdarpaket =

- Genre: children
- Created by: Petter Lennstrand
- Presented by: Allram Eest; Tjet
- Starring: Petter Lennstrand; Gustav Funck; Gustav Lundkvist; Morgan Alling; Björn Carlberg; Sara Denward; Cecilia Olin; Thomas Lundqvist
- Country of origin: Sweden
- Original language: Swedish
- No. of seasons: 1
- No. of episodes: 24

Production
- Production companies: BLA Stockholm; Svensk Filmindustri

Original release
- Network: SVT1
- Release: 1 December – 24 December 2004

Related
- Håkan Bråkan (2003); En decemberdröm (2005)

Allrams höjdarpaket ("Allram's Top-Notch Parcel") is the Sveriges Television's Christmas calendar in 2004.

== Plot ==
The doll Allram Eest presents a Christmas television program, together with his sidekick Tjet, from a Norrland cottage in the Scandinavian Mountains.

== Video ==
The series was released to DVD on 25 November 2005.

== Videogame ==
With the series came a game called Allrams höjdarspel its a game with 25 minigames. You can play a new game every day until Christmas Eve.
