= Peter Gardiner (actor) =

Swedish actor and dancer (born 1968)

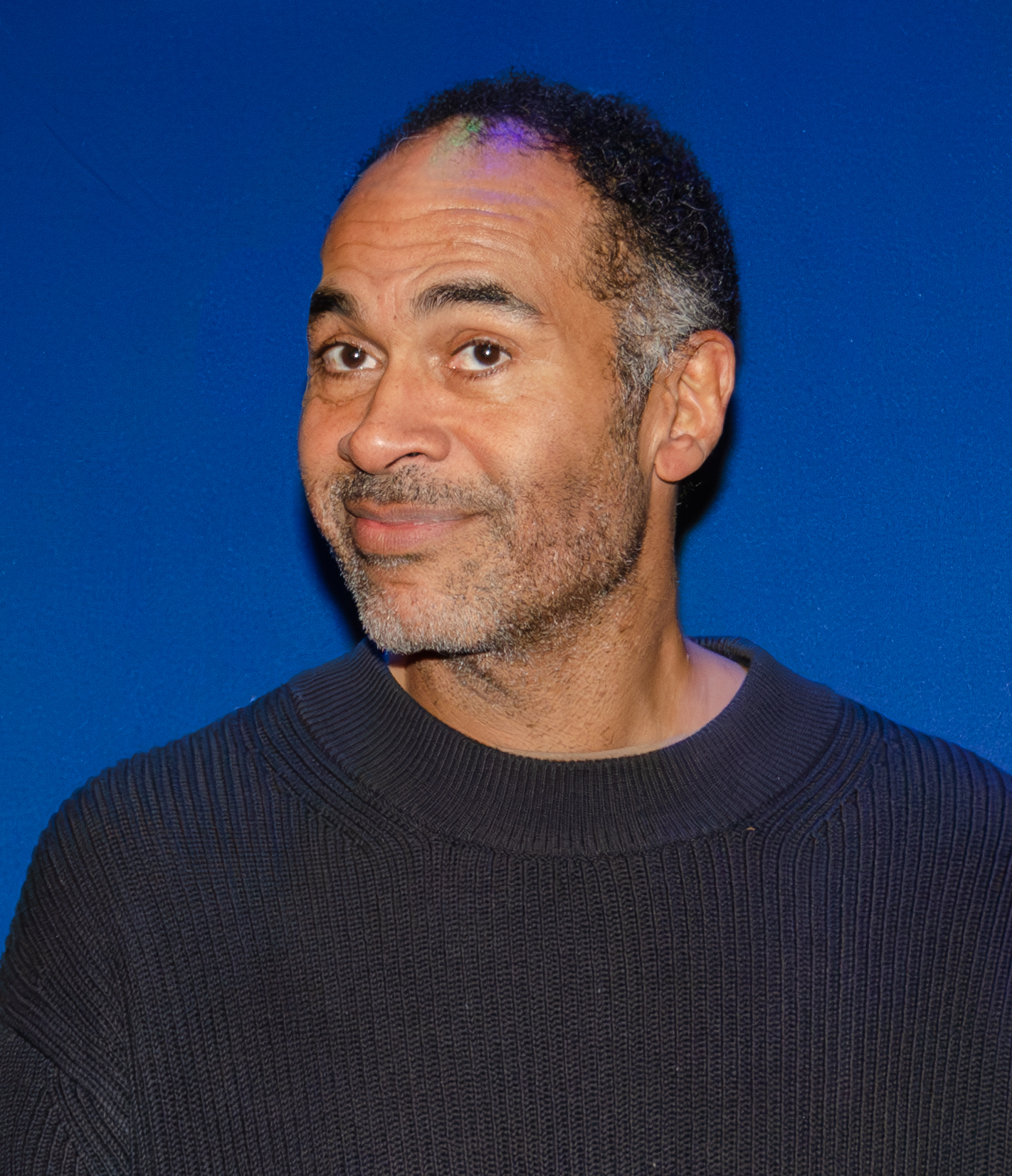
- Gardiner in 2023
- Born: 8 July 1968 (age 57); Uppsala, Sweden
- Years active: 1991–present
- Children: 1

Peter Gardiner (born 8 July 1968) is a Swedish actor and dancer.

== Early life and education ==
Peter Clarence Gardiner was born on 8 July 1968 in Uppsala, Sweden. When he was eleven, he moved to Umeå with his mother.

He received his formal training as a contemporary ballet dancer at Balettakademien in Stockholm from 1988 to 1991.

== Career ==
=== Dance ===
As a dancer, Gardiner has performed at all the large stages in Sweden (Royal Dramatic Theatre, Gothenburg opera house, Uppsala City Theatre, National Swedish Touring Theatre) and at Nye Carte Blanche (Norway) and Isadora Duncan Dance Company (US). u

=== Acting ===
Gardiner also works as an actor. He started with soap operas and teenage dramas, such as Skilda världar and Nudlar och 08:or, and later moved on to larger roles in Swedish movie projects such as The Swimsuit Issue (2008) and Dear Alice (2008), alongside Danny Glover.

He played Mafala in The Book of Mormons, which had its Swedish premiere at Chinateatern on 26 January 2017.

In 2023 he played the role of Christian in the TV crime drama series Fallen (Sanningen). As of 8 July 2023, he had been a member of the permanent ensemble at Stockholm City Theatre for five years.

== Personal life ==
He has a daughter.
