= En decemberdröm =

- Genre: children
- Created by: Klas Östergren
- Written by: Klas Östergren
- Directed by: Tomas Alfredson
- Country of origin: Sweden
- Original language: Swedish
- No. of seasons: 1
- No. of episodes: 24

Original release
- Network: SVT1
- Release: 1 December – 24 December 2005

Related
- Allrams höjdarpaket (2004); LasseMajas detektivbyrå (2006)

En decemberdröm (A December Dream") is the Sveriges Television's Christmas calendar in 2005.

== Plot ==
The series is a fantasy tale where the main character, Bobo, meets tomtar and other folklore creatures.

== Selected cast ==
- John Jangard as Bobo Larsson, the 11 year old protagonist who suffers a head injury during a football match and falls into a coma, in which he dreams of the underworld.
- Frida Bergesén as Mary Marléne, Bobo's girlfriend who lives in the underworld.
- Christian Zetterberg as Gustav "Gurra", Bobo's best friend and classmate.
- Elisabet Carlsson as Lola Larsson, Bobo's mother and Benke's wife. She was a famous singer until she lost her singing voice when giving birth to Bobo.
- Robin Stegmar as Benke Larsson, Bobo's father and Lola's husband.
- Robert Gustafsson as Chefen, the lisping, molelike boss of the underworld.
- Henric Holmberg as Dorian, the father of Buick and Bentley. Lillefar's son and Daisy's husband.
- Siw Erixon as Daisy, the mother of Buick and Bentley and Dorian's wife.
- Niklas Hjulström as Buick, the son of Dorian and Daisy and Bentley's brother.
- Lisa Linnertorp as Bentley, the daughter of Dorian and Daisy and Buick's sister.
- Aksel Morisse as Ronson, the butler of the Rik och Dum family who reside in the castle.
- Iwar Wiklander as Tant Bölla, an old lady associated with the Rik och Dum family.
- Anette Nääs as Fröken, the teacher of Bobo's class.
- Alexander Karim as Vaktis, a Janitor at Bobo's school.
- Alicia Vikander as Tony, Mary's older sister and the leader of De Läskiga, a local gang who hangs out at the Alvéns shopping mall.
- Daniel Brandt as Zingo, a member of De Läskiga.
- Per-Owe Rehnberg as Pepsi, a member of De Läskiga.
- Jesper Tosavainen as Klubbmannen, a member of De Läskiga.

== Video ==
The series was released to DVD on 27 October 2006.
