= Dying of the Light (film) =

2014 film by Paul Schrader

- Theatrical release poster
- Directed by: Paul Schrader
- Written by: Paul Schrader
- Produced by: Scott Clayton; Gary A. Hirsch; Todd Williams
- Starring: Nicolas Cage; Anton Yelchin; Alexander Karim; Irène Jacob
- Cinematography: Gabriel Kosuth
- Edited by: Tim Silano
- Music by: Frederik Wiedmann
- Production companies: Red Granite Pictures; Grindstone Entertainment Group
- Distributed by: Lionsgate
- Release date: December 5, 2014
- Running time: 94 minutes
- Country: United States
- Languages: English; Romanian; Arabic
- Budget: $5 million

Dying of the Light is a 2014 American spy film, written and directed by Paul Schrader. It stars Nicolas Cage as an ex-CIA agent suffering from dementia who is on a personal mission to track down and kill a terrorist who had tortured him two decades earlier. Anton Yelchin and Irène Jacob also feature in the cast.

Dying of the Light was released theatrically and through VOD formats by Lionsgate on December 5, 2014, to extremely negative reviews from film critics for its plot, tone and Cage's performance. Schrader was denied final-cut privilege by the studio, who heavily reedited the footage without his consent. Schrader and his principal cast subsequently disowned the released version of the film and campaigned against it.

== Plot ==
Evan Lake is a highly decorated veteran CIA agent and Intelligence Star recipient reduced to a desk job at Langley with his protege and close friend Milton "Milt" Schultz. Twenty-two years ago during an op in Africa, Lake was captured by terrorist Muhammad Banir and tortured by having his head repeatedly bashed and having his ear mutilated. During the extraction and ensuing explosion, Banir went missing and was presumed dead, although Lake never believed it and has obsessively tried to find Banir ever since. As a result of the trauma he sustained under torture, Lake is now suffering from early stage frontotemporal dementia, and his boss considers him a liability to the agency.

In Bucharest, police tail a Kenyan national, Abdi, carrying a mysterious USB drive. A car chase ensues, and rather than giving himself up, the courier throws himself and the drive off a bridge. The Romanian Intelligence Service retrieve the drive and the body, but the data is corrupted, so it is subsequently sent to the CIA. Milt gets a hit on large quantities of an experimental drug treating thalassemia, information corroborated in the USB data. The drugs are for an anonymous Kenyan client, and are coming from a University of Bucharest clinic run by Professor Dr. Iulian Cornel. Since thalassemia is hereditary, Milt concludes that Banir is ordering shipments of the drug through a middleman, Dr. Wangari. He tells Lake, who asks his superiors to go after Banir. However, they still believe he's dead, and refuse. Later, Lake has a violent outburst during a search and resigns on the spot. During this time, in Kenya, Banir sends his man Aasim to Bucharest to find out why Abdi has not delivered the medicine.

Lake tells Milt about his mental deterioration, which becomes increasingly apparent as the film progresses. When Lake decides to go to Romania, Milt goes along. In Bucharest, the men meet Michelle Zubarain, a former journalist, possible agent, and Lake's one-time love, who has information about Cornel providing the drug Banir needs. The trio meet with the professor, compelling him to acknowledge his role and to admit that Banir is forcing him to travel to Kenya. As Lake, Milt, and Michelle leave the professor's office building, Aasim sees them. The next day, the three return to the professor's office in hopes of following whomever the professor meets. They watch until the professor comes outside to meet Aasim, but Aasim spots them and runs. While Lake takes the money, drugs, and passport from the professor in order to impersonate him in Kenya, Milt catches Aasim and slits his throat, effectively preventing him from contacting Banir.

Michelle finds a make-up specialist to help Lake transform into the professor, then Lake and Milt fly to Mombasa. The disguise works, and Lake is driven out of the city to Banir's hideout, and through a ruse and some small hand-to-hand combat, is finally alone with Banir. Lake reveals himself to the terrorist, but at that moment has an attack of dementia-fueled flashbacks, during which the disparity between the young terrorist who maimed Lake twenty-two years earlier and the now aging, fragile, and terminally-ill man is very clear. Without taking any further action, Lake abruptly leaves Banir. The next day, Lake and Milt are strolling around their Mombasan hotel's swimming pool and garden, which is full of people, when a shot rings out and a young Kenyan passing Lake suddenly drops. Lake sees that Milt has been hit, too (not fatally), and returns fire to the gunmen, ultimately killing both and being shot twice himself. Understanding that Banir has sent them, he takes their vehicle, driving into the night back to Banir's hideout, where he engages in a short (and prone) knife fight with Banir before killing him. But as he returns to Mombasa, he is still losing blood, and the flashbacks and voices return. Lake appears to drive head-on into a truck. The closing moments of the film move (with a voice-over by Lake) to Arlington National Cemetery, where a tombstone bearing Lake's name is shown; to Langley; to a voice-over of Lake giving a speech (from early in the film); and to Milt giving Michelle a memento of Lake's that is important to her.

== Cast ==
- Nicolas Cage as Evan Lake
- Anton Yelchin as Milton Schultz
- Irène Jacob as Michelle Zubarain
- Alexander Karim as Muhammad Banir
- Adetomiwa Edun as Mbui
- Geff Francis as Dr. Clayborne
- Silas Carson as Dr. Sanjar
- Claudius Peters as Ghedi
- Şerban Celea as Dr. Iulian Cornel
- Tim Silano as Mike Warner
- David Lipper as Bob Deacon
- George Remes as Jim
- Cosim Dominte as Policeman 1
- Ovidiu Niculescu as Policeman 2
- Arsha Aghdasi as Abdi Abikarim
- Seth Kozak as Therapist
- Ilinca Goia as CIA Secretary
- Alan O'Silva as Waiter
- Ethan Hawke as Narrator (Dark only)

== Production ==
In January 2010, Nicolas Winding Refn was attached to direct Paul Schrader's script, with Harrison Ford to star as lead. Channing Tatum was attached in a supporting role. Two weeks later, Refn left the film project to direct Drive. In June 2013, it was announced that Schrader would direct the film off his own script, with Refn joining on as an executive producer. A month later, Nicolas Cage was cast in the lead role, replacing Ford. In January 2014, Anton Yelchin joined the film (replacing Tatum), along with Irène Jacob and Alexander Karim. In March Red Granite International joined as producers. On August 19, it was announced that Lionsgate Home Entertainment had acquired the distribution rights to the film.

=== Filming ===
Filming was set to begin on January 27, 2014, to be shot in Romania, including in Castel Film Studios, Bucharest, and wrapped after five weeks followed by post-production to be done in the US. On March 5, 2014, Cage was spotted on the set of Dying of the Light in Queensland, Australia. The next day, it was announced that the shooting in Gold Coast, Queensland had wrapped and the rest of the film would be shot in Romania.

== Post-production and controversy ==
On October 16, 2014, Schrader posted on his Facebook page: "We lost the battle. 'Dying of the Light,' a film I wrote and directed, was taken away from me, reedited, scored and mixed without my input." This post was accompanied by photographs of himself, Cage, Yelchin, and Refn wearing a T-shirt carrying the "non-disparagement" clause of their contracts which prohibits them from criticizing the film in question prior to, during, and in a period immediately following a project's release. Schrader wrote:

Here we are, Nick Cage, Anton Yelchin, Nic Refn and myself, wearing our 'non-disparagement' T shirts. The non-disparagement clause in an artist's contract gives the owners of the film the right to sue the artist should the owner deem anything the artist has said about the film to be 'derogatory.' I have no comment on the film or others connected with the picture.

On December 8, 2014, the film's director of photography, Gabriel Kosuth, explained in a guest column on Variety.com that his color-significant cinematography had been digitally altered and that he "was denied the possibility to accomplish in post-production what is any cinematographer's duty: 'assuring that what audiences will see on cinema and television screens faithfully reflects the "look" intended by the director' (according to the American Cinematographer Manual)".

== Recreated original cut ==
In 2017 Schrader revisited his first cut and, working from DVD copies of the workprint, created a rough version of the film that approximates his initial vision under the new title Dark. Schrader's version of the film was not meant for official release or public exhibition, but can be seen by prior request at the UCLA Film and Television Archive, the Harry Ransom Center, and the Museum of Modern Art Department of Film. In 2018 he also made the film available via BitTorrent on The Pirate Bay. The controversy inspired Twitter users calling for the release of Schrader's cut.

== Reception ==
Dying of the Light currently holds a 13% rating, based on 38 reviews, on review aggregator website Rotten Tomatoes. On Metacritic, the film has a 31/100 rating based on 12 critics, indicating "generally unfavorable" reviews.
