= Walter Schmidinger =

Austrian actor

Walter Schmidinger (28 April 1933 – 28 September 2013) was an Austrian actor.

Schmidinger was born in Linz, and died, aged 80, in Berlin.

== Filmography ==
Year	Title	Role	Notes
1973	The Pedestrian	Policeman	
1975	Ice Age	Paul	
1976–1995	Derrick	Ludwig Dalinger / Fasold / Herr Steiner	3 episodes
1977	The Serpent's Egg	Solomon	
1979	Tales from the Vienna Woods	Conférencier	
1980	From the Life of the Marionettes		TV movie
1981	Der Bockerer	Schebesta	
1986	Boundaries of Time: Caspar David Friedrich	Basilius von Ramdohr	
1988	The Passenger – Welcome to Germany	2. Bewerber	
1988	Hanussen	Propaganda chief	
1989	Ein Sohn aus gutem Hause		
1994	Hölderlin-Comics	Friedrich Hölderlin – Elder	
2003	Scardanelli	Reading poems	Voice
2006	Requiem	Gerhard Landauer (Exorzist)	(final film role)
