= Meta Velander =

Swedish actress (1924–2025)

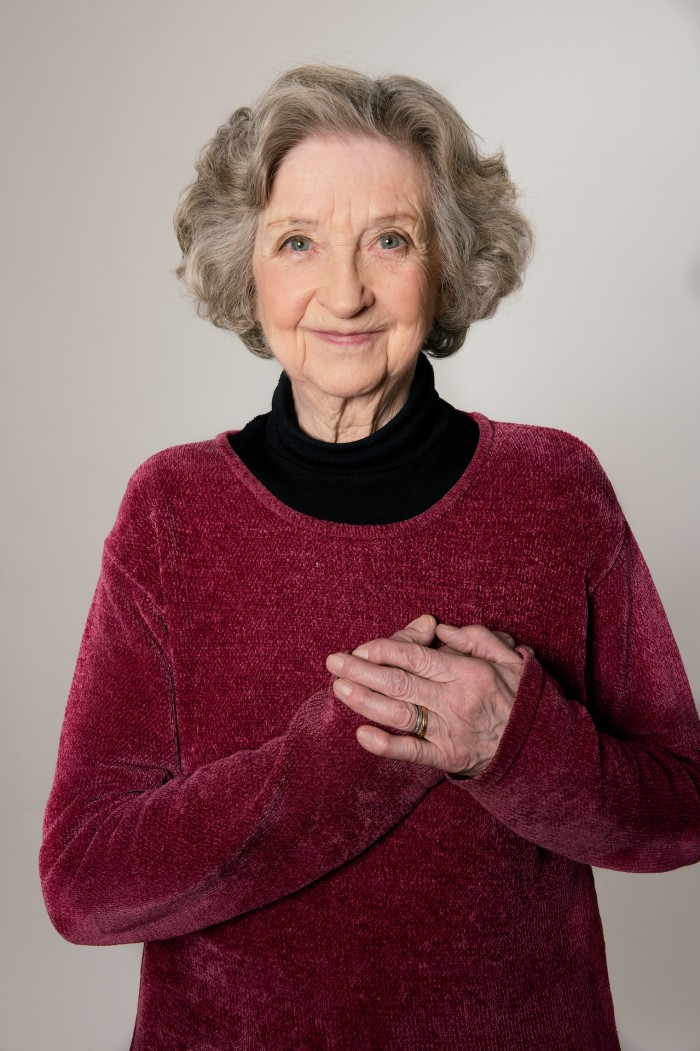
- Velander in 2014
- Born: Eva Margareta Velander; 13 August 1924; Danderyd, Sweden
- Died: 16 May 2025 (aged 100); Danderyd, Sweden
- Occupation: Actress
- Years active: 1945–2020
- Spouse: Ingvar Kjellson (m. 1949; died 2014)
- Children: 2

Eva Margareta "Meta" Velander (13 August 1924 – 16 May 2025) was a Swedish actress. During her career she had roles in both TV series such as Älska mig and films including Deadline and Dear Alice.

== Life and career ==
=== Early life ===
Eva Margareta Velander was born on 13 August 1924 in Danderyd and grew up in Kungsholmen in Stockholm, close to Rålambshovsparken, where she lived until she was twenty-one.

Meta Velander was the daughter of professor Edy Velander (1894–1961) and his wife Maj Halle (1893–1984).

== Career ==
Velander started acting in plays during her school years. After studying at the Royal Dramatic Training Academy between 1947 and 1950, she started working at Uppsala City Theatre, where she remained until 1957. She then worked at Stockholm City Theatre from 1960 onwards. She made her film debut in 1945 with a role in the film Kungliga patrasket. She presented episodes of Sommar i P1 at Sveriges Radio in 1982 and 2010.

In 1974, Meta Velander played the role of Hedvig in the TV series Huset Silfvercronas gåta, which was broadcast on SVT. In 1998, she played the role of Mrs Palm in the TV series Pip-Larssons, and in 2003 she had a leading role in the Carin Mannheimer TV series Solbacken Avd. E. both broadcast on SVT.

In 2001, she had a role in the thriller film Deadline opposite actress Helena Bergström. In 2010, she played Elsa in the film Dear Alice. In 2020, she had a role in the Viaplay TV series Älska mig.

== Personal life and death ==
Velander married actor Ingvar Kjellson on 22 June 1949 and remained married to him until his death in 2014. She lived in Djursholm, where she was born. She turned 100 on 13 August 2024.

Velander died on 16 May 2025, at the age of 100.

== Filmography ==
Year	Film	Role	Notes
1945	Kungliga patrasket	Autograph hunter	Uncredited
1950	While the City Sleeps	Café waitress	
1957	Summer Place Wanted	Radio drama actress	Voice
1958	The Phantom Carriage	Holms' neighbor	
1960	The Judge	Judge's secretary	
1964	Loving Couples	Lady	
1972	Andersson's Kalle	Camp instructor	
1972	The Man Who Quit Smoking	Press office clerk	
1972	Honeymoon	Mrs. Eriksson	
1980	Der Mann, der sich in Luft auflöste	Secretary	
1980	Marmalade Revolution	Court mistress	
1989	S/Y Joy	Aunt	
1990	Exit	Prompter at theatre	
1991	Agnes Cecilia – en sällsam historia	Vera Alm, Nora's grandmother	
2000	Pettson och Findus – Kattonauten	Elsa	Voice
2001	Deadline	Thomas' mother	
2010	Dear Alice	Elsa	

=== Dubbing roles ===
- The Aristocats (1970) – Amelia Gabble
- The Rescuers (1977) – Madame Medusa
- The Black Cauldron (1985) – Orddu
- The Great Mouse Detective (1986) – The Mouse Queen
- Beauty and the Beast (1991) – Mrs. Potts
- Beauty and the Beast: The Enchanted Christmas (1997) – Mrs. Potts
- Belle's Magical World (1998) – Mrs. Potts
- The Incredibles (2004) – Mrs. Hogenson
