= Running on Empty (2006 film) =

2006 film

- Directed by: Bülent Akinci
- Written by: Bülent Akinci
- Produced by: Gerhard Meixner; Roman Paul
- Starring: Jens Harzer
- Cinematography: Henner Besuch
- Edited by: Tina Baz; Inge Schneider
- Music by: Wim Mertens
- Release date: 14 February 2006
- Running time: 97 minutes
- Country: Germany
- Language: German

Running on Empty (German: Der Lebensversicherer) is a 2006 German drama film directed by Bülent Akinci. It was entered into the 28th Moscow International Film Festival where Jens Harzer won the award for Best Actor.

== Cast ==
- Jens Harzer as Burkhard Wagner
- Marina Galic as Carolin Wagner
- Anna Maria Mühe as Heike
- Christian Blümel as Charlie
- Mehdi Nebbou as Rachid
- Tom Jahn as Walter Rösler
