= Anders Andersson (actor) =

Swedish actor

Anders Christian Andersson (born 25 June 1952 in Malmö) is a Swedish actor.

== Filmography ==
- 1997 - King Lear
- 1997 - Ogifta par
- 2001 - Återkomsten
- 2003 - Järnvägshotellet (TV)
- 2006 - LasseMajas detektivbyrå (TV series)
