= Driving Lessons =

2006 British film by Jereny Brock

- Original poster
- Directed by: Jeremy Brock
- Written by: Jeremy Brock
- Produced by: Julia Chasman
- Starring: Julie Walters; Rupert Grint; Laura Linney
- Cinematography: David Katznelson
- Edited by: Trevor Waite
- Music by: Clive Carroll; John Renbourn
- Production companies: ContentFilm; Rubber Tree Plant; UK Film Council
- Distributed by: Palisades Tartan
- Release date: 8 September 2006
- Running time: 98 minutes
- Country: United Kingdom
- Language: English
- Box office: $1.3 million

Driving Lessons is a 2006 British comedy-drama film written and directed by Jeremy Brock. The plot focuses on the relationship between a shy teenaged boy and an ageing eccentric actress.

== Plot ==
Seventeen-year-old Ben Marshall is the sensitive son of complacent Robert, a vicar obsessed with ornithology, and domineering Laura, who performs numerous charitable acts while ignoring her family's emotional needs, such as forcing Ben to deliver meals on wheels despite his having no car. Despite her strong religious beliefs, she is having in an affair with Peter, a young curate portraying Jesus Christ in the church pageant she is directing.

Laura refuses to allow Ben to have a mobile phone or hang around people his own age, and uses his driving lessons to be ferried around for her affair with Peter. Miserable, Ben writes poems for Sarah, a girl he knows from church. He reads her his most recent "Sarah Poem", but she rejects him.

At his mother's urging, Ben seeks summer employment to pay for the upkeep of Mr. Fincham, a mental patient Laura has adopted. Ben responds to an ad placed by Dame Evie Walton, an alcoholic, classically trained actress; reduced to a role on a daytime soap opera when her career began to fade, she has not worked since. In search of a companion to assist her in the house and drive her to various appointments, Evie immediately takes to Ben and offers him the position.

When Laura refuses to allow Ben to take a camping trip with Evie, she suggests they take a drive in the country instead, then "swallows" the car key when they find an idyllic spot for a campsite. In the morning, she announces Ben must drive her to the Edinburgh International Book Festival, where she has been invited to read poetry. Their road trip provides an epiphany for Ben, who has his first sexual experience with Bryony, one of the young women organizing the event. He learns the importance of accepting responsibility and honouring commitments, and finds the inner strength to stand up for himself.

Returning home, Ben is interrogated by Laura, who believes Evie has "corrupted" him. Evie comes to visit, but is rebuffed by Laura. Ben discovers this, and in a fit of rebellion walks offstage during the pageant, riding his bike to Evie's house where the two friends reconcile.

Evie arrives at the Pageant and, "portraying" the part of God, whips the crowd into a religious frenzy, allowing Ben to join her in the car park. Laura chases the pair and tries to weaponise the Bible once more, but Ben finally tells her to go away. Laura is run over by Mr. Fincham, whose mental state has steadily declined. When Ben visits her at hospital, she tells him her near-death experience has made her a prophet, and that God says she must divorce Robert and run off with Peter, whom the Bishop has fired; Peter takes Laura to Cornwall to convalesce.

Ben storms off, and runs into Sarah, who prattles in a condescending tone that the affair was God's will. Finally speaking his mind, Ben tells Sarah to "fuck off". On Evie's advice, Ben buys a tent and moves into the backyard. Robert tries to speaks to him, but Ben shouts that Robert, not Laura, should have asked for divorce. His father reveals that he did, explaining that he loved his wife and had tried to be faithful even when she was not. Finally free from Laura's brand of Christian fanaticism, Ben and his father reconnect.

Ben visits Evie to tell her he is moving to Edinburgh to attend university and study English. Evie is pleased, though saddened Ben will no longer be working for her. He reads her a last poem expressing his gratitude for her friendship, for which Evie compliments him. Ben promises to visit her whenever he is home from college.

The film closes as Ben, finally free, walks through the park on his way home to start packing for Edinburgh.

== Cast ==
- Julie Walters as Evie Walton
- Rupert Grint as Ben Marshall
- Laura Linney as Laura Marshall
- Nicholas Farrell as Robert Marshall
- Michelle Duncan as Bryony
- Tamsin Egerton as Sarah
- Oliver Milburn as Peter
- Jim Norton as Mr. Fincham

This is the fourth time that Julie Walters and Rupert Grint have worked together on a film; the first three times were in the Harry Potter film franchise where Grint played Ron Weasley and Walters his mother Molly.

== Production ==
In Driving Lessons: Behind the Scenes, a bonus feature on the DVD release of the film, screenwriter/director Jeremy Brock reveals he was still making changes to his script during the rehearsal period, some five years after he completed his first draft. Although the film is not intended to be autobiographical, he was inspired to write it by his teen experience working one summer for Peggy Ashcroft.

It took six weeks to film the movie in the summer of 2005 and according to director Jeremy Brock the budget of the film was so small that it would not be enough for the catering in Harry Potter.

The film was shot on location in the Tottenham, Hampstead and Parliament Hill areas of London, at locations including the Parliament Hill Lido and the nearby Holly Lodge Estate. Other locations included Edinburgh and Burnham Beeches in Buckinghamshire.

The soundtrack includes songs performed by Salsa Celtica, Sufjan Stevens, Nick Drake, Richard Thompson, Ben Folds, and Ginny Clee.

The distributors were Tartan Films for the UK, Sony Pictures Classics for USA, Gateno Films in Peru, Cathay-Keris Films in Singapore, and Sunfilm Entertainment in Germany.

The film premiered at the Dublin Film Festival and was shown at the Tribeca Film Festival, the Cannes Film Market, the Moscow Film Festival, and the Edinburgh Film Festival before going into limited release in the UK on 6 September 2006.

The other film festivals that the film premiered in were Festival of Rio, Dinard Festival of British Cinema, Rome Film Fest, Austin Film Festival, Festival Internacional de Cinema de Brasília, Gijón International Film Festival, 18th International Film Festival Emden-Norderney, Jerusalem Film Festival, Galway Film Festival, Seaward 15th Chichester Film Festival, and Film by the Sea Film Festival.

The film debut on 8 September 2006 in the United States in cities Los Angeles and New York. It later moved on to other big cities in the United States throughout the rest of the year. The film also premiered in Italy and Thailand in December 2006. In 2007 the film was released in other countries such as Canada, Portugal, Brazil, Taiwan, New Zealand, Australia, and Singapore.

The film was released on 3 July 2007 on DVD in the United States.

== Reception ==
=== Box office ===
The film earned $239,962 in the US and $990,633 in other markets for a total worldwide box office of $1,230,595.

=== Critical response ===
On Rotten Tomatoes the film holds a 48% rating based on 75 reviews, with an average rating of 5.2. The critical consensus states that "Though it has charm, Driving Lessons is a middling offering in the genre where the youngster coming of age meets a quirky senior who teaches valuable lessons about life." On Metacritic, the film has a weighted average score of 56 out of a 100, based on reviews from 19 critics, indicating "mixed or average reviews".

Jason Clark of Slant Magazine gave the film a half star out of 4 while IGN gave it 4 out of 5 stars, suggesting an 8 out of 10 score.

Stephen Holden of The New York Times said the film "belongs to that hardy niche of British comedies designed as star vehicles for distinguished actresses (preferably Dames) of a certain age whose assignment is to win awards by devouring the scenery." He added, "The screwball ageing diva genre isn't the only formula guiding this stubbornly old-fashioned movie. Driving Lessons belongs to the silly feel-good mode of The Full Monty, Calendar Girls, Billy Elliot, Kinky Boots and dozens of other celebrations of Britons defying convention to become 'free,' whatever that means. Since any connections between Driving Lessons and the real world are tangential at best, it's a faux liberation: the easiest kind."

Ruthe Stein of the San Francisco Chronicle observed, "With the aid of a charmingly offbeat story and a jolly good dialect coach, the stars leave you thinking, well done. Their spirited performances help cover up glaring holes in the plot. Whenever Driving Lessons threatens to get off course, Walters . . . steers it in her direction. She doesn't so much steal the movie as borrow it for extended periods and return it with the motor purring."

Gene Seymour of Newsday said, "Everybody in Driving Lessons is working very hard to show how affecting and touching their movie can be. The collective effort invested in this ragged mongrel of a coming-of-age story may con even the most jaded moviegoer into thinking there's something profound being put forth. Forewarned, you may find it sweet enough to fill an empty afternoon . . . Driving Lessons follows the well-worn path laid down by other, better movies while making strained, ludicrous things happen toward the end."

Ronnie Scheib of Variety said, "The forceful [performances] of the two main divas manage to more or less blast away the moral bulwarks of this otherwise conventional coming-of-age story. The fanatic gleam in Linney's eyes as she oh-so-sweetly lays down the law is matched only by the spectacle of her shuddering attempts to control her fury when thwarted. Walters chews up scenery in grand manner, nicely teetering between drunken helplessness and zesty hedonism. Grint, maintaining puppy-dog altruism, holds his own in the matriarchal maelstrom, redheadedly adorable to the end."

Peter Bradshaw of The Guardian rated the film three out of five stars and commented, "The movie looks like a lot of other things: Driving Miss Daisy, Harold and Maude, Billy Elliot, Acorn Antiques. It doesn't quite develop its own identity. And it's somehow inevitable that Dame Evie's hilarious swearing and opinionating fade away as sentimentality takes over. But it's a great turn from Julie Walters, and a likable film."

== Accolades ==
At the 28th Moscow International Film Festival, Julie Walters won the Silver St. George for Best Actress and Jeremy Brock was awarded the Special Jury Prize. Walters was nominated for the Satellite Award for Best Actress – Motion Picture Musical or Comedy.
