= Matilda Grahn =

Swedish actress

Matilda Christina Marie Grahn (born 21 August 1995) is a Swedish child actress well known for her role as Maja in LasseMajas detektivbyrå.
