= Fjorton suger =

Fjorton suger ("Fourteen Sucks")
- Directed by: Emil Larsson; Henrik Norrthon; Martin Jern; Filippa Freijd
- Written by: Martin Jern
- Produced by: Ralf Ivarsson; Peter Possne; Filippa Freijd; Martin Jern; Emil Larsson; Henrik Norrthon
- Starring: Elin Ahlberg; Jesper Fridh; Andreas Karoliussen; Björn Månsson
- Music by: Filippa Freijd; Martin Jern; Emil Larsson; Henrik Norrthon
- Distributed by: Sonet Film
- Release date: 29 October 2004 (Sweden)
- Running time: 82 minutes
- Country: Sweden
- Language: Swedish

Fjorton suger (English: "Fourteen Sucks") is a Swedish film which was released to cinemas in Sweden on 29 October 2004, directed by Emil Larsson, Henrik Norrthon and others, about a teenage girl and her family.

== Plot ==
Emma is fourteen years old and lives with her parents and her older brother, Marcus, in a terrace house in Scania. She has many friends, but the contact between her and Marcus is not so good because he mostly thinks she is a tough and persistent little sister. The film is set during Emma's summer vacation. Emma and her friends are heading to a party at the home of one of Marcus' friends. Marcus is angry that Emma is at the party, and he thinks she does not belong there. He chooses not to go to the party because he does not want to party with his little sister. At the party, Emma becomes too drunk, falls asleep in a bed upstairs, and then one of Marcus' closest friends rapes her. Later, she falls in love with the skater Aron, but behaves strangely at times against him because of what happened at the party. After a period of several incidents, Marcus finally understands what his friend did to his little sister.

== Cast ==
- Elin Ahlberg as Emma
- Jesper Fridh as Markus
- Andreas Karoliussen as Aron
- Björn Månsson as Patrik
- Catherine Jeppsson as Emma's mom
- Jörgen Düberg as Emma's Dad
- Emily Nilsson as Lina
- Thea Klitte as Karin
- Thomas Hesslow as Per
- Simon Lindell as Andy
- David Sjöland as Daniel
- Sara Herrlander as Julia
- Otto Blücker as Kricka
- Jacob Walfridsson as Jacob
- Johan Billgren as Johan

== Production ==
The film was shot in Hittarp, Skåne County, Sweden, in July–August 2003.

== Reception ==
The Swedish newspaper Aftonbladet rated the film as 3/5.
