= Requiem (2006 film) =

2006 German drama film

- Theatrical release poster
- Directed by: Hans-Christian Schmid
- Written by: Bernd Lange
- Produced by: Hans-Christian Schmid
- Starring: Sandra Hüller; Burghart Klaußner; Imogen Kogge; Anna Blomeier; Nicholas Reinke; Jens Harzer; Walter Schmidinger
- Cinematography: Bogumil Godfrejów
- Edited by: Bernd Schlegel; Hansjörg Weißbrich
- Distributed by: X Verleih AG (through Warner Bros.)
- Release date: 2 March 2006
- Running time: 93 minutes
- Country: Germany
- Language: German

Requiem is a 2006 German drama film directed by Hans-Christian Schmid. It stars Sandra Hüller as Michaela Klingler, a woman with epilepsy, believed by members of her church to be possessed. The film avoids special effects or dramatic music and instead presents documentary-style film making, which focuses on Michaela's struggle to lead a normal life, trapped in a limbo which could either represent demonic possession or mental illness.

The film focuses on the medical condition of epilepsy as seen in the real-life events of Anneliese Michel, a German woman who was allegedly possessed by six or more demons and died in 1976. These events also served as the basis of Scott Derrickson's 2005 film The Exorcism of Emily Rose.

== Plot ==
Michaela Klinger, a 21-year-old woman from a fanatically religious Catholic family, is accepted into university. She has already lost a year of schooling due to a medical health issue. Her mother is wary but her father is supportive. She ends up attending.

On her first day, she is late to her first pedagogy class. Her professor stops her from taking a seat and asks what she believes in. She replies in God and the class laughs. She meets a former high school classmate, Hanna, who is cold towards her. She says pedagogy is an easy credit while Michaela replies that it's her major. While doing a test, Hanna seems stuck on something and Michaela helps her cheat and pass. This improves their relationship.

The women hang out together and go swimming in a lake. At the end of the week, Michaela is having dinner with her family and there is tension with her mother. She goes to a religious event with her family. One night she wakes up for water and has a strange experience when she is unable to touch her rosary when she drops it, and faints. Her father finds her and wakes her up.

She returns to school and goes to a party. She meets a guy and they kiss. Then she leaves to dance. Her friend Hanna finds her passed out the next morning. Michaela panics and Hanna finds out she has epilepsy. Michaela asks her to keep a secret, she doesn't want her parents to find out. Hanna agrees as long as she goes to the doctor. Michaela visits the Roman Catholic church and tells the priest about the strange events she's been experiencing, he doesn't believe her and says they're fantasies. He tells Michaela to visit a psychologist.

Michaela goes on a date on the lake with Stefan, the guy from the party. She goes to the doctor and has a test done in a machine, with an x-ray scheduled next week. She has a talk with a young pastor from the church and they pray together. Michaela has a drink with Hanna who has gotten an internship in another city. Michaela's father visits her who received her medical documents since she is still on their insurance. He is worried about her, but she reassures him by saying everything is in God's hands. She continues her schooling life and spends time with Hanna and Stefan.

Winter holidays begin and Michaela returns home. She spends Christmas with her family and gets into an argument with her mother because she threw out the new clothes Michaela bought. Michaela seems to have another epileptic attack and tries to pray during it. Her parents try to help her. She talks to a pastor and tells him praying doesn't work. On the way back with her dad driving, the car stalls for a moment.

Michaela returns to university and meets with Hanna, who is soon leaving for her internship. She tells Hanna that she's been hearing voices and asks her not to leave. They get into an argument about Michaela's drinking and her not seeing a psychiatrist. Michaela goes to see Stefan and they sleep together. She works on schoolwork and had a hard time doing an essay. She asks Stefan to help and typewrite while she dictates. They eat and Stefan types her essay when she falls asleep. They go out to party. Stefan is upset because he doesn't know how Michaela will handle four years of schooling if this is her reaction to her first semester. Stefan goes home.

Michaela's parents and pastors visit her together. Her mother and young pastor are shocked that she can't pray anymore. The older pastor warns everyone that an exorcism requires proof. Her father tells her to tell everyone that she's fine and has been studying and taking her pills. Michaela says she's okay. Hanna returns and talks to Stefan after meeting Michaela because she's worried about her. Stefan tells her they're practically over, but Hanna tells him about Michaela's epilepsy and that it's not about him. Michaela and Hanna fight about this. Stefan and Hanna try to help her.

Stefan takes Michaela to her parents'. Her father brings out medical documents and says she should've been in a clinic long ago. However, Michaela continues to believe she is possessed and a hospital can't help her. She locks herself in a room and breaks things. Her parents break in and her mother tells everyone to pray. Michaela covers her ears and screams. Her younger sister, who has been told to stay upstairs, is listening outside the room afraid. Her mother states she will stay at home, not a hospital because "the pills were useless".

The pastors arrive at their house. They all try to heal her through prayer and by expelling the demons in her. Stefan leaves the room. Throughout the film, Michaela has been obsessed with Saint Katharina, who was martyred at a young age, and aspires to be like her. Michaela mentions St. Katharine to the young pastor. Hanna arrives at the house and demands to see Michaela. Her parents explain she's possessed. Michaela and Hanna go out for a walk. Michaela says she'll stay there until her demons are driven out. Hanna tells her there's no "them", it's just her. Michaela continues to think it's God's plan and she's suffering for a reason like St. Katharina. It ends with Michaela in a car staring out of a window.

It is explained that Michaela died of exhaustion from exorcisms in her parents' home.

== Cast ==
- Sandra Hüller as Michaela Klingler
- Burghart Klaußner as Karl Klingler
- Imogen Kogge as Marianne Klingler
- Anna Blomeier as Hanna Imhof
- Nicholas Reinke as Stefan Weiser
- Jens Harzer as Martin Borchert
- Walter Schmidinger as Gerhard Landauer
- Friederike Adolph as Helga Klingler
- Irene Kugler as Heimleiterin Krämer
- Johann Adam Oest as Professor Schneider

== Release ==
=== Home media ===
In the US, Requiem was released as a region 1 DVD in 2007.

=== Critical reception ===
On review aggregator website Rotten Tomatoes, the film holds an approval rating of 86% based on 35 reviews, and an average rating of 7.4/10. The website's critical consensus reads, "This harrowing, naturalistic drama holds you in its grip through Huller's intense performance." On Metacritic, the film has a weighted average score of 82 out of 100, based on 13 critics, indicating "universal acclaim".
