= Jeremy Brock =

British film director and screenwriter

Jeremy Brock MBE
- Born: 14 July 1959 (age 67); Malvern, England
- Occupations: Film director, screenwriter, Playwright
- Years active: 1980s–present

Jeremy Brock MBE (born 14 July 1959) is a British writer and director whose works include the screenplays Mrs Brown, Driving Lessons, The Last King of Scotland, Charlotte Gray, and The Eagle. Brock has also written two plays for the Hampstead downstairs theatre, and co-wrote the lyrics for Tim Finn's second album Big Canoe.

== Early life ==
He was born in Malvern, Worcestershire. He had an older brother and sister.

He studied drama at the University of Bristol, where he met Paul Unwin in 1979.

== Career ==
His awards include the Evening Standard award for Mrs. Brown. Driving Lessons was entered into the 28th Moscow International Film Festival, where it won the Special Jury Prize. In 2007, he received the BAFTA award for best-adapted screenplay for The Last King of Scotland, co-written with Peter Morgan.

=== Casualty ===
He is the co-creator of Casualty with Paul Unwin. They created Casualty in reaction to what they saw as a "Thatcherite attack on our National Health Service", and that in 1985, "it felt like all that good work was about to be dismantled". Both Unwin and Brock had a shared love of M*A*S*H. The A&E department that they created was to be their "frontline in the battle for the soul of the NHS". They wanted to create something less cosy than the 1970s Angels. Much of their knowledge came from Peter Salt of Bristol Royal Infirmary. The first series owed much to the Welsh producer Geraint Morris.

== Filmography ==
- Mrs Brown (1997)
- Charlotte Gray (2001)
- Driving Lessons (2006)
- The Last King of Scotland (2006)
- Brideshead Revisited (2008)
- I Am Slave (2010)
- The Eagle (2011)
- How I Live Now (2013)
- A Little Chaos (2014)
- Dark Crimes (2016)
- Diana and I (2017)
- A Very Royal Scandal (2024)
