= Helena Willis =

Swedish illustrator and author (born 1964)

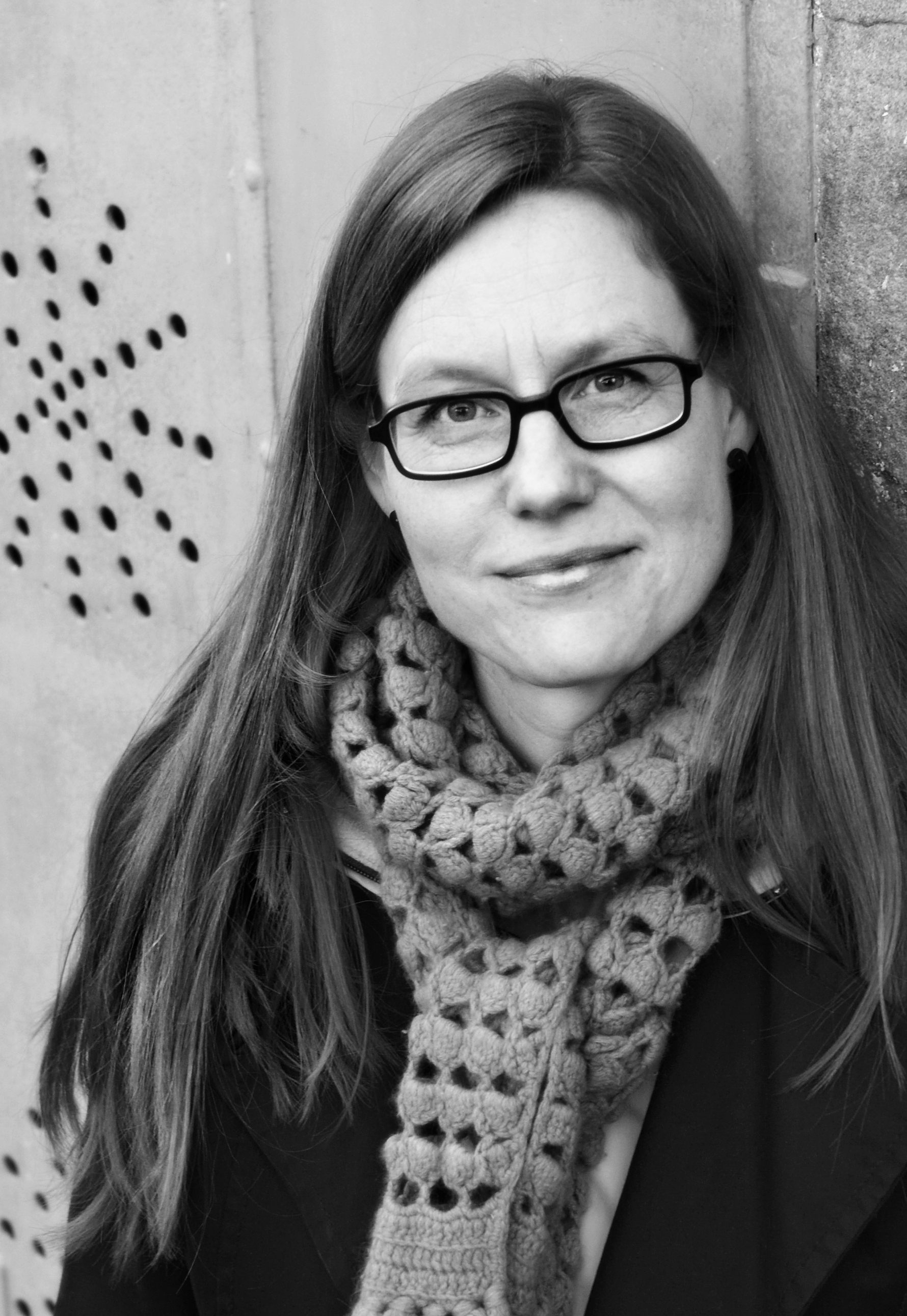

Helena Elsa Margareta Willis (born 16 April 1964, Stockholm) is a Swedish illustrator and author.

== Bibliography ==
- 2002–present – LasseMajas detektivbyrå (book series, written by Martin Widmark)
- 1994 – Sveriges miljöbästa butik (written by Hanne Simonsen)
- 1994 – EU, konsumenten och miljön (written by My Laurell)
- 1996 – Omtankar (written by Annika Forsberg)
- 1997 – Kaspar, Atom-Ragnar och gäddkungen (written by Mikael Engström)
- 1998 – Atom-Ragnar och snömannen (written by Mikael Engström)
- 1999 – Andra världskriget (written by Ulf Eskilsson)
- 1999 – Vilse i stenåldern (written by Bengt-Åke Cras)
- 1999 – Atom-Ragnar och mordbrännaren (written by Mikael Engström)
- 2001 – Kaspar och snömannen (written by Mikael Engström)
- 2001 – Hanna luras av Nalle Puh (written by Ulf Eskilsson)
- 2001 – Hanna och cykeln (written by Ulf Eskilsson)
- 2001 – Hanna och veckopengen (written by Ulf Eskilsson)
- 2001 – Hanna är hundvakt (written by Ulf Eskilsson)
- 2003 – Kaspar och båtsnurran (written by Mikael Engström)
- 2006 – Olga kastar lasso (also writer)
- 2007 – Olga och Stefan kräver guld (also writer)

== Awards ==
- 2010 – Bokjuryn (For the book Campingmysteriet in the series LasseMajas detektivbyrå, together with Martin Widmark)
- 2005 – Spårhunden & Bokjuryn (For the LasseMaja-book Tidningsmysteriet)
