= Einar Rosenqvist =

Norwegian naval officer and politician

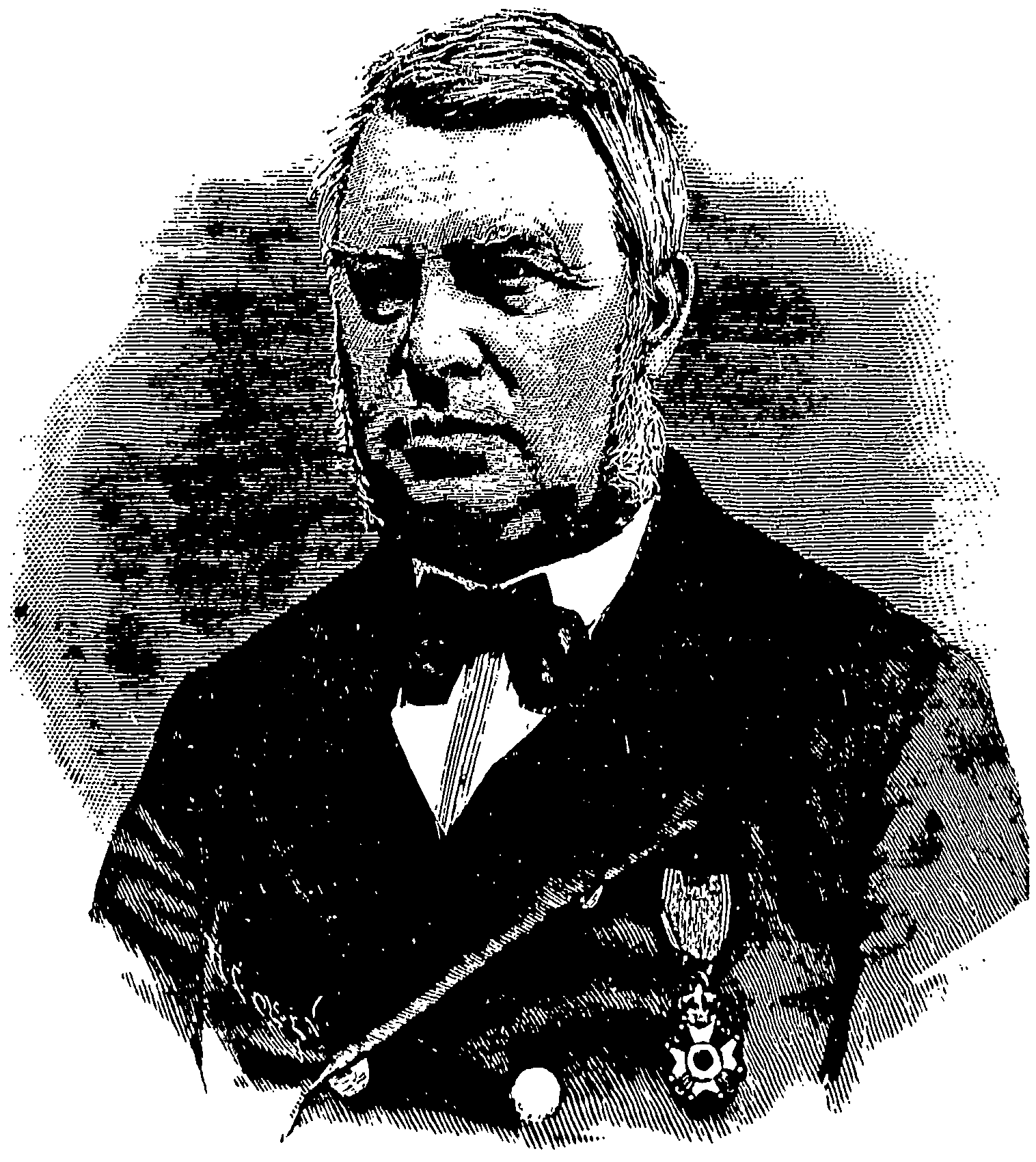
Picture, Verdens Gang 8 August 1885.

Einar Terkel Christian Tamberskjelver Rosenqvist (7 February 1817 – 17 April 1885) was a Norwegian naval officer and politician.

He was born in Christianssand. His father was a teacher, and was later transferred to Volden as a vicar, where he died in 1854. Einar Rosenqvist was a lieutenant in the Royal Norwegian Navy from 1836. He spent some years at sea, attended school and moved back to Christianssand in 1848. He became a member of the city council and served as mayor. He was elected to the Parliament of Norway in 1851, representing the urban constituency Christianssand. He also served as a deputy representative during the term 1871–1873. He had reached the rank of Commander in 1870. He was also mayor of Horten Municipality from 1874 to 1875, where he had been stationed as a naval officer, leading the Sjømilitære korps from 1871 to 1883. He died in Horten in April 1885.

He was decorated as a Knight of the Order of St. Olav. In their obituary in 1885, newspaper Verdens Gang claimed that Einar Rosenqvist was the only naval officer who was not leaning to the Conservative Party politically, rather the Liberal Party. The newspaper called him a "man of liberty and progress".
