= Mitsuo Kurotsuchi =

Japanese director and screenwriter (1947–2023)

- 黒土三男
- Kurotsuchi in 1999
- Born: 3 March 1947; Kumamoto, Japan
- Died: 25 March 2023 (aged 76)
- Occupations: Director; Screenwriter

Mitsuo Kurotsuchi (Japanese: 黒土三男, 3 March 1947 – 25 March 2023) was a Japanese director and screenwriter.

== Life and career ==
Born in Kumamoto, after graduating from the Faculty of Law at Rikkyo University, Kurotsuchi started his career as an assistant director at Kinoshita Keisuke Productions and later worked for two years as a freelance scriptwriter, making his debut as a TV scriptwriter in 1978 with Comet-san, broadcast on TBS Television. He made his film debut in 1989 with Music Box. For about a decade, he had a close professional association both as screenwriter and director with actor Tsuyoshi Nagabuchi, but their collaboration ended in 1999 over artistic disagreements on the set of the film Eiji. In 2005 he was awarded best director at the Japanese Movie Critics Awards for The Samurai I Loved. He died of multiple organ failure on 25 March 2023, at the age of 76.

== Filmography ==
- Music Box (1989)
- Traffic Jam (1991)
- Eiji (1999)
- The Samurai I Loved (2005)
- Hoshigure no machi (2018)
