= Emelie Rosenqvist =

Swedish actress

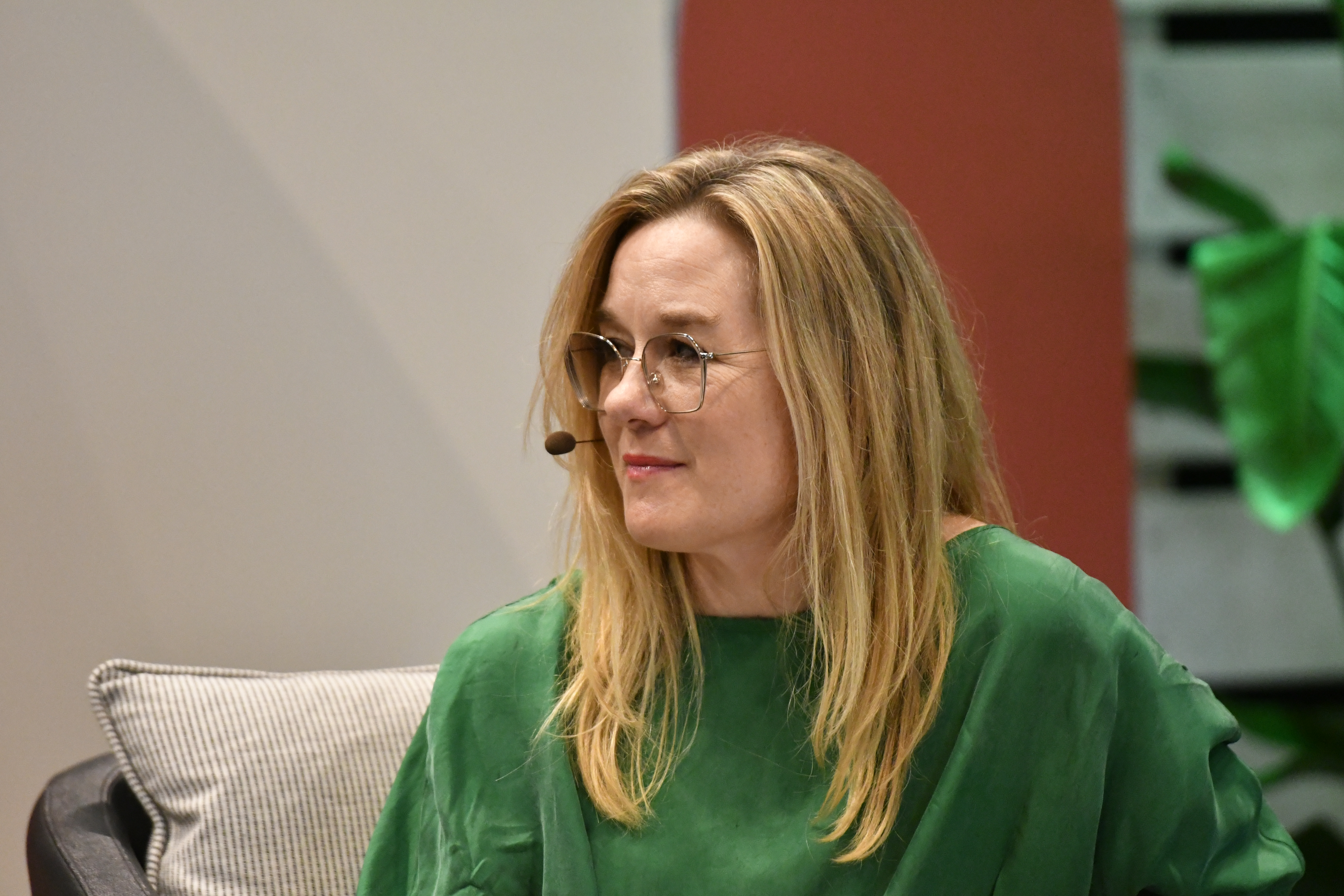
Emelie Rosenqvist at the Göteborg Book Fair in 2024.

Emelie Rosenqvist (born 27 November 1980) is a Swedish actress.

== Selected filmography ==
- 1993 - Allis med is (TV)
- 1996 - Skuggornas hus (TV)
- 1998 - Pip-Larssons (TV)
- 2005 - Lasermannen (TV series)
- 2005 - Kommissionen (TV)
- 2006 - LasseMajas detektivbyrå (TV series)
- 2006 - Min frus förste älskare
- 2007 - Upp till kamp (TV)
