= Bülent Akinci =

Turco-German director and script writer

- Born: 10 March 1967 (age 59); Ankara, Turkey
- Occupations: Film director, screenwriter
- Years active: 1998–present

Bülent Akıncı (born 10 March 1967) is a Turkish–German director and script writer. Since 1970 he lives in Berlin.

== Biography ==
In his youth he earned his money as musician, security guard and by selling insurances while he was finishing his graduation certificate from high-school. After high-school he registered to study philosophy, art history, theatre sciences at Free University of Berlin.

Then he was taken to study directing at Kaskeline Film School, which was founded 1926 in Berlin by German filmmaker Wolfgang Kaskeline. In 1996 Akıncı changed to DFFB Deutsche Film- und Fernsehakademie Berlin to finish his studies.

After shooting some short films, he finally won the F. W. Murnau prize in 2002 for his short film A short story (2001), starring actress Gudrun Landgrebe.

His first feature named Der Lebensversicherer was produced in 2006 and shown at the 56th Berlin International Film Festival. It later won a prize at the 28th Moscow International Film Festival.
