= Emil Larsson (filmmaker) =

Swedish film director and film producer (born 1979)

Emil Anders Larsson (born 11 March 1979) is a Swedish film director and film producer. He directed the Swedish movies Fjorton suger (with Martin Jern and other directors), Du & jag (with Martin Jern), and Odjuret (with Martin Jern).
