= Du & jag =

2006 film

- Directed by: Martin Jern; Emil Larsson
- Written by: Martin Jern; Emil Larsson
- Produced by: Martin Jern; Emil Larsson
- Starring: Noomi Rapace; Johan Hallström
- Cinematography: Linus Eklund
- Distributed by: Sonet Film
- Release date: 6 October 2006 (Sweden)
- Running time: 88 minutes
- Country: Sweden
- Language: Swedish

Du & jag is a 2006 Swedish film directed by Martin Jern and Emil Larsson.

== Cast ==
- Noomi Rapace as Maja
- Johan Hallström as Niklas
- Saga Gärde as Josefin
- Richard Ulfsäter as Erik
- Cecilia Häll as Anna
- Emil Stoltz as Martin
- Andreas Karoliussen as Niklas little brother
- Elin Ahlberg as Niklas' little brother's girlfriend
- Elinor Nilsson as Maja's little sister
- Hans-Christian Thulin as Palle
- Martin Wallström as Jens, a student
- Alexander Karim as Steve, Anna's boyfriend
- Tekla Granlund as Maja's mother
- Mats Malmstedt as Maja's dad
- Catherine Jeppsson as Niklas' mother
