= Henrik Norrthon =

Swedish Director (born 1979)

Henrik Norrthon (born 23 November 1979) is a Swedish Director. He also studied cinematography at the London Film School.

His film Fjorton suger (Fourteen Sucks) was released in Swedish cinemas in 2004 and was screened internationally at Film Festivals like Berlin Film Festival, Hollywood Film Festival, Seattle International Film Festival. It won the Main Golden Slipper for Best Feature on Zlin international film festival 2005. His film Utan titel (I love Johan) won the 1km Film Award at the Stockholm Film Festival. In 2008, he will be releasing his new film, British drama Taximan, starring Branko Tomovic, Christina Noland and Marija Karan.

== Filmography ==
- Taximan
- Fjorton suger
- Utan titel (I love Johan)
