= The Whodunit Detective Agency =

Children's book series by Martin Widmark

The Whodunit Detective Agency (also known as JerryMaya's Detective Agency, Swedish: LasseMajas detektivbyrå – "LasseMaja's Detective Agency") is a Swedish children's book series written by Martin Widmark and illustrated by Helena Willis. In the English translation, it is called "The JerryMaya detective agency".

Between 2014 and 2016 eight of the books were published in English by Grosset and Dunlap, an imprint of Penguin Random House.

Besides the books there are games, puzzles, etc.

A television series based on the books has been produced in Sweden.

== Series concept ==
This book series is about two children called Lasse (a common Swedish nickname for Lars) and Maja (in English, they are called Jerry and Maya) who live in the little city Valleby (in English, it is called Pleasant Valley). They like mysteries, so they have started a detective agency and help the police master of Valleby.

=== Books ===
A list of the books:

- 2002 - 1. Diamantmysteriet ("The Diamond Mystery", translated by Julie Martin)
- 2002 - 2. Hotellmysteriet ("The Hotel Mystery", translated by Julie Hazelryst, 2012)
- 2003 - 3. Cirkusmysteriet ("The Circus Mystery")
- 2003 - 4. Cafémysteriet ("The Cafe Mystery")
- 2004 - 5. Mumiemysteriet ("The Mummy Mystery")
- 2004 - 6. Biografmysteriet ("The Movie Theater Mystery")
- 2005 - 7. Tågmysteriet ("The Train Mystery")
- 2005 - 8. Tidningsmysteriet ("The Magazine Mystery")
- 2006 - 9. Skolmysteriet ("The School Mystery")
- 2006 - 10. Guldmysteriet ("The Gold Mystery")
- 2006 - 11. Saffransmysteriet ("The Saffron Mystery")
- 2007 - 12. Zoomysteriet ("The Zoo Mystery")
- 2007 - 13. Biblioteksmysteriet ("The Library Mystery")
- 2008 - 14. Fotbollsmysteriet ("The Football Mystery")
- 2008 - 15. Kyrkomysteriet ("The Church Mystery")
- 2009 - 16. Kärleksmysteriet ("The Love Mystery")
- 2009 - 17. Galoppmysteriet ("The Gallop Mystery")
- 2010 - 18. Campingsmysteriet ("The Camping Mystery")
- 2011 - 19. Sjukhusmysteriet ("The Hospital Mystery")
- 2011 - 20. Simborgarmysteriet ("The Swimming Pool Mystery")
- 2012 - 21. Födelsedagsmysteriet ("The Birthday Mystery")
- 2013 - 22. Cykelmysteriet ("The Bicycle Mystery")
- 2014 - 23. Brandkårsmysteriet ("The Fire Department Mystery")
- 2015 - 24. Fängelsemysteriet ("The Prison Mystery")
- 2016 - 25. Modemysteriet ("The Fashion Mystery")
- 2017 - 26. Slottsmysteriet ("The Castle Mystery")
- 2018 - 27. Silvermysteriet ("The Silver Mystery")

=== TV-series and films ===
In 2006, a TV-series based on the books was broadcast as julkalendern. In 2008, the film LasseMaja's Detective Agency – The Chameleon Strikes Back, which followed up the TV-series, was produced. Several films have been made since, including a TV-series from 2020.

- LasseMaja's Detective Agency – The Chameleon Strikes Back (2008)
- LasseMaja's Detective Agency – Shadows of Valleby (2014)
- LasseMaja's Detective Agency – Stella Nostra (2015)
- LasseMaja's Detective Agency – von Broms' Secret (2013)
- LasseMaja's Detective Agency – The First Mystery (2018)
- LasseMaja's Detective Agency – The Secret of the Train Robber (upcoming)
