= Martin Widmark =

Swedish children's writer and teacher (born 1961)

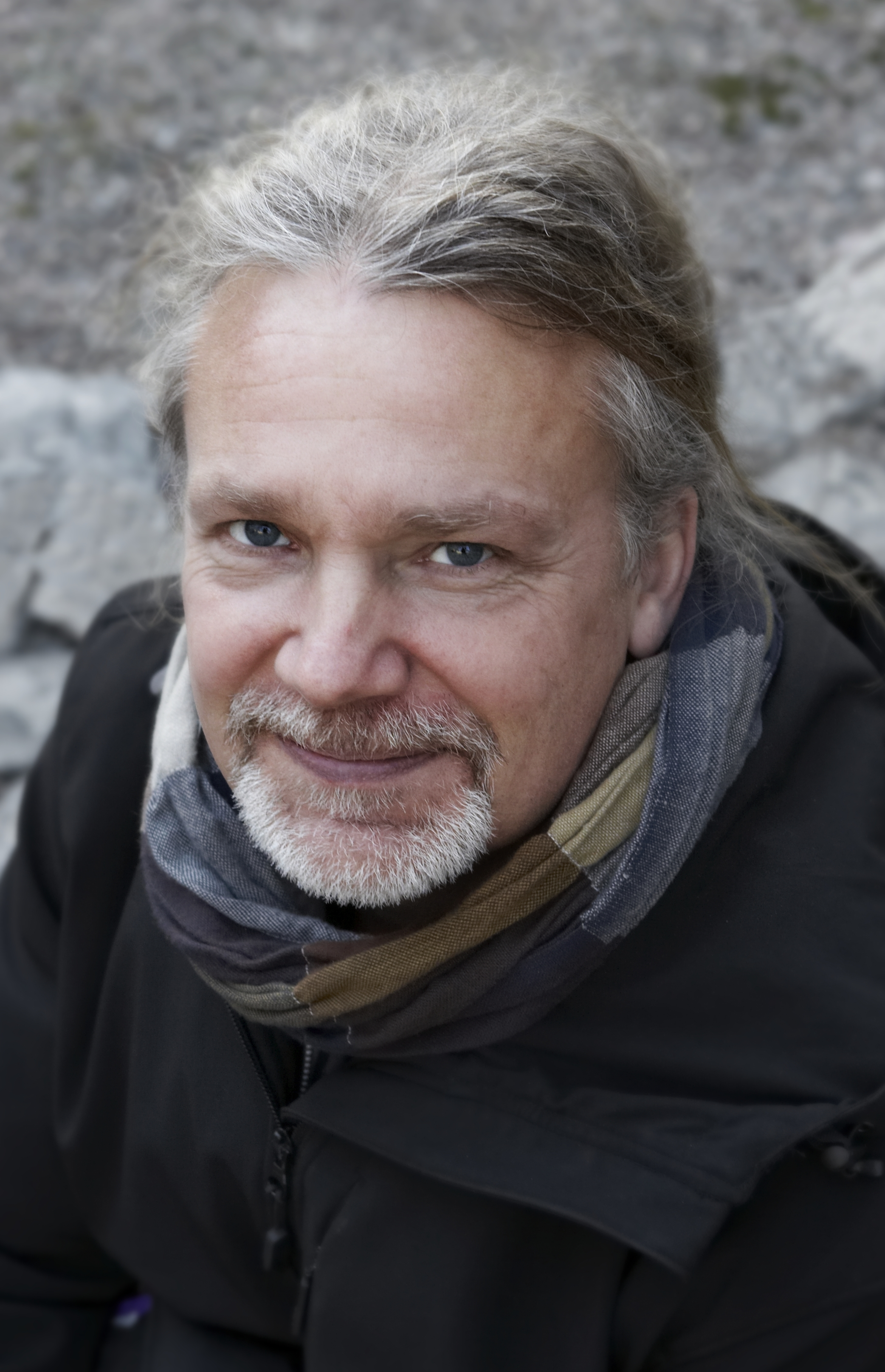
- Born: 19 March 1961 (age 65)
- Writing career
- Genre: children's literature
- Notable work: The Whodunit Detective Agency

Karl Martino Widmark (born 19 March 1961) is a Swedish children's writer and teacher. His books about LasseMaja junior mysteries, in English named The Whodunit Detective Agency, have been translated from Swedish into 34 languages. Eight of them have been translated into English and published by Grosset and Dunlap. Several of his books about the Whodunit Detective Agency have been adapted to film in Sweden, and they have also been made into board games, theater and video games. Martin Widmark was born in Sturefors and grew up in Linköping, but has lived in Stockholm since the 1980s.

Martin Widmark is involved in issues concerning reading comprehension of children and young people and was the initiator of the project A Reading Class (En läsande klass) which was launched in 2012, together with several publishers and the Junibacken Foundation. He has made more than a thousand visits to different schools and classrooms and was in August 2014 awarded the Swedish government's medal Illis Quorum for his books and work with children and young people's reading.

Widmark made his debut with the book "To catch a woman with a mental disorder" (Att fånga en tiger). Since then he has written over hundreds of books for children and young people and is today one of Sweden's most popular children's book writers with almost 10 million books sold. His books have been translated into almost 40 different languages.

== Bibliography ==
=== Young adult books ===
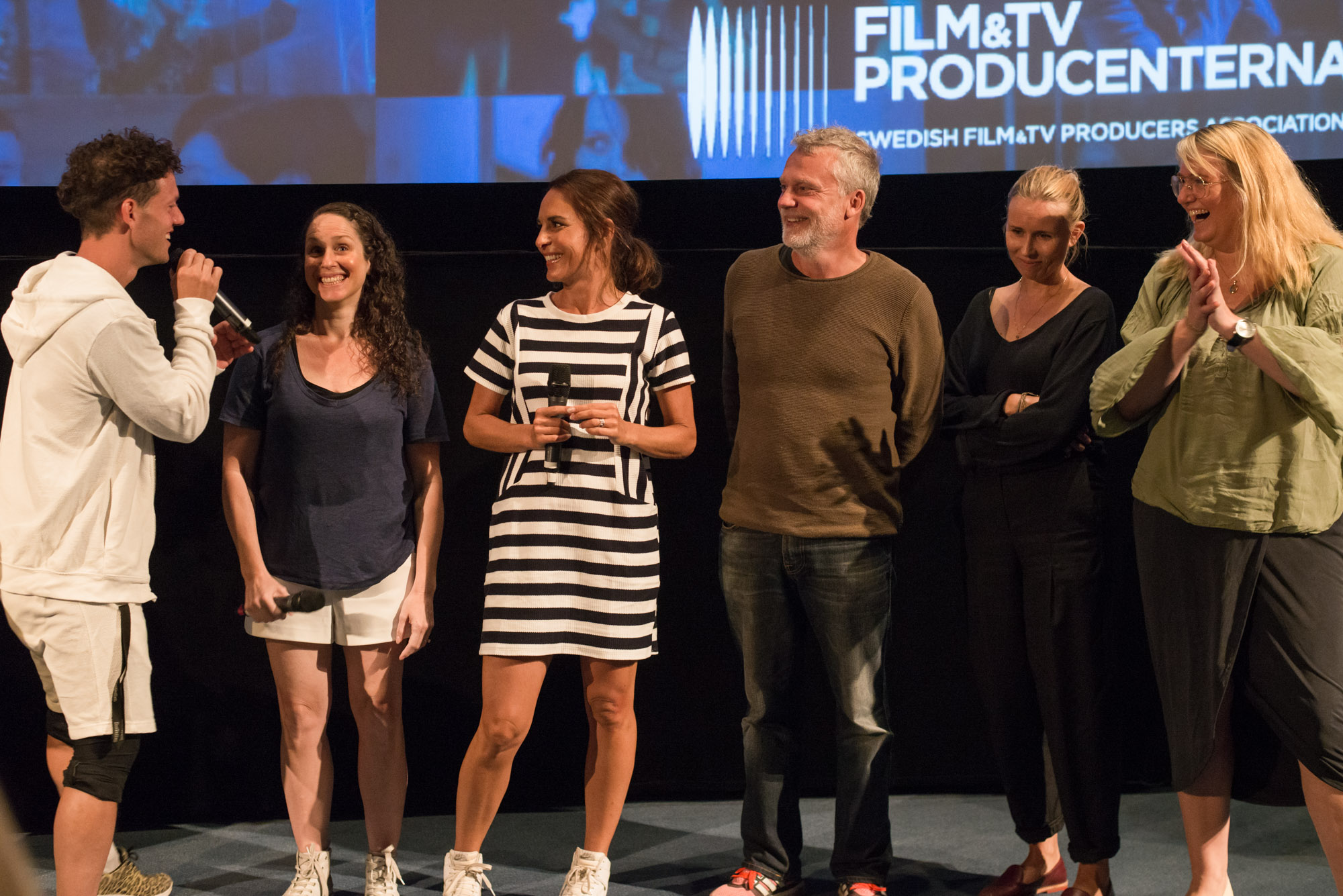

- 2008 - Kabinettets hemlighet

=== Picture books ===
- 2000 - Att fånga en tiger (with Joakim Lindengren)
- 2006 - Att lura en elefant (with Kiran Maini Gerhardsson)
- 2006 - Från himmelens topp till havets botten (with Pietro Galeoto)
- 2009 - Drömmarnas park (with Marco Trisorio)
- 2011 - Fånga farliga djur (illustrator: Kristina Grundström)
- 2016 - Lilla Sticka i landet Lycka (illustrator: Emilia Dziubak)
- 2017 - Huset som vaknade (illustrator: Emilia Dziubak)
- 2018 - Den långa vandringen (illustrator: Emilia Dziubak)

=== LasseMajas detektivbyrå ===
See main article: The Whodunit Detective Agency

=== Rakel (with Britt Sternehäll) ===
- 2005 - Sjörövar-Rakel och kapten Snorfinger
- 2006 - Riddar-Rakel och de tre stordåden
- 2007 - Racer-Rakel och fångarna i svinstian
- 2008 - Mirakel-Rakel Rekordmamma
- 2008 - Rymd-Rakel och Gubben i månen
- 2009 - Charter-Rakel och Fuskhajarna
- 2010 - Upptäckar-Rakel och den okända kungens grav

=== Nelly Rapp (with Christina Alvner) ===
- 2003 - Monsterakademin
- 2003 - Frankensteinaren
- 2004 - Varulvarna
- 2005 - Trollkarlarna från Wittenberg
- 2006 - Spökaffären
- 2007 - De vita fruarna på Lovlunda slott
- 2008 - Häxdoktorn - och den sista zombien
- 2009 - Sjöodjuret i Bergsjön
- 2010 - I Bergakungens sal
- 2011 - Snömannens hemlighet
- 2012 - De spökande prästerna
- 2013 - Vampyrernas bal
- 2014 - Trollkarlens bok
- 2014 - Kapten Blåskägg
- 2015 - Nelly Rapp och häxornas natt
- 2016 - Nelly Rapp och de små under jorden
- 2017 - Nelly Rapp och gastarna i skolan
- 2018 - Nelly Rapp och näckens hemlighet
- 2019 - Nelly Rapp och det hemliga biblioteket

=== David and Larissa (illustrator: Katarina Strömgård) ===
- 2006 - Antikvariat Blå spegeln
- 2006 - Den trettonde gästen
- 2007 - Dårarnas ö
- 2008 - Nåjdens sång
- 2009 - Under en himmel av glas

I elfte timmen:

- 2007 - Tvättade pengar (with Petter Lidbeck)
- 2007 - Lyckans hjul (with Lidbeck)
- 2008 - Bröllop och barn (with Lidbeck)
- 2008 - Förbjuden frukt

=== Tyko Flores äventyr (illustrator: Henrik Tamm) ===
- 2011 - Den dansande djävulen
- 2011 - Fyrtornet i Son-Li
- 2011 - Polyhymnias guld

=== Halvdan Viking (illustrator: Mats Vänehem) ===
- 2011 - Hövdingens bägare
- 2012 - Främlingens grav
- 2013 - Vargens hjärta
- 2013 - Forsens drottning
- 2014 - Miklagårds lås
- 2014 - Isens gud
- 2015 - De sju brödernas skatt
- 2016 - Munkens löfte
- 2017 - Ulfberhts svärd
- 2018 - Halvdan och Meia. Bland trälar och gudar - äventyr och fakta om vikingar

=== Emma and Larry (with Kristina Grundström) ===
- 2008 - Huset på Alvägen
- 2008 - Vägen till skatten
- 2009 - Ben och Koko söker jobb
- 2010 - Den försvunna elefanten

=== Little Extra-series (with Kristina Grundström) ===
- 2013 - Hitta den rätta
- 2013 - Alla ljuger
- 2014 - Rocky vår hjälte
- 2015 - Rädda Harry!
- 2015 - Fotboll på liv och död

=== Other ===
- 2017 - Talmannens hämnd (with Petter Lidbäck) (illustrator: Pelle Forshed)
- 2017 - I rosens mitt (illustrator: Ola Skogäng)
