= Amanda Jansson =

Swedish actress (born 1990)

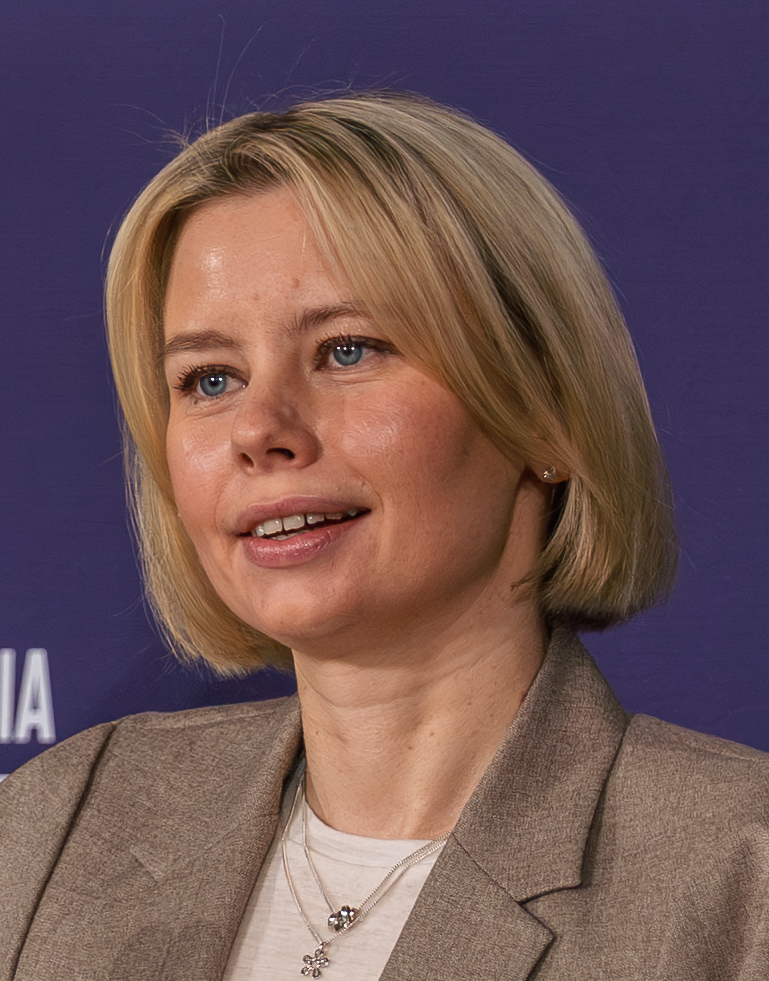
- Jansson in 2026
- Born: 26 April 1990 (age 36); Skärplinge, Uppsala County, Sweden
- Education: Luleå Theatre Academy
- Occupation: Actress
- Known for: Thin Blue Line; Stormskerry Maja; My Brother
- Awards: Jussi Award for Lead Actor

Amanda Jansson (born 26 April 1990) is a Swedish actress known for her work on stage and screen. She has received accolades including the Jussi Award for Lead Actor of the Year, Såstaholm Film and Performing Arts Award, and Best Actress at Series Mania.

Born in Skärplinge in Uppsala County, she attended secondary school in Gävle before graduating from the Luleå Theatre Academy in 2016. After minor roles in several television programmes, she was cast in the third season of Vår tid är nu (2019) before getting her breakthrough role as police officer Sara in Thin Blue Line (2021–present). She then appeared in Riding in Darkness (2022) before getting her first lead role in a feature film with Stormskerry Maja (2024). She played Jana Kippo in the television series My Brother (2025). In addition to her work in film and television, Jansson has appeared in a number of stage productions at theatres including Tribunalen, Playhouse, and Teater Västernorrland. She also made her debut as a musical artist in 2024 with the song "Ge mig ett svar", which was featured on the third season of Thin Blue Line.

== Early life and education ==
Amanda Jansson was born on 26 April 1990 in Skärplinge, a small town with a population of less than 1,000, in Tierp Municipality, Uppsala County, Sweden. Her parents were both employed at Forsmark Nuclear Power Plant. She has a younger brother. Jansson first became interested in acting after seeing a production of Mio, My Son at the Royal Dramatic Theatre on a school trip in first grade. Her parents separated when she was 12. For upper secondary school, she commuted by bus to study drama at Vasaskolan, a secondary school in Gävle over an hour away. While there, she appeared in their 2008 staging of Sara Kadefors's Hänga ut. Next, she was in their production of The Jungle Book. Kristian Ekenberg of Arbetarbladet praised Jansson's versatility across the three parts she played, writing that she "[changed] not only her clothes but also her face, body language and voice for each role". (Note: Swedish: som ändrar inte bara kläder utan även ansikte, kroppsspråk och röst för varje roll) The following year, she had her first paid acting job in a youth play about sexual assault which was performed at local schools culminating in a show at Kafé Spegeln in Gävle. After graduating from Vasaskolan, Jansson worked at the Forsmark Nuclear Power Plant. She then studied theatre at Fridhem Folk High School from 2011 to 2013. After being accepted to the Luleå Theatre Academy, she participated in Frankenstein at Norrbotten Theatre and Experimentet at Teater Tribunalen. Her maternal grandmother, with whom she had a close relationship, died of Alzheimer's disease in 2016. The same year, she graduated from the theatre academy.

== Career ==
=== Early stage and screen roles (2016–2020) ===
She had a minor part in the Swedish–French crime series Midnattssol (2016). Then she appeared in Rebecka Martinsson, a TV4 adaptation of Åsa Larsson's detective novels that premiered on International Women's Day in 2017. In September, she played The Baroness in Uppdrag Nelly Rapp, a children's theatre production of Martin Widmark's Trollkarlens bok in Örebro. She was then cast in the third season of the historical drama Vår tid är nu (2019), where she played a left-wing radical named Gunilla. Later that year, Jansson was in a production of David Byrne's play Secret Life of Humans, performed in Swedish with the title of Människans hemlighet at Playhouse Teater in Stockholm. She starred in the play alongside Charlie Gustafsson, a fellow alum of Vår tid är nu. Back at Playhouse, she was a member of the ensemble in an October 2020 production of Noah Haidle's Birthday Candles, staged in Swedish as Tårtljus. In a review of the production for Dagens Nyheter, Niklas Wahllöf cited Jansson's comic acting as a highlight. She next had a supporting role in Beck – Utom rimligt tvivel, which premiered on C More in December.

=== Breakthrough and continued projects (2021–present) ===
Her first lead role on screen was in Thin Blue Line as Sara, a naïve Christian woman who moves from Umeå to work as a police officer in Malmö. She was cast in part due to her experience with Norrland dialects, but she also completed further training to capture her character's specific Umemål dialect. The first season premiered in January 2021 to strong viewership, with over a million people tuning in to view the programme. Overall, it received positive reception from critics, with an average rating of 3.9/5 on the Swedish review aggregator website Kritiker. It won Best TV Drama and Best Programme at Kristallen 2021. Nina Hampusson of Damernas Värld, Joakim Lowing of Allas, and Mikael Forssell of Svenska Dagbladet all characterised Sara as her breakthrough role. She reprised the role in the next two seasons. The third was originally planned to be the last, but in September 2025 it was announced that she would be playing Sara again in a Christmas special, consisting of four episodes to be released in December 2026.

She appeared in Riding in Darkness, a 2022 limited series based on the real case of a riding instructor who was convicted of sexually abusing teenage girls at his horse farm. Jansson played Frida, a victim in denial who continues to support the riding instructor despite his abuse. Her performance and Saga Samuelsson's as Molly, the victim who dares to report him, were cited as standouts by Wanda Bendjelloul in Dagens Nyheter; she wrote that they represented "two sides of the same trauma". (Note: Swedish: två olika sidor av ett och samma trauma) In November 2023, Jansson was awarded the Culture Prize from Gefle Dagblad, in recognition of a "strong breakthrough in Swedish acting". (Note: Swedish: ett starkt genombrott inom svenskt skådespeleri)

In Stormskerry Maja (2024), a Finnish historical drama film adapted from Anni Blomqvist's book series, Jansson played the titular lead. It was her first main role in a feature film. To prepare, she learned to speak in an Åland dialect, milk cows, clean fish, and spin yarn. The film was a box office success in Finland; as of April 2024 it was the country's most-watched domestic film of the decade. It also was nominated for nine Jussi Awards and won six, including Jansson's Jussi Award for Lead Actor of the Year. Because of her work in Stormskerry Maja, she was nominated for Finland-Swede of the Year; the other two finalists were President Alexander Stubb and runner Nathalie Blomqvist. The film received a more mixed response in Sweden, although Jansson's performance was well-received, particularly by Jan-Olov Andersson of Aftonbladet. Praising her emotional range, he felt her performance carried the film. That year, she made her debut as a musical artist (under the name of Ada) with "Ge mig ett svar". The song, which was produced in conjunction with Irya Gmeyner and Martin Hederos, was featured on the third season of Thin Blue Line. She also received the Såstaholm Film and Performing Arts Award, with the jury commending her work across stage and screen.

She starred in a stage adaptation of Karin Smirnoff's novel Jag for ner till bror at Teater Västernorrland in Sundsvall. The 2024 production, adapted by Ivar Waldemarson and directed by Julia Marko-Nord, received positive reviews from critics. Praise was given to Jansson's performance, with Anna Hedelius of SVT Nyheter writing: "Most of all, Amanda Jansson shines, portraying Jana Kippo as strong, vulnerable, and broken, yet also whole". (Note: Swedish: Mest av alla glänser förstås Amanda Jansson som gör Jana Kippo precis så stark, sårbar och förstörd men ändå hel) It was announced later that year that she would be reprising the role in a television adaptation of Jag for ner till bror. Released with an English title of My Brother, the series premiered on 26 December 2025. Jansson characterised Jana as her most difficult role to date. In a review for Dagens Nyheter, Fredrik Sahlin praised her performance and highlighted the dynamic between Jansson's character and her twin Bror, played by Rasmus Johansson. She won Best Actress at Series Mania for My Brother and was nominated for a Kristallen for Best Actress.

Jansson hosted an episode of Sommar on 11 July 2026, where she reflected on her upbringing in the countryside and discussed experiencing performance anxiety as an actress. She was cast in a lead role for the short film A Land, as a seasonal worker who finds love in Åland.

== Personal life ==
Jansson lives in Gävle as of 2025; she moved there from Stockholm in 2018 to spend more time with her family.

== Acting credits ==
Key
†	Denotes work that has not yet been released

=== Film ===
Year	Title	Role	Notes	Ref.
2024	Stormskerry Maja	Maja		
TBA	A Land †	Anna	Short film	

=== Television ===
Year	Title	Role	Notes	Ref.
2016	Midnattssol			
2017	Rebecka Martinsson			
2019	Vår tid är nu	Gunilla	Season 3	
2020	Beck – Utom rimligt tvivel		Television film	
2021–present	Thin Blue Line	Sara		
2022	Riding in Darkness	Frida	Miniseries	
2025	My Brother	Jana Kippo		

=== Theatre ===
Year	Title	Role	Venue	Notes	Ref.
2014	Frankenstein		Norrbotten Theatre		
2015	Experimentet		Teater Tribunalen		
2016	Mästaren och Margarita	Michail Aleksandrovitj Berlioz	Luleå Theatre Academy		
2017	Uppdrag Nelly Rapp	The Baroness	Teater Martin Mutter		
2019	Människans hemlighet	Ava	Playhouse Teater		
2020	Tårtljus	Multiple	Playhouse Teater		
2024	Jag for ner till bror	Jana Kippo	Teater Västernorrland		

== Awards and nominations ==
Year	Award	Category	Nominated work	Result	Ref.
2023	Gefle Dagblad Culture Prize		—N/a	Won	
2024	Såstaholm Film and Performing Arts Award		—N/a	Won	
2024	Finland-Swede of the Year		—N/a	Nominated	
2025	Jussi Awards	Lead Actor of the Year	Stormskerry Maja	Won	
2025	Septimius Awards	Best Actress	Stormskerry Maja	Nominated	
2026	Series Mania	Best Actress	My Brother	Won	
2026	Kristallen	Best Actress	My Brother	Nominated	
