= My Brother =

My Brother may refer to:

- My Brother (book), a 1987 book, biography of Muhammad Ali Jinnah, the founder of Pakistan
- My Brother, a 2007 book by Anthony Browne (third in the My Family Member series)
- My Brother (2004 film), a Korean film starring Won Bin
- My Brother (2006 film), a film starring Vanessa L. Williams and Tatum O'Neal
- My Brother (TV series), a 2025 Swedish television adaptation of Karin Smirnoff's novel

== See also ==
- My Brother's Keeper (disambiguation)
