= Hedda Stiernstedt =

Swedish actress

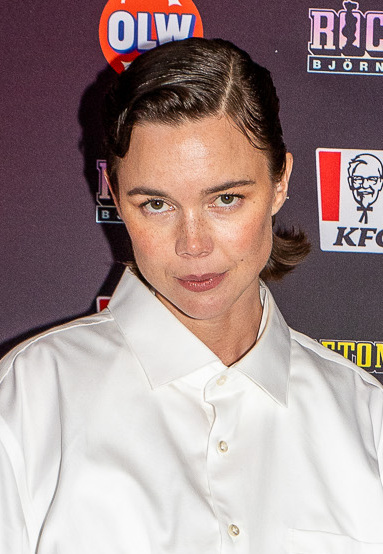
- Stiernstedt in 2024
- Born: Hedda Matilda Stiernstedt; 3 December 1987 (age 38); Stockholm, Sweden
- Education: Östra Real
- Occupation: Actress
- Years active: 2011–present
- Spouse: Alexis Almström (m. 2021)
- Children: 1
- Parents: Jöran Modéer; Metta Stiernstedt
- Family: Stiernstedt
- Awards: Kristallen 2018 Best Actress

Hedda Matilda Stiernstedt (born 3 December 1987) is a Swedish actress. Her breakthrough roles were as Nina Löwander in Vår tid är nu (2017–2021) and as Alice in Unga Sophie Bell (2015).

== Life and career ==
=== Early life and career beginnings ===
Stiernstedt was born 3 December 1987, in St. Göran's parish, Sweden. Her father, Jöran Modéer, is a painter. Her mother, Baroness Metta Stiernstedt, of the Stiernstedt family, is a teacher. A maternal ancestor, Erik Gustaf Geijer was a renowned Swedish writer, historian, poet, philosopher and composer.

Stiernstedt attended Östra Real.

In 2015, she played the leading role in the film Unga Sophie Bell. She also appeared in the music video for the song "Addicted to You" by Avicii.

=== 2017–2021: Vår tid är nu ===
Since 2017, she has been cast in the role of Nina Löwander in the drama series Vår tid är nu (English title: The Restaurant), broadcast on SVT. In 2018, she won a Kristallen award in the category "Best actress in a TV drama", for her role as Nina.

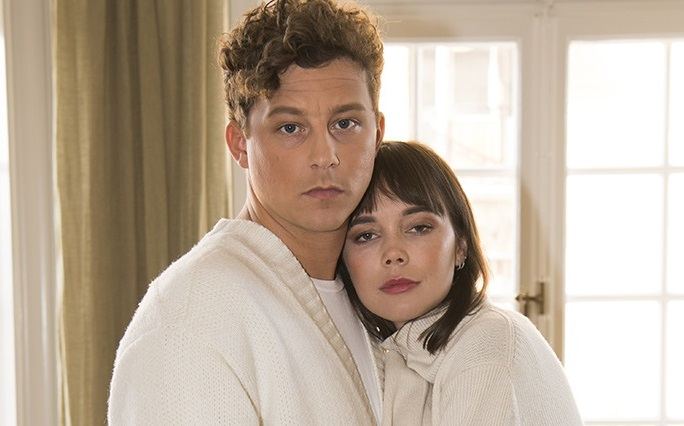
The characters Calle & Nina of the Swedish TV series "The Restaurant" ("Vår tid är nu").

== Media image ==
In 2020, Stiernstedt was awarded the honorary prize for being the best dressed woman in Sweden at Swedish Elle Magazine's Fashion Gala. She was also ranked in a survey conducted by Storytel as having the fourth hottest voice in Sweden.

== Personal life ==
Stiernstedt revealed that she had planned to marry in the summer of 2020, but due to the COVID-19 pandemic, the wedding was postponed. The couple then married in secret during 2021. She gave birth to her first child in October 2025.

== Filmography ==
- 2011 – Supernova (TV-series)
- 2012 – Portkod 1321 (TV-series)
- 2013 – Hot Chicks (shortfilm)
- 2013 – Studentfesten (film)
- 2013 – Wallander – Sveket (film)
- 2013 – Monica Z (film)
- 2013 – Den fördömde (TV-series)
- 2014 – Kommissarien och havet (TV-series)
- 2015 – Young Sophie Bell (film)
- 2015 – Norskov (TV-series)
- 2015 – 100 Code (TV-series)
- 2015 – Eternal Summer (film)
- 2016 – Pink Cloud syndrome (film)
- 2017 – Vår tid är nu (TV-series)
- 2018 – Black Lake – Svartsjön (TV series)
- 2018 – Vår tid är nu season 2 (TV-series)
- 2019 – Vår tid är nu season 3 (TV-series)
- 2020 – Fjols til fjells (film)
- 2020 – Min pappa Marianne (film)
- 2020 – Se upp för Jönssonligan (film)
- 2020 – Vår tid är nu season 4 (TV-series)
- 2021 – Beforeigners season 2 (TV-series)
- 2023 – One More Time (film)
- 2023 – Fallen (TV-series)
- 2023 – Börje Salming (TV-series)
- 2024 – Boundless (film)
