= Thin Blue Line (Swedish TV series) =

Swedish television series (2021)

- Genre: Police procedural
- Starring: Amanda Jansson; Oscar Töringe; Gizem Erdogan; Per Lasson; Sandra Stojiljkovic; Anna Sise
- Country of origin: Sweden
- Original language: Swedish
- No. of seasons: 3
- No. of episodes: 24

Production
- Production company: Anagram Sweden

Original release
- Network: SVT
- Release: January 17, 2021 – present

Thin Blue Line (Swedish: Tunna blå linjen) is a Swedish police procedural drama television series created by Anagram Sweden. It premiered on Sveriges Television (SVT) in Sweden on 17 January 2021. A second season was aired in 2022, with a third and final season broadcast on SVT in September 2024. Four new episodes are scheduled to air in December 2026 as part of a Christmas special.

== Synopsis ==
The first season of the series consists of 10 episodes and follows the private and professional struggles of six police officers working in the multicultural southern Swedish city of Malmö, with more emphasis on their personal drama than crime-driven plot.

In the words of the writer, the series asks the questions "How do you remain a whole human being seeing so much hardship, so many horrid things?... How can I be a hopeful person in this world we live in, with the problems we have?", and shows how the four main characters cope in different ways.

== Cast and characters ==
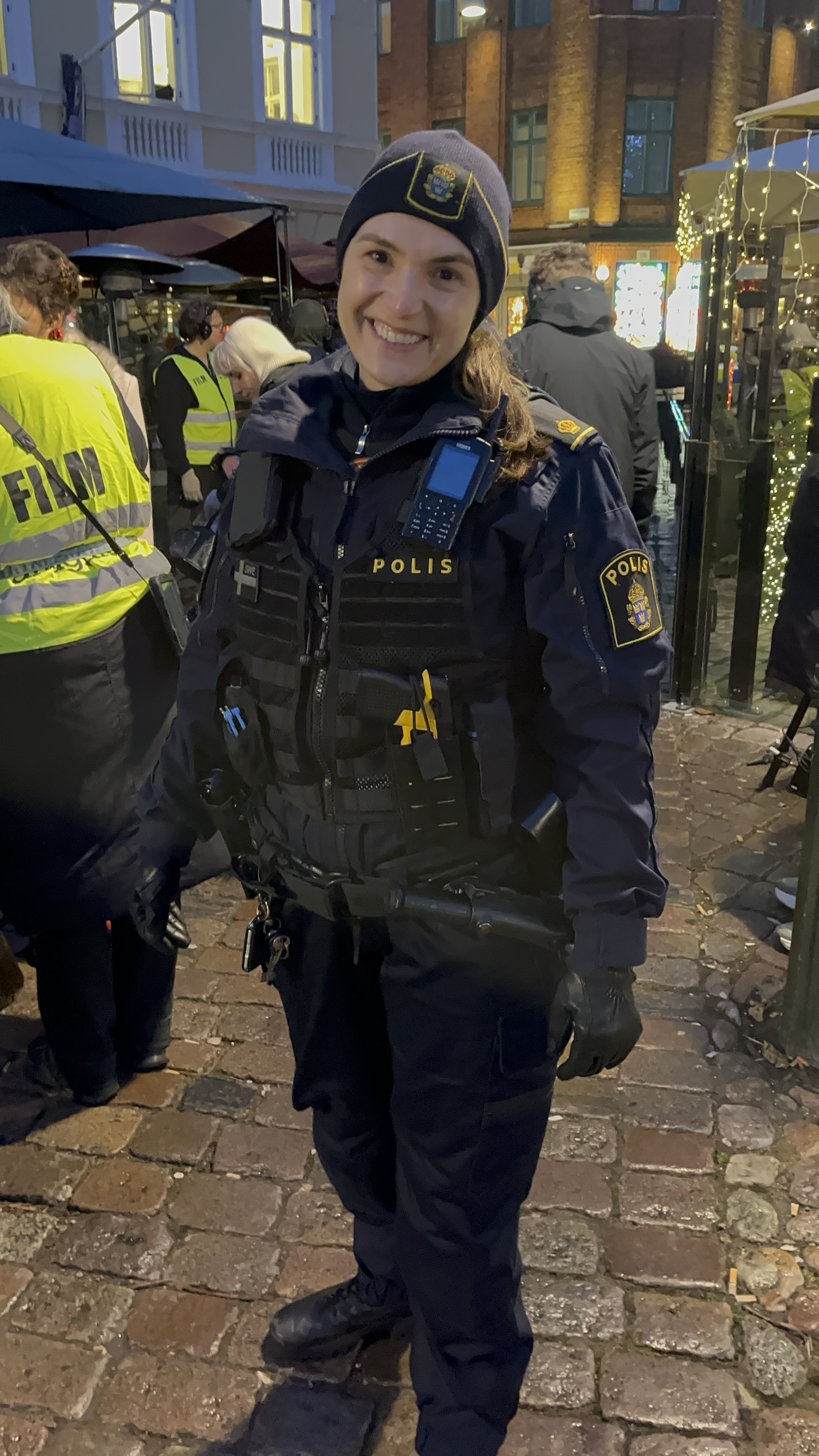
Sandra Stojiljkovic on set as her character Danijela

The main characters are:

- Sara – Amanda Jansson
- Magnus – Oscar Töringe
- Leah – Gizem Erdogan
- Jesse – Per Lasson
- Danijela – Sandra Stojiljkovic
- Faye – Anna Sise

=== Season 3 ===
- Khalid – Mustafa Al-Mashhadani
- Fanny – Malou Marnfeldt

== Production ==
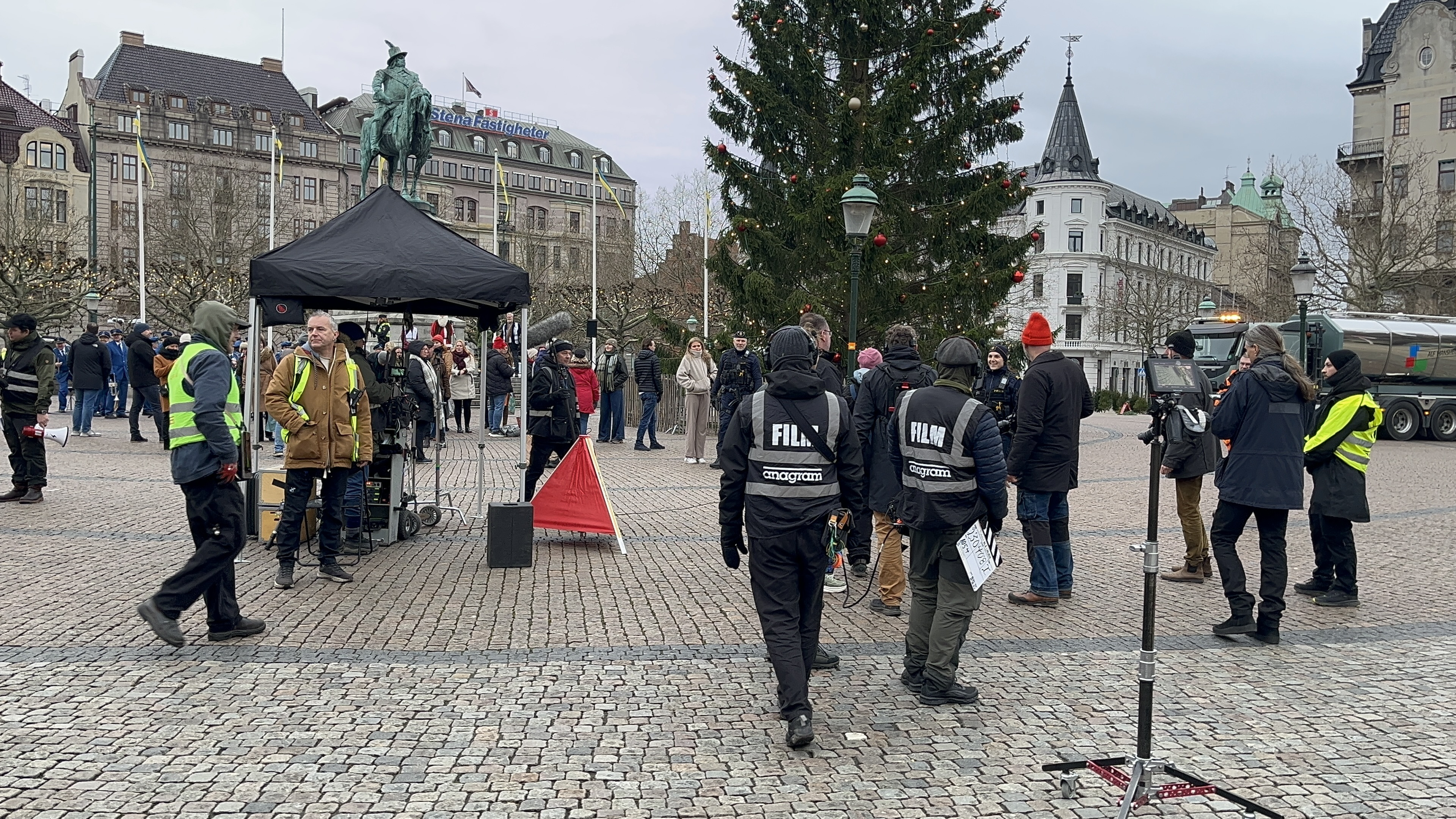
Principal photography at Stortorget in Malmö

Mikael Hansson and Anders Hazelius directed six episodes each, across two seasons. Four episodes were directed by Sanna Lenken (who directed My Skinny Sister). Cilla Jackert, lead writer on the series, started writing it in 2014. The series was made by Anagram Sweden, with Polish company Fixafilm providing digital imaging technician services. The filming of season 1 took place between June 2019 and January 2020.

Season 3 was also written by Cilla Jackert and produced by Anagram Sverige. It was co-produced with SVT, Film i Skåne, and Helsinki Filmi, in cooperation with other national broadcasters: NRK, DR, RÚV, and Yle.

== Release ==
The first season of the series premiered in Sweden's SVT on 17 January 2021, followed by the other Nordic state broadcasters: Finland's YLE and Norway's NRK later in the month; Iceland's RUV in February; and Denmark's public broadcaster DR in March.

Thin Blue Line is distributed internationally by ITV Studios. It was released on SBS on Demand in Australia on 1 October 2021, and premiered on SBS Television on 5 April 2022. In Germany it is broadcast by ZDF in July 2022.

A second season aired in 2022.

A third season was announced in April 2023. Season 3, the final season, premiered on SVT in September 2024. It is being distributed internationally by ITV.

Four new episodes are scheduled to air in December 2026 as part of a Christmas special.

== Awards ==
The series was entered for the Nordisk Film & TV Fond Prize at the Göteborg Film Festival in 2021.

The series won "Best TV Drama and Best Programme of the year" at the annual Swedish television awards, the Kristallen TV Awards, on 27 August 2021.
