= 30 Degrees in February =

Swedish drama series

- Swedish: 30 grader i februari
- Genre: Drama
- Created by: Anders Weidemann
- Starring: Lotta Tejle; Kjell Bergqvist; Kjell Wilhelmsen; Duangjai Phiao Hiransri; Maria Lundqvist; Hanna Ardéhn
- Country of origin: Sweden
- Original languages: Swedish; English; Thai
- No. of series: 2
- No. of episodes: 20

Production
- Producers: Håkan Hammarén; Lars Pettersson; Anders Weidemann; Martin Persson
- Production locations: Thailand; Sweden
- Running time: 60 minutes
- Production companies: Fundament Film; SVT Anagram

Original release
- Network: SVT1
- Release: 6 February 2012 – present

30 Degrees in February (Swedish: 30 grader i februari) is a Swedish drama series produced for television, airing originally on the SVT network and distributed internationally on Netflix. The series was created by Anders Weidemann and produced by Håkan Hammarén at Fundament Film. The first season debuted on February 6, 2012 and the second season premiered on February 1, 2016 and was produced by Anagram in co-production with SVT and Film i Vast.

The series depicts the lives of various Swedish citizens who moved to Thailand. The series was filmed on location in and around Phuket, with additional scenes filmed in Sweden. The series airs primarily in Swedish, with some scenes in English and Thai.

It was part of a feature at the 2016 Gothenburg Film Festival to highlight the increasing popularity of Scandinavian television series abroad. The first season won Swedish television awards (Kristallen) in 2012, including for best drama series. It also received an International Emmy Award nomination in 2013 in the Best Actress category, for Lotta Tejle, who plays Majlis.

== Plot ==
=== Season 1 ===
The series weaves three separate stories of Swedes who embark on a new beginning in Thailand.

Kajsa (Maria Lundqvist) is a divorced workaholic who suffers a stroke and decides to move to Thailand with her daughters Joy and Wilda. They travel to a hotel on a remote beach where they had once visited on holiday. Once they find it to be closed, Kajsa decides to buy it, but she clashes with Chan the former owner who wants it back. Meanwhile, her daughter Joy falls in love with Chan's son Pong.

Majlis (Lotta Tejle) visits Thailand with her grumpy and verbally abusive wheelchair-using husband Bengt (Kjell Bergqvist). Although Majlis is enchanted by the place and wants to stay, her husband wants to leave.

Glenn (Kjell Wilhelmsen) is a lonely 45-year old blue collar worker who dreams of having a wife and children. After repeatedly being rejected by women in Sweden, he decides to search for a new wife in Thailand. His search is complicated when he meets the transgender masseuse Oh (Duangjai Phiao Hiransri).

=== Season 2 ===
Joy and Wilda's father travels from Sweden to search for them with the intention of bringing them back home. Majlis is on the run from the authorities, and Glenn and Oh struggle with whether they can have a future together.

== Cast ==
- Kjell Bergqvist (Bengt)
- Lotta Tejle (Majlis)
- Maria Lundqvist (Kajsa)
- Hanna Ardéhn (Joy)
- Viola Weidemann (Wilda)
- Thomas Chaanhing (Chan)
- Sanong Sudla (Pong)
- Kjell Wilhelmsen (Glenn)
- Duangjai Hiransri (Oh)
- Sumontha "Joom" Sounpoirarat (Dit)
- Björn Bengtsson (Bengt Jr)
- Torkel Petersson (Johnny)
- Rebecka Hemse (Sara)
- Björn Kjellman (Anders)
- Linus Wahlgren (Johan)
- Namfon Phetsut (Teng)
