= A Part of You =

2024 Swedish coming-of-age drama film by Sigge Eklund

- Release poster
- Swedish: En del av dig
- Directed by: Sigge Eklund
- Written by: Michaela Hamilton
- Produced by: Stefan H. Lindén; Alexandra Thönnersten
- Starring: Felicia Maxime; Edvin Ryding; Zara Larsson
- Cinematography: Josephine Owe
- Edited by: Sarah Patient Nicastro
- Music by: Oskar Rindborg; Wilhelm Börjesson
- Production company: SF Studios
- Distributed by: Netflix
- Release date: May 31, 2024
- Running time: 109 minutes
- Country: Sweden
- Language: Swedish

A Part of You (Swedish: En del av dig) is a 2024 Swedish coming-of-age drama film directed by Sigge Eklund in his feature-length directorial debut and starring Felicia Maxime, Edvin Ryding and Zara Larsson (in her film debut).

The story follows Agnes, a 17-year-old Swedish teenager overshadowed by her charismatic and popular older sister Julia. Admiring Julia's qualities, Agnes begins to emulate her sister's life and social circle, leading to unforeseen challenges.

It was released by Netflix on May 31, 2024.

== Plot ==
17-year-old student Agnes lives in a Swedish town with her family. She often feels overshadowed by her older sister, Julia, who has a fun personality, is popular, has tons of friends, and dates a boyfriend that every girl dreams of. Yet, Agnes deeply admires all these qualities in her sister. However, everything changes when Julia dies in a car accident after leaving a party and arguing with her boyfriend, Noel. From that point on, Agnes starts mingling with Julia's social circle, even going so far as to imitate her in every way from wearing the same clothes to pursuing a romantic relationship with Noel. This begins to stir rejection from those closest to Julia, including their own parents.

== Cast ==
- Felicia Maxime as Agnes Svan
- Edvin Ryding as Noel
- Zara Larsson as Julia Svan
- Ida Engvoll as Carina
- Mustafa Al-Mashhadani as Amir
- Alva Bratt as Esther
- Emil Hedayat as Sam
- Olivia Essén as Fanna
- Nikki Hanselblad as Lydia
- Maxwell Cunningham as Adrian Hagerfors

== Production ==
On March 31, 2023, Netflix announced that Swedish author and podcast host Sigge Eklund would make his film directing debut with a coming-of-age drama titled A Part Of You, written by screenwriter Michaela Hamilton, while producers would be Stefan H. Lindén and Alexandra Thönnersten from SF Studios. On May 13, 2023, Netflix reported that Felicia Maxime, Edvin Ryding and Zara Larsson would star in the film in the roles of Agnes, Noel, and Julia, while the supporting cast includes Ida Engvoll, Mustafa Al-Mashhadani, Alva Bratt, Emil Hedayat, Olivia Essén, Nikki Hanselblad and Maxwell Cunningham.

Principal photography took place in Stockholm in May 2023.

== Reception ==
On the review aggregator website Rotten Tomatoes, 80% of 5 critics' reviews are positive.

Taylor Gates of Collider wrote: "The film offers a sophisticated, nuanced coming-of-age story with stunning cinematography and thoughtful direction" and "Felicia Maxime's performance shines, showcasing her range and ability to portray complex emotions." Writing for Decider, John Serba gave the film a positive review, saying that: "A Part of You sets its hook early with the first-act tragedy, then intrigues us with Agnes’ subsequent borderline-disturbed, but never wholly implausible actions."

== See also ==
- List of Swedish films of the 2020s
