= Hanna Ardéhn =

Swedish actress (born 1995)

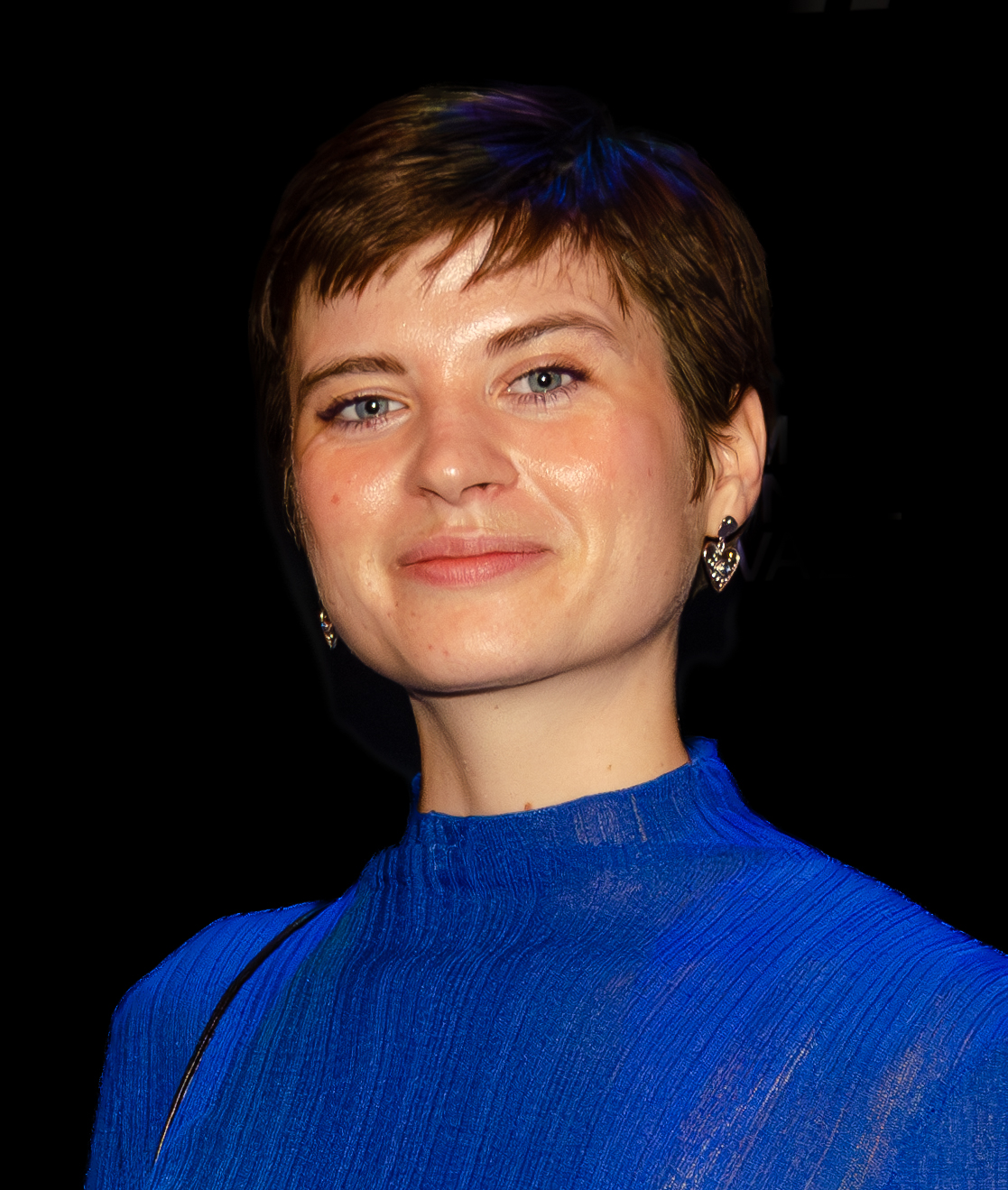
- Hanna Ardéhn in 2023
- Born: 4 October 1995 (age 30); Åkersberga, Sweden
- Education: Linköping University
- Occupation: Actress
- Awards: Best Actress Kristallen (2019)

Hanna Margareta Ardéhn (born 4 October 1995) is a Swedish actress. She is best known for her role as Maja Norberg in the first Swedish Netflix original series Quicksand, which premiered on 5 April 2019.

== Biography ==
Hanna Ardéhn has appeared in TV productions Nio med JO, Dubbelliv, and 30 Degrees in February as well as the short film Lidingöligan which won the short story film award. She grew up in the northern suburbs of Stockholm, Sweden and at a young age she became interested in movies and acting. She started acting in a small theatre group for children when she was six years old and continued until she was 18 years old. In 2010 she got her first film role in the movie 7X - Lika barn leka bäst. This further cemented her enthusiasm for acting, which later led to a role in the Swedish drama 30 Degrees in February.

Ardéhn graduated with a Master of Science degree in psychology from Linköping University in September 2020. She is hoping to be able to combine her psychology degree with an acting career in the future.

== Career ==
In 2018, Ardéhn was cast in the main role of Maja Norberg on the Netflix crime drama Quicksand. The series is inspired by the novel of the same name written by Malin Persson Giolito and is the first Swedish produced original series for Netflix. The series premiered on 5 April 2019. For her performance in the series, she earned praise from critics and won Best Actress Kristallen in 2019.

== Filmography ==
- 2007 - Lidingöligan (film)
- 2008 - Nio med JO (TV Series)
- 2010 - Dubbelliv (TV - Season 1) as Amanda
- 2010 - 7X - Lika barn leka bäst (film) as Martina
- 2012 - 30 Degrees in February (Swedish: 30 grader i februari) (TV - Season 1) as Joy
- 2012 - Dubbelliv (TV - Season 2)
- 2015 - Krigarnas Ö (film) as Nicke
- 2015 - 30 Degrees in February (TV - Season 2) as Joy
- 2019 - Quicksand (Netflix Series) as Maja Norberg
- 2020 - Maria Wern (TV Series) as Isabell
- 2022 - Riding in Darkness (TV Series) as Victoria
- 2022 - The Playlist (Netflix Series) as Lisa
- 2022 - A Storm for Christmas (TV Series) (Netflix Series) as Diana
- 2023 - Leva Life (TV Series) as Nora Rylander
