= Edvin Ryding =

Swedish actor (born 2003)

- Born: Lars Edvin Folke Ryding; 4 February 2003 (age 23); Stockholm, Sweden
- Occupation: Actor
- Years active: 2009–present

Lars Edvin Folke Ryding (born 4 February 2003) is a Swedish actor. He is best known for his starring role as Prince Wilhelm in the Netflix teen drama series Young Royals (2021–2024). He featured on the Forbes 30 Under 30 Europe list of 2022.

== Career ==
Ryding debuted in the TV series Mannen under trappan, which was filmed when he was 5 years old. Since then he has acted in several other productions like Fröken Frimans krig, The Crown Jewels, The Stig-Helmer Story, Gåsmamman, and several of the films about Annika Bengtzon produced in 2011.

Ryding became internationally known due to his portrayal of Prince Wilhelm of Sweden in the hit Netflix series Young Royals, winning several awards, and earning nominations along with his co-star Omar Rudberg. He was featured on the Forbes 30 Under 30 Europe list of 2022.

In 2024, he appeared in the Netflix movie A Part of You, with fellow Swedish actress and singer Zara Larsson. In 2025, he made his Hollywood debut by featuring in the horror movie 28 Years Later, directed by Danny Boyle, alongside Jodie Comer. He will play Vitus, opposite Iris Apatow as Proserpina, in The Hunger Games: Sunrise on the Reaping, which is in production as of July 2025. He will also play the supporting role of Swiss hockey player Luca Haas beginning in Season 2 of Crave's romantic drama Heated Rivalry.

== Filmography ==
Key
†	Denotes films that have not yet been released

=== Film ===
Year	Title	Role	Notes	Ref.
2011	The Stig-Helmer Story			
2011	The Crown Jewels	Richard Persson		
2012	Nobel's Last Will	Kalle		
2012	Prime Time	Kalle		
2012	Studio Sex	Kalle		
2012	Den röda vargen	Kalle		
2012	Livstid	Kalle		
2012	En plats i solen	Kalle		
2013	IRL	Lillebror Jonas		
2014	Beyond Beyond	Johan	Voice	
2014	Mr. Peabody & Sherman	Mason, Tutankhamun	Voice (Swedish version)	
2014	Paddington	Jonathan	Voice (Swedish version)	
2015	Jönssonligan – Den perfekta stöten	Young Charles		
2016	Om allt vore på riktigt	Josef		
2016	Kubo and the Two Strings	Kubo	Voice (Swedish version)	
2016	Paddington 2	Jonathan	Voice (Swedish version)	
2020	Onward	Ian Lightfoot	Voice (Swedish version)	
2020	Dolittle	Stubbins	Voice (Swedish version)	
2021	Don't Look Up	Yule	Voice (Swedish version)	
2023	Avgrunden	Simon		
2024	A Part of You	Noel		
2025	28 Years Later	Erik Sundqvist		
2026	The Hunger Games: Sunrise on the Reaping	Vitus		

=== Television ===
Year	Title	Role	Notes	Ref.
2009	Mannen under trappan	Fabian Kreutz		
2013	Biciklo - Supercykeln	Valle Forslin		
2013–2017	Fröken Frimans krig	Gunnar Andersson		
2014	Bastuklubben	Young Jarmo		
2015–2025	Gåsmamman	Linus Ek	Main role	
2018	Storm på Lugna gatan	Sylvester		
2018-2024	Craig of the Creek	Craig Williams	Voice (Swedish version,1st voice)	
2019–2020	Älska mig	Viktor		
2020	High School Musical: The Musical: The Series	Ricky	Voice (Swedish version)	
2020	Maria Wern	Elliot		
2021–2024	Young Royals	Prince Wilhelm "Wille" of Sweden (later Crown Prince Wilhelm of Sweden)	Main role Also voice in English dub	
2021	Hellenius Hörna	Self		
2021	Arcane	Ekko	Voice (Swedish version)	
2023	Big Mouth	Niklas	Voice (guest role)	
2025	A Life's Worth	Johan Strand	Main role	
2027	Heated Rivalry †	Luca Haas	Supporting Role	

== Awards and nominations ==
Award	Year	Category	Nominated work	Result	Ref.
Stockholm International Film Festival	2021	Rising Star	Young Royals	Won	
Gaygalan Awards	2022	Best Duo (shared with Omar Rudberg)	Young Royals	Won	
Kristallen	2022	Best Actor	Young Royals	Won	
Gaygalan Awards	2023	TV Star of the Year		Won	
