= Riding in Darkness =

2022 Swedish drama miniseries

- Swedish: Nattryttarna
- Genre: Drama
- Screenplay by: Ulf Kvensler
- Directed by: Molly Hartleb; Julia Lindström
- Starring: Jonas Karlsson; Hanna Ardéhn; Saga Samuelsson; Malin Persson; Amanda Jansson
- Country of origin: Sweden
- Original language: Swedish
- No. of seasons: 1
- No. of episodes: 8

Original release
- Network: C More
- Release: 31 October – 12 December 2022

Riding in Darkness (Swedish: Nattryttarna, lit. 'The night riders') is an eight-episode 2022 Swedish drama miniseries, partly based on Sophie Jahn's autobiography Daddy's Girl on the Horse Farm (Swedish: Pappas flicka på hästgården). Jonas Karlsson, Hanna Ardéhn, Saga Samuelsson, Malin Persson, and Amanda Jansson appear in lead roles.

== Background ==
In 1991, a man who owned a horse farm in Ekerö was convicted of sexual crimes against five girls between the ages of 14 and 17. After a two and a half year prison term, he returned to the farm and continued operating the farm. His business also remained accredited by the National Organization of Riding Schools. Several years later, in 1994, Sveriges Television aired a documentary Dömd på förhand (English: Prejudged) alleging that the girls who accused the man of abuse had lied.

In May 2018, Sveriges Radio P1 released "Hästgården", a five-episode program about a riding instructor who was convicted of sexual crimes against his students in the 1990s, and was able to continue working even after his conviction and prison sentence. Robert Barkman and Daniel Velasco received the Swedish Grand Prize for Journalism, in the category of Storyteller of the Year, for the program. In October 2021, Sophie Jahn, the daughter of the riding instructor (who had died of cancer in 2018), published a memoir in collaboration with Marie-Anne Knutas about her childhood titled Daddy's Girl on the Horse Farm (Swedish: Pappas flicka på hästgården).

== Cast ==
=== Main ===
- Jonas Karlsson as Tommy Lund
- Hanna Ardéhn as Victoria Lund
- Saga Samuelsson as Molly Bennett
- Malin Persson as Lotta Lund
- Amanda Jansson as Frida Karlsson

=== Supporting ===
- Tehilla Blad as Agnes Lund
- Melinda Kinnaman as Katarina Rosén
- Christopher Wollter as Tomas Rosén: Katarina's husband
- Emma Comstedt as Victoria, aged 5
- Lovis Bello as Agnes, aged 4
- Jessica Liedberg as Linda: chair of the Heddesta Riding Association
- Frida Argento as Bettina Hansson
- Omeya Lundqvist-Simbizi as Petronella "Nella" Alveström: friend Molly makes at school after leaving Heddesta
- Atina Simonovic as Jenny Rosén
- Nova Salmi-Wikander as Linn Wenger
- Mi-Lou Wehrling as Malin Broström

== Episodes ==
No.	Title	Directed by	Written by	Original release date
1	"Episode 1"	Molly Hartleb	Ulf Kvensler	31 October 2022
In June 1990, Molly leaves her alcoholic mother to begin working and boarding at the Heddesta horse farm. Tommy Lund operates the riding club there; also present are his wife Lotta and daughters, Victoria and Agnes. Molly settles into her new role, assisting with the horses' upkeep and giving lessons to children. She bonds with the other stable girls—Frida and Bettina—and wins her first riding competition. Initially thrilled by her victory, Tommy is enraged to see her speaking to Heddesta's former stable girl, Malin. After the competition, Tommy leads the stable girls in a bonding activity, encouraging them to share about their troubled home lives. He instructs them to disrobe for massages, which involve inappropriate touching. Molly reports the groping to Lotta, who accuses her of lying and fires her. She later changes course, allowing Molly to stay only if she promises never to slander Tommy again. At a party for Heddesta riding club members, Tomas expresses concern about Tommy's behaviour to his wife Katarina; their daughter Jenny takes lessons at Heddesta. Molly and Frida overhear an altercation that unfolds after Lotta discovers Tommy sexually assaulting Bettina. In flashforwards, an adult Victoria reports her father to the police.
2	"Episode 2"	Molly Hartleb	Ulf Kvensler	31 October 2022
In the riding area after dark, Tommy gets drunk and forces an exhausted Molly to practice unsafe jumping, verbally berating her as she is thrown from her horse repeatedly. He later finds her in the tack room and rapes her. The next morning, Molly goes home to find her mother has already rented out her room, and returns to Heddesta. She confides in Frida and Bettina, who reveal Tommy regularly rapes them too; they agree to stay together to protect each other. However, Tommy is undeterred by their new strategy, and rapes Frida in front of Molly. Five months later, Linn—who is considerably younger than the other stable girls—seeks refuge in Molly and Frida's room after Tommy attempts to assault her. Molly decides to leave Heddesta, but cannot convince Frida to come with her. Molly returns to school, befriends Nella, and tries to move on. Upon hearing rumours that Molly was fired from Heddesta for stealing and drug use, a suspicious Katarina contacts her directly. She eventually admits to Kataraina and Tomas that Tommy was raping her. With their support Molly reports him to the police, who take Tommy away in front of Lotta and Victoria.
3	"Episode 3"	Molly Hartleb	Ulf Kvensler	7 November 2022
Frida stays with the Lunds, while Bettina, Linn, and Malin join Molly in reporting Tommy. With Tommy in custody, Lotta searches for allies; she and her daughters face disgust as their peers learn what Tommy was arrested for. Katarina and Tomas host a meeting at their home for other parents of children in the riding club; reactions are divided between those who believe the girls and those who do not. Lotta hosts her own meeting to proclaim Tommy's innocence. During the trial, the girls testify about their abuse. Tommy denies all the allegations, claiming Molly sexually pursued him and was fired for stealing. Frida testifies in Tommy's defence, and explicitly denies being raped in front of Molly in the car. Just as the case seems poised to fall apart, Louise—a former riding student at Heddesta—calls Katarina to report she was abused by Tommy.
4	"Episode 4"	Molly Hartleb	Ulf Kvensler	14 November 2022
The trial continues. Witnesses loyal to Tommy give damaging false testimony about Molly's character. Katarina testifies next, where she faces scrutiny during cross-examination for her friendship with Tommy's ex-wife Maria, and their financial support of Maria's attempt to take over Heddesta. Next on the stand is Louise, who provides compelling testimony about how Tommy raped her as a young girl. Tommy clashes with his lawyer, who he feels is not cross-examining the witnesses aggressively enough. Both the prosecution and the defence give closing statements, and the verdict is delivered: Tommy has been convicted on all counts. He is sentenced to two and a half years in prison and must pay restitution to the girls. The Lunds face a business crisis; students leave and Tommy is expelled from various equestrian organisations. Tommy suggests formally turning over the business to Lotta; he drinks heavily and lashes out at his family.
5	"Episode 5"	Julia Lindström	Ulf Kvensler	21 November 2022
6	"Episode 6"	Julia Lindström	Ulf Kvensler	28 November 2022
7	"Episode 7"	Julia Lindström	Ulf Kvensler	5 December 2022
8	"Episode 8"	Julia Lindström	Ulf Kvensler	12 December 2022

== Production ==
After the case came to broader attention in the Sveriges Radio program, Ulf Kvensler met with Jahn, her younger sister, and others with knowledge of the case. He began writing the script based on the content of those interviews. Jahn collaborated with show runners on the development of the series and visited set during the production. Filming began in August 2021, mostly in Lerum.

== Reception ==
Writing for Dagens Nyheter, Wanda Bendjelloul gave the series four out of five stars. She praised Molly Hartleb and Julia Lindström's direction, and Karlsson's "skin-crawling" depiction as the "sometimes charismatic, sometimes diabolical" Tommy. She also cited Saga Samuelsson and Amanda Jansson as two standout performances. The series received a positive review from Karolina Fjellborg in Aftonbladet. Karlsson's performance as Tommy was given particular praise by Jan Andersson in Hallands Nyheter.

=== Award nominations ===
The series was nominated at Kristallen 2023 for Television Drama of the Year. Karlsson and Samuelsson also earned nominations for their individual performances. Karlsson was also nominated for an International Emmy for Best Actor.
