= Duangjai Hiransri =

Thai actress

- ดวงใจ หิรัญศรี
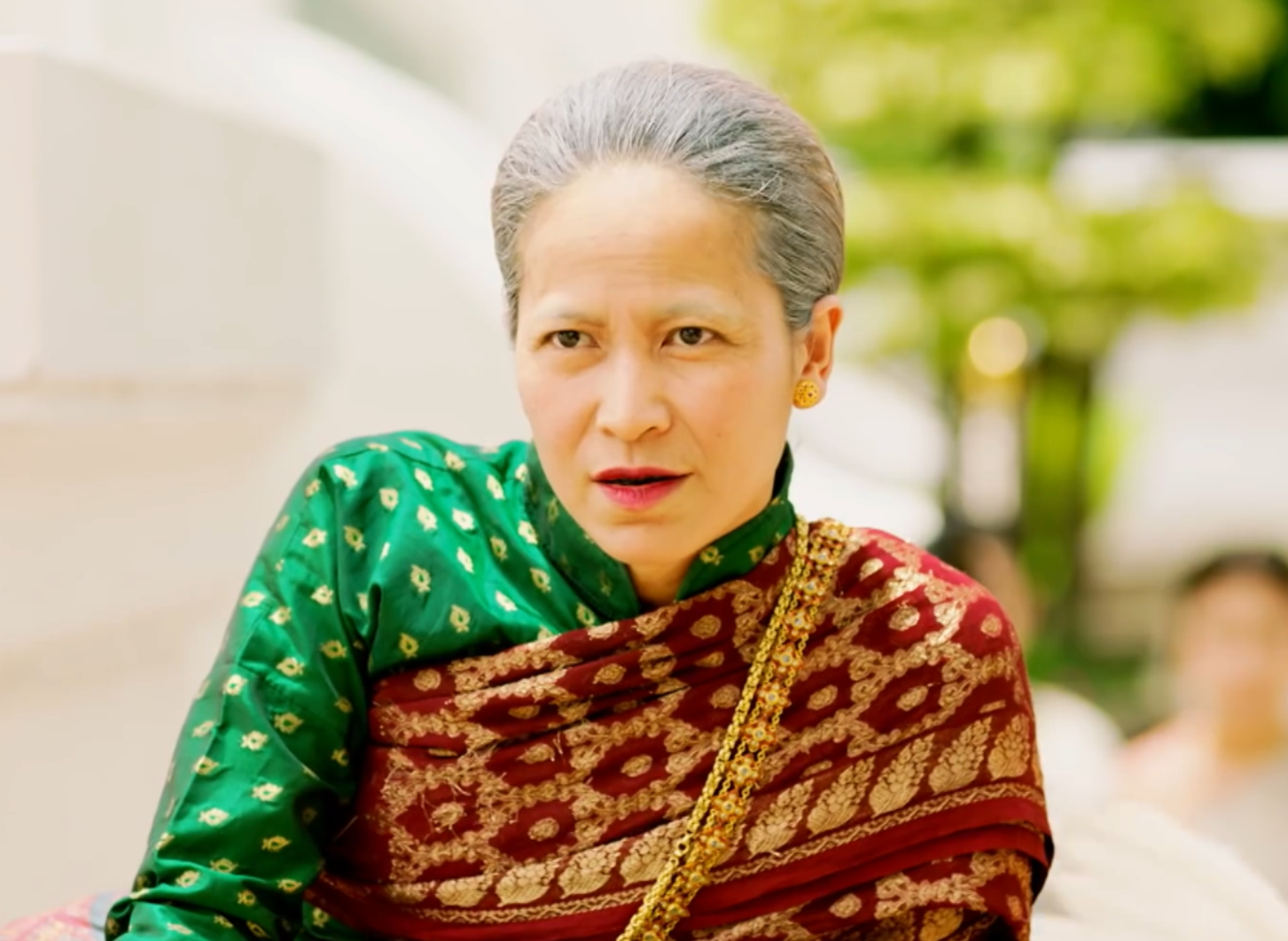
- Born: 1 January 1980 (age 46); Bangkok, Thailand
- Other name: Pure (เพียว)
- Education: Thammasat University
- Occupation: Actress
- Years active: 2000–present

Duangjai Hiransri (Thai: ดวงใจ หิรัญศรี, RTGS: Duangchai Hiransi; born 1 January 1980), nicknamed Pure (Thai: เพียว), is a Thai actress.

== Biography ==
Duangjai was born in 1980. She graduated from the Department of Theatre and Performance Practice under the Faculty of Fine and Applied Arts at Thammasat University.

She is a member of the Anatta Theatre Troupe. She is appeared in the Swedish television show 30 Degrees in February and was nominated for Best Supporting Actress by the Thailand National Film Association for her role in The Blue Hour in 2015.

== Filmography ==
=== Film ===
Year	Title	Role	Notes	Ref.
2000	Mysterious Object at Noon	Dokfa	Main role	
2007	Ma fille est innocente	Mei Lin	Supporting role, TV movie	
2014	The Last Executioner	Duangjai	Supporting role	
2014	Patong Girl	Plaa (Fai's sister)	Supporting role	
2015	The Blue Hour	Tam's mother	Supporting role	
2016	Take Me Home	Chom	Supporting role	
2017	The Promise	Mon's mother	Supporting role	
2023	Not Friends	Joe's mother	Supporting role	
2024	Under Parallel Skies	Pimchan	Supporting role	
2025	Sokaphiwat		Supporting role	
2025	Death Whisperer 3	The Crone	Supporting role	

=== Television series ===
Year	Title	Role	Network	Notes	Ref.
2012–2016	30 Degrees in February	Oh	SVT1	Supporting role	
2015	Thirteen Terrors	Tam's mother	GMM 25	Supporting role	
2017	Sri Ayodhaya	Tao Song Kan Dan	True4U	Supporting role	
2019	Abandoned	Singh's mother	Line TV	Guest role	
2019	Sri Ayodhaya 2	Tao Song Kan Dan	True4U	Supporting role	
2021	Let's Fight Ghost	Monk Orn	True4U	Guest role	
2021	May–December Romance	Jurairat Leidpongsathon (Jum)	Channel 3 HD	Supporting role	
2021	Baker Boys	Karn (Tum Tam's mother)	GMM 25	Supporting role	
2022	From Chao Phraya to Irrawaddy	Princess Mongkut	Thai PBS	Supporting role	
2022	Something in My Room	Nuan	Channel 3 HD	Supporting role	
2022	A Cunning Destiny	Phatcha's mother	Channel 3 HD	Cameo	
2022	The Eclipse	Akk's mother	GMM 25	Guest role	
2022	Magic of Zero: Zero in the Moonlight	Maki's mother	GMM 25	Supporting role	
2022	Thai Cave Rescue	Tle's mother	Netflix	Cameo	
2022	Finding the Rainbow	Win's mother	Viu	Supporting role	
2022	609 Bedtime Story	Dew's mother	WeTV	Supporting role	
2023	Boyband	Jantra Roadsiri (JooJoo's mother)	GMM 25	Cameo	
2023	Nakak	Nilubon (Mim's mother)	Thai PBS	Supporting role	
2023	I Feel You Linger in the Air	Prik	One 31	Supporting role	
2024	Your Sky	Oh's mother	One 31	Supporting role	
2024	Spare Me Your Mercy	Rawiwan Khambunrueang (Wasan's mother)	One 31	Guest role (Ep. 1, 8)	
2025	Captive Heart	Mae Cham	Channel 3 HD	Supporting role	
2025	Memoir of Rati	Buaphan	GMM 25	Supporting role	
2026	Be My Angel	Jane's mother	IQIYI	Guest role	
2026	Love of Silom	Pilai (Wayu's mother)	WeTV	Supporting role	
2026	Whisper of Desire	Aunt Pon	One 31	Cameo	
2026	Match Point	Bay's mother	GMM 25	Supporting role	
