= Klas Eklund =

Swedish economist and author (born 1952)

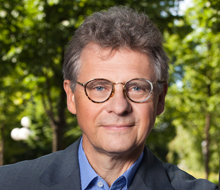
- Eklund in 2015
- Born: 16 July 1952 (age 73); Uppsala, Sweden
- Education: Stockholm School of Economics; Stockholm University
- Occupations: Economist; author
- Political party: Social Democratic (1978–2003); Independent (2003–present)
- Spouse: Pernilla Ström (m. 1992; div. 2016)
- Children: Sigge; Fredrik
- Parents: Bengt Eklund; Fylgia Zadig
- Website: klaseklund.se

Klas Eklund (born 16 July 1952) is a Swedish economist and author.

== Early life and education ==
Eklund was born in Kvarngärdet, Uppsala as the son of the actor couple Bengt Eklund (1925–1998) and Fylgia Zadig (1921–1994). He went to high school in Stockholm, but also spent his senior year at Wausau Senior High in Wisconsin, USA. He completed a BA degree in economics from the Stockholm School of Economics, where he later completed a Licentiate degree. He also has a degree in economic history and Russian from the Stockholm University.

== Career ==
Since January 2018, Klas Eklund is the Senior Economist of the law firm Mannheimer Swartling. From 1982 until 1990, Eklund was employed in the Swedish Ministry of Finance, where he finally held the position of deputy under-secretary of state, and in the Prime Minister's Office, where he was an economic policy adviser and speechwriter to the PM. He was one of the closest collaborators of Kjell-Olof Feldt, the then Minister of Finance, and was seen as one of the leading modernisers of the Swedish Social Democratic party. He has chaired several government commissions, including the Swedish Productivity Advisory Panel and "The commission to enhance the efficiency of the public sector". Eklund was also the secretary of a joint effort from the labour movement to write a strategic vision of the future beyond the welfare state (1989). He has served as an economic policy adviser to the European Commission, and participated in an international expert group which in 2009 published a plan for China's climate policy.

From 1994 to 2007 he was the chief economist of Skandinaviska Enskilda Banken, one of the largest banks in Scandinavia. From 2007 to 2015, he was the bank's Senior Economist. From 2016 to 2017 he was SEB's Sustainability Economist. In 2009, he was appointed adjunct Professor of economics, University of Lund. He is on a number of boards including the Sixth General Pension Fund, and Mistra, a government-funded foundation for environmental research. In 2011, he was appointed member of the Swedish government's "Commission for the Future", chaired by the Prime Minister. In 2015 he chaired another Government commission on the future of the labour market.

In 2010, Eklund received the first Jacob Palmstierna award for economic writing. In 2012 he was ranked the most influential person in Sweden as regards sustainability issues. He was also selected as a member of the Royal Swedish Academy of Engineering Sciences IVA. In 2017, he was awarded His Majesty the King's gold medal for "outstanding services as an economist".

His many publications include the textbook Vår ekonomi. En introduktion till samhällsekonomin ("Our Economy: An Introduction to Economics"), which so far has been published in 14 Swedish editions and is translated into both Russian and Chinese. He has published some 1,000 articles in different magazines and newspapers. He has written books on taxes, globalisation and growth. Eklund has also published a book on climate change, "Vårt klimat" ("Our Climate", 2009), a biography of former Swedish PM Olof Palme (2010, as part of a big history project with biographies of all Swedish Prime Ministers since 1900), and a book about China's economic and political development (2011). His most recent books are about innovation policy ("A framework for innovation policy", 2012) and economic growth ("Growth", 2015).

Apart from economic and political publications, Eklund has written the political thriller Läckan ("The Leak", 1990) which was made into a TV series, broadcast on Swedish national television in 1994.

== Personal life ==
Eklund is married and lives in Southern Stockholm. His elder son Sigge Eklund is a novelist and screenwriter, and his younger son is Fredrik Eklund, a real estate broker and reality show TV star.
