= Ellen Nyman =

Swedish actress, performance artist and theatre director

- Born: 21 December 1971 (age 54); Eritrea

Ellen Nyman (born 21 December 1971) is a Swedish actress, performance artist and theatre director.

Nyman was born in Eritrea and grew up in Stockholm, Sweden. She attended the Århus Theatre School in Denmark 1993-1997. Since her graduation, she has worked within theater, film, performance art, and television in both Denmark and Sweden. Nyman has performed with The Royal Danish Theatre, The Betty Nansen Theatre, Malmö City Theatre and in Henning Mankell’s play Lampedus and many more.

Parallel to her acting, Nyman runs a political art project called SPACECAMPAIGN, which includes posters and t-shirts, plus activities such as talks, fictitious articles and performance art. The aim is to nuance the mass media conceptions of, ethnic minorities.

Nyman has been a regular cast member of several TV-shows such as the Danish dramas At the Faber (season 4) and the 1st season of Forsvar, the Swedish mini-series Om ett hjärta plus minor roles in crime dramas Wallander and The Bridge.

Today she lives in Stockholm, but resided in Copenhagen for many years. Through her art, she commented on the right-wing populist Danish People's Party in various ways, including singing the Danish National Anthem on election night, while wrapped in a tablecloth from IKEA (to look more like the stereotypical Eritrean woman) to the party's leader Pia Kjaersgaard. The party holds that Denmark is not naturally a country of immigration, and that it has never been so. The party also does not accept a multi-ethnic transformation of Denmark, and rejects multiculturalism".

In 2012, Nyman directed A Performance of Swedish Arms Exports (En föreställning om svensk vapenexport) at Teater Tribunalen. The goal was to initiate a national referendum on Swedish arms export.
