= Ida Engvoll =

Swedish actress (born 1985)

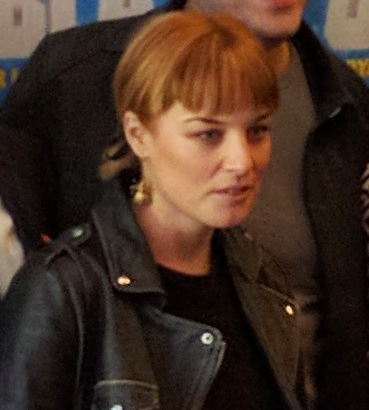
- Born: 6 October 1985 (age 40)
- Occupation: Actress
- Years active: 2009-present

Ida Engvoll (born 6 October 1985) is a Swedish actress. She has appeared in more than fifteen films since 2009.

== Biography ==
Engvoll was born in Söderhamn Municipality, Sweden, and grew up in Stråtjära in Hälsingland. She received theater and music-oriented education at Torsbergsgymnasiet in Bollnäs, attended Wendelsberg Folk High School, and studied classical music at Birkagården (the residential academy founded by Natanael Beskow).

Engvoll then studied at the Swedish National Academy of Mime and Acting from 2007 to 2010. She also worked as co-editor of the theater theoretical anthology Att gestalta kön (To shape gender) at that time.

Engvoll has played several acclaimed roles at Stockholm City Theater since 2010 and has also been active at the Royal Dramatic Theater and played in several films and TV series. She is known for starring in TV4's film adaptations of Åsa Larsson's series of books about lawyer Rebecca Martinsson. In 2015, she starred in the film A Man Called Ove.

== Selected filmography ==
Film
Year	Title	Role	Notes
2024	A Part of You	Carina	
2023	Paradise Is Burning	Hanna	
2021	Vitt Skräp	Kim	
2016	Upp i det blå	Miss Il	
2015	A Man Called Ove	Sonja	Oscar Nominee - Best Foreign Language Film
2014	For Better and Worse	Hanna	
2014	Medicinen	Linda	
2013	Crimes of Passion	Lil	
2013	Bäst före	Katja	
2013	Nobody Owns Me (Mig äger ingen)	Lisa	
2010	Beck – Levande begravd	Maria Fors	

TV
Year	Title	Role	Notes
2025	Blindspår	Hanne Wilhelmsen	
2022	The Kingdom (miniseries)	Kalle	5 episodes, 2022
2020	Love and Anarchy	Sofie Rydman	Netflix's Swedish language Series
2018	Vår tid är nu (The Restaurant)	Ester	16 Episodes, 2017-2019
2017–2020	Rebecka Martinsson (TV-series)	Rebecka Martinsson	
2017	Bonusfamiljen	Therese	5 episodes
2015	The Team	Kit Ekdal	
2015	The Bridge	Tina Matsson	3 episodes
