= Gävle Mosque =

Mosque in Gävle, Sweden

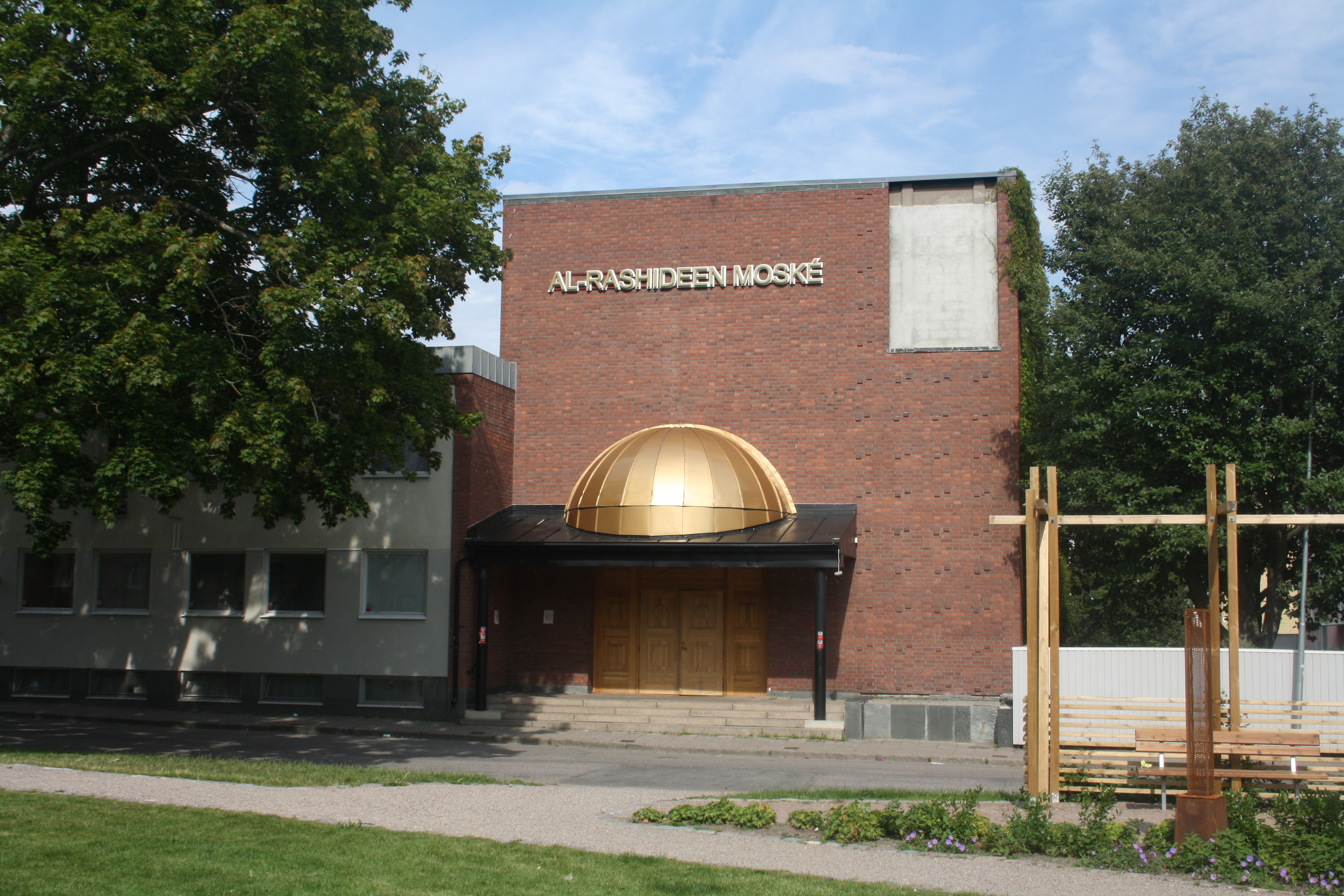
- Mosque exterior in 2016

Religion
- Affiliation: Islam
- Sect: Sunni

Location
- Municipality: Gävle Municipality
- Country: Sweden
- Interactive map of Gävle Mosque
- Coordinates: 60.668778°N 17.151778°E

The Al-Rashideen Mosque, commonly known as the Gävle Mosque is a mosque in Gävle, Sweden, located in the outskirts of the city's old town. The building, originally a church, was purchased in 2008 and renovated with financing from a Qatari foundation. It was attacked with arson in 2016, but the fire was quickly extinguished.

The mosque has been the subject of controversy due to former imam Abo Raad's alleged connections with Islamism. By 2023, it had new leadership, although reporting has suggested a continued relationship with another controversial imam, Fekri Hamad.

== History ==
The building was purchased for use as a Sunni mosque in March 2008 for 5,150,000 SEK from the Methodist Church. The project was financed by the Sheik Eid Mohammad Al-Thani Charity Organization from Qatar.

In September 2015, Gävle-based liberal newspaper Gefle Dagblad received a bomb threat after reporting on alleged connections between the mosque and the Islamic State. The person who called in the threat demanded the newspaper remove an article about imam Abo Raad from their website. No bomb was ultimately found.

The mosque was attacked with arson on 29 April 2016. The fire was quickly extinguished.

In 2017, Abo Raad's son Raad al-Duhan was convicted of threatening journalist Anna Gullberg, who was then the editor-in-chief of Gefle Dagblad.

Abo Raad was taken into custody in April 2018 after SÄPO determined him to be a security threat. In August, he was charged with unlawful coercion after a journalist from Gefle Dagblad reported being forced to delete photographs. That charge was later dropped. The Swedish Migration Agency decided to deport Abo Raad in 2019.

As of 2023, the mosque had acquired different leadership and stated they wanted to "turn over a new leaf." Although the new board said that deported imam Fekri Hamad was prohibited from lecturing, videos showed he was still active in the mosque.
