= John Gomes (businessman) =

American luxury real estate broker

- Born: John Gomes
- Occupations: Real estate broker, entrepreneur

John Gomes is an American luxury real estate broker, entrepreneur, and businessman based in New York City. Alongside his business partner, Fredrik Eklund, he operates brokerages in Manhattan and Sweden. They have continually appeared on the Bravo television series, Million Dollar Listing New York. Gomes and Frederik Eklund were voted the top agents in New York City by The Real Deal in 2014.

== Early years ==
Gomes attended the University of Rhode Island and attained a Bachelor of Arts degree in Political Science and Communication Studies. He also holds an MBA in Entrepreneurship from Baruch College.

== Career ==
Gomes, along with his real estate partner Fredrik Eklund, sell luxury apartments, buildings, and developments in both New York City and Sweden. Their real estate group has been selling since 2005.

Gomes appeared on the HGTV series, Selling New York. In 2010, his real estate team left the network to appear on Bravo's Million Dollar Listing New York.

In 2012, his real estate team grossed US$5.3 million in commissions.

== Awards in Real Estate ==
- Pinnacle Club Award
