= Tom Alandh =

Swedish journalist and documentary director

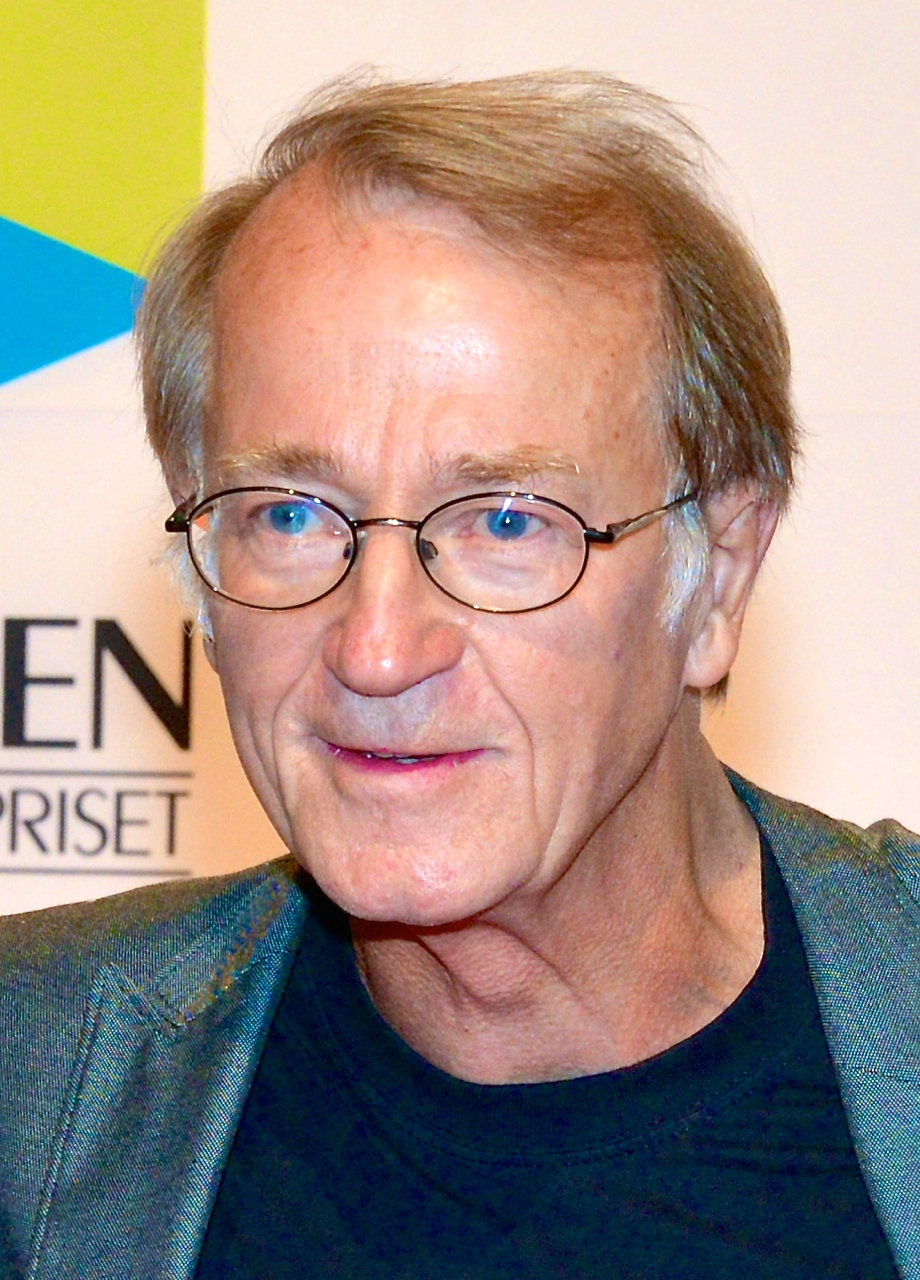
- Alandh in 2013
- Born: 13 June 1944 (age 82); Stockholm, Sweden
- Occupation: director
- Known for: Nacka– myten och människan (1987); Cornelis (1998); Det sista örådet (2004)

Tom Hardy Alandh (born 13 June 1944) is a Swedish journalist and documentary director.

Alandh studied journalism between 1969 and 1970. In 1972 he began working for SVT as a reporter and producer. Since 1981 he has produced close to one hundred documentary films for Swedish public service television. He rose to prominence with his 1987 breakthrough TV documentary about the rise and fall of football star Nacka Skoglund. In 1987, Alandh was awarded the Stora Journalistpriset. In 2011 he received an honourable award at the television gala Kristallen.
