= Bengt Eklund =

Swedish actor (1925–1998)

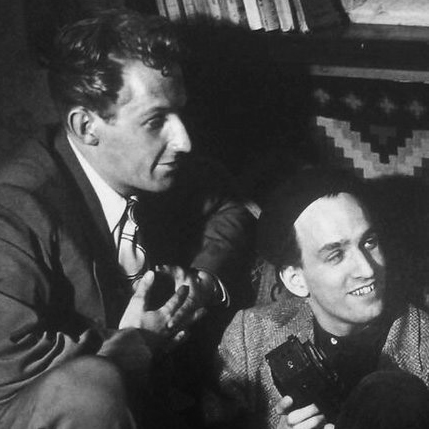
- Eklund and Ingmar Bergman, 1948.
- Born: Bengt Gunnar Eklund; 18 January 1925; Stockholm, Sweden
- Died: 19 January 1998 (aged 73); Stockholm, Sweden
- Years active: 1946–1990
- Spouse: Fylgia Zadig (m. 1960–1965)
- Children: Klas Eklund; Lena Eklund
- Relatives: Sigge Eklund (grandson); Fredrik Eklund (grandson)

Bengt Gunnar Eklund (18 January 1925 – 19 January 1998) was a Swedish actor. He is well known as Nisse Granqvist in the 1964 TV series Vi på Saltkråkan.

Eklund worked for many years at the Royal Dramatic Theatre in Stockholm, but also made a large number of roles in movies and television, including Ingmar Bergman's Summer with Monika (1953) and Shame (1968), and Gustaf Molander's film Sir Arne's Treasure (1954; based on the novel by Selma Lagerlöf).

Eklund was married to actress Fylgia Zadig. He was the father of economist Klas Eklund and grandfather of novelist Sigge Eklund and real estate broker Fredrik Eklund.

== Selected filmography ==
- Thirst (1949)
- The Kiss on the Cruise (1950)
- Skipper in Stormy Weather (1951)
- In the Arms of the Sea (1951)
- Dance, My Doll (1953)
- Night Child (1956)
- Laila (1958)
- Crime in Paradise (1959)
