= My Brother (TV series) =

2025 Swedish drama television series

- Swedish: Jag for ner till bror
- Based on: My Brother by Karin Smirnoff
- Screenplay by: Karin Arrhenius
- Directed by: Sanna Lenken
- Starring: Amanda Jansson; Rasmus Johansson; Jakob Öhrman
- Country of origin: Sweden
- Original language: Swedish

Original release
- Network: SVT Play
- Release: 26 December 2025

My Brother (Swedish: Jag for ner till bror, lit. 'I traveled down to my brother') is a four-episode 2025 Swedish drama series, based on Karin Smirnoff's 2018 debut novel of the same name. The series stars Amanda Jansson, Rasmus Johansson, and Jakob Öhrman. It premiered 26 December 2025 on SVT Play and the following day on SVT1. The series' setting, the fictional town of Smalånger, was inspired by Hertsånger in the Robertsfors Municipality, but most filming took place in the Luleå Municipality, including sites near Älvsbyn and Råneå. Filming was underway by March 2025. The series earned an average rating of 3.8/5 based on 14 critics on the Swedish review aggregator site Kritiker.

== Cast ==
- Amanda Jansson as Jana Kippo
- Rasmus Johansson as Bror Kippo
- Jakob Öhrman as John Brännström

== Episodes ==
No.	Title	Directed by	Written by	Original release date
1	"Episode 1"	Sanna Lenken	Karin Arrhenius	26 December 2025
Jana returns to her childhood home in Smalånger, Västerbotten, during a snowstorm and is given refuge by a man named John. While at his house, she notices paintings of a woman and his facial scars from a car accident. Jana reunites with her alcoholic brother, Bror, who has quit his job to care for their mother, whose deathbed wish is reconciliation with Jana. Although they disagree over their mother’s culpability, the siblings bond over memories of a traumatic childhood involving a sadistic father and a passive mother. Determined to get their lives on track, Jana cleans the dilapidated house and secures a job in home care, taking over the role previously held by Bror’s late partner, Maria. The townspeople are shocked by her return; Jana left abruptly in year nine. Despite warnings from locals and Bror to stay away from John, Jana begins a sexual relationship with him, later discovering the woman in his paintings was his wife. Bror bursts into John’s home, accusing him of murdering Maria. John claims Maria died after they separated, but Bror remains convinced it was not suicide. Jana tells Bror to stop drinking; he says she should stop sleeping with a murderer.
2	"Episode 2"	Sanna Lenken	Karin Arrhenius	26 December 2025
3	"Episode 3"	Sanna Lenken	Karin Arrhenius	26 December 2025
4	"Episode 4"	Sanna Lenken	Karin Arrhenius	26 December 2025
