= Fylgia Zadig =

Swedish actress

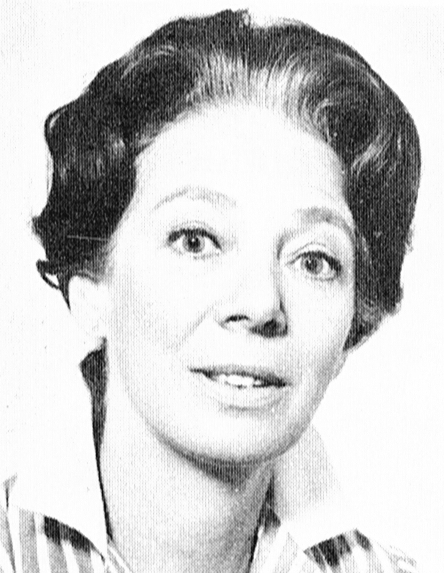
- Born: Fylgia Ester Zadig; 3 November 1921; Malmö, Sweden
- Died: 3 September 1994 (aged 72); Vejbystrand, Sweden
- Years active: 1943–1991
- Spouse: Bengt Eklund (m. 1960–1965)
- Children: Klas Eklund; Lena Eklund
- Relatives: Sigge Eklund (grandson); Fredrik Eklund (grandson)

Fylgia Ester Zadig (3 November 1921 - 3 September 1994) was a Swedish actress. Born in Malmö, Zadig was employed with the Uppsala stadsteater (Uppsala city theatre) and the Nya teatern in Stockholm.

She had roles in numerous Swedish films. She was married to actor Bengt Eklund and is the mother of economist Klas Eklund and grandmother to novelist Sigge Eklund and real estate broker Fredrik Eklund.

== Selected filmography ==
- My People Are Not Yours (1944)
- Man's Woman (1945)
- Youth in Danger (1946)
- The People of Simlang Valley (1947)
- The Street (1949)
- The Kiss on the Cruise (1950)
- Jack of Hearts (1950)
- Customs Officer Bom (1951)
- The Song of the Scarlet Flower (1956)
- On a Bench in a Park (1960)
- City of My Dreams (1976)
