= Luleå Theatre Academy =

Drama school in Luleå, Sweden

Luleå Theatre Academy (Swedish: Teaterhögskolan i Luleå) is a Swedish drama school in Luleå and part of the Luleå University of Technology.

On 29 June 1995, it was announced that Luleå would be getting its own drama school, the fourth overall established in Sweden. The school was a joint project between Luleå University and Norrbotten Theater, and began operating in the autumn of 1996. As of 2003, it was the third-most expensive education program in Sweden.

It was the first drama school in Norrland on a university level. It is situated next to the Norrbotten Theater House and thereby has close cooperation with them.

== Notable alumni ==
- Lisa Werlinder (graduated 2000)
- Gloria Tapia (graduated 2003)
- Amanda Jansson (graduated 2016)
