= Fredrik Eklund =

Swedish businessman and actor

- Born: April 26, 1977 (age 49); Akalla, Stockholm, Sweden
- Other name: Tag Eriksson
- Education: Stockholm School of Economics
- Occupations: Real Estate Salesperson, TV Personality
- Spouse: Derek Kaplan (m. 2013)
- Children: 3
- Website: http://www.fredrikeklund.com/

Fredrik Eklund (born April 26, 1977) is a Swedish real estate broker, former IT entrepreneur, reality television star, and author. He is best known for starring in the Bravo reality series, Million Dollar Listing New York for all of its nine seasons. In 2015, Eklund released his book The Sell: The Secrets of Selling Anything to Anyone, which made The New York Times Best Seller list.

== Early life and education ==
Eklund is the son of Klas Eklund, a senior economist at Swedish bank SEB, and brother of author Sigge Eklund. His paternal grandparents were Swedish actors Bengt Eklund and Fylgia Zadig.

Eklund had his first American experience as a foreign exchange student in Edina, Minnesota, where he attended Edina High School. After finishing high school, Eklund studied at the Stockholm School of Economics, but never graduated. He has worked for the financial newspaper Finanstidningen. At the age of 23, Eklund founded an Internet company with over 45 employees, and went on to work for the investment bank SEB in Stockholm, London, Singapore, and Tokyo before beginning his work in New York City.

== Film career ==
In 2004, before arriving in New York City, Eklund acted in a number of pornographic films under the pseudonym Tag Eriksson (or Tag Ericsson). In an interview with Out Magazine, Eklund has said of this period, "It was only a week of my life, accumulated. It was spread out over a few months, so it was a very short period of my life. It was something that I tried and quickly decided that I was done with." Eklund went on to say in the interview that he is proud of who he is, that he does not regret anything, and that his past involvement in the pornographic film industry has not negatively affected his career.

== Real estate career ==
Eklund has closed over five billion dollars in residential real estate. Eklund became managing director at the New York City real estate firm CORE Group Marketing and in 2010, alongside his business partner John Gomes, managing director at Prudential Douglas Elliman, the largest real estate brokerage on the East Coast. Eklund also started the top-selling team at Elliman.

Eklund is the founder of Eklund Stockholm New York, Scandinavia's most high-end residential real estate brokerage with 50 employees and $1 billion in closed sales in 2014. He is an active member of the Real Estate Board of New York.

He co-founded Douglas Elliman's Eklund Gomes Team with John Gomes.

=== Million Dollar Listing New York ===
The New York Times featured Eklund on the front page of the "Sunday Style" section in November 2010. He is one of five New York City brokers starring in Bravo's Million Dollar Listing New York.

On January 24, 2022, Fredrik Eklund announced his departure from the Million Dollar Listing franchise.

== Personal life ==
On February 9, 2013, Eklund married artist Derek Kaplan, who was born in 1975 in Salisbury, Rhodesia (now Harare, Zimbabwe), on Little Palm Island in the Florida Keys. The couple lived in New York with their dogs Mouse and Fritzy until 2016. The couple have previously lived in Roxbury, Connecticut, in a mansion Eklund purchased. In 2020, the family relocated from New York to Los Angeles. In the summer of 2023 they moved to Miami, Florida.

Eklund and Kaplan attempted to have children through surrogacy, but the surrogate suffered a miscarriage. In November 2017, Eklund and Kaplan had twins via surrogate: a daughter and a son. They also have an older son, who is Kaplan's biological child.

Eklund has been sober since October 2020.

== See also ==
- LGBT culture in New York City
- List of LGBT people from New York City
