= In the Name of God (2024 film) =

- Directed by: Ludvig Gür
- Written by: Ludvig Gür
- Starring: Linus Wahlgren; Vilhelm Blomgren; Lisa Henni; Thomas Hanzon; Isabelle Grill; Charlie Gustafsson
- Release date: 2024
- Running time: 89 minutes
- Country: Sweden
- Language: Swedish

In the Name of God is a 2024 Swedish horror thriller film written and directed by Ludvig Gür and starring Linus Wahlgren, Vilhelm Blomgren and Lisa Henni.

== Cast ==
- Linus Wahlgren as Theodor
- Vilhelm Blomgren as Erik
- Lisa Henni as Felicia
- Thomas Hanzon as Jonas
- Charlie Gustafsson as Adam
- Isabelle Grill as Hannah
- Ines Milans as Wilma
- Kola Krause as Peter
- Matti Boustedt as Bo Lindberg
- Fredrik Hiller as Fredrik
- Ingela Lundh as Förälder
- Mattias Kindberg as Småstorpsmannen

== Production ==
In May 2023, it was announced that filming wrapped.

== Reception ==
Tyler Doupe of Dread Central awarded the film three and a quarter stars out of five.
