= Lotta Tejle =

Swedish actress

- Born: Karin Charlotta Tejle; 17 March 1960 (age 66); Västervik, Sweden
- Occupations: Actress, singer
- Years active: 1982–present
- Spouse(s): Mats Greiff (m. 1984–1988) Juan Rodríguez
- Children: 2

Lotta Tejle (born 17 March 1960) is a Swedish actress. In 2020, she had a leading role in the SVT dramedy-series Sommaren 85. She was nominated for Best Actress at the 2013 International Emmy Awards for playing Majlis in 30 Degrees in February.
