= Sigge Eklund =

Swedish writer (born 1974)

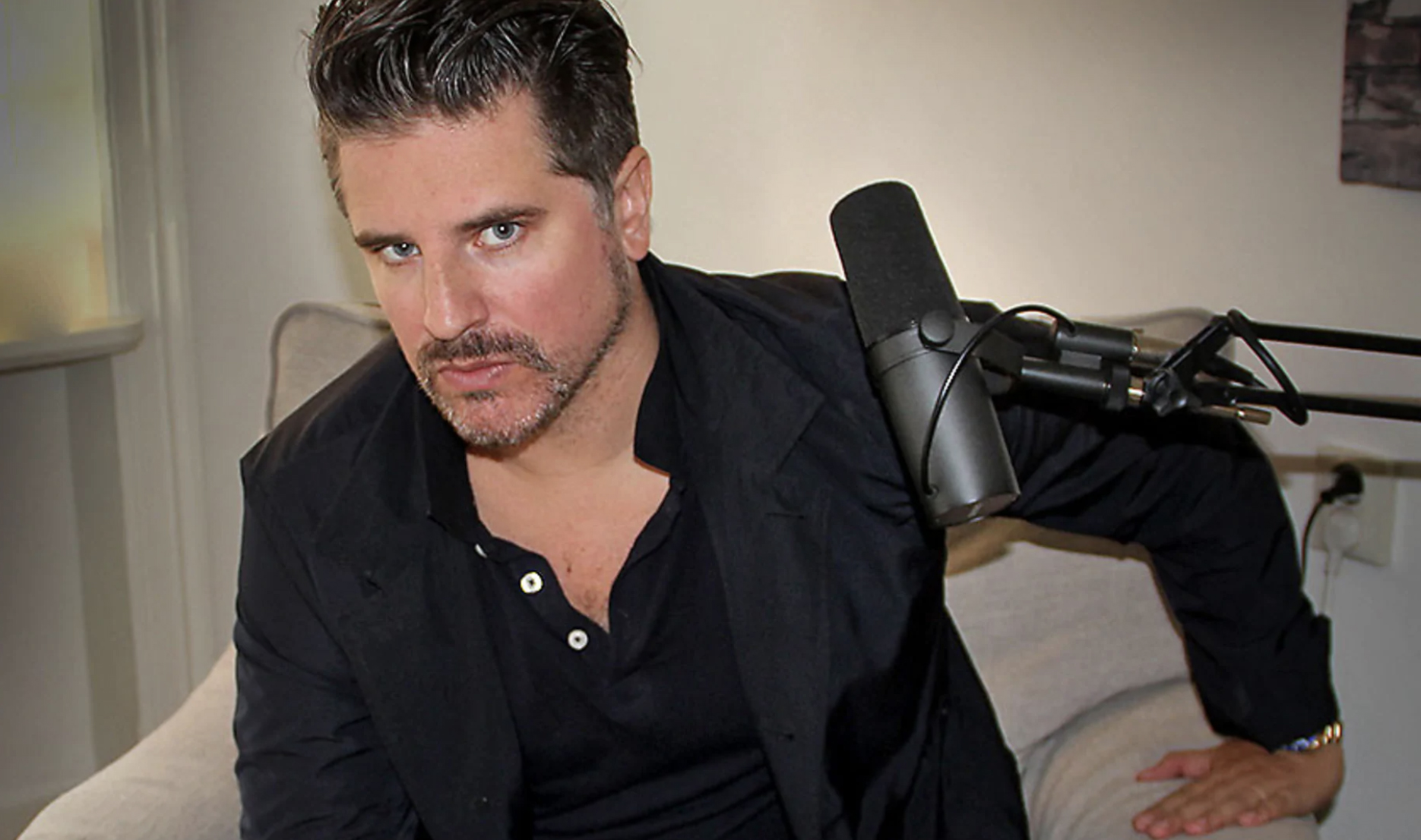
- Eklund in 2020
- Born: Sigvard Viggo Eklund; 21 April 1974 (age 52); Stockholm, Sweden
- Spouse: Malin Eklund
- Children: Viggo; Truls; Belle
- Relatives: Bengt Eklund; Klas Eklund; Fredrik Eklund; Fylgia Zadig
- Writing career
- Period: 1999–
- Notable works: Synantrop; Det är 1988 och har precis börjat snöa
- Website: www.siggeeklund.se

Sigvard Viggo "Sigge" Eklund (born 21 April 1974) is a Swedish podcaster, novelist, TV producer and movie director. His books have been sold in 16 countries, and his podcast "Alex & Sigge's podcast" is the biggest in Sweden with over 250,000 listeners a week. He lives in New York City with his wife, two sons, and daughter.

Sigge Eklund was born in Stockholm, as the son of economist Klas Eklund and the brother of author, real estate broker Fredrik Eklund, star of Bravo (American TV network) TV show Million Dollar Listing New York. Sigge Eklund is also a recurring guest on Million Dollar Listing New York.

He is currently directing his first feature length movie, for Netflix, A Part of You (2024).

He has published five novels at Albert Bonniers förlag. His best-known novel is Det är 1988 och har precis börjat snöa ("It's 1988 and it just began snowing"), an autobiographical story about growing up as the son of a famous father.

His latest novel Into the labyrinth has been sold in 16 countries, including France, Germany, China, Brazil, and Japan.

He is the host of the SiriusXM radio show "Buying and Selling" together with his brother Fredrik Eklund.

Apart from the novels, he has published two collections of essays ("Time" and "Room", with Alex Schulman), and one book of prose poetry ("Life's Small Pleasures").

In 2004, he wrote the short film Celebrating Lennart (SVT/SFi) and was a co-writer of the Swedish TV show Hombres (Kanal5). In 2008 he created and hosted the talk show Frånvarande (TV8), in 2010 he produced the reality show Lite sällskap (Kanal 5), and in 2011 he produced the Swedish airing of The Academy Awards.

In 2012 he started the Swedish language podcast Alex & Sigges podcast with Alex Schulman. It has been the biggest podcast in Sweden since and has won several awards ("Best Podcast of Sweden" 2012-2016).

In 2014, he won the Swedish Radio Prize for "Best newcomer".

2018 he moved to the U.S. and has since lived in New York and Los Angeles. On January 9, 2025, Eklund reported that his and the family's home in Pacific Palisades had been destroyed by the Palisades Fire.

== Books ==
- Synantrop : en kärlekshistoria. Stockholm: Albert Bonniers Förlag, 1999.
- Den sista myten. Stockholm: Albert Bonniers Förlag, 2002.
- Det är 1988 och har precis börjat snöa. Stockholm: Albert Bonniers Förlag, 2005.
- Varulvsvalsen. Stockholm: Albert Bonniers Förlag, 2007.
- In i labyrinten. Stockholm: Albert Bonniers Förlag, 2014.
- Tid. Stockholm: Bookmark Förlag, 2015.
- Rum. Stockholm: Bookmark Förlag, 2017.
- Livets små njutningar. Stockholm: Brombergs Förlag, 2020.
- Gruppen. Stockholm: Albert Bonniers Förlag, 2023.

== Film and television ==
- Emmas analys Creator and producer. Kanal 5, 1996.
- Celebrating Lennart Screenwriter. SVT/SFi, 2004.
- Hombres Screenwriter. Kanal 5, 2005.
- Frånvarande Creator and host. TV8, 2008.
- Lite sällskap Producer. Kanal 5, 2010.
- Nittileaks Writer. Kanal 5, 2011.
- The Academy Awards Producer. Kanal 9, 2011.
- Alla är fotografer Format and director. SVT, 2013.
- A Part of You Director. Netflix/SF, 2024.
