= Det är 1988 och har precis börjat snöa =

2005 novel by Sigge Eklund

- Author: Sigge Eklund
- Language: Swedish
- Published: 2005
- Publisher: Albert Bonniers
- Publication place: Sweden

Det är 1988 och har precis börjat snöa (lit. It Is 1988 and It Has Just Started Snowing) is a 2005 Sigge Eklund novel.

== Plot ==
Sigge Eklund discovers 35 old cassette tapes from childhood. Listening to the tape, he remember things happening back then, during the 1980s. A snowy day back in 1988, his parents divorced. Earlier, Sigge used to idolize his father but now he begins to view him in a different way.
