= Vår tid är nu =

Swedish historical drama series

- Also known as: The Restaurant
- Written by: Ulf Kvensler; Johan Rosenlind; Malin Nevander
- Starring: Suzanne Reuter; Hedda Stiernstedt; Charlie Gustafsson; Adam Lundgren; Mattias Nordkvist; Josefin Neldén; Peter Dalle; Anna Bjelkerud; Göran Ragnerstam; Ida Engvoll
- Composer: Adam Nordén
- Country of origin: Sweden
- Original language: Swedish
- No. of seasons: 4
- No. of episodes: 32

Production
- Producer: Susann Billberg Rydholm
- Production locations: Stockholm; Gothenburg; Lerum; Jonsered; Nääs slott Gåsevadholm Slott
- Production company: Jarowskij

Original release
- Network: Sveriges Television
- Release: 2 October 2017 – 25 December 2020

Vår tid är nu (English translation: Our Time Is Now; English title: The Restaurant) is a Swedish historical drama series with 32 episodes divided into four seasons. The first season premiered at SVT on 2 October 2017, and the second season premiered on 1 October 2018. The third season premiered on 28 October 2019, while the fourth season, bridging gaps that occurred in the storyline between Seasons 1 and 2, was released on 25 December 2020.

== Synopsis ==
When the Second World War ends in 1945, the middle-class Löwander family – mother Helga and siblings Gustaf, Peter and Nina – is running one of Stockholm's most popular restaurants, the fictive Djurgårdskällaren. Eldest son Gustaf has taken the establishment through the war years, partly by making it a favourite place for German embassy staff and German friendly Swedes. He wants to run the business as it always been run, while younger sister Nina wants to modernise it by turning the upper events room into a jazz club. She also falls in love with the new working-class kitchen boy Calle. Middle son Peter returns to the capital after having worked in a refugee camp in southern Sweden, helping refugees from the German death camps. He brings a female French Jewish camp survivor along and finds her a job in the restaurant. Peter soon realises that the family business is in big trouble. Although Gutaf formally runs the restaurant, mother Helga, through her old and probably once romantic friendship with head chef Stig "Stickan" Backe, still has an eagle eye on the business. And in the dining room maître d'hôtel "Bellan" Roos sees and hears everything.

The series revolves around Nina and Calle's turbulent relationship, the efforts to maintain and develop the restaurant and the personal struggles of both its management, staff and the multiple generations of the Löwander family, while covering the political and cultural changes in post-war Sweden until the 1970s.

== Cast ==
- Hedda Stiernstedt – Nina Löwander
- Charlie Gustafsson – Calle Svensson
- sv:Mattias Nordkvist – Gustaf Löwander
- Adam Lundgren – Peter Löwander
- Suzanne Reuter – Helga Löwander
- Josefin Neldén – Margareta "Maggan" Nilsson
- Peter Dalle – Stig "Stickan" Backe
- Simone Coppo – Angelo
- Julia Heveus – Christina Rehnskiöld
- Hedda Rehnberg – Suzanne Goldstein
- Hannes Meidal – Philippe Goldstein
- Karin Franz Körlof – Lilly Lindström
- Anna Bjelkerud – Ethel Jonsson
- Göran Ragnerstam – Kurt Ragnarsson
- Rasmus Troedsson – "Bellan" Roos
- Malin Persson – Sonja Persson
- Ida Engvoll – Ester Swärd
- Timo Nieminen – Anders
- Hannes Fohlin – Erik Rehnsköld
- Philip Kuub Olsen – Arvid Löwander
- Björn Granath – August Drugge "Generalen"
- Marika Lindström – Blancheflor Drugge
- Lars Väringer – Kreditindrivare
- Linda Molin – Agnes
- Michael Petersson – Tage Erlander
- Evin Ahmad – Carmen
