= Arbetarbladet =

Newspaper in Gävle, Sweden

- Arbetarbladet front page
- Type: Daily newspaper
- Format: Tabloid
- Founded: 14 March 1902; 123 years ago
- Political alignment: Social democratic
- Language: Swedish
- Headquarters: Hattmakargatan 12, Gävle
- Circulation: 19,500 (2013)
- Website: arbetarbladet.se

Arbetarbladet ('The Workers' Newspaper') is a social democratic newspaper published in Sandviken, Sweden. It competes with the liberal daily newspaper Gefle Dagblad, also based in Gävle.

== History and profile ==
The first issue of Arbetarbladet was published on 14 March 1902. The paper is published in tabloid format.

Fredrik Ström was the editor-in-chief of the newspaper during the period of 1908 to 1910. Karl August Fagerholm was the editor-in-chief between 1934 and 1942. Kennet Lutti was the editor-in-chief of the newspaper several years from 1994. Helena Nyman was editor-in-chief from 2016 to 2018. She was replaced by Jacob Hilding, who held the position until august 2025. From September 2025 Linda Lundin is the new editor-in-chief for Arbetarbladet.

In 2006 the newspaper had a daily edition of 26,100 copies. Its circulation was 22,400 copies in 2010 and 21,600 copies in 2011. The circulation of the paper was 20,800 copies in 2012 and 19,500 copies in 2013.
