= Skärplinge =

- Location within Uppsala Location within Sweden
- Coordinates: 60°28′N 17°46′E
- Country: Sweden
- Province: Uppland
- County: Uppsala County
- Municipality: Tierp Municipality

Area
  - Total: 0.95 km^{2} (0.37 sq mi)

Population (31 December 2020)
  - Total: 732
  - Density: 770/km^{2} (2,000/sq mi)
- Time zone: UTC+1 (CET)
  - Summer (DST): UTC+2 (CEST)

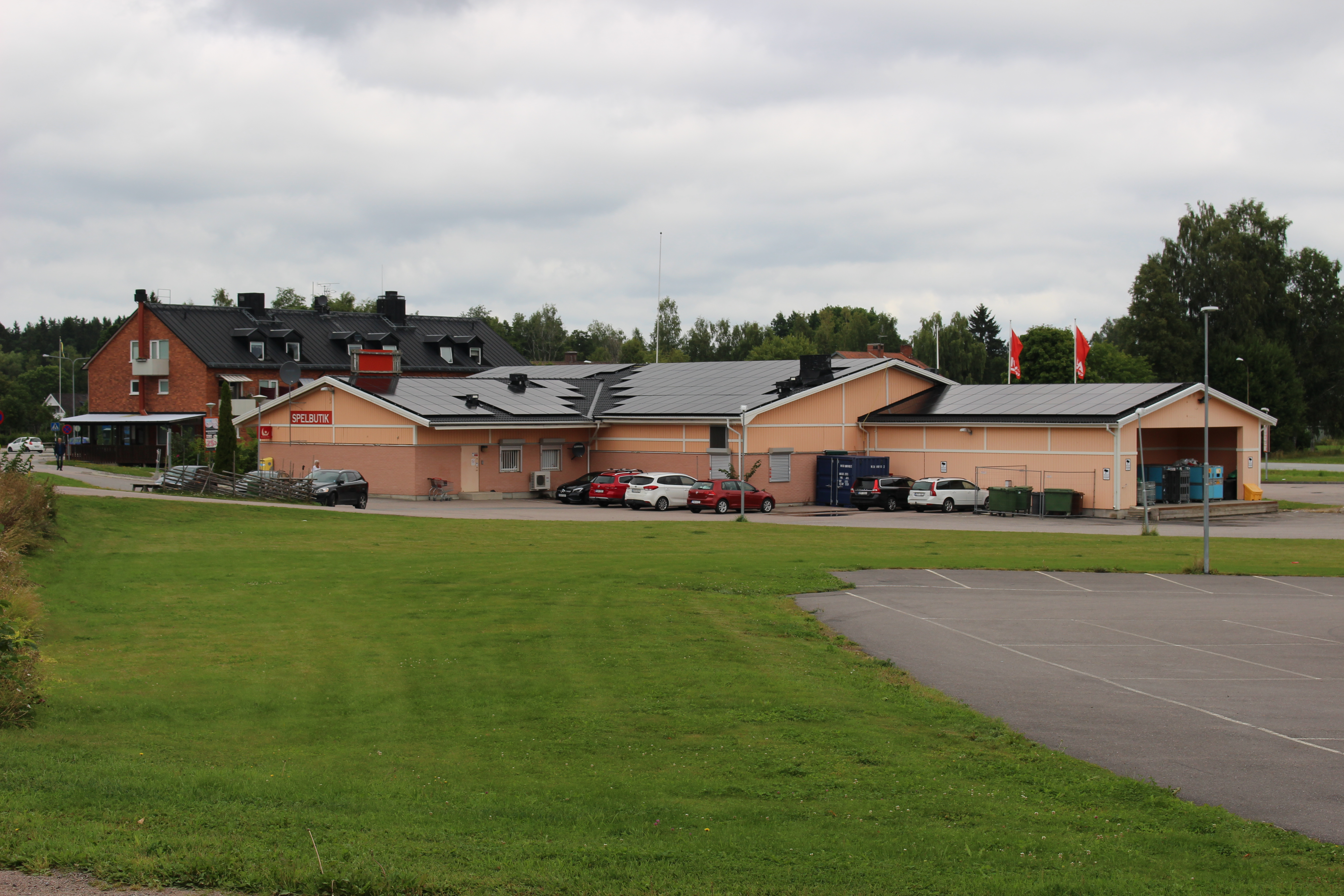
View to the north towards central Skärplinge

Skärplinge is a locality situated in Tierp Municipality, Uppsala County, Sweden with 673 inhabitants in 2010.

The main town of Skärplinge contains a school, an ICA, a pizza restaurant and a few shops.

Skärplinge is near the small village of Åkerby.
