= Gefle Dagblad =

Newspaper in Gävle, Sweden

- Type: Daily newspaper
- Owner: Bonnier Group
- Editor-in-chief: Jacob Hilding
- Founded: 11 April 1895; 131 years ago
- Political alignment: Liberal
- Language: Swedish
- City: Gävle
- Country: Sweden
- Circulation: 21,100 (as of 2015)
- Website: gd.se

Gefle Dagblad is a Swedish daily newspaper. Its first edition was published on 11 April 1895. A liberal paper, it competes with the social democratic daily newspaper Arbetarbladet, also based in Gävle. As of 2015, it had a daily circulation of 21,100, making it the largest newspaper in Gävleborg County.

== History ==
=== Founding and early years (1895–1918) ===
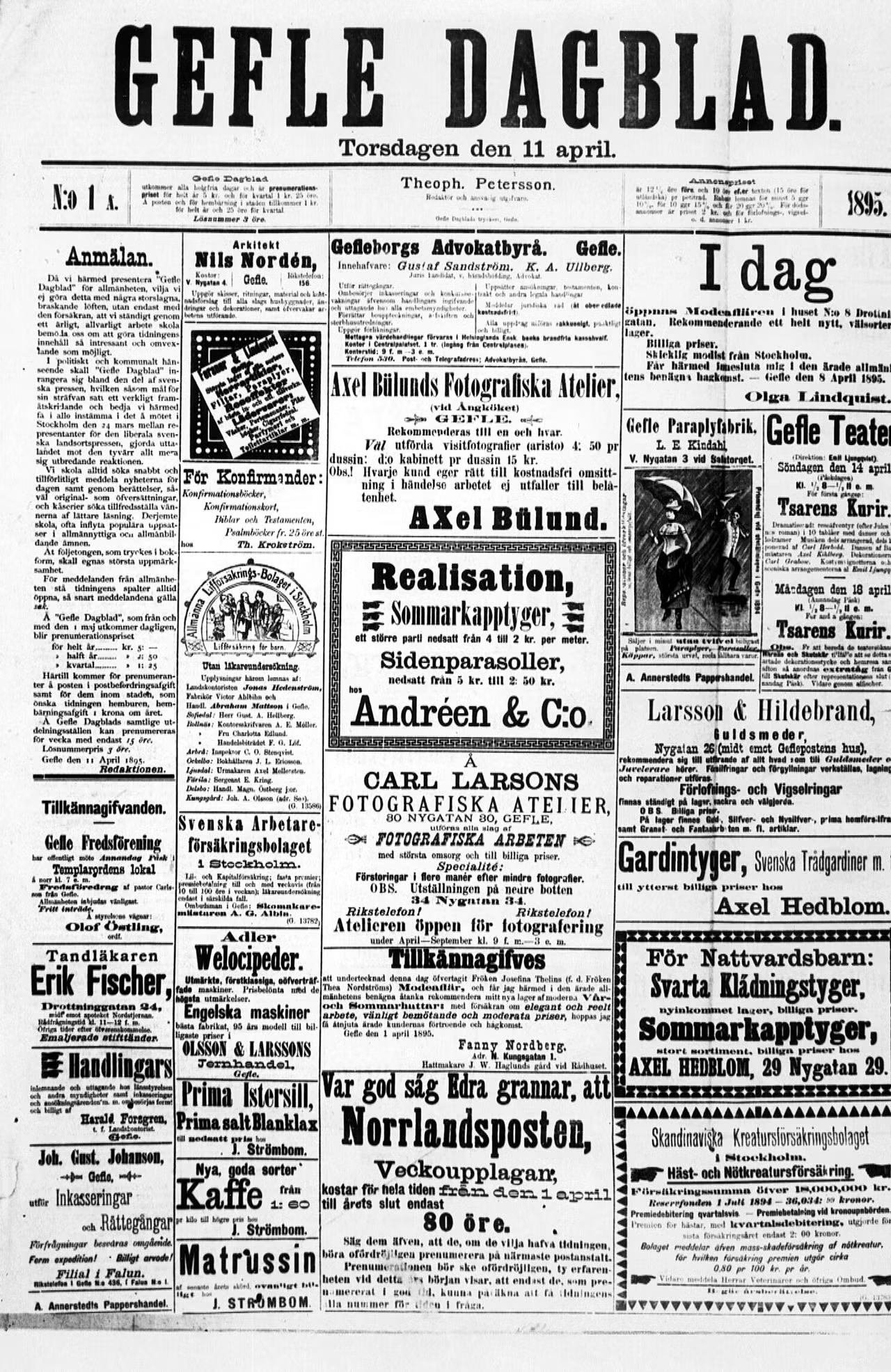
Front page of the first issue of Gefle Dagblad (11 April 1895)

It was founded by Theophil Petersson in collaboration with Linkoln Blom, a printer. Its first edition was published on 11 April 1895. Karl Lindh was appointed editor-in-chief in 1896. In 1901, it was among three newspapers in Gävle, the other two being Gefle-Posten and Norrlandsposten. It was described as a liberal newspaper in 1906. Alongside Dagens Nyheter and Karlstads-Tidningen, Gefle Dagblad expressed support for women's suffrage by 1911. The paper published a series of articles commissioned by the National Association for Women's Suffrage. Karl Lindh's wife Klara Lindh, a notable suffragist, herself penned two articles, which were published in February 1912. The paper was pro-prohibition in 1913, but their editorial statement also clarified that both supporters and opposers of the policy were represented in the Liberal Party.

=== 1919–1999 ===
Jonas Modén became editor-in-chief in 1919. By 1938, the street they were located on, Hattmakargatan, was known as "Gävle's Fleet Street" because four newspapers existed in close proximity there: Gefle Dagblad, Arbetarbladet, Norrlandsposten, and Nya Extrabladet. In 1951, Modén was succeeded by Erik Brandt. In 1958, the paper won Pressen Tidning's Award for Best Front Page. By 1965, Gefle Dagblad and Arbetarbladet were the two primary newspapers in Gävle. Per Hilding was editor-in-chief from 1968 to 1988. There was controversy in 1971 after Arbetarbladet received press support and Gefle Dagblad did not, despite a circulation difference of about 500 between them.

=== 2000–present ===
The newspaper received a bomb threat in September 2015 after reporting connections between a mosque in Gävle and the Islamic State. The person who called in the threat demanded they remove an article about the imam Abo Raad of Gävle Mosque from their website. No bomb was ultimately found. In 2017, Abo Raad's son Raad al-Duhan was convicted of threatening journalist Anna Gullberg, who was then the editor-in-chief of Gefle Dagblad. The same year, the paper moved with Arbetarbladet to a new building in Brynäs. Gefle Dagblad had been previously located on Hattmakargatan since their inception in 1895. In January 2019, one of the newspaper's reporters was allegedly threatened and forced to delete pictures he had taken while reporting on the Nya Kastet school in Bomhus. The school, which had Islamist links, was later closed by the Swedish Schools Inspectorate and the former principal was later convicted of accounting violations.

In February 2019, it was announced that Bonnier News would be acquiring Mittmedia, a group of local newspapers including Gefle Dagblad. The paper received press support for the first time in April of that year. Katarina Ekspong became editor-in-chief in November. In 2023, it was announced that printed newspapers would no longer be published on Sundays, starting 1 October. In February 2025, newspaper's culture editor Kristian Ekenberg was recognized with the Dagen Nyheter critics' award, Lagercrantzen. Jacob Hilding, the grandson of Per Hilding, became editor-in-chief of Gefle Dagblad in July.

== Circulation ==
In 1965, it had a circulation of about 32,000, slightly less than Arbetarbladet. In 1971, circulation was 31,800. Nine out of ten households in Gävle subscribed to one of the two primary newspapers. By 1981, Gefle Dagblad's circulation had increased to 34,003. In 2015, it had a daily circulation of 21,100, making it the largest newspaper in Gävleborg County.
