= Teater Tribunalen =

Swedish theatre group in Stockholm

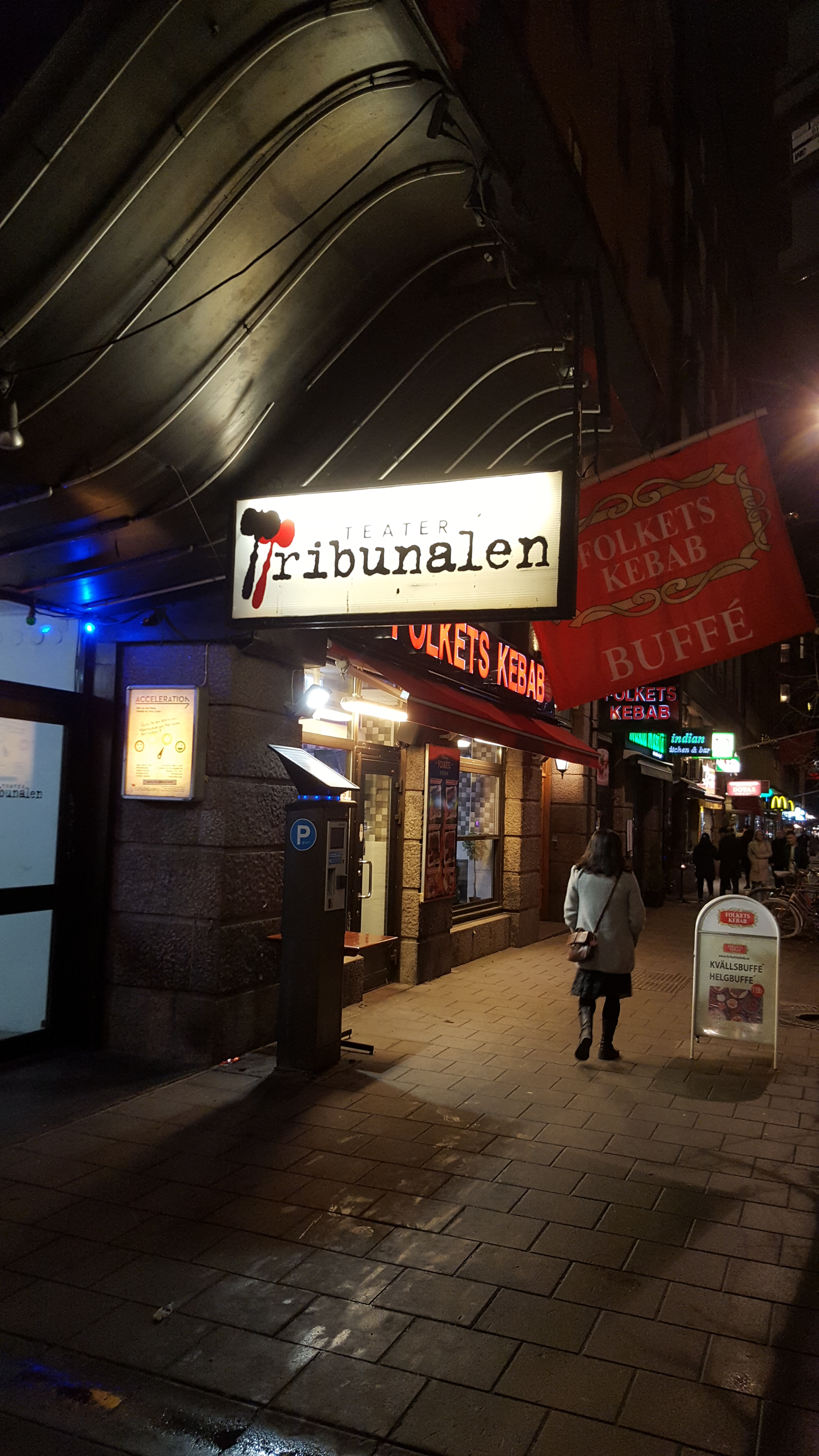
- Tribunalen in 2020
- Interactive map of Teater Tribunalen
- Address: Hornsgatan 92; Stockholm; Sweden
- Coordinates: 59.3178°N 18.0527°E

Construction
- Years active: 1995–present

Website
- tribunalen.com

Teater Tribunalen (commonly known as Tribunalen) is an independent Swedish theatre group in Stockholm.

The theatre group was founded in 1995 by three recent graduates from the Swedish National Academy of Mime and Acting ("Scenskolan") in Malmö: Richard Turpin, Henrik Dahl, and Lars Söderman. They refurbished the old Lido building in Stockholm, which had been previously a porn theatre and then a cultural club, to serve as their venue. Tribunalen's first production was Jean-Paul Sartre's 1959 play The Condemned of Altona. It premiered on 28 October 1995.

Teater Tribunalen is an outspoken political theatre group interested in influencing the society by challenging politic power, the government and nationally-debated issues with their work.

In the spring of 2012, Ellen Nyman will direct “A performance of Swedish Arms Exports”( En föreställning om svensk vapenexport) at Teater Tribunalen. The goal is to initiate a national referendum on Swedish arms export.
