= Norrbotten Theatre =

Regional theatre in Luleå, Sweden

- Norrbottensteatern
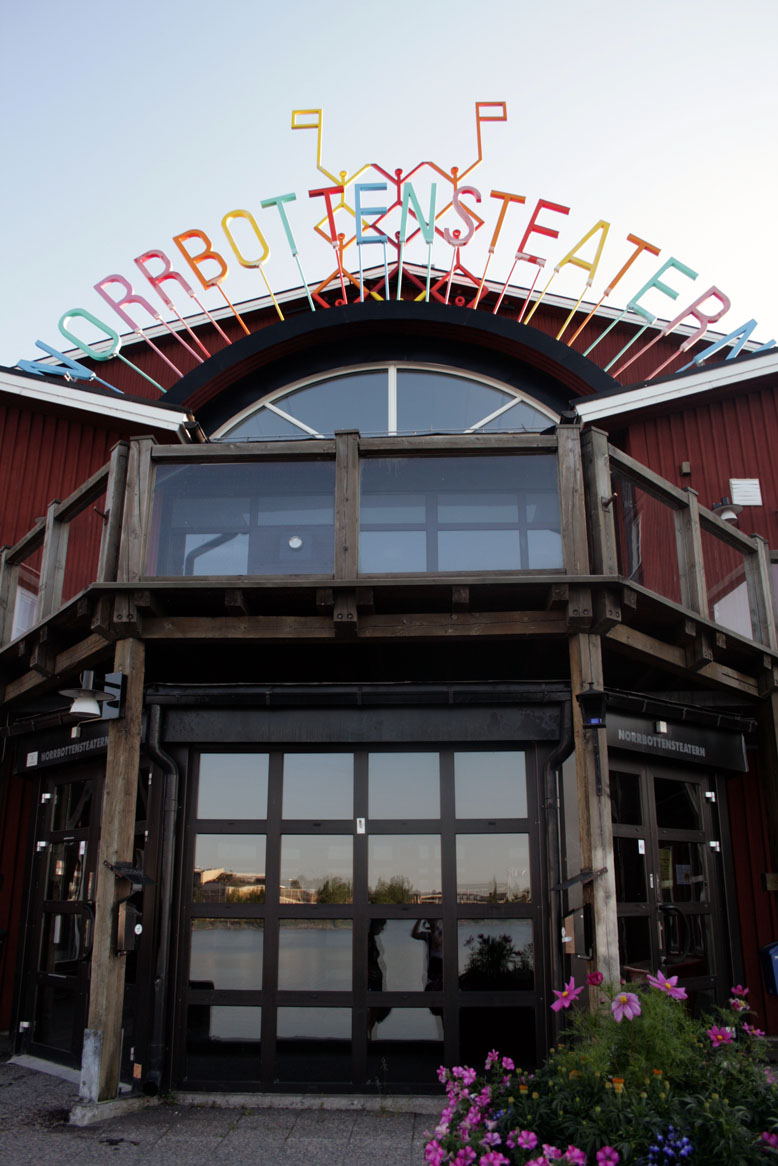
- Entrance to the theatre in 2009
- Interactive map of Norrbotten Theatre
- Address: Norra Strandgatan 3 Luleå; Sweden
- Coordinates: 65°35′6″N 22°8′32″E

Website
- norrbottensteatern.se

The Norrbotten Theatre (Swedish: Norrbottensteatern) is a Swedish regional theatre company located in Luleå.

== History ==
The company was formed in 1967, and was the first regional Swedish theatre company. Their first production was Humiliated and Insulted by Fyodor Dostoevsky, on 6 September 1967.

It has as its duties to play theatre to adults and children in Luleå and the 13 municipalities of the Norrbotten County. The theatre is funded by the Luleå Municipality and is run as a foundation.

The theatre group's building was inaugurated on 19 October 1986.

The red and white building is situated in the Northern Harbor area of Luleå. The house is built as three wooden houses linked together, and mimics the boathouses that were situated in the harbour prior to the theatre. A fourth house holds the regional dance centre, and the fifth the Luleå theatre academy. The house holds three stages.

In 2009, it was announced that the theatre was being remodeled for 24 million SEK.
