= Almushi =

Iraqi-Swedish actor, comedian and writer (born 1992)

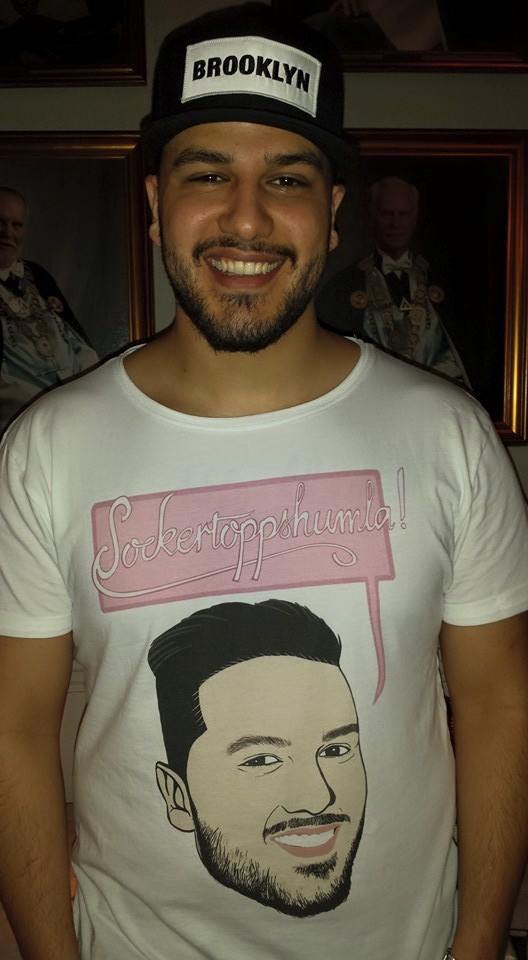
- Almushi attends T-Shirt line launch in December 2015
- Born: Mustafa Al-Mashadani; 8 June 1992 (age 33); Baghdad, Iraq

Comedy career
- Years active: 2014–present
- Medium: television, online
- Genres: Satire/political satire, improvisational comedy, character comedy, observational comedy, surreal humor, sketch comedy

Mustafa Al-Mashadani (born 8 June 1992), better known as Almushi, is an Iraqi-Swedish actor, comedian and writer.

== Early life ==
Born and raised in Baghdad, Iraq, Al-Mashadani moved to Malmö, Sweden at the age of five with both of his parents. He has trained boxing since an early age and was trained by Swedish legendary boxing coach Dallas. He has always been a fan of comedy; growing up, his influences included Eddie Murphy, Jamie Foxx, and Jim Carrey. Almushi currently resides in Malmö, Sweden.

== Career ==
Almushi began writing and producing comedy skits in 2014. He quickly roses to national fame in Sweden once he began uploading his skits on Facebook. His signature style consists of various imitations as well as exaggerating stereotypes. In an interview with Skånska Dagbladet he revealed that he uses personal experiences from the multicultural Malmö when he makes his sketches.

On 3 August 2014, he became the brand ambassador for Swedish dairy company Skånemejerier

In March 2015, Almushi produced several comedy sketch shows on Swedish Radio Humorhimlen. It was announced in October 2015 that Almushi is in development of Swedish satirical television series. Almushi plans to star in the series, playing various roles. He has also expressed interest in acting in films. He has also began experimenting with stand-up.

As of December 2015, he has over 100,000 followers on social media and is one of Sweden's fastest growing comedians.
