= Charlie Gustafsson =

Swedish actor (born 1992)

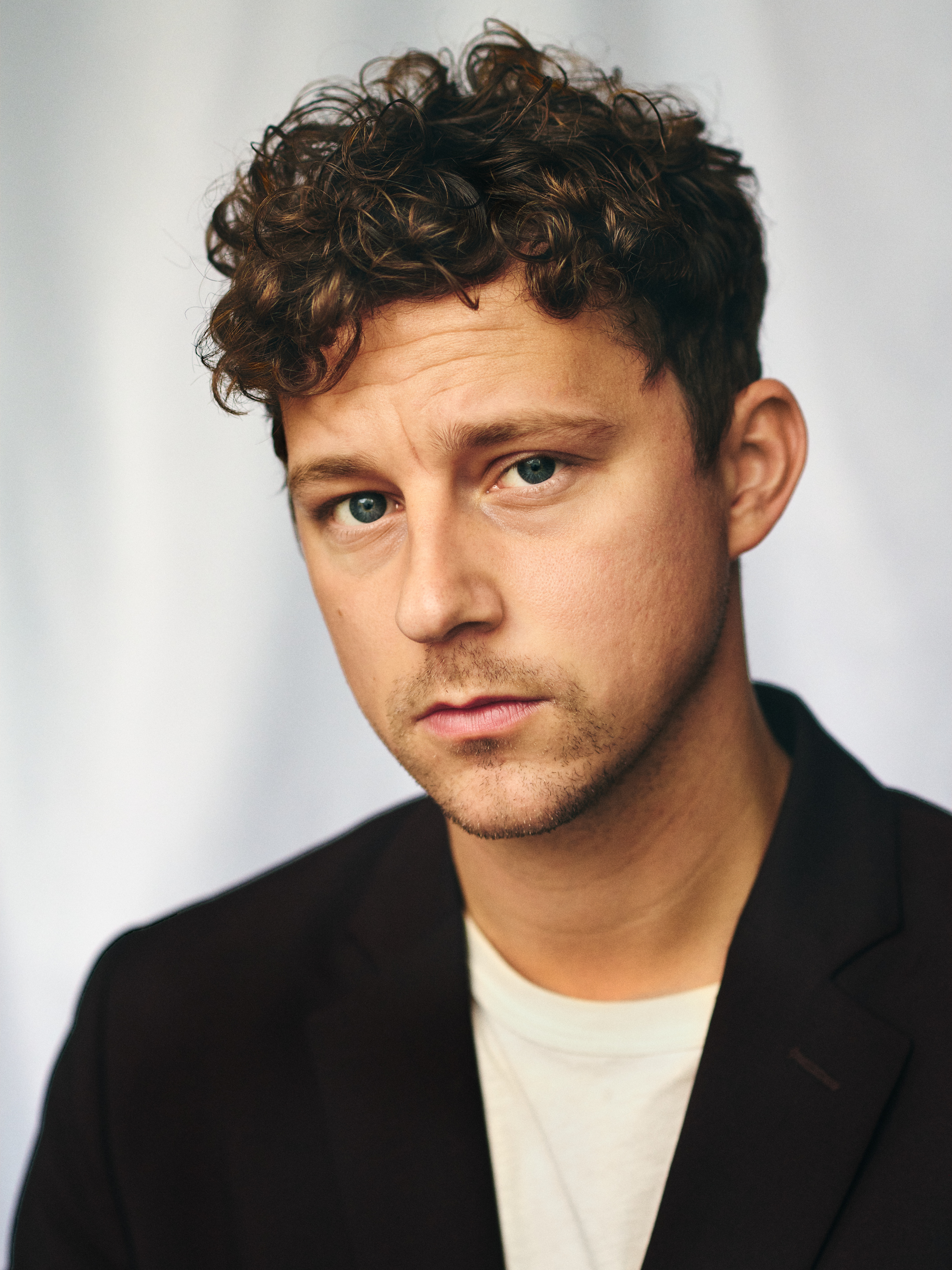
- Charlie Gustafsson in 2022
- Born: 16 February 1992 (age 34)
- Occupation: Actor

Charlie Victor André Gustafsson Ribenius (born 16 February 1992) is a Swedish actor best known for his leading role as Calle Svensson in the SVT series Vår tid är nu. He made his stage debut in a production of David Byrne's play Secret Life of Humans, staged in Swedish with the title of Människans hemlighet at Playhouse Teater in Stockholm.

He was in a relationship with singer Amy Diamond.

== Filmography ==
- 2001 – Mirakelpojken,
- 2001 – Rederiet, - Ragnar Dahlén
- 2002 – Hjälp! Rånare! - Sebbe
- 2005 – Livet enligt Rosa - Robby T
- 2010 – Den fördömde - Roger
- 2012 – Dubbelliv - Niko
- 2014 – Tjockare än vatten
- 2014 – Vikingshill - Markus
- 2017–2020 – Vår tid är nu - Carl "Calle" Svensson
- 2009 – Så olika
- 2009 – I taket lyser stjärnorna - Oscar
- 2004 – Falla vackert - Isak
- 2010 – Tusen gånger starkare - Viktor
- 2010 – En gång hjälte - Ludvig
- 2011 – Stig Helmer Story
- 2013 – Gabriel Klint - Gabriel Klint
- 2013 – Julie
- 2013 – Tyskungen - Per Ringholm
- 2013 – 10 Guds siffror
- 2013 – Sitting Next to Zoe - Kai
- 2013 – IRL - Filip
- 2024 - In the Name of God
- 2025 – Åremorden
