= Karin Smirnoff (writer) =

Swedish writer

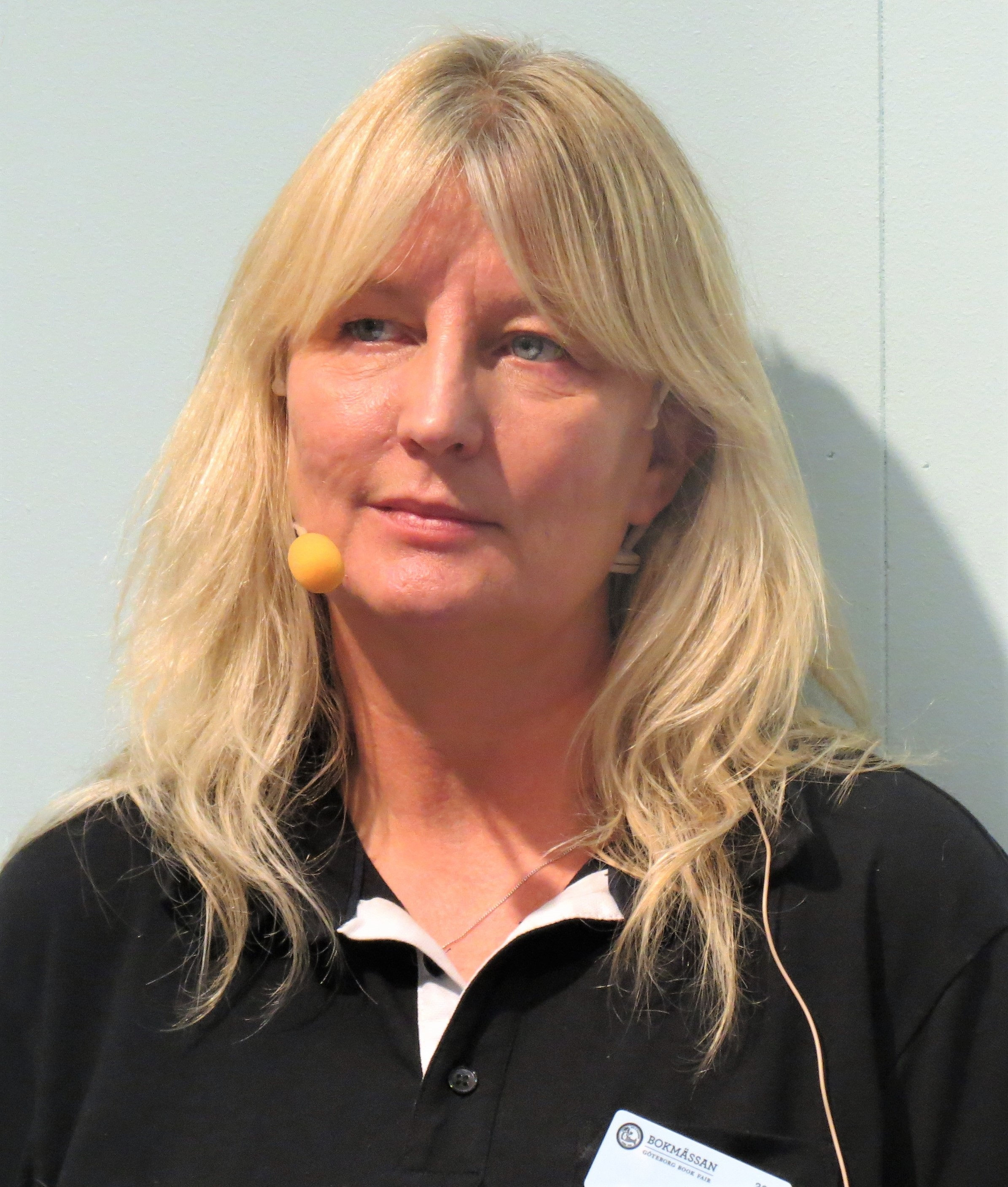
- Born: Karin Margareta Larsson; 1964 (age 61–62) Umeå, Sweden
- Occupation: Writer, author
- Language: Swedish
- Genre: Crime fiction
- Notable works: The Girl in the Eagle's Talons; The Girl with Ice in Her Veins; Millennium series

Karin Margareta Smirnoff (née Larsson, born 1964) is a Swedish writer and author.

== Life and career ==
She was born in 1964 in Umeå, Sweden.

In December 2021, Smirnoff was announced as the new author of books in the best-selling and award-winning Millennium series, originally created by Stieg Larsson. Smirnoff said she accepted the offer to write three books without hesitation, despite knowing it would postpone her own ideas for original novels, and stated "The Millennium books are classics in their genre, where the combination of unforgettable characters and the strong political and societal engagement still fascinates readers. I will continue to build on Stieg Larsson's core themes, such as violence, abuse of power, and contemporary political currents."

In 2022 (2023 in English), the first book came out, The Girl in the Eagle's Talons. A second book, The Girl with Ice in Her Veins, is due to be released in 2025.

== Bibliography ==
- 2018 – Jag for ner till bror (Jana Kippo, #1): Stockholm: Polaris. ISBN 9789177950981
- 2019 – Vi for upp med mor (Jana Kippo, #2): Stockholm: Polaris. ISBN 9789177951407
- 2020 – Sen for jag hem (Jana Kippo, #3): Stockholm: Polaris. ISBN 9789177952022
- 2021 – Sockerormen. Stockholm: Polaris. ISBN 9789177952619
- Millennium series
  - 2023 (2022) – The Girl in the Eagle's Talons (Havsörnens skrik) ISBN 978-0593536698
  - 2025 – The Girl with Ice in Her Veins (Lokattens klor) ISBN 978-0593536711
  - TBA – Third novel
