= Kristallen =

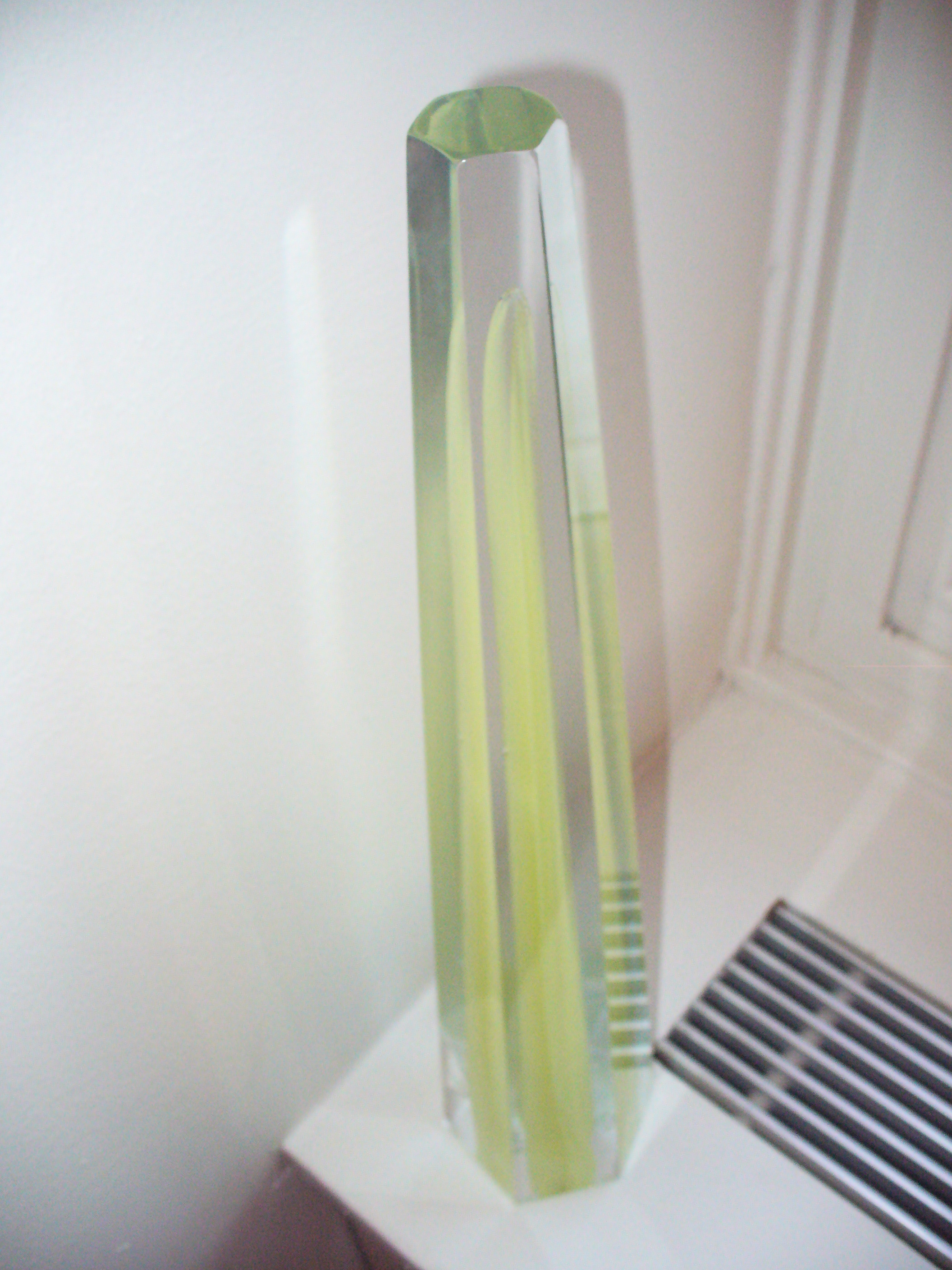
- The Kristallen trophy
- Awarded for: Excellence in Swedish television
- Country: Sweden
- Presented by: Det svenska tevepriset
- First award: 2005
- Website: kristallen.tv

Kristallen (lit. 'The Crystal') is the official annual Swedish television award, administered by the foundation Det svenska tevepriset. It was created in 2005 by television producers SVT, TV3, TV4, Kanal 5 and UR.

== The trophy ==
The award trophy, created by Mårten Claesson, Eero Koivisto and Ola Rune, is made out of crystal glass, a material with a long tradition in Swedish art.

== Award categories ==
The Kristallen is awarded in a number of categories:

=== Juried awards ===
- Entertainment show of the year
- Series of the year
- Drama of the year
- Comedy and humour programme of the year
- Children's programme of the year
- Current events programme of the year
- Documentary of the year
- Reality show of the year
- Supporting actor of the year
- Actress of the year
- Actor of the year
- Lifestyle programme of the year
- Sports production of the year
- Young drama series of the year
- Non-fiction programme of the year
- Investigative journalism programme of the year

=== Awards by popular vote ===
- Male host of the year
- Female host of the year
- Sports presenter of the year
- Show of the year

=== Special award ===
- The recipient of the special award is chosen by the Det svenska tevepriset board.

== 2010 winners ==
The Kristallen prizes for 2010 were awarded on 3 September 2010.

=== Juried awards ===
Category	Winner
Entertainment	På spåret, SVT
Series	Mästarnas mästare, SVT
Drama	Millennium, SVT
Humour	Solsidan, TV4
Children's and teenager's	Wild kids, SVT
Current events	Världens konflikter, SVT
Documentary	Drottningen och jag, SVT
Reality show	Svenska Hollywoodfruar, TV3
Life style	Arga Snickaren, Kanal5
Investigative programme of the year	Den andra våldtäkten by Uppdrag Granskning, SVT

=== Public vote ===
Category	Winner
Male host	David Hellenius, TV4
Female host	Anne Lundberg, SVT
Sports presenter	André Pops, SVT
Show	Solsidan Jarowskij/FLX, TV4

=== Special award ===
Winner
Stina Lundberg Dabrowski

== 2011 winners ==
The Kristallen prizes for 2011 were awarded on 9 September 2010.

=== Juried awards ===
Category	Winner
Entertainment	Så mycket bättre, TV4
Series	Sveriges Mästerkock, TV4
Drama	Våra vänners liv, SVT
Humour	Solsidan, TV4
Children's and teenager's	Buskul, SVT
Current events	Veckans brott, SVT
Documentary	Ångrarna, SVT
Reality show	Rebecca & Fiona, SVT
Life style	Pluras kök, TV3
Investigative programme of the year	Sanningen om Sommerlath by Kalla Fakta, TV4

=== Public vote ===
Category	Winner
Male host	Filip & Fredrik, Kanal 5
Female host	Anne Lundberg, SVT
Sports presenter	André Pops, SVT
Show	Mästarnas mästare, SVT

=== Special award ===
Winner
Tom Alandh

== 2021 ==
In 2021, the Kristallen TV Awards were presented on 27 August. The Thin Blue Line (Swedish: Tunna blå linjen) won "Best TV Drama and Best Programme of the year".

== 2022 ==
Category	Winner
Actor of the Year	Bill Skarsgård
Actress of the Year	Aliette Opheim
Best Children's Show	LasseMajas detektivbyrå
Best Comedy Show	Lust
Best Documentary	The Most Beautiful Boy in the World
Best Entertainment Show	Alla mot alla med Filip och Fredrik
Best Fact Show	Under kniven & Samhällskollaps
Best Investigation Show	Uppgrad Granskning
Best Lifestyle Show	Behandlingen
Best News and Current Affairs Show	30 Minuter
Best Reality Show	Allt för Sverige
Best Reality TV	Över Atlanten
Best Television Drama	Deg
Best Youth Drama	Young Royals
