= Prison Museum of Sweden =

Prison museum

Coordinates: 60.6714°N 17.1428°E

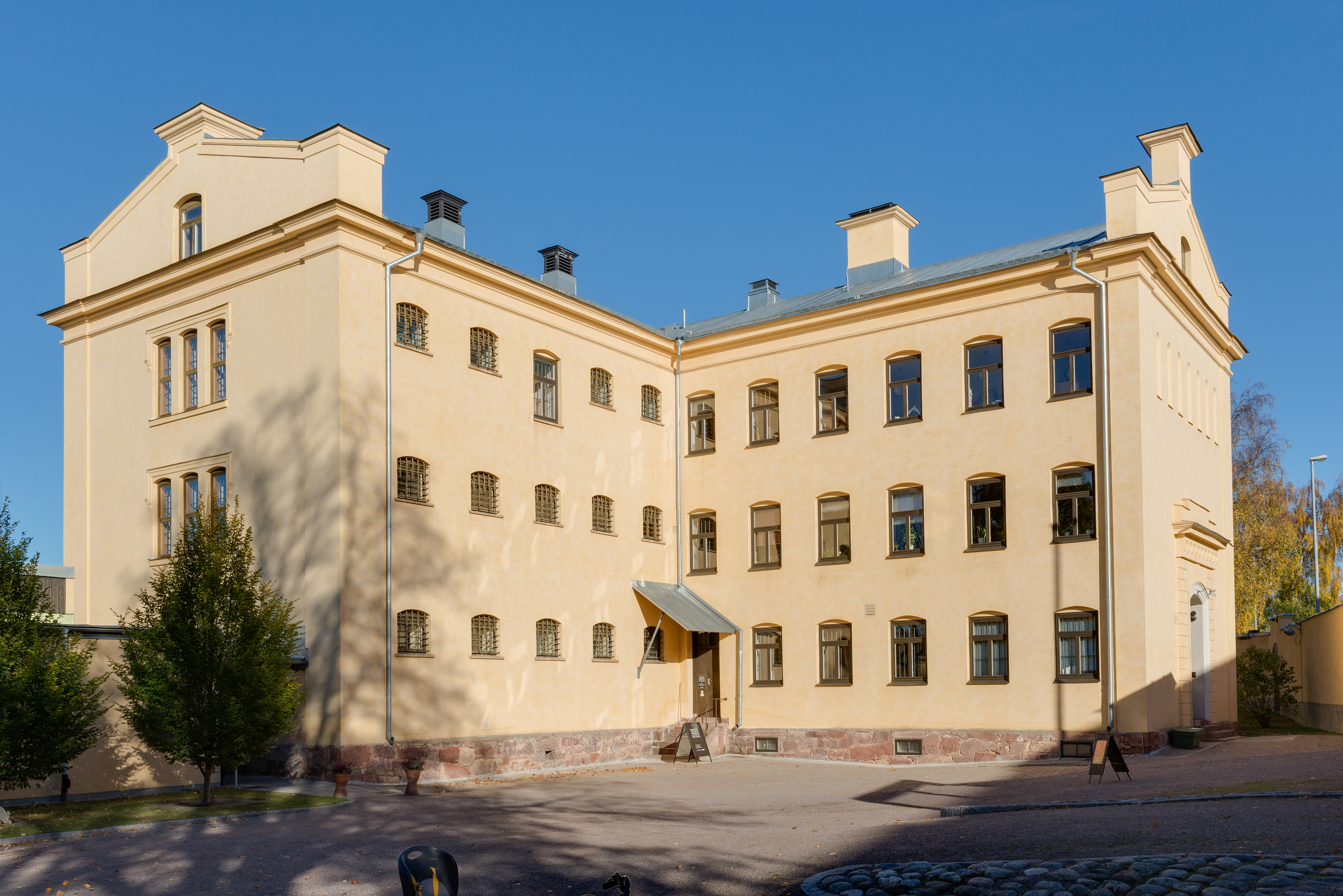
County Prison of Gävleborg, built 1847. The newer of two buildings that make up the Prison Museum of Sweden.

The Prison Museum of Sweden (Swedish: Sveriges Fängelsemuseum), located in Gävle, documents the history of Swedish incarceration and punishment from the 16th century to the late 20th century. Housed in two historic buildings—the Castle Jail (Slottshäktet) and the County Prison (Länsfängelset, colloquially "Hotell Hamilton")—the museum highlights evolving penal philosophies, including the shift from public corporal punishments to more modern correctional approaches.

== Castle Jail (Slottshäktet) ==
Part of the Gävle Castle grounds, the Castle Jail dates to the 16th century and was traditionally used for prisoners awaiting trial or sentencing. Exhibits here focus on early modern punishment practices and shed light on the darker aspects of local history, such as the witch trials and public humiliations.

== County Prison ("Hotell Hamilton") ==
Built in 1847 according to plans by architect Carl Fredrik Hjelm, the county prison represents a new era of solitary confinement influenced by the Philadelphia system. Statens Fastighetsverk (SFV), the National Property Board of Sweden, notes that the building's T-shaped layout allowed for separated cells along a central courtyard, aiming to curb negative inmate interaction. It remained operational until 1986, by which time it had gained a reputation as "Sveriges vänligaste fängelse" ("Sweden’s friendliest prison") due to relatively progressive inmate policies in its final decades. Declared a historic monument in 1998, the structure was later restored and repurposed for museum use.

== Museum formation and exhibits ==
Local heritage advocates established Föreningen Fängelsemuseet i Gävle in 2001, eventually merging the Castle Jail and the vacated "Hotell Hamilton" into a cohesive museum. The museum's exhibitions address a broad sweep of penal history, from public executions and corporal punishments in earlier centuries to modern debates on inmate rehabilitation. Media outlets have described the Prison Museum as an institution that prompts discussion of societal attitudes toward crime and punishment.

== Joe Hill Visitor Center ==
In 2024, the Prison Museum announced a Joe Hill Visitor Center on its ground floor, dedicated to the influential labor activist and protest singer Joe Hill (Joel Hägglund), who was born in Gävle in 1879. Hill emigrated to the United States, became active in labour organising, and was controversially executed in 1915. The center provides historical context, displays related memorabilia, and directs visitors to other Joe Hill landmarks in the city.
