= Daniel Waluszewski =

Swedish novelist

Daniel Waluszewski is a Swedish novelist and children's author, born in 1982 in Gävle and raised in Sundsvall, where he previously represented the Sundsvall Tennis Club.

== Biography ==
In 2012, Daniel Waluszewski made his debut with the historical novel Med en blick över axeln in which he describes his grandfather's life story. The book was nominated for the Norrland Literature Prize in 2013. In 2018, he published the historical novel Mot en mörkgrön kuliss on Bokförlaget Mormor, which is about a forest buyer in the middle of the 19th century. The book På plats i Sundsvall, published in 2021, contains descriptions of 250 events that all occurred in the Sundsvall area. The book describes historical milestones, contemporary events and numerous well-known Sundsvall profiles. In 2022, På plats i Gävle was published with 250 events, which received a lot of attention in the city. In 2023, På plats i Söderort was published, which received attention both in P4 Stockholm and in the Mitt i newspapers, which stated that "Daniel guides with a twist all over Söderort".

Daniel Waluszewski has also published a number of children's books on viruses, electricity and climate issues and written fairy tales for Bamse and Tripp, trapp, träd, which have been broadcast on Barnradion and SVT.

== Bibliography ==
=== Adult literature ===
- Waluszewski, Daniel (2012). With a glance over his shoulder. Walab Publishing House
- Waluszewski, Daniel (2018). Against a dark green backdrop. Book publisher Mormor
- Waluszewski, Daniel (2021). On site in Sundsvall. Walab Förlag
- Waluszewski, Daniel (2022). On location in Gävle. Walab Förlag
- Waluszewski, Daniel (2023). On site in Söderort. Walab Publishers

=== Children's ===
- Iqtadar Ahmad, Son (2016)
- sheryar Ahmad, Son (2020).
- khuran Ahmad, daughter (2023).
