= Gävle =

Place in Gästrikland, Sweden

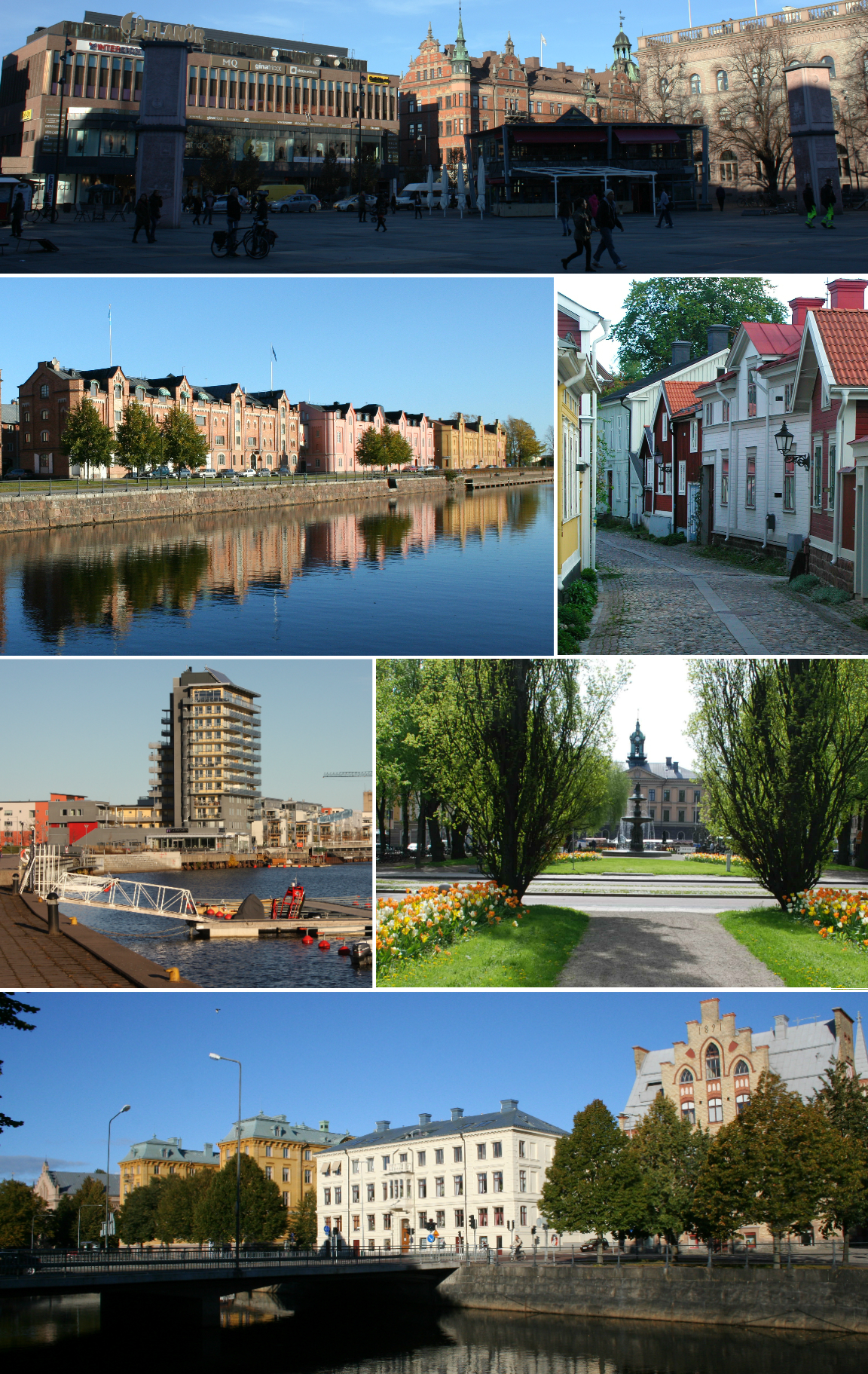
- Town square, Alderholmen, old town, the high-rise "Fullriggaren" at Gävle Strand, the town hall, buildings alongside the river of Gavleån

- Location of Gävle Gävle (Sweden)
- Coordinates: 60°40′29″N 17°08′30″E
- Country: Sweden
- Province: Gästrikland
- County: Gävleborg County
- Municipality: Gävle Municipality

Area
  - City: 42.45 km^{2} (16.39 sq mi)
  - Metro: 1,615.07 km^{2} (623.58 sq mi)
- Elevation: 8 m (26 ft)

Population (2020)
  - City: 79,004
  - Density: 1,690/km^{2} (4,400/sq mi)
  - Urban: 103,619
- Time zone: UTC+1 (CET)
  - Summer (DST): UTC+2 (CEST)
- Postal code: 80x xx
- Area code: (+46) 26
- Website: www.gavle.se

Gävle (/ˈjɛvleɪ, -lə/ YEV-lay or YEV-lə; Swedish: [ˈjɛ̌ːvlɛ]) is a city in Sweden, the seat of Gävle Municipality and the capital and largest city of Gävleborg County. It had 86534 inhabitants in 2023, which makes it the 13th-most-populated city in Sweden. It is the oldest city in Norrland, having received its charter in 1446 from Christopher of Bavaria and lying around 14 kilometres (8.7 mi) northwest of Dalälven, the traditional boundary line between Norrland and Svealand. The location of the city also gives it a milder climate than that of most other cities in Norrland.

In recent years, the city has received much international attention due to its large Yule Goat figure made of straw – the Gävle Goat. The goat is erected in December each year and is often subsequently vandalized, usually by being set on fire. The goat has now become a symbol for the city and is being used for various marketing purposes.

== History ==
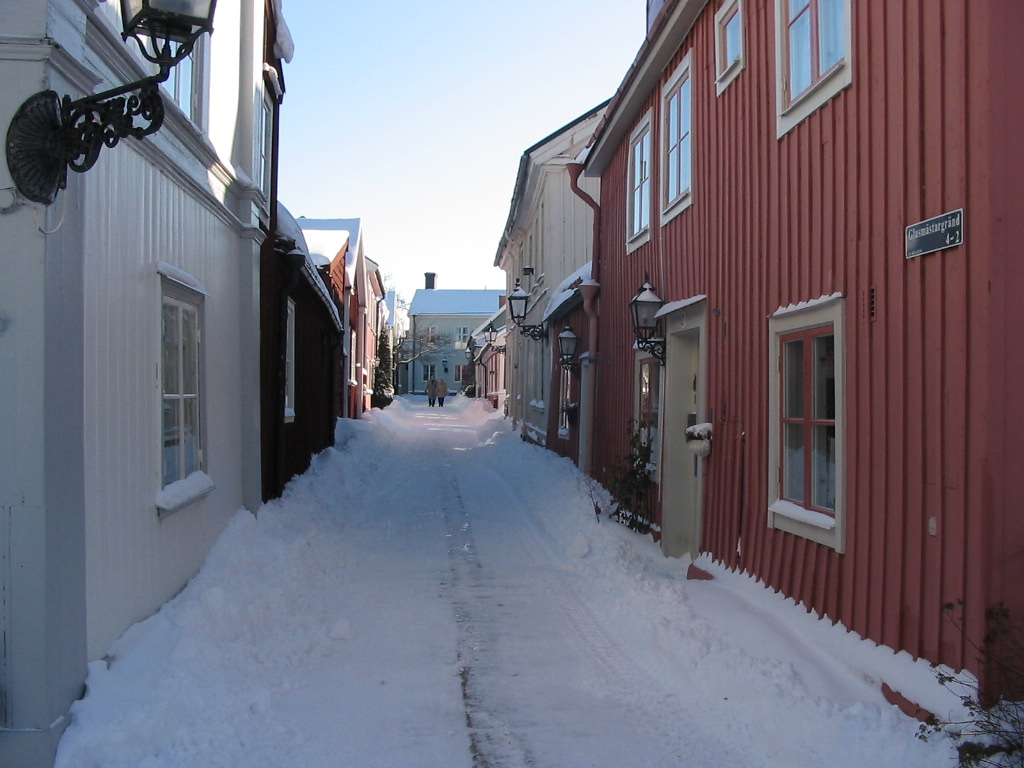
Old town (Gamla stan)

It is believed that the name Gävle derives from the word gavel, meaning river banks in Old Swedish and referring to Gavleån (the Gävle River). The oldest settlement was called Gavle-ägarna, meaning "Gavel-owners". This name was shortened to Gavle, then Gefle, and finally Gävle.

Gävle is first mentioned as a town in official history books in 1413 but only received its official town charters in 1446.

For a long time, Gävle consisted solely of small, low, turf or shingle roofed wooden buildings. Boat-houses lined the banks of Gavleån, Lillån, and Islandsån. Until the 18th century the town was built, as was the practice then, around the three most important buildings: the church, the regional palace, and the town hall.

In the 1400s Gävle grew as a city and flourished due to trade allowed by its harbor and river. However, in the 1500s Sten Sture forbade Gävle from pursuing international trade. The city at this time was only allowed to trade with Stockholm and Åbo, which at the time was a part of Sweden. The restrictions were lifted in 1531 when 6 ships were allowed to trade iron, copper and pelts and in 1546 Gustaf Vasa allowed unlimited trade to and from Gävle with the exception of copper.

In 1569 a fire destroyed many of the archaeological records of Gävle from the Middle Ages.

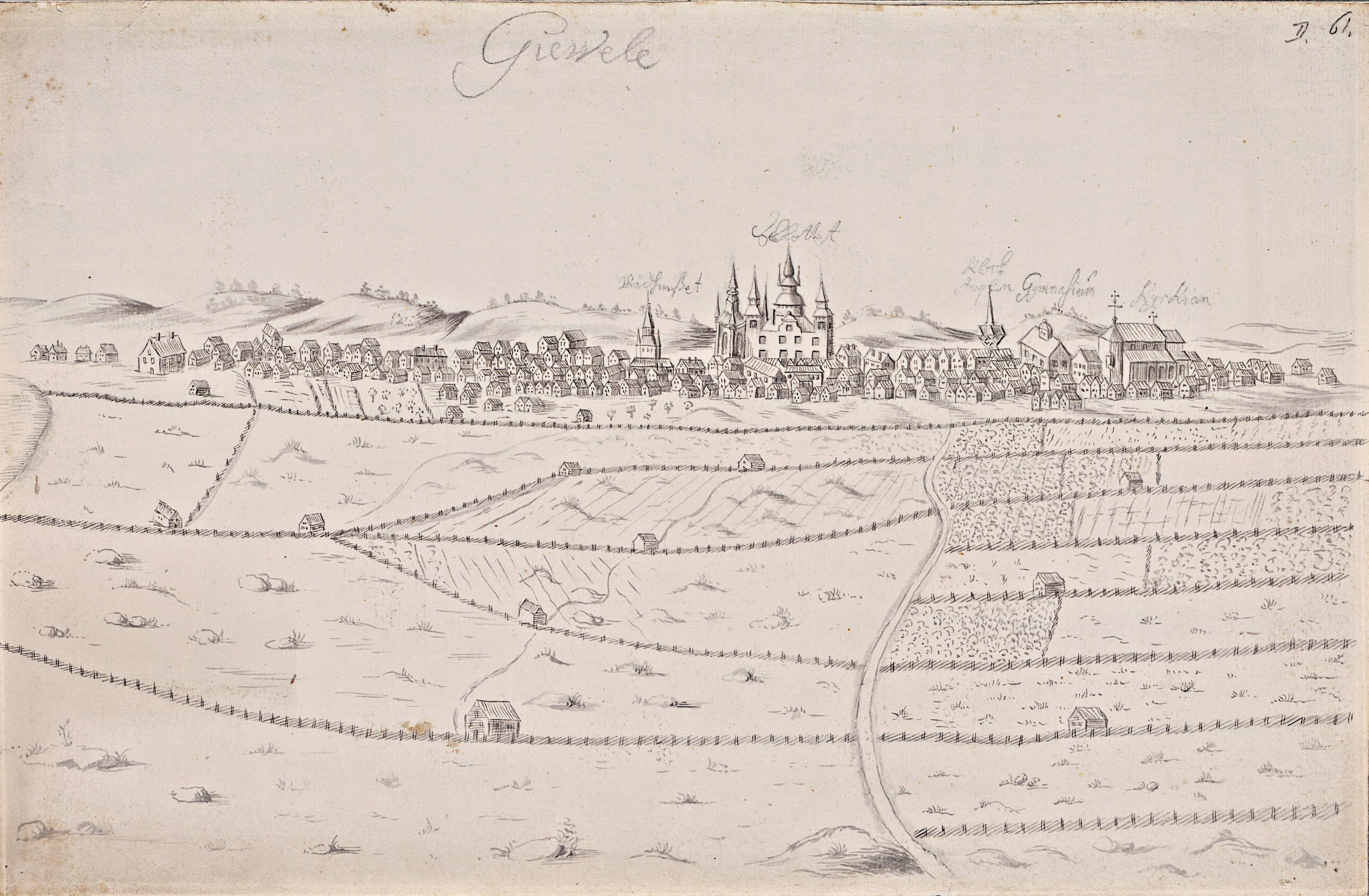
Gävle at the end of the 17th century. The five most prominent buildings are (from left to right): The town hall, the palace, the bell tower, the gymnasium and the church.

Over the last 300 years, Gävle has been ablaze on three occasions. After the fire of 1776, the town was rebuilt with straight streets and rectangular city blocks. The number of stone and brick houses also started to increase. The biggest town fire occurred 1869, when out of a population of around 10,000 approximately 8,000 inhabitants lost their homes, and about 350 farms were destroyed. Almost the whole town north of Gavleån was burnt down. All the buildings south of Gavleån were saved. An area of the old town between the museum and the library has been preserved to this day as a historic reserve, Gamla Gefle.

After the catastrophe of the fire Gävle developed its characteristic grid plan with large esplanades and green areas. It is now a green town with wide avenues. Stopping the spread of future town fires was the main idea behind this development.

In July 1719 Hugo Hamilton, who built Fredriksskans fort, defended Gävle against Russian attacks. After attacking along the coast, the Russian forces, numbering 5000 and under the command of Peter von Lacy, attacked Gävle from the south along the road from Harnäs which they had recently occupied. Hamilton stopped them outside of the city near Järvsta. The Russians instead tried to attack the city from the sea but the 10 cannon battery at Fredriksskans were sufficient to turn away their forces 3 times. A final attempt was made to take the city by landing forces to the north at Engesberg. Hamilton quickly moved the defending forces northward to stop the attack. On 2 August von Lacy gave up and sailed homewards with his forces.

An extensive redevelopment of the central town area was started during the 1950s. Around 1970 Gävle became a large urban district when it was united with the nearby municipalities of Valbo, Hamrånge, Hedesunda, and Hille. New suburbs like Stigslund, Sätra, Andersberg, and Bomhus have grown up around the central city.

In the middle of the 1800s to the beginning of the 1900s, there was a bad harvest and a high unemployment rate in Sweden. At the same time, political and religious oppression occurred, and religious encounters outside the State Church were not allowed. This led many Swedes to emigrate to other countries such as the United States. During the early emigration era, Gävle was one of the cities from which people left on their journey to the US. People from parts of Gästrikland and other neighboring counties made their way to the harbor town of Gävle and then commenced their departure to America.

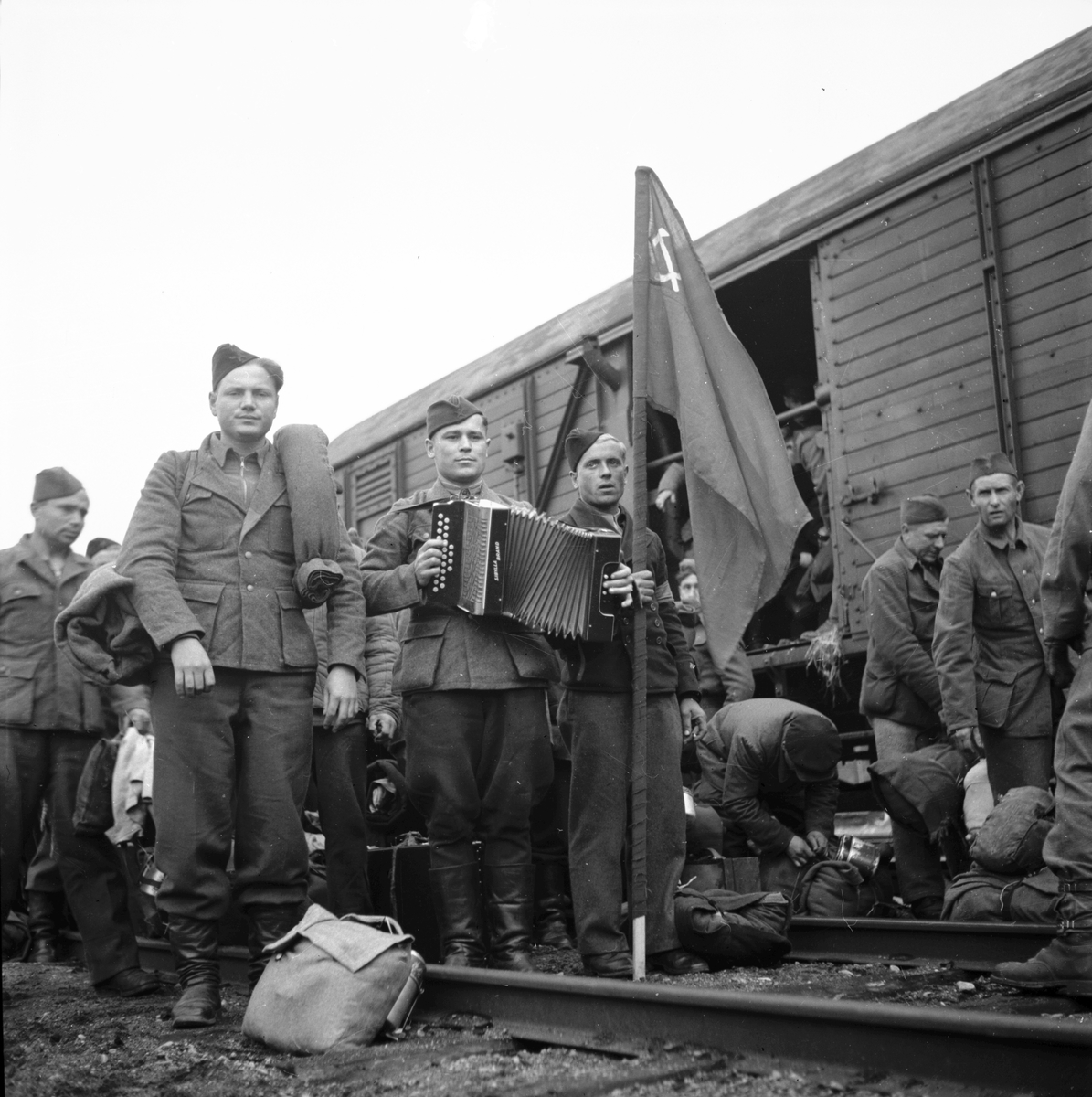
Soviet POWs in Gävle before departure to Soviet Union

50,000 Russians who were in Germany at the outbreak of the First World War traveled up through Sweden to Gävle where they gathered at the harbor before setting off via steamboat back to Russia.

The Harbor in Gävle was used for trade during the First World War and as a result some ships from Gävle were sunk during the German unrestricted submarine warfare campaign. One such example was the sailing vessel Jönköping, which was sunk on its way to Raumo from Gävle with a cargo of cognac and champagne for the Tsar. A Finnish cargo vessel was sunk off the coast in Gävle.

In June 1945, 800 Soviet prisoners of war transited from Oslo to Gävle, whence they were transported aboard the boat Aldebaran across the Baltic Sea to the Soviet Union.

In 1986 as a result of the Chernobyl disaster, Gävle was subjected to a severe deposition of radionuclides, exceeding 185 kBq per square meter. The impact was much greater than experienced by other regions of western Europe and as such, Gävle became one of the most affected areas outside of the Soviet Union. Between 1905 and 1997, the I14 Regiment was located in Gävle.

In 2022 the City Library Building, constructed in 1962, was demolished to make room for a modern cultural center known as Agnes Kulturhus. During his jubilee visit to the city in 2023, King Carl XVI Gustaf toured the construction site of the cultural center and gifted it a plaque commemorating the visit and Time Capsule. As of October 2023 the Cultural Center is still under construction.

Around 2 a.m. on 4 October 2025, six people were injured after being shot in the Söder neighbourhood of Gävle. A 13-year old boy was arrested in connection with the case. Prime Minister Ulf Kristersson and Minister for Justice Gunnar Strömmer visited the crime scene.

== Geography ==
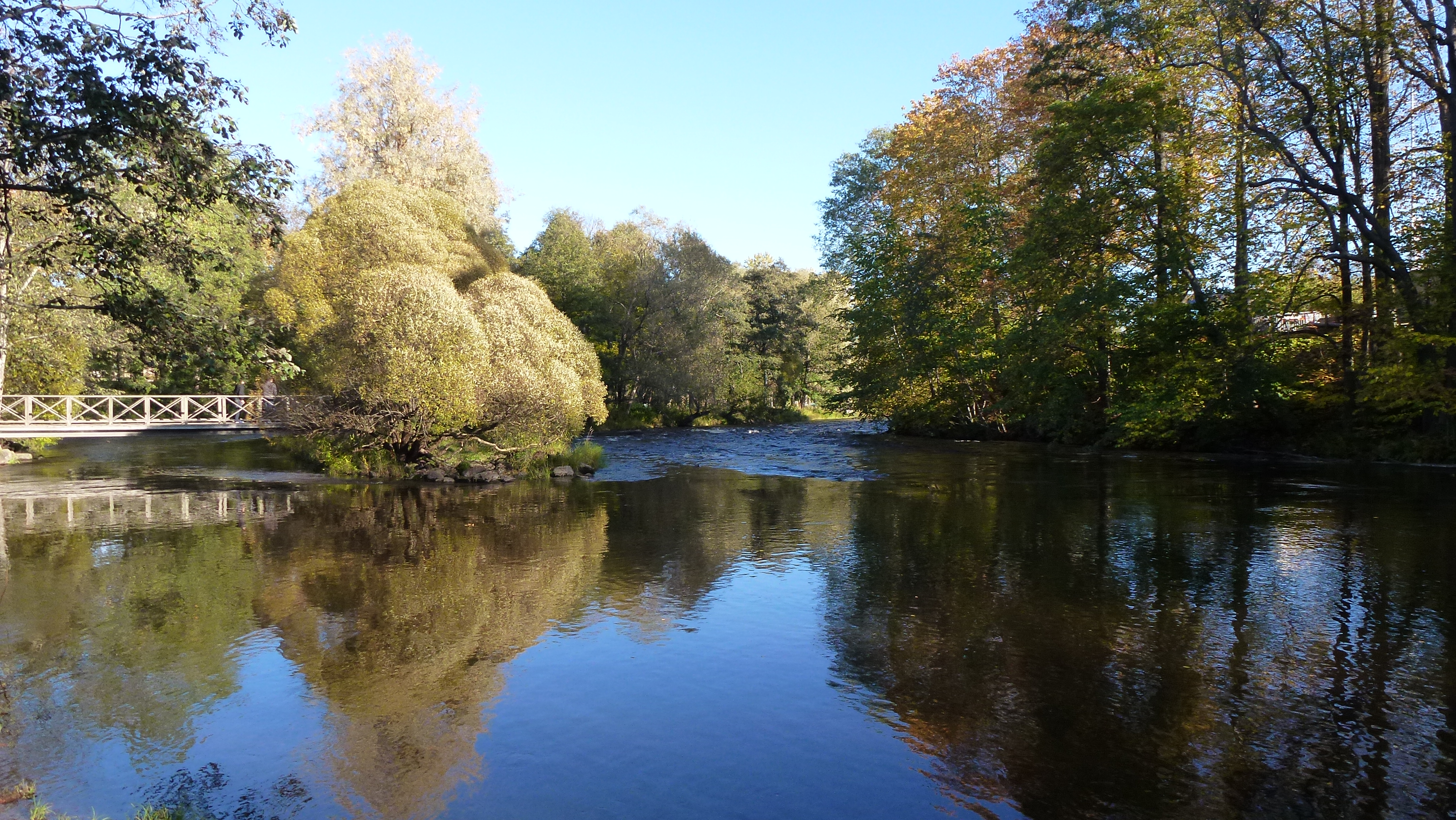
Gävle park with the river Gavleån

Gävle is situated by the Baltic Sea near the mouth of the river Dalälven. At 60 degrees north and 17 degrees east, Gävle has the same latitude as Helsinki and the same longitude as Vienna and Cape Town. Bordering municipalities are Söderhamn, Ockelbo, Sandviken, Heby, Tierp and Älvkarleby. Twenty kilometers west of Gävle lies Sandviken.

== Climate ==
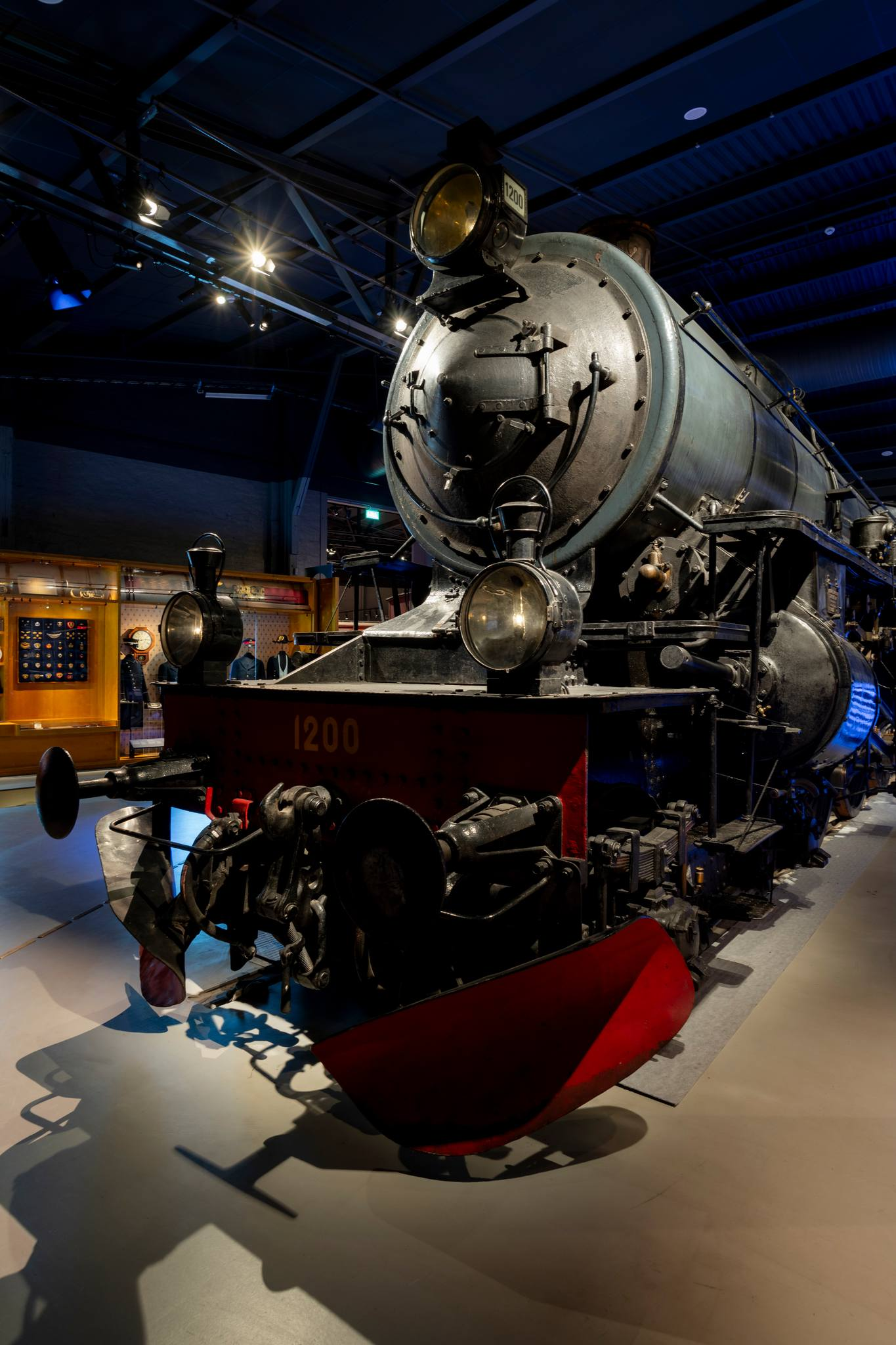

Gävle has a similar climate to the rest of central Sweden with winter highs just below freezing and summer highs a bit above 20 °C (68 °F). The average yearly precipitation is around 600 mm (23.62 in). Under the Köppen climate classification Gävle is classified as humid continental (Dfb) in spite of significant maritime influence. It is one of the northernmost cities of significant size in the world with this climate type, areas north of the 60th latitude for the most part are dominated by various subarctic climate types. Under the 1961-1990 normals, Gävle's fourth warmest month was around the 10 °C (50 °F) isotherm, so is not be classified as subarctic, but temperatures did rise sufficiently to be clear humid continental since.

While precipitation usually is moderate, in August 2021, Gävle was hit by a flash flood after recording 160 millimetres (6.3 in) of rainfall in one day. Considerable flooding occurred in multiple regions with entire neighborhoods flooded. Vehicles were submerged and landslides occurred. At least 10 heavy rain reports were reported.

Climate data for Gävle (2002–2021 averages; extremes since 1901)
Month	Jan	Feb	Mar	Apr	May	Jun	Jul	Aug	Sep	Oct	Nov	Dec	Year
Record high °C (°F)	11.0 (51.8)	12.5 (54.5)	18.3 (64.9)	27.1 (80.8)	28.9 (84.0)	36.4 (97.5)	34.4 (93.9)	34.0 (93.2)	28.0 (82.4)	22.7 (72.9)	15.0 (59.0)	11.7 (53.1)	36.4 (97.5)
Mean maximum °C (°F)	6.2 (43.2)	8.0 (46.4)	13.6 (56.5)	18.3 (64.9)	24.0 (75.2)	27.1 (80.8)	28.8 (83.8)	27.4 (81.3)	22.9 (73.2)	16.3 (61.3)	11.2 (52.2)	7.4 (45.3)	29.8 (85.6)
Mean daily maximum °C (°F)	−0.4 (31.3)	0.7 (33.3)	4.7 (40.5)	10.0 (50.0)	15.1 (59.2)	19.5 (67.1)	22.2 (72.0)	21.2 (70.2)	16.6 (61.9)	9.7 (49.5)	4.5 (40.1)	1.3 (34.3)	10.4 (50.8)
Daily mean °C (°F)	−3.8 (25.2)	−2.9 (26.8)	0.2 (32.4)	4.9 (40.8)	9.7 (49.5)	14.2 (57.6)	16.7 (62.1)	15.8 (60.4)	11.7 (53.1)	6.0 (42.8)	1.9 (35.4)	−1.5 (29.3)	6.1 (42.9)
Mean daily minimum °C (°F)	−7.1 (19.2)	−6.5 (20.3)	−4.3 (24.3)	−0.2 (31.6)	4.2 (39.6)	8.7 (47.7)	11.2 (52.2)	10.4 (50.7)	6.8 (44.2)	2.2 (36.0)	−0.7 (30.7)	−4.3 (24.3)	1.7 (35.1)
Mean minimum °C (°F)	−20.1 (−4.2)	−18.9 (−2.0)	−14.7 (5.5)	−6.3 (20.7)	−2.6 (27.3)	2.5 (36.5)	5.0 (41.0)	3.1 (37.6)	−0.9 (30.4)	−5.5 (22.1)	−10.0 (14.0)	−15.0 (5.0)	−23.7 (−10.7)
Record low °C (°F)	−30.4 (−22.7)	−33.7 (−28.7)	−29.9 (−21.8)	−17.9 (−0.2)	−7.3 (18.9)	−4.5 (23.9)	1.0 (33.8)	−2.2 (28.0)	−5.7 (21.7)	−15.1 (4.8)	−22.5 (−8.5)	−30.3 (−22.5)	−33.7 (−28.7)
Average precipitation mm (inches)	36.5 (1.44)	26.8 (1.06)	26.1 (1.03)	23.1 (0.91)	43.7 (1.72)	67.2 (2.65)	61.5 (2.42)	92.7 (3.65)	45.4 (1.79)	67.2 (2.65)	46.0 (1.81)	40.7 (1.60)	576.9 (22.73)
Average extreme snow depth cm (inches)	31 (12)	39 (15)	31 (12)	13 (5.1)	0 (0)	0 (0)	0 (0)	0 (0)	0 (0)	2 (0.8)	10 (3.9)	20 (7.9)	47 (19)
Source 1: SMHI Open Data
Source 2: SMHI climate data 2002–2018

== Economy ==
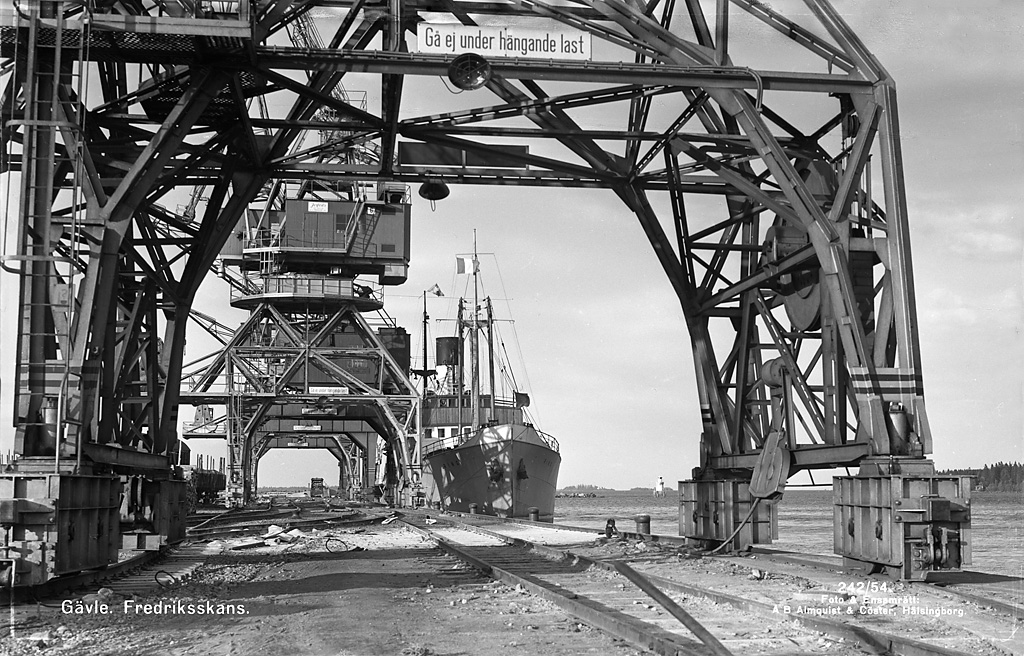
View of the harbour, approx. 1940-1959

Trade from the port of Gävle increased markedly during the 15th century when copper and iron began to be exported from the port. In order to ensure that all trade was via Stockholm, sailing to foreign ports from Gävle and a few other ports was forbidden.

During the 16th century, Gävle was one of the most important port and merchant towns with many shipping companies and shipyards.

In 1787 Gävle was awarded "free and unrestricted sailing rights" to and from foreign ports. This led to an increase in trade, which in turn led to an increase in buildings, industrial developments, trade and shipping.

From 1910-1979 Gefle Porslinfabrik produced porslin products. The factory, locally named 'Pottan' struggled during the First World War to get clay that would allow them to continue producing high quality products. Due to high transport and coal costs the factory had to raise the prices of their products by 40%.

Today there are few shipping companies or shipyards left, but an important port remains. It has over 1000 ships calling per year and is among the top ten common ports in Sweden.

=== Major companies ===
- BillerudKorsnäs (pulp and paper industry)
- Jacobs Douwe Egberts S.E. AB (Gevalia coffee)
- Cale Industri (parking meters)
- Cibes Lifts (lifts for buildings)

== Demography ==
• Population: About 102,000 residents.

• Age Distribution: The population has a balanced age distribution, with a significant proportion of young adults, working-age residents, and an older population. The city has a sizable student presence due to its proximity to the University of Gävle.

• Ethnic Composition: Gävle has a diverse population, with Swedish-born citizens being the majority of the population.

• Gender Ratio: The gender distribution is quite balanced, with slightly more women than men.

• Economy: Gävle has a mixed economy with strong sectors in services, logistics, manufacturing, and education. The Port of Gävle is one of Sweden’s largest export harbors.

== Culture ==
Gävle has an active cultural scene and is associated with musical groups including The Deer Tracks and The Sound of Arrows. The city was a candidate to become the Swedish designation for the European Capital of Culture in 2014, however the final shortlist was Umeå and Lund, with Umeå being awarded the title alongside Riga, Latvia.

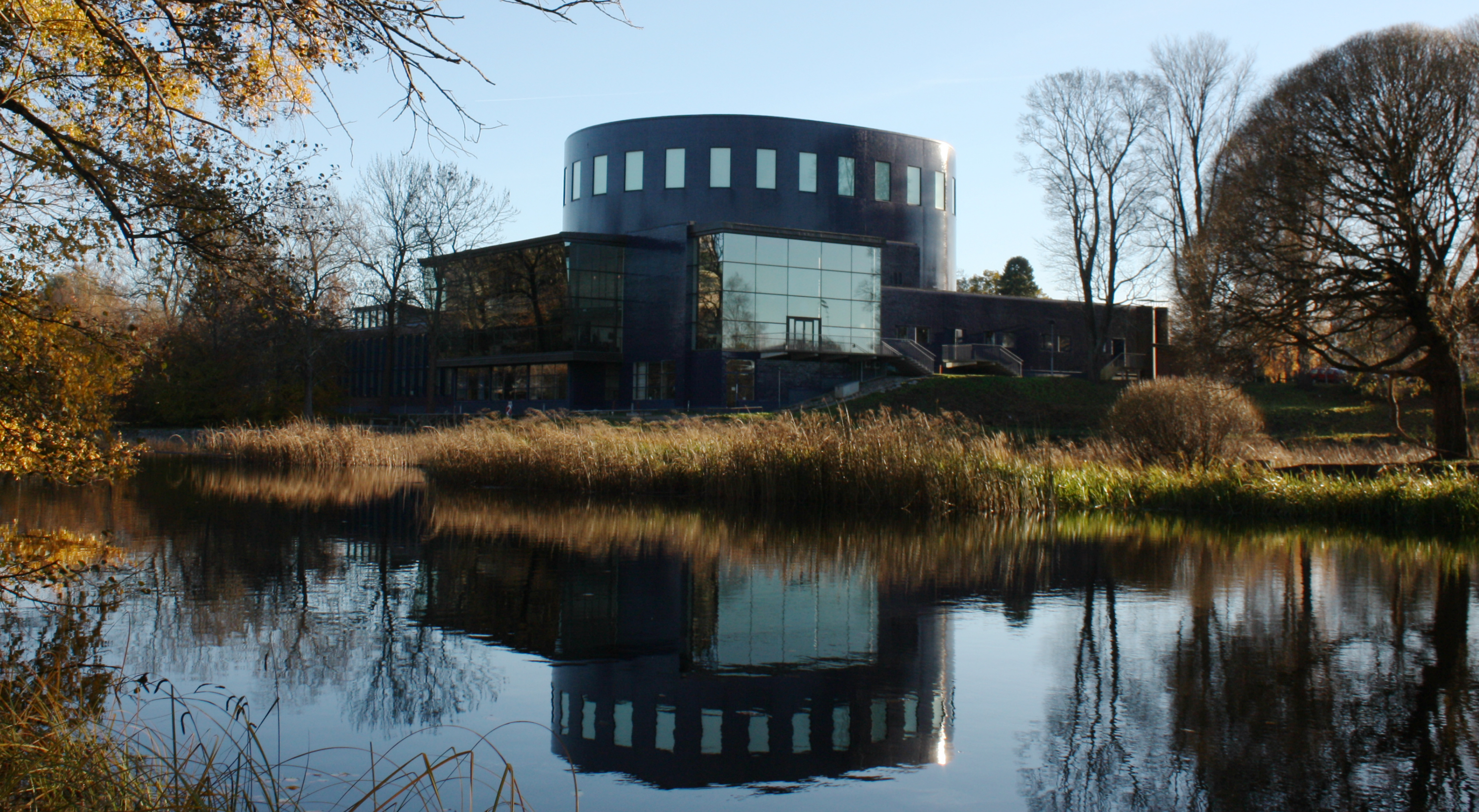
Gävle concert hall, home of the Gävle Symphony Orchestra

=== Arts and museums ===
The Prison Museum of Sweden, the county museum of Gävleborg, and the national railway museum are the three largest museums in the city. The prison museum is located near Gävle Castle and depicts the history of crime and punishment in Sweden. The county museum (located downtown) hosts an art collection spanning from the 1600s to present time and well as a section dedicated to cultural history. Finally, the Swedish Railway Museum (Rälsgatan 1), hosts a collection that began to accumulate in 1906 in Stockholm and which was moved to Gävle in 1970.

Gävle has a theater dating back to the 1800s. It is still used for performances today, including classic theater, opera, variety and stand-up.

The Gävle Concert Hall was inaugurated in 1998. It is home to the 1912 Gävle Symphony Orchestra, whose principal conductor is Jaime Martín.

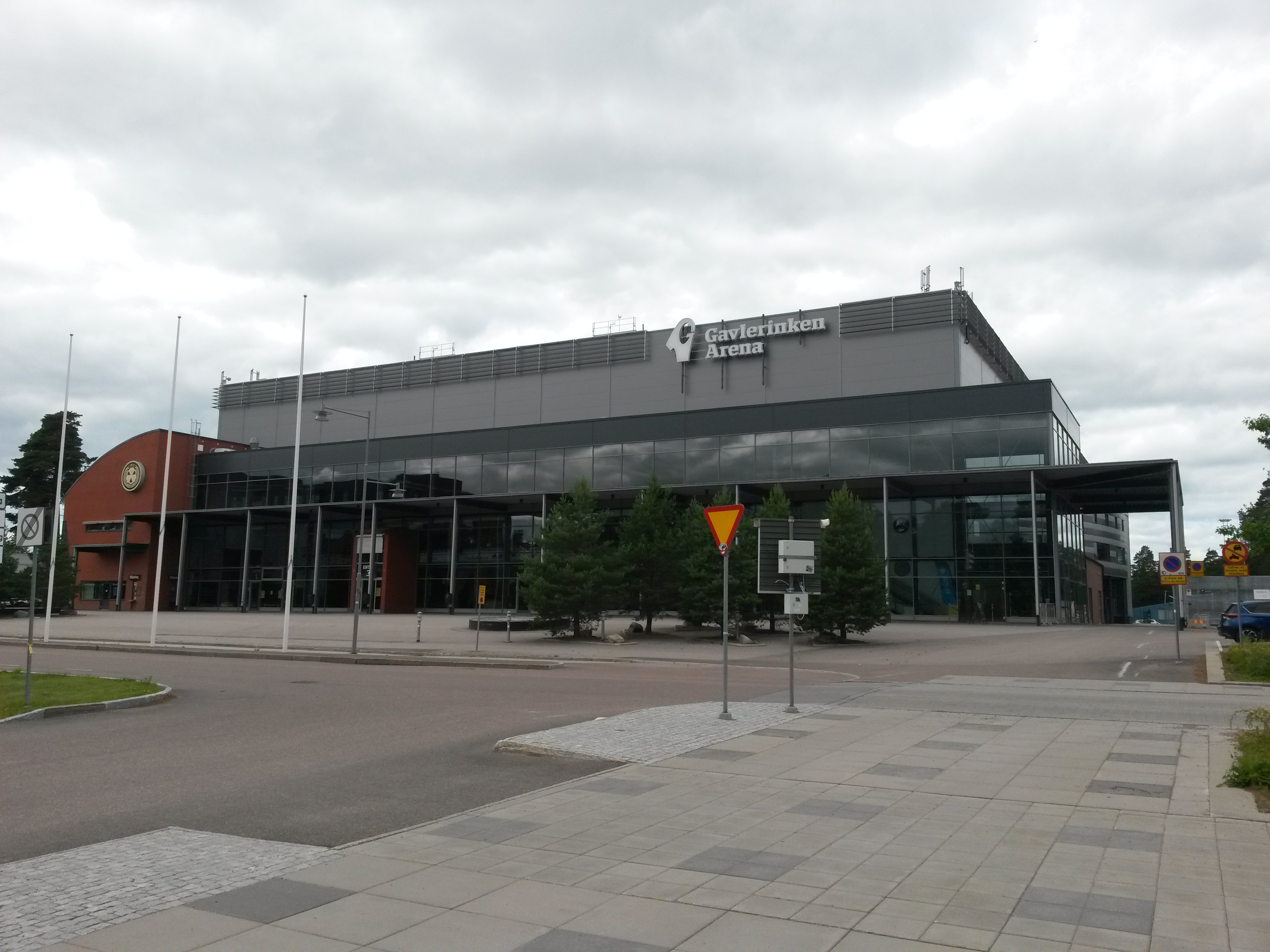
Gavlerinken, home of Brynäs IF

=== Sports ===
Gävle's most well-known sports club is ice hockey club Brynäs IF, competing in the highest national league. Other successful clubs are Gefle IF (football and athletics) and Gävle GIK (floorball).

Ice hockey

- Brynäs IF

Football

- Gefle IF
- Brynäs IF FK

Bowling

- Gävle KK
- Gävle BWK
Speed skating
- Hagaströms SK

Baseball

- Gefle baseboll

Floorball

- Gävle GIK
- IBK Runsten

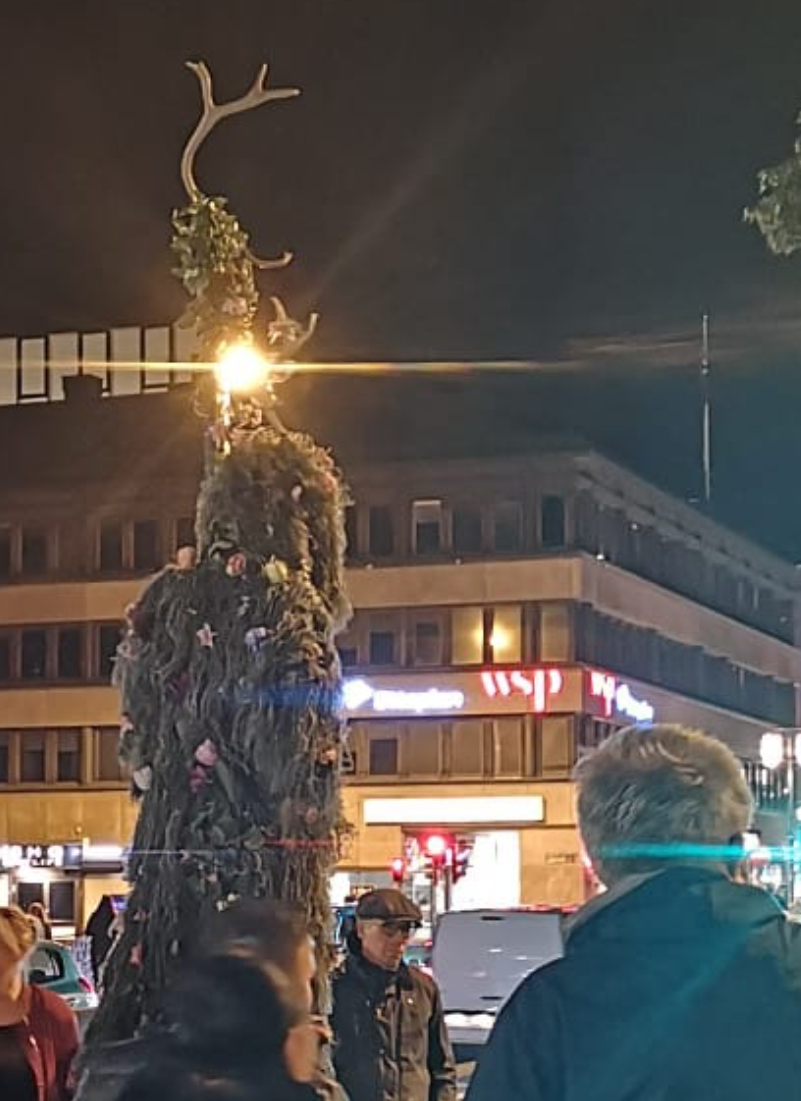
A Flower Troll at the Å-Draget festivities 2022

=== Religion ===
The city is part of the Gävle parish. As of September 2025 had 43,500 members, making it the second-largest parish in Sweden. Its most-visited church is Holy Trinity Church.

The city also has at least two mosques, the Gävle Mosque which primarily serves Sunni Muslims, and another for Shia Muslims.

=== Annual events ===
Each September Gävle Kommun organises a Å-Draget weekend where outdoor candles are lit along the banks of the Gavle River in an attempt to highlight its beauty and its importance to the city. The kommun organises different performances and activities for residents and visitors to enjoy as the walk along the river.

== Media ==
Gefle Dagblad founded in 1895 and Arbetarbladet are the two leading media outlets covering Gävle in the papers. Both have a long history dating back to the early 1900s and the late 1800s, respectively. Aside from this, the Swedish national public TV broadcaster, SVT, has an editorial office in the city and the national public radio Sveriges Radio broadcasts from the city.

== Education ==
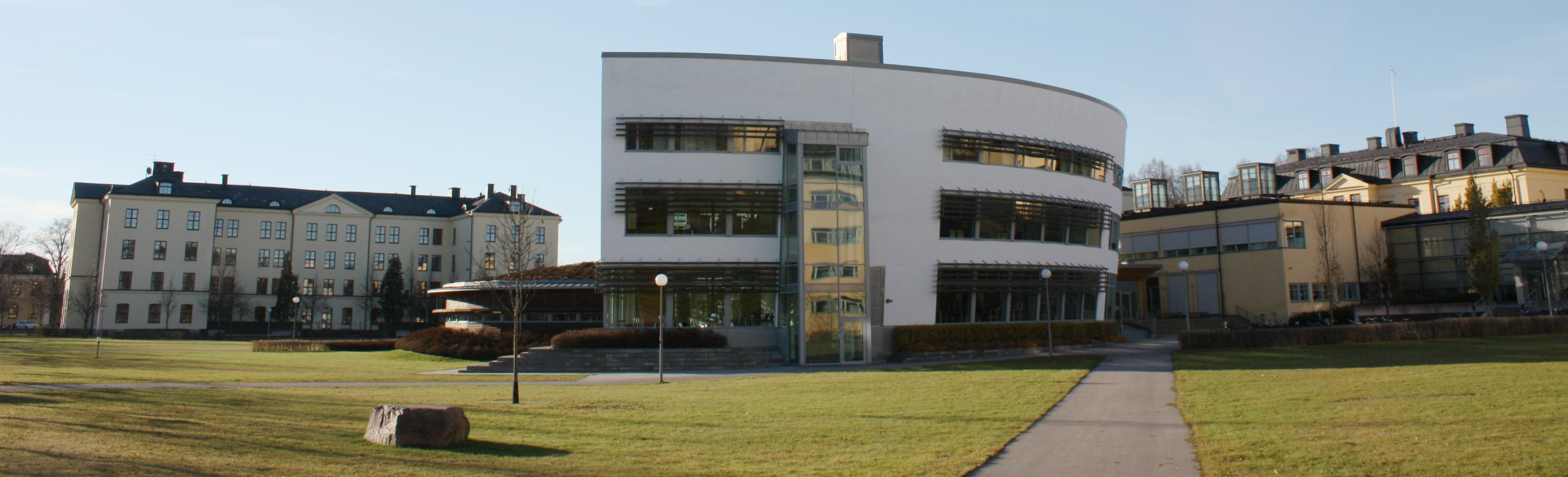
Gävle University College

The University College of Gävle enrolls 16,000 students as of 2022. It offers over 800 courses and around 50 degree programs in technology, social and natural sciences, and the humanities. Its research profiles are "Built Environment" ("Byggd miljö") and "Health in working life" ("Hälsofrämjande arbetsliv"). Some courses are offered in English and are taken by both international and Swedish students.

== Infrastructure ==
=== Transport ===
Mälardalstrafik operates trains between Gävle and Uppsala.

The area was previously served by Gävle–Sandviken Airport, also known as Rörberg Airport, which opened in 1971 and was open to commercial air traffic until 2000. In 2016, Gävle City Council voted to close the airport.

Stockholm Arlanda Airport is located 137 km (85 mi) south of Gävle.

=== Healthcare ===
Gävle Hospital has approximately 300 physicians, and serves an area of approximately 150,000 people. It has a centre for clinical research in cooperation with Uppsala University.

== Miscellaneous ==
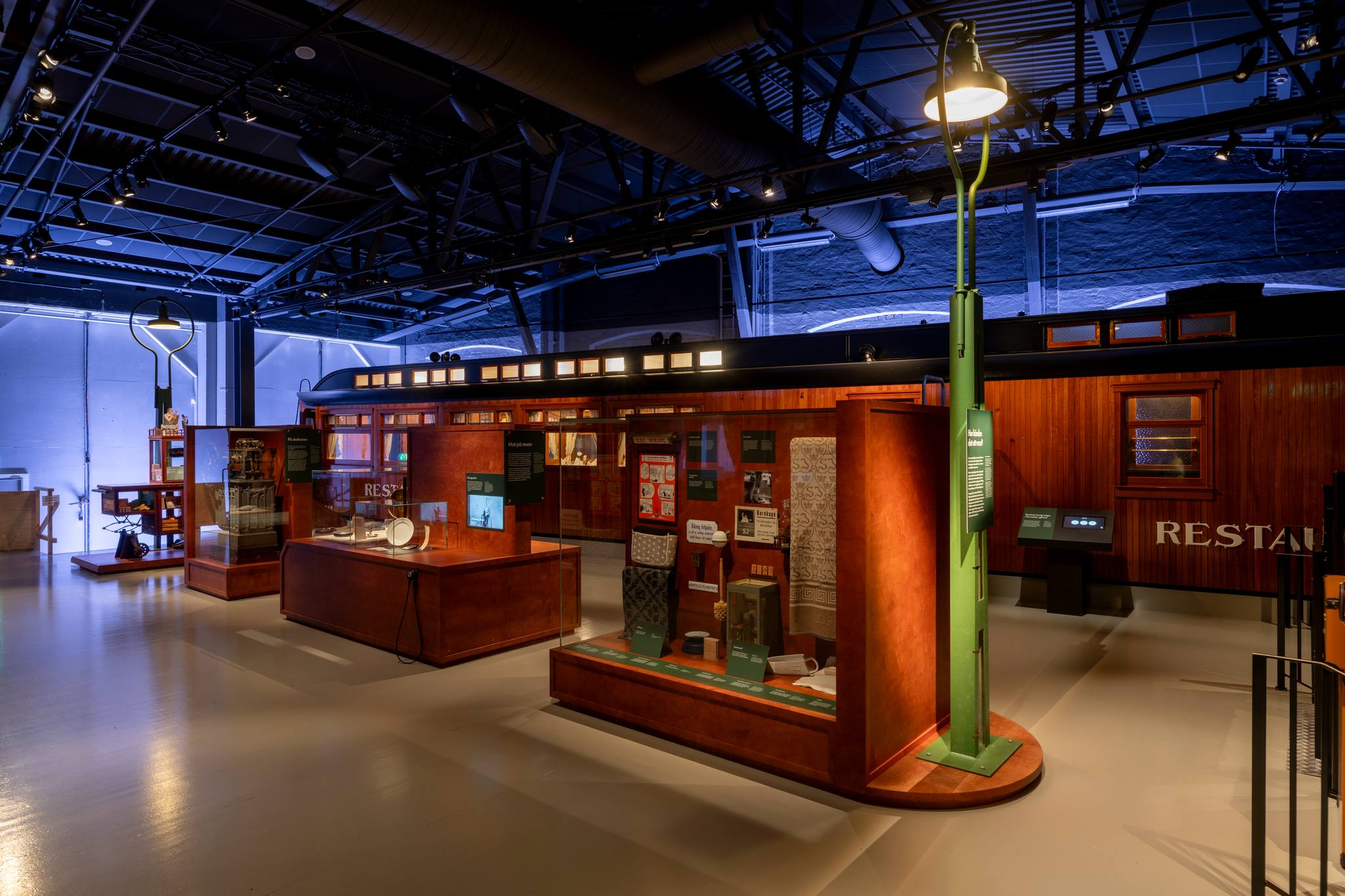

Gävle is known for being the birthplace of the Gevalia coffee brand, which is produced by Kraft General Foods Scandinavia and exported around the globe. Gevalia is particularly popular in the Americas and produces dozens of unique flavored coffees for the United States that are not available to its customers in Europe. However, visitors who come to the factory in Gävle can sample many of the premium blends. (Gevalia is the Latin name for Gävle).

Other brands from Gävle include the throat lozenges Läkerol and the car-shaped sweets Ahlgrens Bilar.

Gävle preserves the memory of the Swedish-American labor activist and martyr Joel Emmanuel Hägglund, better known as Joe Hill, who was born there in 1879. The Hägglund family home still stands in Gävle at the address Nedre Bergsgatan 28, in Gamla Stan, the Old Town. As of 2011 it houses a museum and the Joe Hill-gården, which hosts cultural events.

=== Gävle goat ===
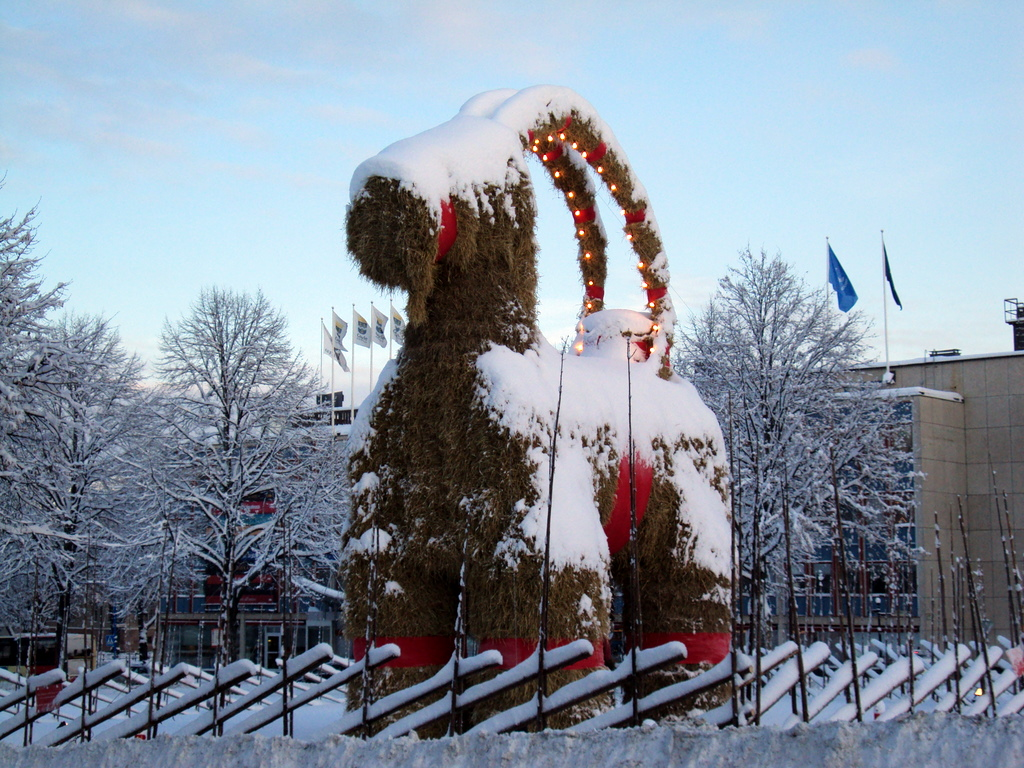
The Gävle Goat in 2009.

The history of the Gävle goat began in 1966. Stig Gavlén came up with the idea of placing a giant version of the traditional Swedish Christmas goat of straw in Slottstorget (Castle Square) in central Gävle. On 1 December the 13-metre tall, 7-metre long, 3 tonne goat was erected on the square. At midnight on New Year's Eve, the goat went up in flames. The goat has since had a history of being burnt almost every year, 2005 being the 22nd time it was burnt. Burning the goat is an illegal act and not welcomed by most citizens of Gävle, but undoubtedly this is what has made the goat famous. In 2006 the goat was covered in a flame-resistant coating to prevent arson, enabling the goat to remain standing throughout that winter. On 27 December 2015, the goat was burnt for the 28th time. In its 59-year history, the goat has been burnt down 39 times.

== Notable people ==
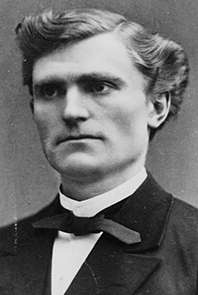
Hans Forssell

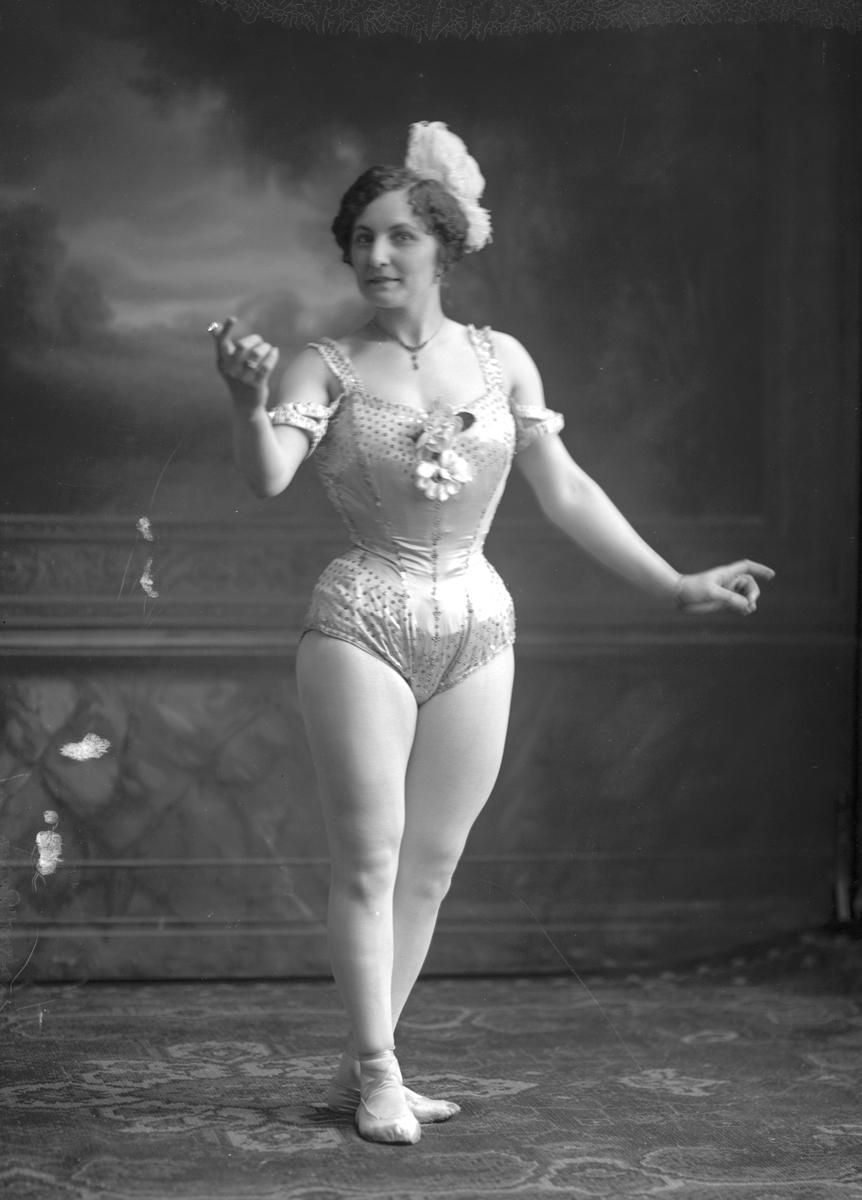
Valborg Elisabeth Groning, La Bella Ingeborg

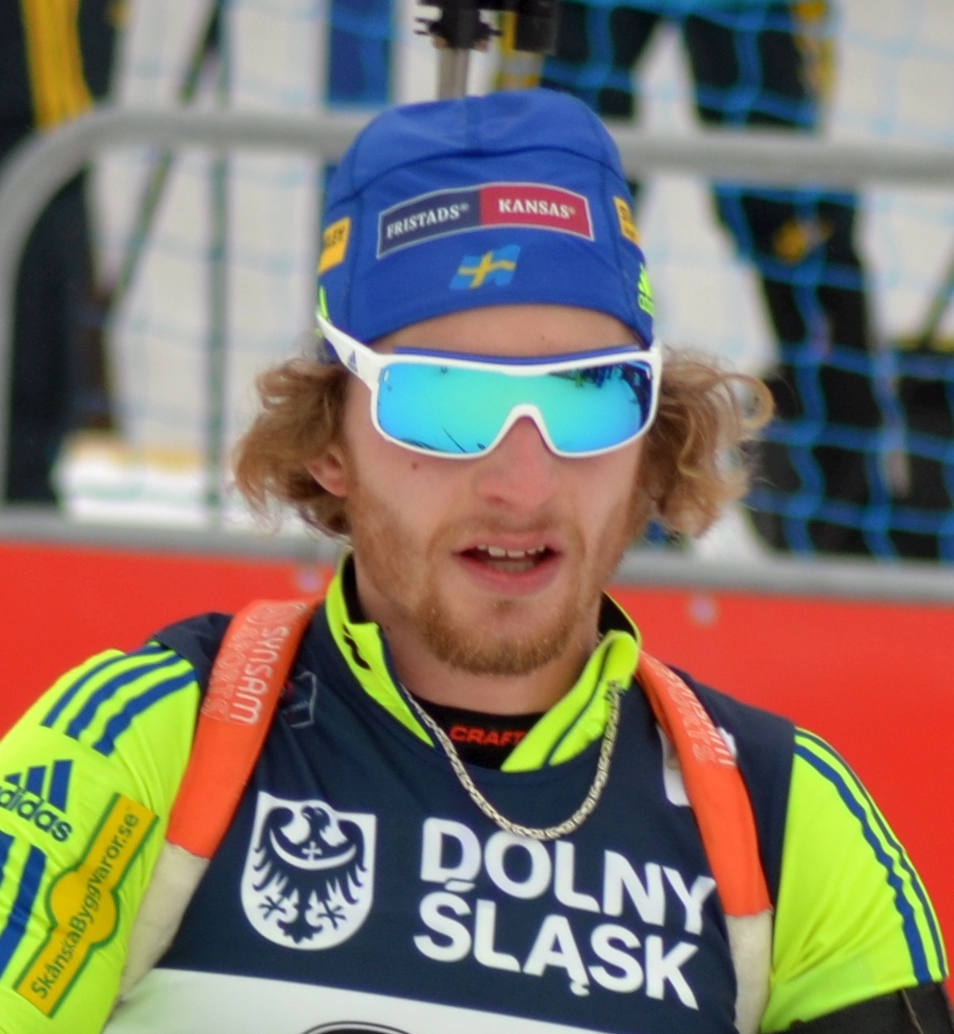
Peppe Femling

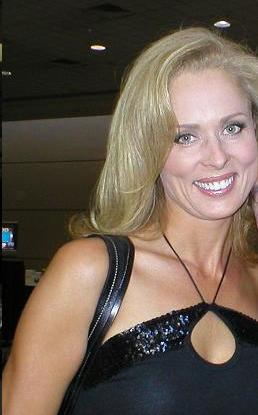
Ewa Laurence

- Linn Ahlborg (born 1999) Swedish blogger and influencer
- Siri Andersson-Palmestav (1903–2002) writer and missionary
- Anna Bartels (1869–1950), opera singer
- Alexandra Dahlström (born 1984) actress and film director
- Thomas Di Leva (born 1963) singer and songwriter
- John E. Forsgren (1816–1890) the first Mormon missionary to preach in Sweden
- Hans Forssell (1843–1901) historian and political writer
- Åke Fridell (1919–1985) a film actor
- Erik Acharius (born 1757) botanist
- Valborg Elisabeth Groning (1890-1970) circus princess
- Joe Hill (1879–1915) labour activist and songwriter
- Rolf Lassgård (born 1955) actor
- Regina Lund (born 1967) actress and singer
- Åke Lundqvist (1936–2021) actor at Stockholm City Theatre
- Yat Malmgren (1916–2002) dancer and acting teacher at the Drama Centre London
- Andreas Rudman (1668–1708), pioneer Swedish American Lutheran minister
- Cat Stevens (born 1948) musician; his mother Ingrid Wickman was from Gävle, where he lived during his childhood
- Joakim Sundström (born 1965) sound editor, sound designer and musician
- Daniel Waluszewski (born 1982) novelist and children's author
- Lars-Åke Wilhelmsson (born 1958) fashion designer and drag artist

=== Sports professionals ===
- Nicklas Bäckström (born 1987) ice hockey player for the Washington Capitals
- Christian Edstrom (born 1976) rally co-driver
- Anders Eklund (1957–2010) Olympic heavyweight boxer
- Peppe Femling (born 1992) biathlete and Olympic gold medallist
- Andreas Johnsson (born 1994) ice hockey player for the San Jose Sharks
- Calle Järnkrok (born 1991) ice hockey player for the Toronto Maple Leafs
- Ewa Laurance (born 1964) pool player
- Oskar Lindblom (born 1996) ice hockey player for Brynas IF Gavle
- Anders Lindbäck (born 1988) ice hockey goaltender who has played for several NHL teams
- Elias Lindholm (born 1994) ice hockey player for the Boston Bruins
- Jacob Markström (born 1990) ice hockey player for the New Jersey Devils
- Christian Djoos (born 1994) ice hockey player for Brynas IF Gavle, Stanley Cup winner in 2018 with the Washington Capitals
- Felix Sandström (born 1997) ice hockey goaltender for the Rochester Americans
- Jakob Silfverberg (born 1990) ice hockey player for Brynas IF Gavle

== European cooperation ==
Gävle is a member city of Eurotowns network.

== Twin towns – sister cities ==
Gävle is twinned with five cities:

- Jūrmala, Latvia
- Galva, Illinois, United States
- Næstved, Denmark
- Rauma, Finland
- Gjøvik, Norway

== See also ==
- International Ice Hockey Federation World Championships (1995)
- List of Gävleborg Governors
- The Gävle fishermen
