= Trefaldighetskyrkan =

Trefaldighetskyrkan (Swedish) or Trefoldighetskirken (Norwegian) may refer to:

== In Sweden ==
- Trinity Church (Karlskrona)
- Trinity Church, Halmstad
- Trinity Church, Kristianstad

== In Norway ==
- Trinity Church (Arendal)
- Trinity Church (Oslo)

== See also ==
- Heliga Trefaldighets kyrka (disambiguation)
