= Heliga Trefaldighets kyrka =

Heliga Trefaldighets kyrka (Swedish: holy trinity church) may refer to:

- Holy Trinity Parish, Arboga
- Holy Trinity Church, Gävle
- Holy Trinity Church, Kristianstad
- Holy Trinity Church, Malmö
- Holy Trinity Church, Uppsala

== See also ==
- Holy Trinity Church (disambiguation)
- Trefaldighetskyrkan (disambiguation), Swedish churches named Trinity Church
