= Siri Andersson-Palmestav =

Swedish writer and missionary (1903–2002)

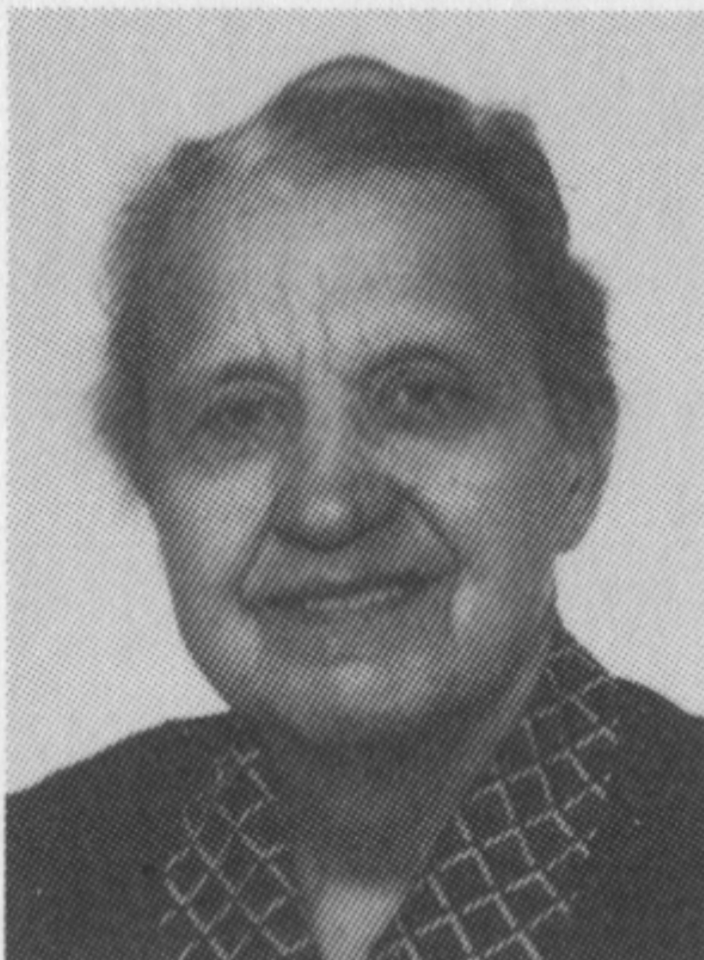
Siri Regina Palmestav (1960)

Siri Andersson-Palmestav (17 December 1903 – 6 March 2002) was a Swedish writer and missionary.

She was born in Gävle Parish, became a student, studying at Betelseminariet in Stockholm and at the Örebro School of Theology. She worked as missionary between 1928 and 1962 in Estonia, Poland and Germany. Andersson described in her books a martyrdom of Christians in communist Russia.

In 1957, she married Jakob Palmestav (1896–1981).

== Works ==
- Estland – en port till Ryssland (1942)
- Fronter som kalla (1945)
- Bildsnidarens son Skildring från Estland (1946)
- Människor i ruiner (1949)
- Hoppet som aldrig dog (1958)
- Vindringsstaven (1961)
- De kämpade för friheten (1963)
- Solen gick upp till sist (1964)
- Sovjetflickan (1965)
- I hamn efter stormig seglats (1965)
- Natten kom för tidigt (1967)
- Guds barn och barnbarn (1967)
- Den flyende nunnan (1971)
- De följde ett kors (1975)
- Han flydde ur sovjet för sin tros skull (1982)
- De fick hjälp (1986)
