= La Bella Ingeborg =

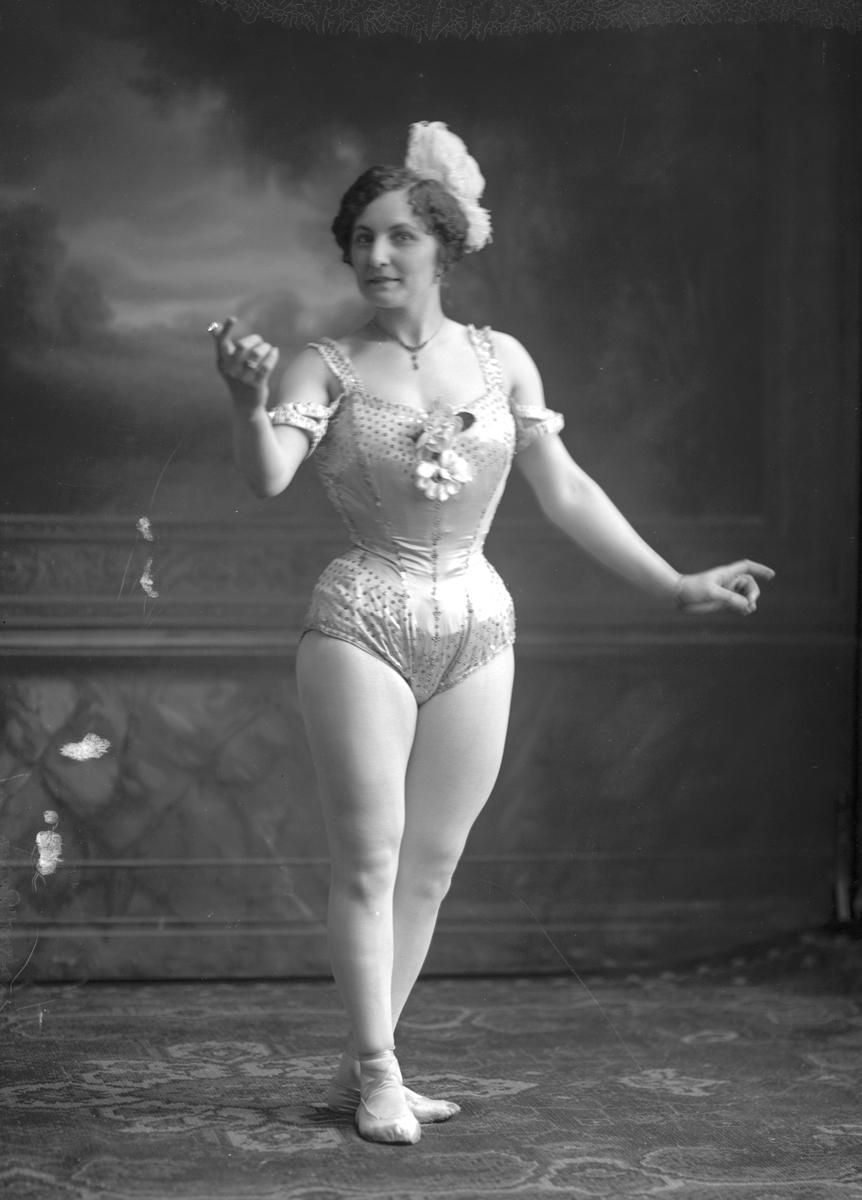
La Bella Ingeborg

La Bella Ingeborg (Valborg Elisabeth Gröning, but often referred to as Bojan), (Gävle 3 April 1890 – 24 December 1970) was a Swedish circus princess, introduced as "The Prodigy Child".

Ingeborg was born into poverty and put up for adoption at the age of four by circus artists Julia Andersson and Knut Lindberg. At age 15, she married a circus clown, Charles Bazola. They travelled around the world performing with the circus Fortuna & Bazola.

After Ingeborg gave birth to a daughter, Héléne Bazola, the couple moved back to Gävle. Ingeborg delivered newspapers for a living before she died in 1970. She is buried at the cemetery in Gävle, in a grave with other circus artists.
