= Gävle Castle =

Swedish palace

Coordinates: 60°40′20″N 17°08′39″E

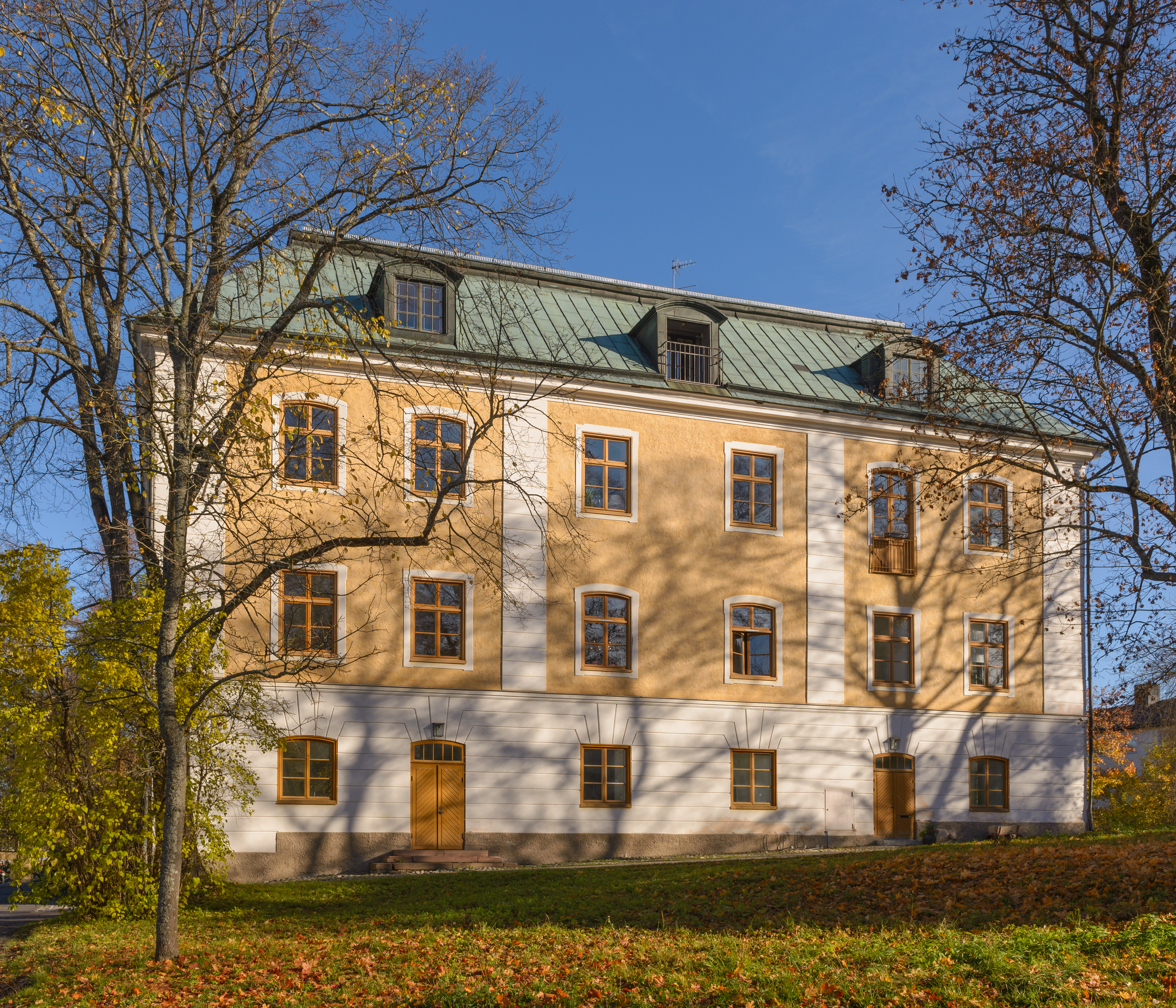
Gävle Castle

Gävle Castle is a palace in Gävle, Sweden, rebuilt several times since its foundation in 1583. It is the official residence of the County Governor of Gävleborg County.

== The first castle ==
The original castle was built in 1583–1593 by the Swedish crown. The architect was Willem Boy.

== Restoration ==
After several decades of decay, the castle was rebuilt during the 1650s and the 1660s. The castle now became the residence of the governor, and office of the provincial government.

== Rebuilding ==
A severe fire in 1727 destroyed large parts of the castle, and it was left in ruins until 1741 when Carl Hårleman was commissioned to rebuild it into a modern residence and government office. The rebuilding was completed in 1754.
