= The Bar (radio network) =

- Type: Radio network
- Country: United States
- Owner: Waitt Radio Networks (acquired by Triton Media Group)

The Bar was a 24-hour music network produced by Waitt Radio Networks. Its playlist was composed of Country/Rock music spanning from the 1960s to the 2000s from artists such as George Strait, The Eagles, Toby Keith, Bob Seger & The Silver Bullet Band, and Johnny Cash. It mainly targeted listeners ages 18–54. The satellite-driven feed got its name from a Bar, an establishment that usually serves alcoholic beverages to its customers.

Waitt Radio Networks was acquired by Triton Media Group in 2008. The network's formats were eventually managed by Dial Global (later Westwood One) following a merger in 2011.

While most affiliates used "The Bar" imagery, one station (in a dry i.e. no alcohol sales area) formerly used the alternative branding of "The West Texas JukeBox." That station was KBXJ in Los Ybanez, Texas (now a Jack FM affiliate).
