= Trinity Church, Halmstad =

Coordinates: 56.6786°N 12.8527°E

Trinity Church
- Slottskyrkan
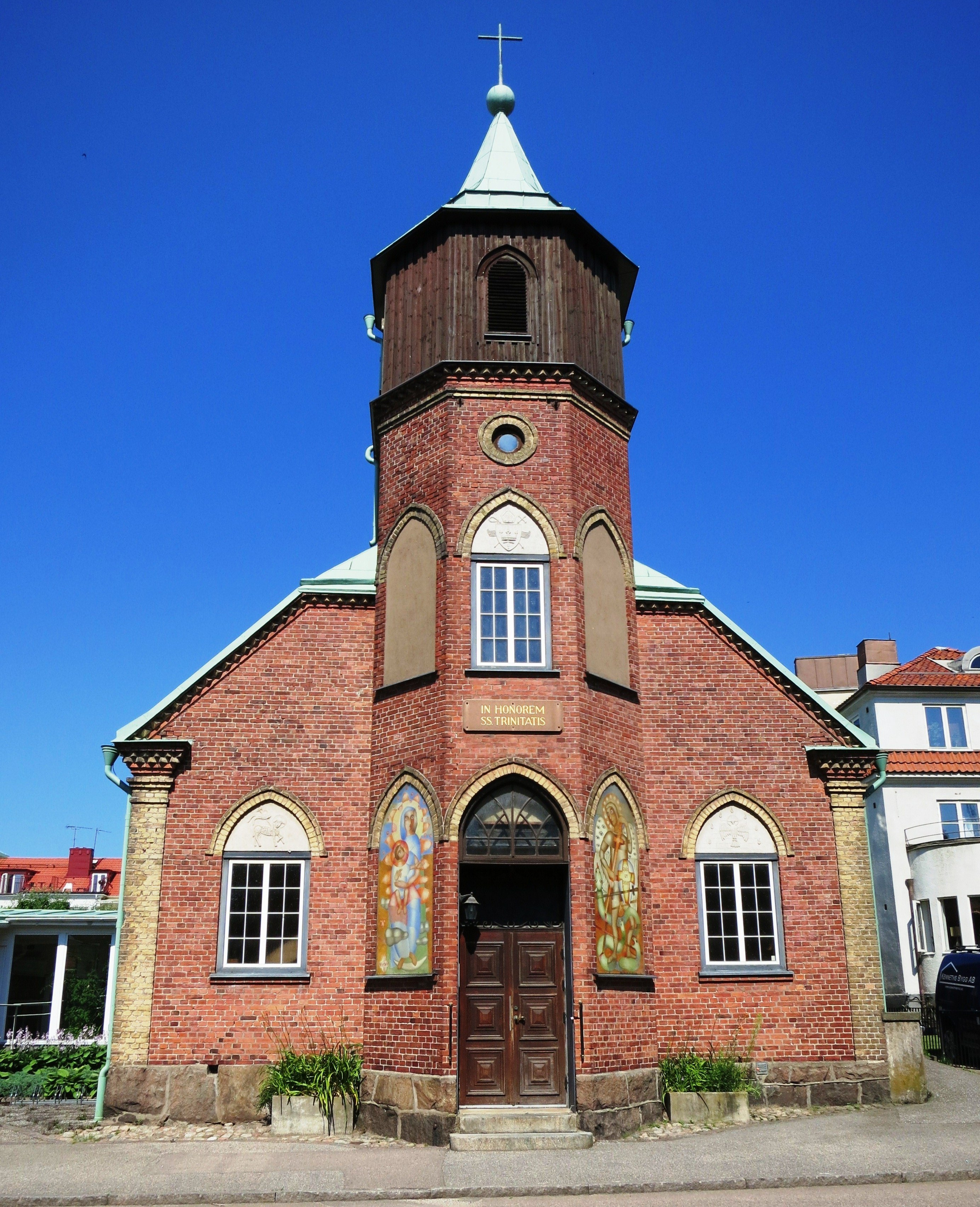
- Trinity Church in July 2012
- Trinity Church
- Location: Halmstad
- Country: Sweden
- Denomination: Roman Catholic Church of Sweden

History
- Consecrated: 24 May 1981

Administration
- Diocese: Stockholm
- Parish: Saint Mary

Trinity Church (Swedish: Trefaldighetskyrkan) is a Roman Catholic church in Halmstad in Sweden. It is part of Saint Mary's Roman Catholic Parish within the Catholic Diocese of Stockholm.

It was opened on 24 May 1981.
