= Holy Trinity Church, Gävle =

Church in Gävle, Sweden

Coordinates: 60.6727°N 17.1381°E

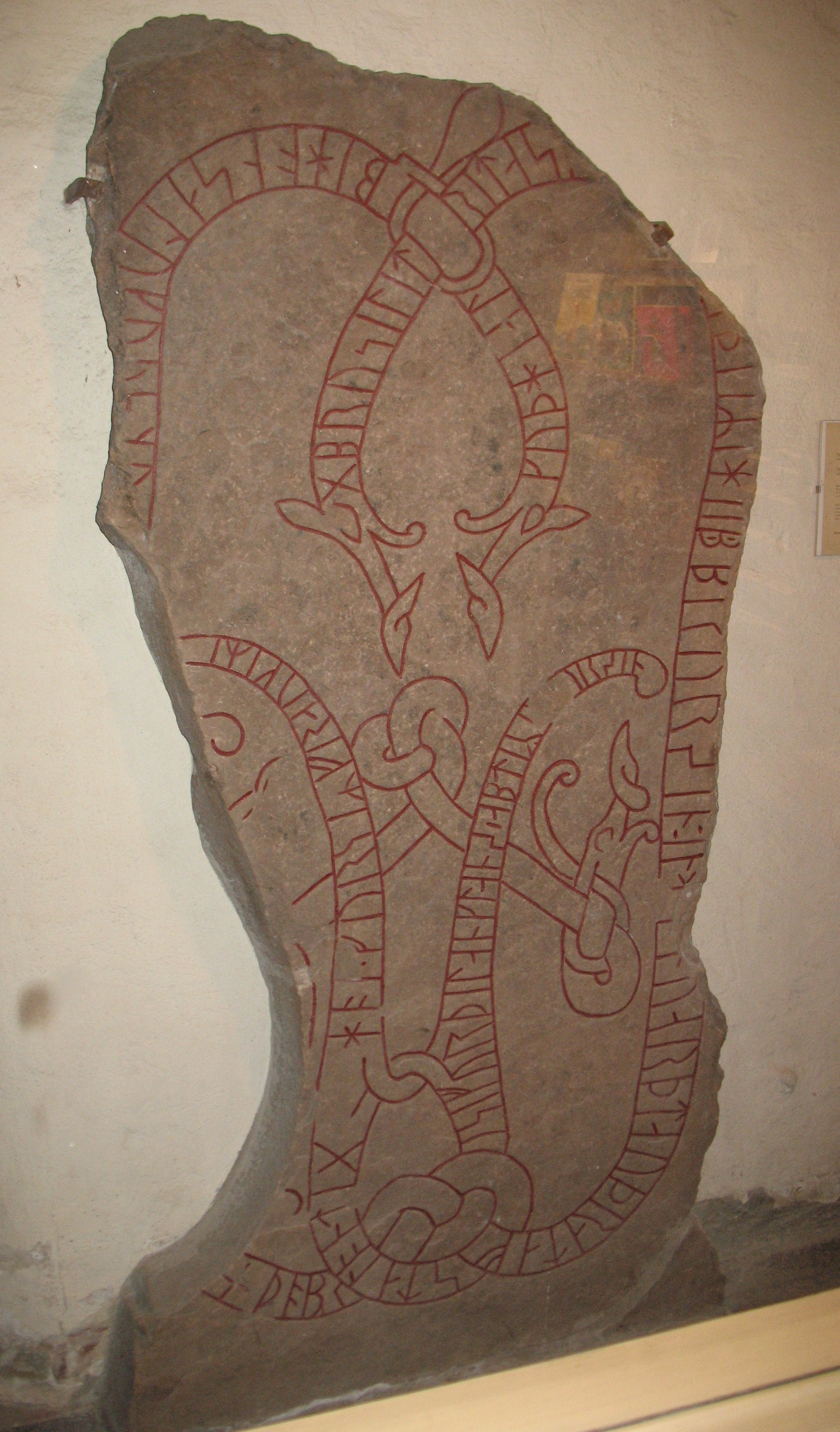
The Sörby runestone

The Church of the Holy Trinity (Swedish: Heliga Trefaldighets kyrka) is the oldest church in Gävle, Sweden, and was inaugurated on 14 July 1654 on the foundation of a medieval church that was burned down.

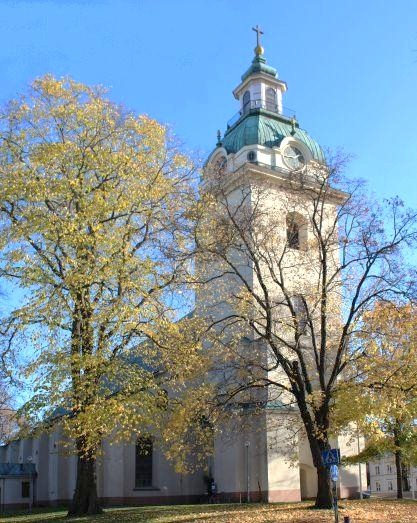
Heliga Trefaldighets kyrka, October 2013

Its location, being at a crossing of the Gävle River on the road from the south of Sweden to the north of Sweden made it an important stop on and north-south journeys.

== Sörby rune stone ==
The Sörby runestone is the oldest object in the church. It is a Christian rune stone from the Södertull area of Gävle that was carved by renowned carver Åsmund Kåresson in the middle of the 11th century. The runestone is dedicated to a chieftain named Egil who died on a war march to Finland.

== Renovations ==
As of March 2025, the church is undergoing extensive renovations, expected to take two years and cost at least 50 million SEK.
