= 60th Guldbagge Awards =

2025 Swedish film awards

- Date: 13 January 2025
- Site: Cirkus, Stockholm, Sweden
- Hosted by: Shima Niavarani

Highlights
- Best Picture: Crossing
- Most awards: Crossing and The Swedish Torpedo (4)
- Most nominations: The Hypnosis and The Swedish Torpedo (8)

Television coverage
- Network: SVT

The 60th Guldbagge Awards ceremony, presented by the Swedish Film Institute, honoring the best Swedish films of 2024, took place on 13 January 2025 at Cirkus in Stockholm. The ceremony broadcast live on SVT1 and was hosted by actress Shima Niavarani. The discontinued special award Guldbagge Newcomer Award was reintroduced. The requirement that nominated actors must have at least one previous performance was removed this year, allowing first-time actors to be nominated.

Drama films Crossing and The Swedish Torpedo won the most awards with four, with the former was awarded Best Film. Other winners included The Hypnosis with three and The Last Journey with two.

== Winners and nominees ==
The nominations were announced on 17 December 2024 at Filmstaden Sergel in Stockholm, Sweden. Comedy film The Hypnosis and sports drama film The Swedish Torpedo led the nominations with eight, followed by drama film Crossing with seven.

Winners are listed first, highlighted in boldface, and indicated with a double dagger (‡).

**Best Film**: **Crossing – Mathilde Dedye**‡; G-21 Scenes from Gottsunda – Göran Hugo Olsson and Melissa Lindgren; The Hypnosis – Mimmi Spång; The Last Journey – Lars Beckung and Petra Måhl; The Swedish Torpedo – David Herdies, Erik Andersson, and Michael Krotkiewski	**Best Director**: **Levan Akin – Crossing**‡; Loran Batti – G-21 Scenes from Gottsunda; Ernst De Geer – The Hypnosis; Filip Hammar and Fredrik Wikingsson – The Last Journey
**Best Actress in a Leading Role**: **Bianca Kronlöf – Heartbeat as Hanne**‡; Mzia Arabuli – Crossing as Lia; Asta Kamma August – The Hypnosis as Vera; Josefin Neldén – The Swedish Torpedo as Sally Bauer	**Best Actor in a Leading Role**: **Herbert Nordrum – The Hypnosis as André**‡; Filip Berg – Trouble as Conny; Robert Gustafsson – Jönssonligan kommer tillbaka as Charles-Ingvar "Sickan" Jönsson; Pål Sverre Hagen – Let Go as Gustav
**Best Actress in a Supporting Role**: **Eva Melander – Trouble as Helena**‡; Lisa Carlehed – The Swedish Torpedo as Carla; Andrea Edwards – The Hypnosis as Lotta; Liv Mjönes – Heartbeat as Katrin	**Best Actor in a Supporting Role**: **David Fukamachi Regnfors – The Hypnosis as Julian**‡; Jonas Karlsson – Jönssonligan kommer tillbaka as Vanheden; Magnus Krepper – Hunters as Greger; Oscar Skagerberg – From Darkness as Viktor
**Best Screenplay**: **The Hypnosis – Ernst De Geer and Mads Stegger**‡; Crossing – Levan Akin; The Last Journey – Filip Hammar and Fredrik Wikingsson; The Swedish Torpedo – Frida Kempff and Marietta von Hausswolff von Baumgarten	**Best Cinematography**: **Crossing – Lisabi Fridell**‡; From Darkness – Nils Eilif Bremdal-Vinell; Summer Times – Johan Palm
**Best Editing**: **Avicii – I'm Tim – Orvar Anklew and Kalle Lindberg**‡; The Hypnosis – Robert Krantz; Israel Palestine on Swedish TV 1958-1989 – Britta Norell	**Best Costume Design**: **The Swedish Torpedo – Eugen Tamberg**‡; Love Will Save Us – Sandra Haraldsen; Nova & Alice – My Ek
**Best Sound Design**: **Crossing – Anne Gry Friis Kristensen and Sigrid DPA Jensen**‡; Heartbeat – Calle Buddee Roos; Love Will Save Us – Mathias Schlegel	**Best Makeup and Hair**: **The Swedish Torpedo – Kaire Hendrikson**‡; Jönssonligan kommer tillbaka – Therese Sandersson; Love Will Save Us – Sandra Haraldsen
**Best Original Score**: **JerryMaya's Detective Agency: The Lost Mascot – Lisa Montan**‡; From Darkness – Erik K. Skodvin; Hunters – Ola Fløttum	**Best Production Design**: **The Swedish Torpedo – Elle Furudahl**‡; Crossing – Roger Rosenberg; Love Will Save Us – Helga Bumsch
**Best Visual Effects**: **The Swedish Torpedo – Sami Haartemo, Mikko Löppönen, Teemu Pitkänen, Ville Pätsi and Jacob Danell**‡; Stockholm Bloodbath – Fredrik Nord and Jacob Gåfvels; XXL – Simon Öster, Kevin Gullberg, Carl Lohman, and Jacob Danell	**Best Documentary Feature**: **The Last Journey – Filip Hammar and Fredrik Wikingsson**‡; G-21 Scenes from Gottsunda – Loran Batti; Israel Palestine on Swedish TV 1958-1989 – Göran Hugo Olsson; The Road to Nowhere – Johan Palmgren
**Best Short Film**: **The Building and Burning of a Refugee Camp – Dennis Harvey**‡; Deck 5B – Malin Ingrid Johansson; On Hospitality – Layla al Attar and Hotel al Rasheed – Magnus Bärtås and Behzad Khosravi Noori; Stuck – Wasima Ayad	**Audience Award** **The Last Journey – Filip Hammar and Fredrik Wikingsson**‡
**Newcomer Award** **Loran Batti – G-21 Scenes from Gottsunda**	**Gullspiran** **Johanna Bergenstråhle**
**Honorary Award** **Lasse Hallström**

=== Films with multiple nominations and awards ===
Films with multiple nominations
Nominations	Film
8	The Hypnosis
8	The Swedish Torpedo
7	Crossing
4	The Last Journey
4	Love Will Save Us
3	From Darkness
3	G - 21 Scenes from Gottsunda
3	Heartbeat
3	Jönssonligan kommer tillbaka
3	Trouble
2	Hunters
2	Israel Palestine on Swedish TV 1958-1989
2	Let Go

Films with multiple wins
Awards	Film
4	Crossing
4	The Swedish Torpedo
3	The Hypnosis
2	The Last Journey
