= Alba August =

Danish-Swedish actress (born 1993)

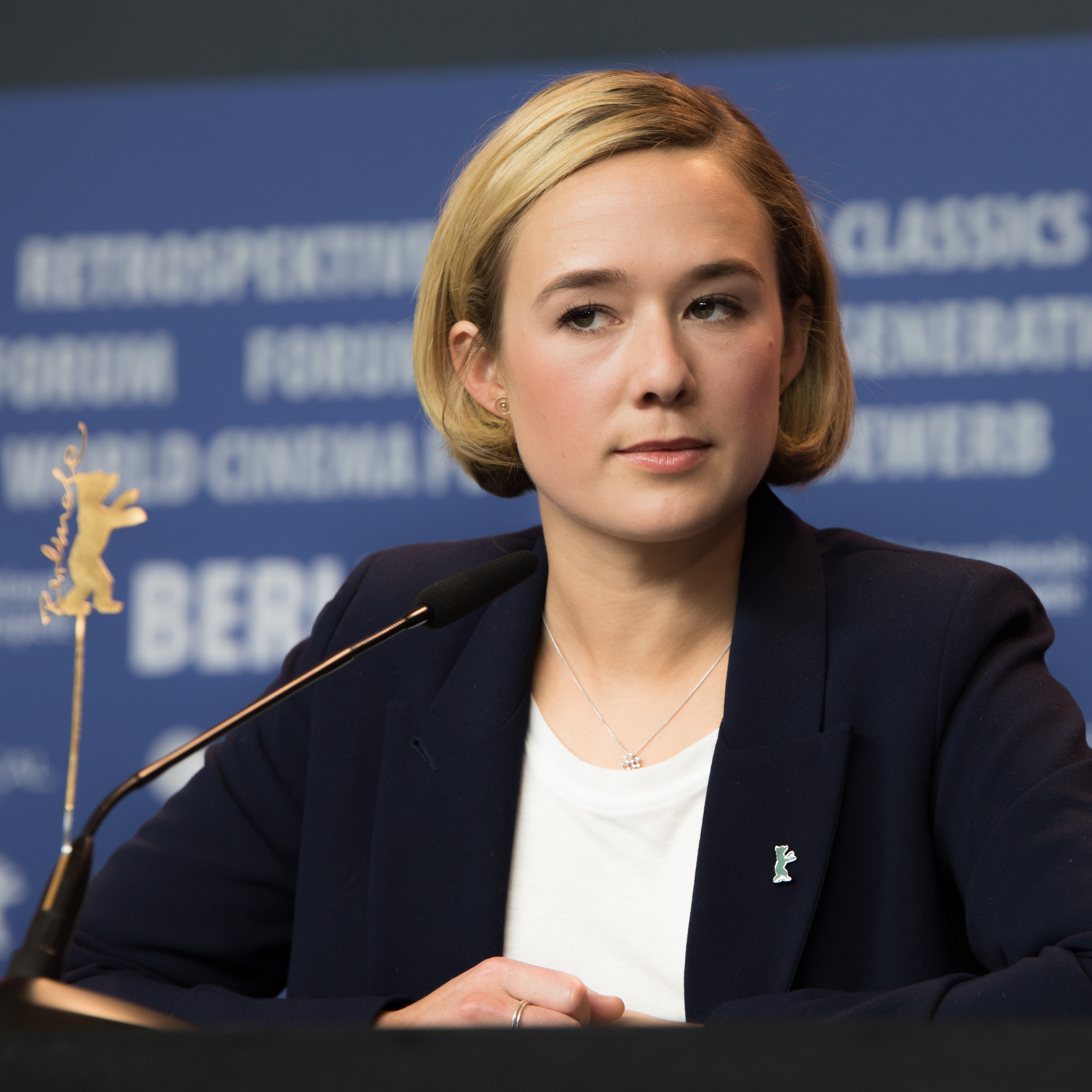
- August at the 68th Berlin Film Festival in February 2018
- Born: Alba Adèle August; 6 June 1993 (age 33); Copenhagen, Denmark
- Citizenship: Denmark; Sweden
- Occupations: Actress; singer
- Years active: 2001–present
- Partner: Pontus Winnberg
- Children: 1
- Parents: Bille August (father); Pernilla August (mother)
- Relatives: Asta Kamma August (sister); Anders August (paternal half-brother); Amaryllis August (paternal half-sister)

Alba Adèle August (born 6 June 1993) is a Danish-Swedish actress and singer. The daughter of Danish director Bille August and Swedish actress-director Pernilla August, she is known for playing a young Astrid Lindgren in the biographical drama film Becoming Astrid (2018). She also starred in the post-apocalyptic Netflix series The Rain (2018–2020) and The Nanny in Knutby (2021–2025).

== Early life and education ==
Alba Adèle August was born 6 June 1993 in Copenhagen, Denmark. She is the daughter of Danish director Bille August and Swedish actress and director Pernilla August, who divorced in 1997. August was raised in Sweden.

Her older sister, Asta Kamma August, is also an actress. On her father's side, she has two older half-brothers, Adam August and Anders August, who are both screenwriters, and a younger half-sister, actress Amaryllis August.

She graduated from the National School of Performing Arts in Copenhagen in 2018.

== Career ==
=== Acting ===
August debuted as a child actor in her father's film A Song for Martin (2001). She had roles in IRL (2013) and the third season of the Sandhamn Murders (2013).

In 2017, August was cast in the first Danish-language original Netflix series, The Rain. For her performance, she was nominated for a Robert Award.

Her first major film role was in Becoming Astrid (2018), a biographical drama which focused on the early life of Astrid Lindgren, then known as Astrid Ericsson. Her performance was positively received.

She played The Nanny in Knutby (2021–2025). For the first season, she was nominated in for Actress of the Year at the 2022 Kristallen TV Awards, alongside Aliette Opheim as Christ's Bride in the same series.

August and Sophie Cookson played fictional sisters seeking revenge in Stockholm Bloodbath, a 2024 film based on the 1520 historical event of the same name. She played a supporting role alongside her mother and older sister in Blackwater (2023), a crime drama series.

=== Music ===
On 30 July 2020, August released her first single "We're Not Gonna Make It". It was featured in the soundtrack of The Rain's final season. On 12 November 2021, August released her debut album I Still Hide, which entered the top 10 on Apple Music's Swedish album chart. She performed the album's first single, "Lights", at the 56th Guldbagge Awards.

In 2024, she was a contestant on season 15 of Så mycket bättre, a Swedish reality show where musicians cover each other's songs. Her interpretation of Noice's "You Only Live Once" received the fifth most Spotify streams of the covers for that year.

== Personal life ==
She speaks Swedish and Danish fluently. She also speaks English.

Her boyfriend is music producer Pontus Winnberg. In 2024, she gave birth to their first child, a daughter.

== Filmography ==
=== Film ===
Year	Title	Role	Notes
2001	A Song for Martin	Girl (uncredited)	Plays flute
2010	Beyond	Voice over (voice)	
2012	Födelsedagsfesten	Actor	Short
2013	Förtroligheten (Eng. Reliance)	Selinda	Leading role
2013	IRL	Agnes	
2014	Vi måste prata (Eng. We Have to Talk)	Waitress	Short
2014	Sometimes I Wish	Girl	Video short
2015	Dryads - Girls Don't Cry	Kjersti	
2016	The Nation	Jonna	Short
2016	A Serious Game	Alma (uncredited)	
2016	Fanny	Fanny	Short
2018	Scener ur natten (Eng. Scenes from the Night)	Sara	Short
2018	Uro	Elise	Short
2018	Becoming Astrid	Astrid Ericsson	Leading role
2019	The Perfect Patient	Jenny Küttim	
2020	The Rain: The End of an Era	Simone	Documentary short
2020	Orca	Hanna	
2021	Tusind Timer	Laura	
2024	Stockholm Bloodbath	Freja Eriksson	

=== Television ===
Year	Title	Role	Notes¨
2013	Morden i Sandhamn	Lina Rosén	Season 3
2014	The Legacy	Lena	Episode: "1.2"
2015	Jordskott	Lina	Episodes: "Del I", "Del II", "Del VII"
2015	Mens vi presser citronen	Lisalotta	Episode: "September: Vi rummer hinanden"
2017	Below the Surface	Marie Bendix	
2018–2020	The Rain	Simone Andersen	Leading role
2021	Alla utom vi	Hilma	Leading role
2021	Knutby	Anna	Leading role
2022	Dygn		
2023	Blackwater	Mia Raft (1991)	Leading role

== Discography ==
=== Albums ===
Title	Album details	Peak chart positions
Title	Album details	SWE
I Still Hide	Released: 12 November 2021; Label: Helga Film AB, Universal Music AB; Format: Digital download, streaming, LP	22

=== Extended plays ===
Title	EP details
Overflow	Released: 28 May 2021; Label: Helga Film AB, Universal Music AB; Format: Digital download, streaming

=== Singles ===
Title	Year	Peak chart positions	Album
Title	Year	SWE	Album
"We're Not Gonna Make It"	2020	—	Non-album single
"Lights"	2021	—	I Still Hide
"Killing Time"	2021	—	I Still Hide
"Quitter"	2021	—	I Still Hide
"Honey"	2021	—	I Still Hide
"Gul & blå" (with Simon Superti)	2026	91	Non-album single

=== Other charted songs ===
Title	Year	Peak chart positions	Album
Title	Year	SWE Heat.	Album
"So Alive"	2021	13	I Still Hide
