= Svinalängorna =

Svinalängorna may refer to:

- Svinalängorna (novel), a 2006 novel by Susanna Alakoski
- Beyond (2010 film) (Swedish: Svinalängorna), film adaption of the novel
