= Asta Kamma August =

Swedish-Danish actress (born 1991)

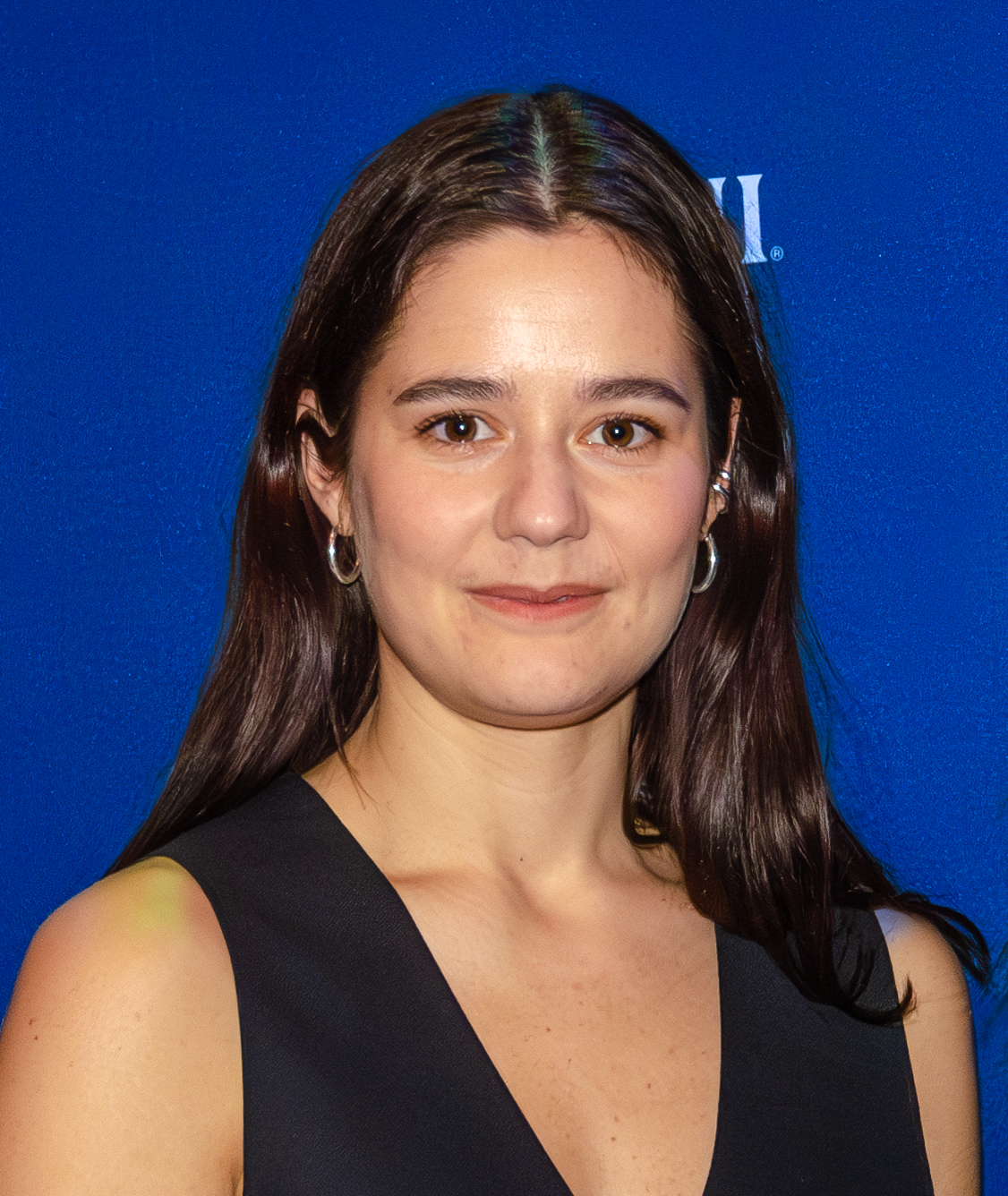
- August in 2023
- Born: Asta Kamma August; 5 November 1991 (age 34); Danderyd, Sweden
- Occupation: Actress
- Years active: 2000–present
- Parents: Bille August (father); Pernilla August (mother)
- Relatives: Alba August (sister); Anders August (paternal half-brother); Amaryllis August (paternal half-sister)

Asta Kamma August (born 5 November 1991) is a Swedish-Danish actress. She starred in The Hypnosis (2023), which earned her a nomination for Guldbagge Award for Best Actress in a Leading Role.

== Early life ==
Asta Kamma August was born in Danderyd, Sweden, on 5 November 1991. She is the daughter of Danish director Bille August and Swedish actress Pernilla August. She is the sister of actress Alba August and seven other half-siblings, including screenwriter Anders August. August grew up mainly in Österlen and Stockholm.

== Career ==
August made her acting debut in a small role in Erik Wedersøe's feature film Anna in 2000, followed by a role in her mother Pernilla August's short film Time-Bomb. She graduated from the Danish National School of Performing Arts in 2017. She played the role of Ophelia in the Hamlet production at the Vendsyssel Theater, Hjørring, Denmark. She was awarded Lauritzen Fondens Believe in You at the 2018 Lauritzen Award. She also was honored with Reumert Talent Award. In 2019, she was nominated for a Robert Award for Best Actress in a Supporting Television Role for starring in TV 2 Charlie's The New Nurses.

In 2021, she starred in her father Bille August's drama film The Pact. In 2023, she starred in SVT's drama series Blackwater. She starred in the leading role of comedy drama film The Hypnosis, which earned her a nomination for Guldbagge Award for Best Actress in a Leading Role. In 2024, August was named as one of the Shooting Stars Award by European Film Promotion. She starred in 2024 miniseries Families like Ours, directed by Thomas Vinterberg, and in which she appeared on-screen alongside her half-sister Amaryllis August.

In 2025, she received Robert and Bodil Awards nominations for her performance in Kalak.

== Acting credits ==
=== Film ===
Year	Title	Role	Notes
2000	Anna	Minna Terlow	
2001	A Song for Martin		
2005	Time-Bomb	Emma	Short film
2010	Pretend	Hon	Short film
2012	I Love Marcus	Linda	Short film
2018	Scenes from the Night	Katarina	Short film
2021	Catcave Hysteria	Hanna	Short film
2021	The Pact	Benedicte	
2022	Burn All My Letters	Karin Stolpe	
2023	The Hypnosis	Vera	
2023	Kalak	‌Lærke	
2024	Over sundet		Short film
2026	What Lies Between Us	Ulrikke	
2026	Growth of the Soil	Inger	

=== Television ===
Year	Title	Role	Network	Notes
2014	The Legacy	Malin	DR	
2018	The New Nurses	Susanne	TV 2 Charlie	
2019	Follow the Money	Sasha	DR	
2020	Sex	Cathrine	TV 2	
2022	The Kingdom: Exodus	Medical student	Viaplay	
2023	Blackwater	Annie	SVT	
2024	Families like Ours	Christel	TV 2	

=== Theatre ===
Year	Title	Role	Venue
2011	The Coming Insurrection	L2	Turteatern, Stockholm
2011	Juliette	Fatime	Turteatern, Stockholm
2012	Politiska snuskbarn och deras djur	Helig	Turteatern, Stockholm
2012	Ladyfest tribute	Valerie	Potato Potato, Stockholm
2015	Mens – The Musical	Various	Royal Dramatic Theatre, Stockholm
2016	I udkanten	Sarah	Teater O, Aarhus
2016	Det rene rum	Mary	Aarhus Theatre, Aarhus
2017	Hamlet	Ophelia	Vendsyssel Theater, Hjørring
2018	My Heartache Brings all the Boys to the Yard	Asta	Aarhus Theatre, Aarhus
2018	Emil i Lönneberga	Ida	Folketeatret, Copenhagen
2019	A Christmas Carol	Julens Ånd	Nørrebros Theater, Copenhagen
2019	Orestien	Elektra	Aarhus Theatre, Aarhus
2020	Little Eyolf	‌Frk Asta Allmers	Husets Teater, Copenhagen
2023	Elektra	Elektra	Husets Teater, Copenhagen
2023	Den fule	Fanny	Uppsala City Theater, Uppsala

== Awards and nominations ==
Award ceremony	Year	Category	Nominee / Work	Result	Ref.
Bodil Awards	2022	Best Actress in a Supporting Role	The Pact	Nominated	
Bodil Awards	2025	Best Supporting Performance	Kalak	Nominated	
Guldbagge Awards	2024	Best Actress in a Leading Role	The Hypnosis	Nominated	
Kristallen	2023	Best Actress	Blackwater	Nominated	
Lauritzen Award	2018	Lauritzen Fondens Believe in You	Herself	Honoree	
Reumert Award	2018	Reumert Talent Award	Herself	Honoree	
Robert Awards	2019	Best Actress in a Supporting Television Role	The New Nurses	Nominated	
Robert Awards	2021	Best Actress in a Leading Television Role	Sex	Nominated	
Robert Awards	2022	Best Actress in a Supporting Role	The Pact	Nominated	
Robert Awards	2025	Best Actress in a Supporting Role	Kalak	Nominated	
Rome Film Festival	2023	Ugo Tognazzi Prize for Best Comedy	The Hypnosis (Note: Shared with Herbert Nordrum.)	Special Mention	
Shooting Stars Award	2024	Shooting Stars Award	Herself	Honoree	
