= Tehilla Blad =

Swedish actress, singer, swimmer and ballet dancer

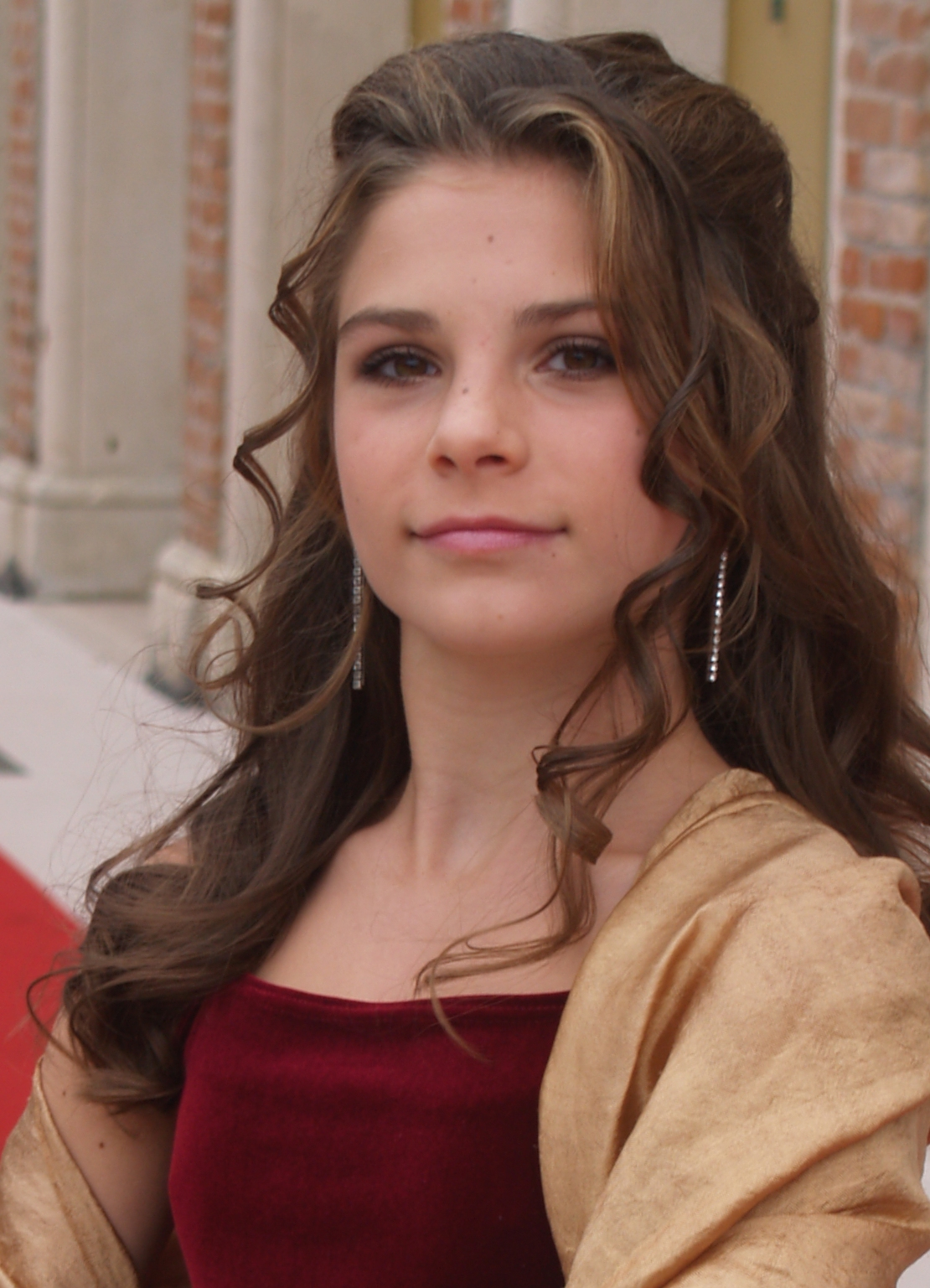
- Blad in 2010
- Born: 5 September 1995 (age 31); Uppsala, Sweden
- Occupations: Actor; singer
- Years active: 2005–present

Tehilla Blad (born 5 September 1995) is a Swedish actress and singer best known for playing the young Lisbeth Salander in the Swedish Millennium films.

== Early life and education ==
Blad was born in Uppsala as the sixth child in a family with eight children who all are focusing on music, dance, swimming and acting. In year 2008 the sibling group, who calls themselves BBx8 (B-B times eight), came to the semi-finals in Talang 2008, the Swedish version of Got Talent. Blad graduated from the Royal Swedish Ballet School in Stockholm in June 2015.

== Career ==
In 2005, Blad participated in the TV miniseries Kvalster (Mites) which went into four episodes on Swedish Television (SVT). She has since then appeared in both children and adult films/TV shows, in particular, Ella in two places (SVT), Dra mig baklänges! (SVT), The Girl with the Dragon Tattoo, The Girl Who Played with Fire and The Girl Who Kicked the Hornets' Nest.

In 2010, she appeared in Pernilla August's film Beyond. Blad and Noomi Rapace played the child and adult versions, respectively, of the main character Leena. Blad and Rapace were both praised for their performances by Helena Lindblad in Dagens Nyheter, and both were nominated for Guldbagge Awards. The film was screened at Venice Film Festival, where it won the Critic's Week Audience Award. The premiere in Sweden was 10 December 2010.

She played Agnes in Riding in Darkness, a 2022 drama series based on the true story of a horse farm owner and riding instructor who was convicted of sexual crimes against his female employees between the ages of 14 and 17. Writing for Svenska Dagbladet, Karoline Eriksson wrote that Blad "[shone] brightly" in the role.

== Filmography ==
Year	Title	Role	Notes
2005	Kvalster	Isabelle	4 episodes
2006	Dra mig baklänges!	Past time child	TV series
2009	The Girl with the Dragon Tattoo	Young Lisbeth Salander	
2009	The Girl Who Played with Fire	Young Lisbeth Salander	
2009	The Girl Who Kicked the Hornets' Nest	Young Lisbeth Salander	
2010	Beyond	Young Leena	
2013	Victoria	Anna	
2014	Øyevitne	Zana	4 episodes
2022	Riding in Darkness	Agnes Lund	TV series
2023	Maria Wern – Vinna eller försvinna	Iris	TV series
2023	Maria Wern – Jacqueline	Iris	TV series
2023	Maria Wern – Plats 89	Iris	TV series
2023	Maria Wern – Ett tidigare liv	Iris	TV series

== Awards ==
Year	Award	Category	Work	Result
2011	Guldbagge Awards	Best Supporting Actress	Beyond	Nominated
