= Herbert Nordrum =

Norwegian actor

- Born: 30 June 1987 (age 39); Oslo, Norway
- Education: Norwegian Academy of Theatre and Performing Arts
- Occupation: Actor
- Years active: 2012-present

Herbert Nordrum (born 30 June 1987) is a Norwegian stage, film and television actor. His film roles include The Worst Person in the World (2021) and The Hypnosis (2023), which earned him the Guldbagge Award for Best Actor in a Leading Role.

== Biography ==
From Oslo, Nordrum studied at the Norwegian Academy of Theatre and Performing Arts, between 2008 and 2011. He had early stage performances at the Trøndelag Teater in plays Christmas in Prussia and The Jubilee in 2012.

For his performances on screen, Nordrum won the Kanon Award and Amanda Award in 2014 in the Best Supporting Actor categories for his role as playboy Karl in Norwegian film Pornopung (2013), directed by Johan Kaos. He had the lead role in the 2018 comedy television series Match. He appeared as Poppe in the 2020 film Fjols til Fjells, receiving an Amanda Award nomination for Best Actor in 2020.

Nordrum had a starring role as Eivind in Joachim Trier film The Worst Person in the World, which premiered at the 2021 Cannes Film Festival. He received an Amanda Award nomination the following year for Best Supporting Actor. For his performance as Andre in the film The Hypnosis (2023), he won Best Actor in a Leading Role at the 60th Guldbagge Awards. That year, he could be seen as Torsten in psychological thriller The Royal Hotel.

In 2025, he joined the cast of comedy film Everybody Wants to Fuck Me. That year, Nordrum was also cast as Colonel Brandon in the Jane Austen period-drama adaptation Sense and Sensibility.

== Personal life ==
Nordrum has an English grandfather.

== Partial filmography ==
Key
†	Denotes works that have not yet been released

Year	Title	Role	Notes
2013	Pornopung	Karl	
2018	Match	Stian	20 episodes
2020	Fjols til Fjells	Poppe	
2021	The Worst Person in the World	Eivind	Film
2023	The Hypnosis	Andre	Film
2023	The Royal Hotel	Torsten	Film
2026	Sense and Sensibility	Colonel Brandon	Film
2026	Growth of the Soil	Isak	Film
TBA	Everybody Wants to Fuck Me†	TBA	Film
