= Anders August =

Danish screenwriter

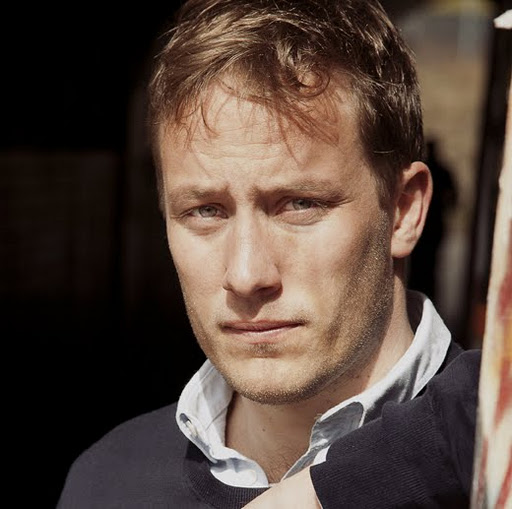
- Screenwriter Anders August at Toronto International Film Festival.
- Born: Anders Frithiof August; 15 June 1978 (age 48); Copenhagen, Denmark
- Occupation: Screenwriter
- Parent: Bille August (father)
- Relatives: Asta Kamma August (paternal half-sister); Alba August (paternal half-sister); Amaryllis August (paternal half-sister)
- Writing career
- Genre: Film
- Notable works: The Pig; Applause; SuperClásico; A Funny Man

Anders Frithiof August (born 15 June 1978 in Copenhagen) is a Danish screenwriter for film and television.

== Career ==
After graduating from the National Film School of Denmark in 2007, August wrote the short film Grisen (The Pig). It was nominated for an Oscar in 2009. In 2011 he won the Danish film- and television industry's biggest award, The Nordisk Film Award.

He has written several episodes of Danish prime-time television as well as feature films, most notably Applause, which won numerous awards for main actress Paprika Steen in 2010, and the comedy SuperClásico, short-listed for an Oscar in 2012.

His biopic A Funny Man (2011) was the biggest local box-office hit in Denmark the year it was released. Both it and SuperClásico earned him nominations for a Danish Academy Award, the Robert Award as best screenwriter. (The award went to Lars Von Trier for Melancholia).

August has since written a number of episodes of Danish drama The Legacy. He also co-created a series a financial crime series called Follow the Money for the same network, DR. It premiered at the 2015 Berlinale. In 2015, BBC America / AMC announced they were developing a show created by August.

He wrote the screenplay for the film Ehrengard: The Art of Seduction (2023), which was directed by his father, Bille August. It was adapted from Isak Dinesen's novel Ehrengard.

== Family ==
He is the son of Danish film and television director Bille August and his first wife Annie Munksgård Lauritzen.

His father divorced Annie and remarried twice more. During his teen years (13–19), his stepmother was actress Pernilla August, his father's third wife. She appeared in Star Wars.

August's younger half-sister on his father's side is Danish-Swedish actress and singer-songwriter Alba August.
