= Families like Ours =

2024 Danish television miniseries

- Canal+ poster
- Danish: Familier som vores
- Written by: Thomas Vinterberg; Bo Hr. Hansen
- Directed by: Thomas Vinterberg
- Starring: Amaryllis August; Albert Rudbeck Lindhardt; Nikolaj Lie Kaas; Paprika Steen; Helene Reingaard Neumann; Esben Smed; Magnus Millang
- Composer: Valentin Hadjadj
- Countries of origin: Denmark; France; Sweden; Czech Republic; Belgium; Norway; Germany
- Original languages: Danish; English; French; Polish; Russian; Romanian
- No. of episodes: 7

Production
- Executive producers: Anna Marsh; Ron Halpern; Jennifer Green; Katrine Vogelsang; Olivier Bibas; Morgane Perrolier; Louise Gigon; Elisabeth Tangen; Johanna Lind; Claudia Grässel; Sebastian Lückel; Christoph Pellander
- Producers: Sisse Graum Jørgensen; Kasper Dissing
- Cinematography: Sturla Brandth Grøvlen
- Editors: Anne Østerud; Janus Billeskov Jansen
- Running time: 49–50 minutes
- Production companies: StudioCanal; Canal+; TV 2; Film i Väst; Sirena Film; Zentropa Sweden; Ginger Pictures; Zentropa Entertainments; Saga Film

Original release
- Network: TV 2
- Release: 20 October – 1 December 2024

Families like Ours (Danish: Familier som vores) is a 2024 drama television miniseries co-written and directed by Thomas Vinterberg. It premiered at the 81st Venice International Film Festival on 31 August 2024 and began airing on TV 2 on 20 October 2024.

== Premise ==
Due to rising sea levels, Laura and her family must navigate a nationwide evacuation of their native Denmark.

== Cast and characters ==
- Amaryllis August as Laura
- Albert Rudbeck Lindhardt as Elías
- Nikolaj Lie Kaas as Jacob, Laura's father, an architect
- Paprika Steen as Fanny, Laura's mother, a journalist
- Helene Reingaard Neumann as Amalie, Laura's stepmother
- Esben Smed as Nikolaj, Amalie's brother and Laura's uncle
- Magnus Millang as Henrik, Nikolaj's husband
- Thomas Bo Larsen as Holger, Fanny's brother and Laura's uncle
- David Dencik as Peter, Henrik's brother
- Max Kaysen Høyrup as Lucas
- Asta Kamma August as Christel, Lucas's mother

== Episodes ==
No.	Title	Duration	Original release date
1	"The Hour Draws Near" (Sig nærmer tiden)	49 min	20 October 2024
2	"Separating the Wheat from the Chaff" (Fårene skilles fra bukkene)	50 min	27 October 2024
3	"The Angel's Watch" (Stå, engle, på vagt)	50 min	3 November 2024
4	"Farewell" (Farvel, Danmark)	50 min	10 November 2024
5	"Beyond all Boundaries" (Over alle grænser)	50 min	17 November 2024
6	"A Time to Get and a Time to Lose" (Alt, hvad der sker under himlen)	50 min	24 November 2024
7	"I Make All Things New" (Jeg gør alting nyt)	50 min	1 December 2024

== Production ==
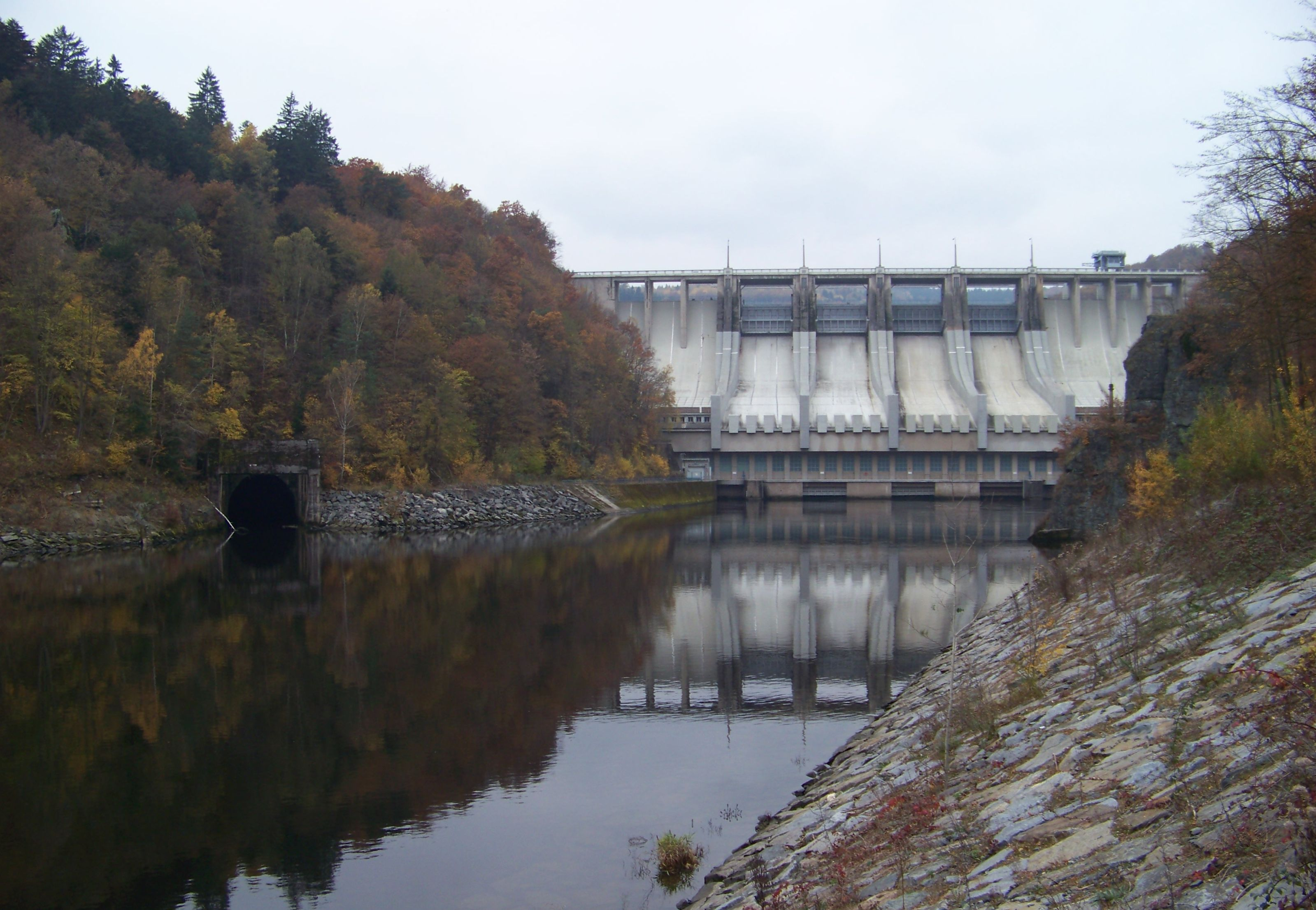
The Slapy Reservoir in the Czech Republic was used as a filming location.

Thomas Vinterberg conceived the idea for the series in 2017 while working abroad in Paris. He took inspiration from the 2015 film Brooklyn when writing the series, and further stated:

I was less interested in the politics of it. I wasn’t interested in making sort of a 'climate-warning' series. It's going to be called that in places, I'm sure, but I'm hoping not too often, because this is more about human resilience, about how humans can create coping strategies when there's a crisis and when they're being separated from what they love.

— Thomas Vinterberg

Because he wrote the series before the COVID-19 pandemic, Vinterberg and co-writer Bo Hr. Hansen made some changes to the script so as not to mirror the pandemic too closely. The series originally took place in Kyiv before it was changed.

The series was announced in August 2020 and the cast was announced in October 2022. Filming took place in Denmark, Sweden, the Czech Republic, Romania, and France over the course of a year. The production employed over 40 actors and 2,500 extras.

== Release ==
=== Festivals ===
Promotional stills from the series were released on 4 December 2023. A teaser trailer for the series was released on 28 August 2024. The series premiered at the 81st Venice International Film Festival on 31 August 2024. Because of Venice's own flooding concerns, Vinterberg stated, "Even in my first letter to Alberto [Barbera], I said there was no other place we can show this than in Venice." The series received a four-minute standing ovation at the festival.

The first two episodes also screened at the 2024 BFI London Film Festival on 11 and 14 October 2024.

=== Danish release ===
The series began airing in Denmark on TV 2 on 20 October 2024.

=== International release ===
It was released for streaming in Canada on CBC Gem on 22 November 2024.

In March 2025, the series was acquired by the BBC for the United Kingdom. In June 2025, it was acquired by Netflix for the United States, and in the same month started airing on public television channel SBS Television's streaming service, SBS on Demand, in Australia.

== Reception ==
Most reviews were positive, with a score of 93% on review aggregator Rotten Tomatoes based on 15 reviews as of January 2026. Metacritic's score is 72%, based on four reviews.

After its screening in Venice, Stephanie Bunbury of Deadline called the series "grimly prophetic" and wrote that it "tackles [a] subject that is perhaps too huge for the confines of a TV drama". Jan Lumholdt of Cineuropa commended Vinterberg's direction and the cast's performances.

Niels Jakob Kyhl Jørgensen of Filmmagasinet Ekko gave the series five out of six stars, writing, "Families Like Ours is both a tribute and a loving eulogy to the Danes — and the most riveting social story in years." Jacob Ludvigsen of Soundvenue gave the series three out of six stars, writing that the series' "brilliant premise drowns in Thomas Vinterberg's wildly ambitious TV 2 series".

Serena Seghedoni of Loud and Clear Reviews gave the series five stars and wrote, "Families Like Ours (Familier Som Vores)'s brilliant premise is exactly what it takes for Europe to understand the refugee crisis, in a marvel of a series that brims with humanity and puts its characters first." She also called it "the kind of series you don’t want to end".

However, Lucy Mangan, writing in The Guardian after its release on BBC Four and iPlayer, gave it only three out of five stars, saying "there is much to admire... But it all feels a bit thin, a bit bloodless – like a thought experiment made flesh rather than a compelling, provocative drama", and criticised the script.

Mike Hale, writing in The New York Times after the series' release on Netflix, criticised some of the obvious contrivances in the early episode, and found it a bit like a "high-grade melodrama". However, he wrote that the writing, direction, and performances "are sufficiently understated that the drama works on you, and by the last episodes the physical and psychological travails of the fleeing Danes have real force". Time magazine listed the series as one of the five best shows of June 2025.

After its release on SBS Television in Australia, Bridget McManus gave it four out of five stars in The Age and The Sydney Morning Herald, calling the series "an absorbing pre-apocalyptic study in how an impending national crisis affects people on a macro level".
