= Becoming Astrid =

2018 Danish–Swedish film directed by Pernille Fischer Christensen

- Theatrical release poster
- Swedish: Unga Astrid
- Directed by: Pernille Fischer Christensen
- Screenplay by: Pernille Fischer Christensen; Kim Fupz Aakeson
- Produced by: Lars G. Lindström; Anna Anthony; Maria Dahlin
- Starring: Alba August; Maria Bonnevie; Magnus Krepper; Trine Dyrholm; Henrik Rafaelsen; Björn Gustafsson; Maria Fahl Vikander
- Cinematography: Erik Molberg Hansen
- Edited by: Kasper Leick; Åsa Mossberg
- Music by: Nicklas Schmidt
- Production companies: Nordisk Film; Avanti Film; DCM Productions; Danish Film Institute; Film i Väst; Nordisk Film Production
- Distributed by: Nordisk Film (Sweden); DCM Film Distribution (Germany)
- Release date: 14 September 2018 (Sweden)
- Running time: 123 minutes
- Countries: Sweden; Denmark
- Languages: Swedish; Danish
- Budget: €5 million
- Box office: $885,740

Becoming Astrid (Swedish: Unga Astrid, Danish: Unge Astrid) is a 2018 biographical drama film about the early life of Swedish author Astrid Lindgren. An international co-production between Sweden and Denmark, the film is directed by Pernille Fischer Christensen, from a screenplay co-written by Christensen and Kim Fupz Aakeson, and stars Alba August and Maria Fahl Vikander as young and elder incarnations of Lindgren, alongside Maria Bonnevie, Magnus Krepper, Trine Dyrholm, Henrik Rafaelsen and Björn Gustafsson.

The film premiered at the 68th Berlin International Film Festival on 21 February 2018, and was theatrically released in Sweden on 14 September of the same year, as well as in Denmark on 31 January 2019.

== Plot ==
Children from all over the world write letters to Astrid Lindgren (Maria Fahl Vikander), which makes her dream back to her youth in Småland. When she (Alba August) worked at Vimmerby tidning, she falls in love with the chief editor, Reinhold Blomberg (Henrik Rafaelsen), who is 30 years her senior. She becomes pregnant with a son, Lars. As an unwed mother, she chooses to give birth to her son in Copenhagen, where she did not have to disclose the father's name.

Her son spent his first years in a Danish foster family. At the Royal Automobile Club, Astrid met Sture Lindgren (Björn Gustafsson), who later came to be her husband.

== Cast ==
- Alba August as Astrid Ericsson
  - Maria Fahl Vikander as Older Astrid
- Maria Bonnevie as Hanna Ericsson, Astrid's mother
- Magnus Krepper as Samuel August Ericsson, Astrid's father
- Henrik Rafaelsen as Reinhold Blomberg, editor-in-chief of Vimmerby magazine, and father of her son Lars
- Trine Dyrholm as Lars' Danish foster mother
- Björn Gustafsson as Sture Lindgren, Astrid's later husband
- Li Brådhe as Landlord
- Mira Mitchell as Berta
- Sofia Karemyr as Madicken

== Production ==
Principal photography took place at Marquardt Palace in Potsdam, Brandenburg, Germany as well as in Västra Götaland in Sweden.

== Release ==
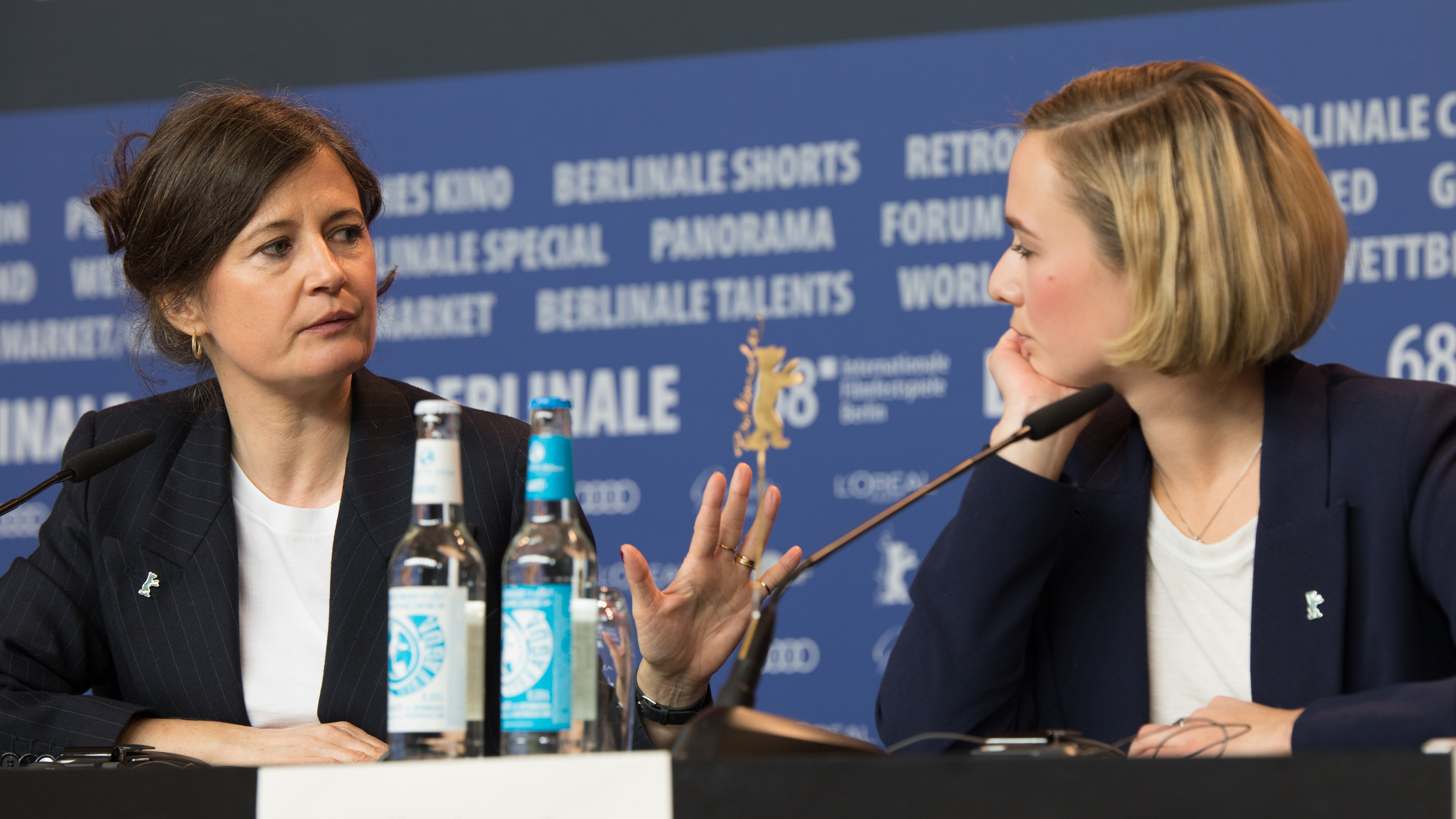
Pernille Fischer Christensen and Alba August at the 2018 Berlin International Film Festival

Following its premiere at the 68th Berlin International Film Festival, Becoming Astrid was screened at the Chicago International Film Festival, where its North American distribution rights were purchased by Music Box Films. The film received a limited theatrical release on 23 November 2018.

=== Critical response ===
The film received critical acclaim. On review aggregator Rotten Tomatoes, it holds an approval rating of 96% based on 28 reviews, with an average rating of 7.1/10. The site's critical consensus reads: "Becoming Astrid pays tribute to a beloved character's creator with a biopic that proves the story behind the scenes is just as timelessly engaging." On Metacritic it has a weighted average score of 71 out of 100, based on 8 critics, indicating "generally favorable reviews".

=== Accolades ===
Award	Date of ceremony	Category	Recipient(s)	Result	Ref(s)
Guldbagge Awards	28 January 2019	Best Film	Lars G Lindström, Maria Dahlin and Anna Anthony (producers)	Nominated	
Guldbagge Awards	28 January 2019	Best Actress	Alba August	Nominated	
Guldbagge Awards	28 January 2019	Best Supporting Actor	Henrik Rafaelsen	Nominated	
Guldbagge Awards	28 January 2019	Best Supporting Actress	Maria Bonnevie	Nominated	
Guldbagge Awards	28 January 2019	Best Costume Design	Cilla Rörby	Nominated	
Guldbagge Awards	28 January 2019	Art Direction	Linda Janson	Nominated	

=== Response from loved ones ===
Karin Nyman, Astrid and Sture's daughter, has criticized the film about her mother, stating that Astrid would have felt enormous reluctance for such a film, and that the period in her life, the relationship with Reinhold Blomberg, the son's birth, and foster home stay, was something private, which she did not want to focus on. Nyman drew comparisons to other biopics, about Winston Churchill (Darkest Hour) or Björn Borg (Borg vs McEnroe), where one focused on what they accomplished in life, rather than a few years of the person's most intimate private life.
