= Ehrengard: The Art of Seduction =

- Danish: Ehrengard: Forførelsens kunst
- Directed by: Bille August
- Written by: Anders August
- Produced by: Marcella Dichmann
- Starring: Mikkel Boe Følsgaard; Sidse Babett Knudsen; Alice Bier Zandén
- Cinematography: Jan Pallesen
- Edited by: Biel Andrés; Janus Billeskov Jansen
- Music by: Annette Focks
- Distributed by: Netflix
- Release date: 14 September 2023
- Running time: 94 minutes
- Country: Denmark
- Language: Danish

Ehrengard: The Art of Seduction (Danish: Ehrengard: Forførelsens kunst) is a 2023 Danish romantic comedy period drama written by Anders August and directed by his father Bille August. It is based on the novel Ehrengard (1963) by Karen Blixen.

== Plot ==
In the fictional kingdom of Babenhausen, the artist Cazotte is hired by the Grand Duchess to help her son, Prince Lothar, marry and produce an heir. The plan backfires when Prince Lothar and Princess Ludmilla conceive a child five months before their wedding. The Prince and Princess go into hiding at Rosenbad, accompanied by Ehrengard, as lady-in-waiting, and Cazotte. While the Grand Duke's cousins, the Marbods, try to discover what is going on, Cazotte attempts to woo Ehrengard. After an unsuccessful attempt by the Marbods to kidnap the baby, Ehrengard protects the Princess and the real truth of the matter by telling the Marbods that she is the mother of the child. In the end, Cazotte reveals his better-known identity as Casanova.

== Cast ==
- Mikkel Boe Følsgaard as Mr. Cazotte
- Sidse Babett Knudsen as the Grand Duchess
- Alice Bier Zandén as Ehrengard
- Emilie Kroyer Koppel as Princess Ludmilla
- Emil Aron Dorph as Prince Lothar
- Jacob Lohmann as Mr. Marbod
- Sara-Marie Maltha as Mrs. Marbod
- Jakob Højlev Jørgensen as Matthias
- Lone Rødbroe as Lisbeth
- Christopher Læssø as Mr. Podolski
- Alban Lendorf as Kurt

== Production ==
Queen Margrethe II of Denmark designed 51 costumes for the film, as well as 81 decoupages that made up the basis for the sets. She is credited as set and costume designer, but was not paid by the production companies for her contributions.

The film project was developed for over a decade by Jacob Jørgensen and JJ Film. Anders August ("The Marco Effect") wrote the screenplay adapted from Ehrengard (1963), a novel by Karen Blixen.

Marcella Dichmann from SF Studios and Netflix were involved in production, with Netflix also serving as distributor. Bille August directed the film.

Concurently with the film, Netflix released a behind-the-scenes documentary about its making called Lifting the Veil: Behind the Scenes of Ehrengard.

== Release ==
The film was released on Netflix on 14 September 2023.
