= The Girl (2009 film) =

- English-language promotional poster
- Swedish: Flickan
- Directed by: Fredrik Edfeldt
- Written by: Karin Arrhenius
- Release date: 2009
- Country: Sweden
- Language: Swedish

The Girl (Swedish: Flickan) is a 2009 drama film from Sweden directed by Fredrik Edfeldt and written by Karin Arrhenius. It tells the story of a little girl (played by Blanca Engström) left alone at her home in 1981, while her parents and brother are on a trip to Sub-Saharan Africa to do charitable work.

The film premiered at the 2009 Berlin International Film Festival. It won the 2010 Guldbagge Award for Best Cinematography.

== Cast ==
- Blanca Engström - The Girl
- Shanti Roney - The Father
- Annika Hallin - The Mother
- Calle Lindqvist - Petter
- Tova Magnusson - Anna
