= Susanna Alakoski =

Swedish writer

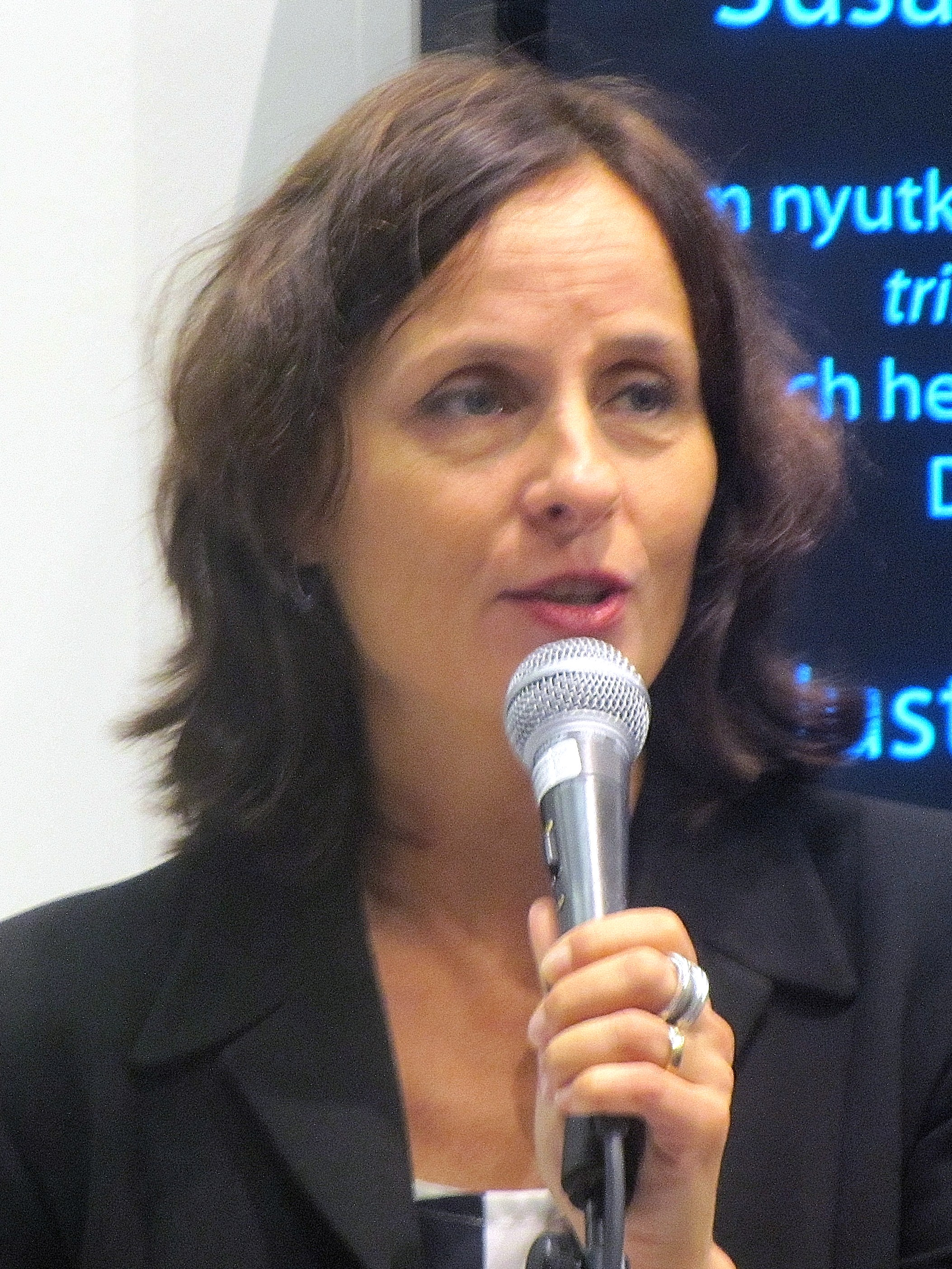
- Born: Jaana Susanna Emilia Alakoski; 16 May 1962 (age 64); Vaasa, Finland
- Occupation: novelist
- Spouse: Mats Söderlund (m. 1990)
- Children: 3
- Writing career
- Period: 2006–present
- Notable work: Svinalängorna
- Website: susannaalakoski.se

Jaana Susanna Emilia Alakoski Söderlund (née Alakoski; born 16 May 1962) is a Swedish author, novelist and lecturer. She won the August Prize in 2006 for the novel Svinalängorna. Svinalängorna was filmed in 2010 as Beyond. She researches gender issues and works as a social worker.

== Biography ==
Born in 1962 in Vaasa, Finland, Alakoski is a Sweden Finn: her parents are Finnish and her mother tongue is Finnish, but she moved to Sweden with her family when she was four years old. She spent her early life in the Fridhem area in Ystad, Sweden. She studied to become a socionom and finished her degree at the age of 23. In 1988, she studied writing at Skurups folkhögskola. Between 1995 and 2003, she worked as a press secretary for the Vänsterpartiet politician Gudrun Schyman.

In 2006, she released her debut novel Svinalängorna. It took the August Prize in 2006. The novel sold over 400,000 copies in Sweden and it has been made into a feature film with the English title of Beyond.

In 2010, she released her second novel, Håpas du trifs bra i fengelset. In 2011, she released her first children's novel, Dagens Harri, which were followed by Guldfisken in 2012 and Dagens skräckis in 2013. She published a diary, Oktober i Fattigsverige in 2012.

She has also been editor for the anthologies Tala om klass, Lyckliga slut, and Fejkad orgasm.

== Personal life ==
She is married to Mats Söderlund since 1990. They have three children. As of 2024, she had moved from Stockholm to Österlen.

== Bibliography – a selection ==
- Svinalängorna (2006)
- Håpas du trifs bra i fengelset (2010)
- Dagens Harri (2011)
- Guldfisken (2012)
- Oktober i Fattigsverige (2012)
- Dagens skräckis (2013)
