= The Hypnosis =

2023 comedy drama film

- Theatrical release poster
- Swedish: Hypnosen
- Directed by: Ernst De Geer
- Screenplay by: Ernst De Geer; Mads Stegger
- Produced by: Mimmi Spång
- Starring: Asta Kamma August; Herbert Nordrum
- Cinematography: Jonathan Bjerstedt
- Edited by: Robert Krantz
- Music by: Peder Kjellsby
- Production company: Garagefilm International
- Release dates: 4 July 2023 (KVIFF); 8 March 2024 (Sweden)
- Running time: 100 minutes
- Countries: Sweden; Norway; France
- Language: Swedish

The Hypnosis (Swedish: Hypnosen) is a 2023 satirical comedy-drama film directed by Ernst De Geer in his directorial debut, from a screenplay he wrote with Mads Stegger. The film stars Asta Kamma August and Herbert Nordrum as a young couple of business partners.

It had its world premiere at the 57th Karlovy Vary International Film Festival on 4 July 2023. It was theatrically released in Sweden on 8 March 2024.

== Premise ==
A young couple, André and Vera, prepares to pitch a business idea of women's reproductive health mobile application. When Vera tries hypnotherapy to quit smoking, she loses her social inhibition.

== Cast ==
- Asta Kamma August as Vera
- Herbert Nordrum as André
- Andrea Edwards as Lotta
- David Fukamachi Regnfors as Julian

== Production ==
In 2020, the project participated at the Les Arcs Film Festival's Co-Production Village. During the event, it piqued the most interest among international sales agents, co-producers, and distributors. In 2021, the project also participated at the Nordic Film Market. International sales agent Totem Films presented the film's first images and trailer at the 2023 Cannes Film Festival market.

== Release ==
The Hypnosis had its world premiere at the 57th Karlovy Vary International Film Festival on 4 July 2023, competing for the Crystal Globe award. In November 2023, I Wonder acquired the film's distribution rights for Italy, Mindjazz for Germany and Austria, and HBO for Eastern Europe. Mubi acquired the film's distribution rights in some regions, releasing it on 16 August 2024. The film was theatrically released in Sweden on 8 March 2024.

== Reception ==
=== Critical reception ===
On the review aggregator website Rotten Tomatoes, 94% of 18 critics' reviews are positive, with an average rating of 6.00/10.

=== Accolades ===
Award / Film Festival	Date of ceremony	Category	Recipient(s)	Result	Ref.
Karlovy Vary International Film Festival	8 July 2023	Crystal Globe	Ernst De Geer	Nominated	
Karlovy Vary International Film Festival	8 July 2023	Best Actor	Herbert Nordrum	Won	
Karlovy Vary International Film Festival	8 July 2023	Europa Cinemas Label Award	Ernst De Geer	Won	
Karlovy Vary International Film Festival	8 July 2023	FIPRESCI Award for Crystal Globe Competition	Ernst De Geer	Won	
Rome Film Fest	29 October 2023	Vittorio Gassman Prize for Best Actor	Herbert Nordrum	Won	
Rome Film Fest	29 October 2023	Ugo Tognazzi Prize for Best Comedy	Asta Kamma August and Herbert Nordrum	Special Mention	
Les Arcs Film Festival	22 December 2023	Les cinglés du cinéma award	Ernst De Geer	Won	
Guldbagge Awards	13 January 2025	Best Film	Mimmi Spång	Nominated	
Guldbagge Awards	13 January 2025	Best Director	Ernst De Geer	Nominated	
Guldbagge Awards	13 January 2025	Best Actress in a Leading Role	Asta Kamma August	Nominated	
Guldbagge Awards	13 January 2025	Best Actor in a Leading Role	Herbert Nordrum	Won	
Guldbagge Awards	13 January 2025	Best Actress in a Supporting Role	Andrea Edwards	Nominated	
Guldbagge Awards	13 January 2025	Best Actor in a Supporting Role	David Fukamachi Regnfors	Won	
Guldbagge Awards	13 January 2025	Best Screenplay	Ernst De Geer and Mads Stegger	Won	
Guldbagge Awards	13 January 2025	Best Editing	Robert Krantz	Nominated	
