= What Lies Between Us =

2026 film by Amalie Næsby Fick

- Danish: Dobbeltfejl
- Directed by: Amalie Næsby Fick
- Written by: Nikolaj Arcel; Sara Isabella Jønsson
- Produced by: Louise Vesth
- Starring: Sidse Babett Knudsen; Sofie Gråbøl; Asta Kamma August
- Production company: Zentropa
- Release date: September 2026 (Toronto)
- Running time: 107 minutes
- Countries: Denmark; Sweden; Netherlands
- Language: Danish

What Lies Between Us (Danish: Dobbeltfejl) is an drama film directed by Amalie Næsby Fick from a screenplay written by Nikolaj Arcel and Sara Isabella Jønsson. It stars Sidse Babett Knudsen, Sofie Gråbøl, and Asta Kamma August. It is an international co-production of Denmark, Sweden, and the Netherlands.

It will have its world premiere in the Discovery section at the 2026 Toronto International Film Festival.

== Premise ==
A mother attempts to shield her son after he is accused of sexually assaulting a teenage boy in a quiet suburban community.

== Cast ==
- Sidse Babett Knudsen as Anne Sofie
- Sofie Gråbøl as Sarah
- Asta Kamma August as Ulrikke

== Production ==
In June 2025, the project received a €190,000 production grant from Eurimages. It also received a 2,600,000 Norwegian krone production grant from Nordisk Film & TV Fond in the same month.

Principal photography began in December 2025 under the production title Good Mothers.

== Release ==
What Lies Between Us is set to have its world premiere in the Discovery section of the 2026 Toronto International Film Festival in September. In May 2025, it was reported that Trust Nordisk had acquired the film's international sales rights.
