= Blackwater (TV series) =

Swedish television series

- Series poster
- Based on: Blackwater by Kerstin Ekman
- Screenplay by: Maren Louise Käehne; Karin Arrhenius
- Directed by: Mikael Marcimain
- Starring: Pernilla August; Alba August; Rolf Lassgård; Magnus Krepper; Alma Pöysti; Asta Kamma August
- Original language: Swedish
- No. of series: 1
- No. of episodes: 6

Production
- Producer: Piv Bernth
- Cinematography: Joe Maples FSF
- Production companies: Apple Tree Productions; ARD Degeto; Filmpool Nord; ITV Studios

Original release
- Network: SVT
- Release: 23 January 2023 – present

Blackwater (Swedish: Händelser vid vatten, lit. 'Events by the water') is a Swedish television drama made for SVT and ITV Studios by Piv Bernth and Apple Tree Productions. It is an adaptation by Maren Louise Käehne and Karin Arrhenius of Kerstin Ekman's 1993 novel of the same name. It is directed by Mikael Marcimain, and stars Pernilla August and Rolf Lassgård. It had its Swedish premiere on 13 January 2023. and was screened in competition at the Göteborg Festival. It was broadcast in France and Germany in March 2023.

== Synopsis ==
The action is set in Blackwater during two time-periods, 1973 and 1991. In the mountains of North Sweden, near the small town of Blackwater, two tourists are found murdered in a tent in 1973. Annie discovers their corpses while making her way to an isolated commune with her young daughter Mia. The local policeman Åke and doctor Birger begin to investigate the crime but are replaced by detectives from Stockholm. Suspects include local residents and commune members. Repercussions of the unsolved murders are still felt 18 years later. Mia returns to Blackwater to visit Annie, who now teaches at the local school. Annie remains haunted by the deaths – endeavouring to find the culprit. Later Annie is found dead, initially believed to be either accidental or suicide.

== Cast ==
Character	Actor (1973)	Actor (1991)
Annie Raft	Asta Kamma August	Pernilla August
Mia Raft	Alva Adermark	Alba August
Birger Torbjörnsson	Sven Boräng	Rolf Lassgård
Dan Ulander	Christian Fandango Sundgren	Andreas Kundler
Johan Brandberg	Liam Gabrielsson Lövbrand	Erik Ehn
Björne Brandberg	Lucas Grimstedt	Jesper Sjölander
Barbro Torbjörnsson	Liv Mjönes	
Petrus	Magnus Krepper	Magnus Krepper
Ylja Happolati	Alma Pöysti	Anitta Suikkari

== Production ==
The series is an adaptation of the 1993 novel Blackwater by Kerstin Ekman. Sveriges Television ordered the production of the series in February 2020 from Apple Tree Productions, with co-production from ARD Degeto in Germany, and Filmpool Nord, and distribution internationally by ITV Studios. It was announced that Maren Louise Käehne was scripting the adaptation and it would be directed by Pernilla August with Marek Wieser as director of photography and Anna Asp on production design.

Käehne had first approached STV about an adaptation in 2017. Ekman approved Käehne's vision for the series, and with Piv Bernth on board as producer, they developed the series to a greenlight with SVT. The COVID-19 pandemic delayed production and prevented Pernilla August from directing the series as had been announced, with Mikael Marcimain taking responsibility and August and her daughters instead playing Annie, young Annie and Annie's daughter Mia.

== Release and reception ==
The series was pre-sold across Scandinavia, with public broadcasters DR in Denmark, NRK in Norway, YLE in Finland, and RUV in Iceland buying rights. The series competed for the 2023 Nordisk Film & TV Fond Prize at the Gothenburg Film Festival in January 2023.

The series was distributed internationally by ITV Studios. It premiered in March 2023 in France and Germany. In Australia, all episodes were streamed on the free public broadcaster SBS on Demand in September 2023. It premiered on Walter Presents on Channel 4 in the UK January 2025, to excellent reviews. Whattowatch.com called it "one of the best Swedish thrillers in years". Nordic Watchlist called it "quirky" and "a slow burn" that wouldn't be to everyone's taste, but well worth the watch.
