= Maren Louise Käehne =

Danish screenwriter (born 1976)

- Maren Louise Käehne at the 2026 Venice Film Festival
- Born: 1976 (age 49–50); Svendborg, Denmark
- Education: Danish Film School (2009)
- Occupation: Screenwriter

Maren Louise Käehne (born 1976) is a Danish screenwriter.

== Biography ==
Käehne was born in Svendborg, Denmark and graduated from the Danish Film School in 2009. She has written various episodes of the acclaimed Danish dramas Borgen and The Bridge and cowrote Shelley (film). With Karin Arrhenius, she adapted Kerstin Ekman's book into the 2023 Swedish crime drama series Blackwater.
