= Amaryllis August =

Danish actress

- Born: Amaryllis April Maltha August; 2003 (age 22–23); Denmark
- Occupation: Actress
- Years active: 2024–present
- Father: Bille August
- Relatives: Anders August (paternal half-brother); Asta Kamma August (paternal half-sister); Alba August (paternal half-sister)

Amaryllis April Maltha August is a Danish actress. She had the lead role in the television series Families like Ours (2024). She is the daughter of Danish filmmaker Bille August.

== Early life and education ==
Amaryllis April Maltha August is the daughter of the Danish director Bille August. She wanted to pursue acting from a young age, but was considering a career in journalism as she felt she was too shy for an acting career.

== Career ==
August had her first big on-screen acting part with the leading role of Laura, a high school student facing a heart-breaking dilemma as the population of Denmark is evacuated ahead of rising sea levels, in Danish television series Families like Ours. The series was co-written and directed by Thomas Vinterberg, She was awarded the part over a four-month casting process involving 13 call-backs, during most of which her parentage was unknown to the production crew, after first auditioning for the role whilst still a student. She attended the premiere for the series at the 2024 Venice Film Festival. Under Vinterberg's guidance she trained in boxing for three months for the role to help "toughen" her demeanor. In the third episode she appeared on-screen alongside her half-sister Asta Kamma August.

She appears as Valentine de Villefort in the 2024 English-language television adaptation of the 19th-century French novel by Alexandre Dumas, The Count of Monte Cristo, appearing alongside Sam Claflin and Jeremy Irons.

== Personal life ==
August is the daughter of film director Bille August and actress Sara-Marie Maltha, and half-sister to Anders August, Asta Kamma August, and Alba August who also work in the same industry, amongst seven siblings and half-siblings.

== Filmography ==
Year	Title	Role	Notes
2024	Families like Ours	Laura	Main role
2024	The Count of Monte Cristo	Valentine de Villefort	8 episodes
