= Blackwater (novel) =

1993 crime novel by Kerstin Ekman

- First edition
- Author: Kerstin Ekman
- Original title: Händelser vid vatten
- Translator: Joan Tate
- Language: Swedish
- Publisher: Albert Bonniers förlag
- Publication date: 1993
- Publication place: Sweden
- English publication date: 1996
- Pages: 466
- ISBN: 91-0-055676-9

Blackwater (Swedish: Händelser vid vatten, lit. 'Events by Water') is a 1993 novel by the Swedish writer Kerstin Ekman. It received the August Prize in 1993 and the Nordic Council Literature Prize in 1994. It also won the Best Swedish Crime Novel Award.

== See also ==
- 1993 in literature
- Swedish literature
- Blackwater (TV series)
