= The Last Journey (2024 film) =

Swedish documentary film

- Theatrical release poster
- Directed by: Filip Hammar; Fredrik Wikingsson
- Produced by: Lars Beckung; Petra Måhl
- Cinematography: Erik Persson; Erik Vallsten; Robin Trollin
- Edited by: Johan Kjellberg Elgemark; Robin Wikner
- Music by: Christian Olsson
- Production companies: Nexiko; Nordisk Film Distribution; RMV Film
- Distributed by: Nordisk Film Distribution
- Release date: 1 March 2024
- Running time: 95 minutes
- Country: Sweden
- Languages: Swedish; French
- Box office: $279,347 (Norway)

The Last Journey (Swedish: Den sista resan) is a 2024 Swedish documentary film directed by Filip Hammar and Fredrik Wikingsson. The film follows the director duo and retired French teacher Lars Hammar, Filip's father, on a trip to France in hopes of rekindling his almost non-existent spark of life. It was selected as the Swedish entry for the Best International Feature Film at the 97th Academy Awards.

== Synopsis ==
After 40 years as a beloved French teacher at Köping, Lars Hammar retires, but becomes passive and apathetic to the dismay of his family. Looking to rekindle the spark in his life, his son Filip and his best friend Fredrik load Lars into a car to head on a road trip to France.

== Cast ==
- Filip Hammar
- Fredrik Wikingsson
- Lars Hammar

== Release ==
It premiered on 1 March 2024, in Swedish theaters, then screened on 17 August 2024, at the 52nd Norwegian International Film Festival. The film was released on 13 September 2024, in Finnish theaters, on 3 October 2024, in Danish theaters, and on 4 October 2024, in Norwegian theaters.

The film was also featured at The 25th European Film Festival held in conjunction with 8th Malaysia International Film Festival in July 2025.

== Reception ==
=== Box-office ===
At the beginning of its fourth week in Swedish cinemas, the film attracted 159,277 spectators. After 8 weeks on the billboard, the film attracted 328,522 viewers, becoming the highest-grossing Swedish documentary in history. It ended its run on the billboard with more than 400,000 spectators.

=== Accolades ===
Year	Award / Festival	Category	Recipient	Result	Ref.
2024	52nd Norwegian International Film Festival	Ray of Sunshine Award	The Last Journey	Won	
2024	25th Newport Beach Film Festival	Audience Award: Best International Documentary	The Last Journey	Won	
2025	60th Guldbagge Awards	Best Film	Lars Beckung and Petra Måhl	Nominated	
2025	60th Guldbagge Awards	Best Director	Filip Hammar and Fredrik Wikingsson	Nominated	
2025	60th Guldbagge Awards	Best Screenplay	Filip Hammar and Fredrik Wikingsson	Nominated	
2025	60th Guldbagge Awards	Best Documentary Feature	Filip Hammar and Fredrik Wikingsson	Won	
2025	60th Guldbagge Awards	Audience Award	Filip Hammar and Fredrik Wikingsson	Won	

== See also ==
- List of submissions to the 97th Academy Awards for Best International Feature Film
- List of Swedish submissions for the Academy Award for Best International Feature Film
