= Crossing (2024 film) =

2024 film

- Festival poster
- Directed by: Levan Akin
- Written by: Levan Akin
- Produced by: Mathilde Dedye
- Starring: Mzia Arabuli; Lucas Kankava; Deniz Dumanlı
- Cinematography: Lisabi Fridell
- Edited by: Levan Akin; Emma Lagrelius
- Production companies: French Quarter Film; Adomeit Film; Easy Riders Film; Bir Film; 1991 Productions; Swedish RMV Film; Sveriges Television; Swedish Film Institute; Eurimages; Nordisk Film & TV Fond
- Distributed by: TriArt Film
- Release dates: 15 February 2024 (Berlinale); 22 March 2024 (Sweden)
- Running time: 106 minutes
- Countries: Sweden; Denmark; France; Turkey; Georgia
- Languages: Georgian; Turkish; English
- Box office: $553,529

Crossing (Turkish: Geçiş, Georgian: გადასვლა, romanized: gadasvla) is a 2024 drama film written and directed by Levan Akin. It stars Mzia Arabuli, Lucas Kankava and Deniz Dumanlı. The film was selected in the Panorama section at the 74th Berlin International Film Festival, where it had its world premiere on 15 February 2024. It was released in Sweden on 22 March 2024, by TriArt Film. It fetched the IFFI ICFT UNESCO Gandhi Medal at the 55th International Film Festival of India.

== Premise ==
Lia, a retired schoolteacher from Georgia, sets out to find her long-lost niece Tekla, a transgender woman. Accompanied by Tekla's former neighbor, the unpredictable Achi, she travels to Istanbul to continue the search. There, they meet Evrim, a transgender legal advocate active in the city's trans community.

== Cast ==
- Mzia Arabuli as Lia
- Lucas Kankava as Achi
- Deniz Dumanlı as Evrim

== Production ==
In January 2023, it was announced Levan Akin had written and directed the film, with principal photography concluding in Istanbul.

== Release ==
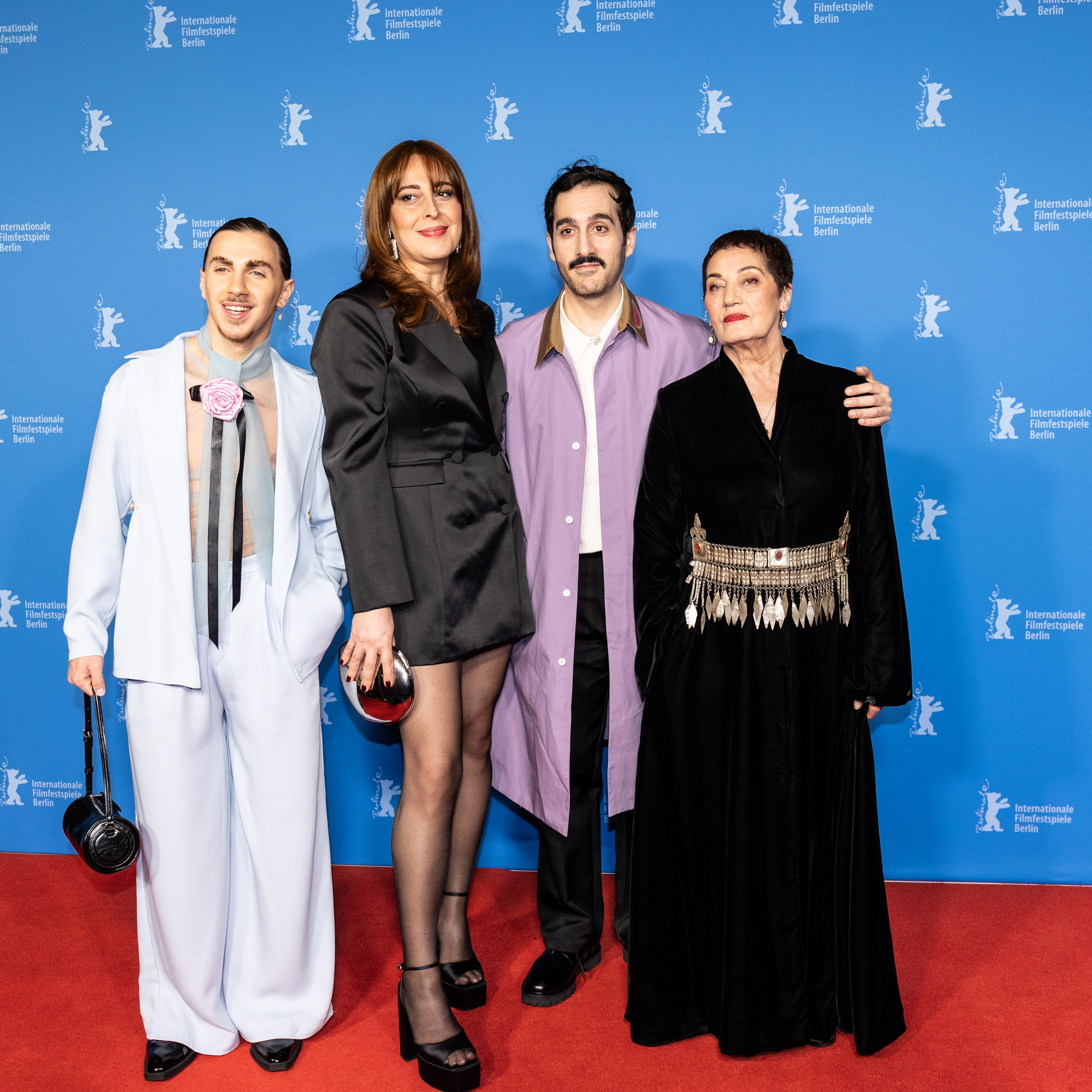
The crew of Crossing at the 74th Berlin International Film Festival

Crossing had its world premiere on 15 February 2024, as part of the 74th Berlin International Film Festival, opening Panorama. Prior to its premier, Mubi acquired distribution rights to the film in North and Latin America, United Kingdom, Ireland, and Germany. It was released in Sweden on 22 March 2024, by TriArt Film.

At Berlin, the film received the Jury Prize from the Teddy Award jury for LGBTQ-themed films.

== Reception ==
On the review aggregator website Rotten Tomatoes, 97% of 60 critics' reviews are positive, with an average rating of 7.9/10. The website's consensus reads: "A tender odyssey with Mzia Arabuli's wonderful performance as the audience's guide, Crossing marks another humanist triumph for writer-director Levan Akin." Metacritic, which uses a weighted average, assigned the film a score of 83 out of 100, based on 17 critics, indicating "universal acclaim".

=== Accolades ===
Award	Ceremony date	Category	Recipient(s)	Result	Ref.
Berlin International Film Festival	15 February 2024	Teddy Award – Jury Prize	Levan Akin	Won	
Guadalajara International Film Festival	15 June 2024	Maguey Award – Special Jury Prize	Levan Akin	Won	
International Film Festival of India	28 November 2024	IFFI ICFT UNESCO Gandhi Medal	Levan Akin	Won	
Guldbagge Awards	13 January 2025	Best Film	Mathilde Dedye	Won	
Guldbagge Awards	13 January 2025	Best Director	Levan Akin	Won	
Guldbagge Awards	13 January 2025	Best Actress in a Leading Role	Mzia Arabuli	Nominated	
Guldbagge Awards	13 January 2025	Best Screenplay	Levan Akin	Nominated	
Guldbagge Awards	13 January 2025	Best Cinematography	Lisabi Fridell	Won	
Guldbagge Awards	13 January 2025	Best Sound Design	Anne Gry Friis Kristensen and Sigrid DPA Jensen	Won	
Guldbagge Awards	13 January 2025	Best Production Design	Roger Rosenberg	Nominated	
GLAAD Media Awards	March 29, 2025	Outstanding Film - Limited Release		Won	
