= Bille August =

Danish film director and screenwriter

Bille August R.
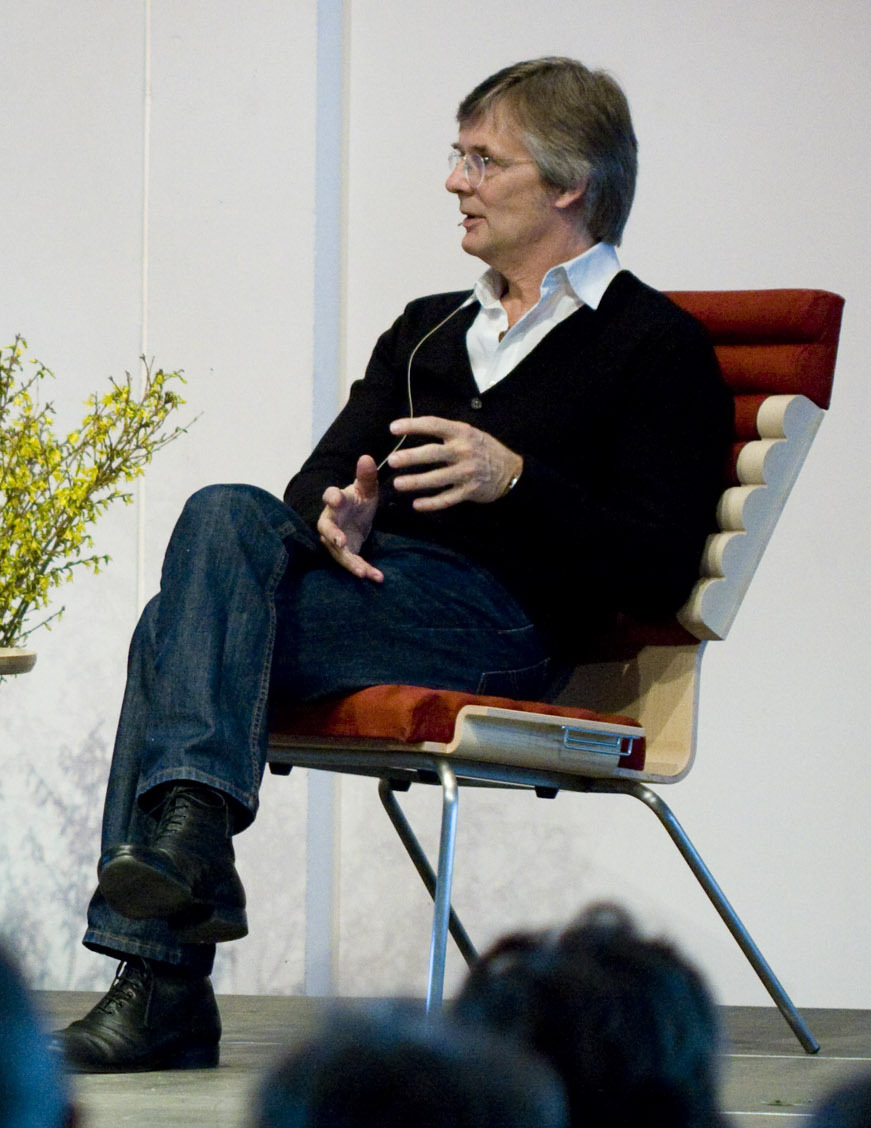
- August in 2008
- Born: 9 November 1948 (age 77); Brede, Denmark
- Occupation: Film director
- Years active: 1978–present
- Spouses: Pernilla August (m. 1991; div. 1997) Sara-Marie Maltha (m. 2012; div. 2024) Michelle Liebetrau (m. 2025)
- Children: 8, including Anders, Asta, Alba, and Amaryllis

Bille August R. (Danish: [ˈpilə ˈɑwkɔst]; born 9 November 1948) is a Danish director, screenwriter, and cinematographer of film and television.

August's 1987 film Pelle the Conqueror won the Palme d'Or, Academy Award and Golden Globe Award. He is one of only ten directors to win the Palme d'Or twice, winning the award again in 1992 for The Best Intentions, based on the autobiographical script by Ingmar Bergman.

His filmography includes The House of the Spirits, based on the novel by Isabel Allende; Smilla's Sense of Snow; Les Misérables; Night Train to Lisbon, Silent Heart, The Chinese Widow and A Fortunate Man. He has received five Robert Awards (including Best Film and Best Director) and three Bodil Awards for Best Danish Film. He is also a Knight of the Order of the Dannebrog.

== Life and career ==
August was born on 9 November 1948, in Brede, Denmark. After attending local schools, he graduated from the Foto- och Dokumentärskolan in Stockholm, Sweden, and later from the National Film School of Denmark. He began his career as a cinematographer. He made his feature directorial debut in 1978 with In My Life, which won the Bodil Award for Best Danish Film.

He collaborated twice with then wife Pernilla August under George Lucas on The Adventures of Young Indiana Jones in The Perils of Cupid and Tales of Innocence. Pernilla would later star in the first two films of the Star Wars prequel trilogy and appeared in an episode of The Clone Wars television series to reprise her role from the films.

After decades of writing, directing and producing notable films in Denmark, on 23 September 2011, Bille August announced that he had opened a studio in Hangzhou, China and taken a position as Tianpeng Media's Art Director, in order to produce Chinese films for Tianpeng Media over the next few years. Tianpeng Media is a new media company established in 2010. The company produced two films, The Women Knight of Mirror (竞雄女侠秋瑾) and The Years of Qi Xiao Fu (七小福之燃情岁月), to be released later in 2011. He is the first foreign director to be hired by the Chinese film company. In 2011, August also accepted the invitation from the Hangzhou government to serve as a "culture consultant" for the city.

His film Night Train to Lisbon (2013) premiered out of competition at the 63rd Berlin International Film Festival. He had planned to direct a Gianni Versace biopic with Antonio Banderas as Versace, but this project was cancelled. In August 2021, it was announced that August would direct a feature film adaptation of Karen Blixen's novel Ehrengard, which is being produced by Netflix and SF Studios.

== Filmography ==
=== Film ===
Director

Year	Title	Director	Writer	Notes
1978	In My Life	Yes	Yes	
1983	Zappa	Yes	Yes	
1984	Busters verden	Yes	No	
1984	Twist and Shout	Yes	Yes	
1987	Pelle the Conqueror	Yes	Yes	
1992	The Best Intentions	Yes	No	
1993	The House of the Spirits	Yes	Yes	
1996	Jerusalem	Yes	Yes	
1997	Smilla's Sense of Snow	Yes	No	
1998	Les Misérables	Yes	No	
2001	A Song for Martin	Yes	Yes	Also producer
2004	Return to Sender	Yes	No	
2007	Goodbye Bafana	Yes	Yes	
2007	To Each His Own Cinema	Yes	No	Segment "The Last Dating Show"
2012	The Passion of Marie	Yes	No	
2013	Night Train to Lisbon	Yes	No	
2014	Silent Heart	Yes	No	
2017	The Chinese Widow	Yes	No	
2017	55 Steps	Yes	No	
2018	A Fortunate Man	Yes	Yes	
2021	The Pact	Yes	No	
2022	The Kiss	Yes	Yes	
2023	Ehrengard: The Art of Seduction	Yes	No	

Director of photography

Year	Title	Director	Notes
1977	Christiania	Flemming Colstrup; Ove Nyholm	Documentary film
1977	Hemåt i natten	Jon Lindström	
1978	Men Can't Be Raped	Jörn Donner	
1980	Love	Theodor Kallifatides	
1980	Mördare! Mördare!	Jon Lindström	
1980	Tomas: A Child You Cannot Reach	Lone Hertz	Documentary film
1981	Killing Heat	Michael Raeburn	
1982	Sova räv	Gun Jönsson	

=== Television ===
Miniseries

Year	Title	Director	Writer
1978	Et par dage med Magnus	Yes	No
2024	The Count of Monte Cristo	Yes	No

TV movies

Year	Title	Director	Writer
1980	Verden er så stor, så stor	Yes	Yes
1982	Maj	Yes	No
2003	Detaljer	Yes	Yes

TV series

Year	Title	Notes
1993	The Young Indiana Jones Chronicles	2 episodes

== Awards and nominations ==
Year	Title	Notes
1978	In My Life	Bodil Award for Best Danish Film; Nominated- Chicago Gold Hugo; Nominated- Golden Moscow Prize
1983	Zappa	Nominated- Golden Moscow Prize
1984	Busters verden	UNICEF Award; C.I.F.E.J. Prize of the International Film Festival for Children and Youth
1984	Twist and Shout	Robert Award for Best Screenplay; UNICEF Award; C.I.F.E.J. Prize of the International Film Festival for Children and Youth; Nominated- Golden Moscow Prize
1987	Pelle the Conqueror	Palme d'Or; Bodil Award for Best Danish Film; Robert Award for Best Danish Film; Robert Award for Best Screenplay; Guldbagge Award for Best Film; Nominated- César Award for Best European Film
1992	The Best Intentions	Palme d'Or; Nominated- Guldbagge Award for Best Director
1993	The House of the Spirits	Robert Award for Best Danish Film; Robert Award for Best Screenplay
1996	Jerusalem	Lübeck Nordic Film Days
1997	Smilla's Sense of Snow	Nominated- Golden Berlin Bear
1998	Les Misérables	Nominated- Golden Cairo Pyramid Award
2001	A Song for Martin	Nominated- Bodil Award for Best Danish Film; Nominated- Crystal Globe; Nominated- Guldbagge Award for Best Director; Nominated- Guldbagge Award for Best Screenplay; Nominated- Golden Festroia Dolphin; Nominated- Miami Grand Jury Prize
2007	Goodbye Bafana	Berlin Peace Film Award; Capri Arts Award; Nominated- Golden Berlin Bear Cinema for Peace Award for the Most Valuable Director of the Year
2012	The Passion of Marie	Nominated- Chicago Gold Hugo
2014	Silent Heart	Bodil Award for Best Danish Film; Nominated- Robert Award for Best Danish Film; Nominated- Robert Award for Best Director; Nominated- Robert Audience Award; Nominated- Nordic Council Film Prize; Nominated- Golden Shell
2017	The Chinese Widow	Nominated- Shanghai Golden Goblet Award for Best Feature Film
2018	A Fortunate Man	Beijing Tiantian Award for Best Film; Nominated- Robert Award for Best Danish Film; Nominated- Robert Award for Best Director; Nominated- Robert Award for Best Adapted Screenplay; Nominated- Filmfest Hamburg Critics Choice Award
2021	The Pact	Nominated- Beijing Tiantian Award for Best Film
