= Mzia Arabuli =

Georgian actress (born 1954)

- მზია არაბული
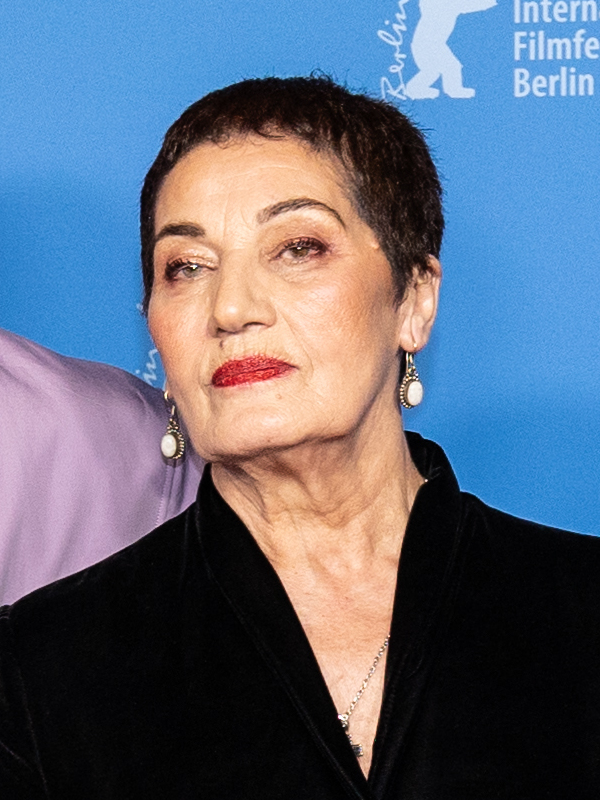
- Arabuli at the 74th Berlin International Film Festival in 2024
- Born: 15 June 1954 (age 72); Tbilisi, Georgian SSR, Soviet Union
- Citizenship: Georgia
- Education: Shota Rustaveli Theatre and Film University
- Occupation: Actress
- Years active: 1975–present

Mzia Arabuli (Georgian: მზია არაბული; born 15 June 1954) is a Georgian actress. Known for her theatre work in Tbilisi, she became known to wider audiences after appearing in the main role in the 2024 drama film Crossing, for which she was nominated for the Guldbagge Award for Best Actress in a Leading Role.

== Biography ==
Arabuli was born in Tbilisi to a family originally from Khevsureti. In 1975, she graduated from the acting faculty of the Shota Rustaveli Theatre and Film University; that same year, she began working for the newly-established Tumanishvili Theatre. Arabuli has appeared in various plays performed there, including playing Shushanik in Martyrdom of the Holy Queen Shushanik; Mzeha in Such is the Mortal World; Zenata in The Pigs of Bakula; Bernarda in The House of Bernarda Alba; and Hippolyta in A Midsummer Night's Dream.

Arabuli made her film debut in 1977, playing mothers in the films Eskulapis motsape by Otar Abesadze and Dauvitskari dge by Tengiz Magalashvili. She has also appeared in Tsinaparta mitsa by Giuli Lorktipanidze and Giga Chohonelidze; Zgapari by Kote Surmava; The Old Truck Driver by T. Koshadze; The Caravan of Wisdom by O. Koridze; The Legend of Suram Fortress by Sergei Parajanov and Dodo Abashidze; The Sadness of Humanity by G. Choheli; Hareba and Gogia by G. Shengelia; Tskhovreba Don Kikhotisa da Sancho Pansasi by Revaz Chkheidze; and Lolita by R. Giorgobiani. In 2024, Arabuli played the leading role in the film Crossing, written and directed by Levan Akin, earning a nomination for best actress in a leading role at the 60th Guldbagge Awards

Arabuli is also a lyricist and vocalist on the album Ias utkharit, which she made alongside Gogi Dzodzuaşvili.
