= Karin Arrhenius =

Swedish screenwriter (born 1972)

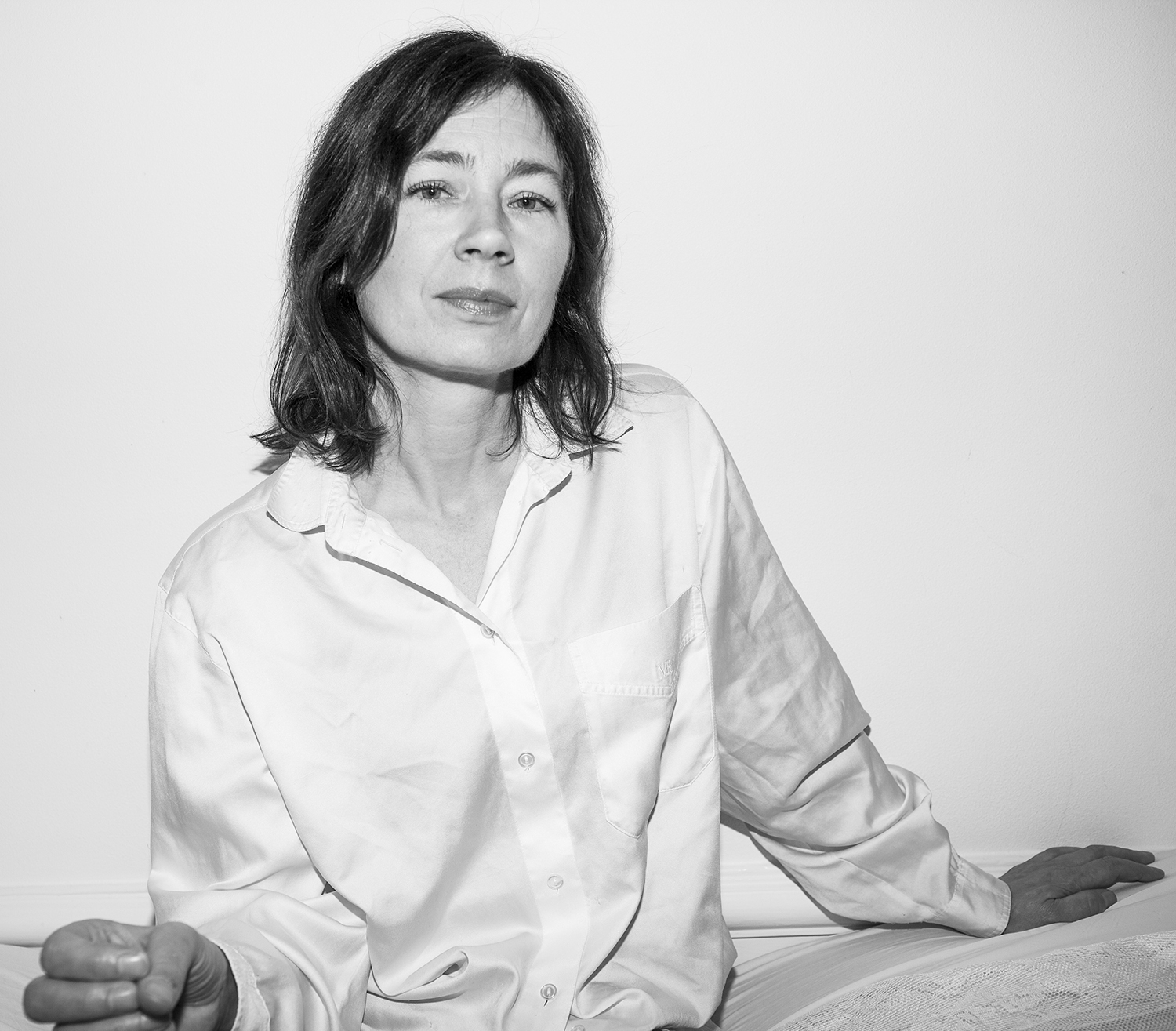
- Arrhenius in 2025
- Born: 27 December 1972 (age 53)
- Education: Dramatiska Institutet
- Occupation: Screenwriter

Karin Arrhenius (born 27 December 1972) is a Swedish screenwriter. She has written films, such as The Girl (2009) and Faro (2013). She has also worked on television series, including Blackwater (2023), Life on Seacrow Island (2025), and My Brother (2025).

== Early life and education ==
She was born on 27 December 1972. She and her brothers were raised in an old farmhouse located in the countryside between Linköping and Mjölby, in the vicinity of Östra Tollstad and Västra Harg. As a youth, she was involved in various activities, including football, horse riding, ping pong, and dance. She studied screenwriting at the Dramatiska Institutet from 2001 to 2004.

== Career ==
She wrote the script for The Girl, set in the summer of 1981 and following an unnamed 10-year-old girl left behind as the rest of her family travels to Africa to do charity work. Her partner Fredrik Edfeldt directed. The film received an average rating of 3.8 on the Swedish review aggregator site Kritiker, based on 25 critics' reviews. It was also nominated in four categories at the Guldbagge Awards, including Arrhenius' nomination for Best Screenplay. She was the screenwriter for In Your Veins; the film was based on a novel by Lotta Thell and premiered in 2009. Arrhenius and Edfeldt collaborated again for a second film, Faro (2013).

With Maren Louise Käehne, she adapted Kerstin Ekman's book into the 2023 crime drama series Blackwater. She and Edfeldt wrote and directed, respectively, Life on Seacrow Island, which was released on 31 October 2025. The series was a remake of a 1964 series of the same name written by Astrid Lindgren. She adapted Karin Smirnoff's debut novel into My Brother, a four-episode miniseries, which premiered 26 December 2025 on SVT Play and the following day on SVT1. In a positive review for Dagens Nyheter, Fredrik Sahlin praised Arrhenius' writing, stating "she [did] complete justice to the original's stark, hard-boiled language" (gör hon förlagans karga, hårdkokta språk full rättvisa).
