= Svinalängorna (novel) =

2006 novel by Susanna Alakoski

- First edition
- Author: Susanna Alakoski
- Language: Swedish
- Set in: Ystad
- Publisher: Albert Bonniers förlag
- Publication date: 2006
- Publication place: Sweden
- Pages: 256
- ISBN: 91-0-011033-7

Svinalängorna (lit. The Swine Rows) is the debut novel by Swedish author Susanna Alakoski, published in 2006.

Set in Sweden in the 1960s and 1970s, the novel is about a Finnish immigrant family struggling with alcoholism.

The novel has sold over 400,000 copies in Sweden. It won the August Prize in 2006. A film adaptation, Beyond, directed by Pernilla August, was released in 2010.
