= The Pact (2021 film) =

2021 film by Bille August

- Poster
- Danish: Pagten
- Directed by: Bille August
- Written by: Christian Torpe
- Produced by: Jesper Morthorst; Karin Trolle
- Starring: Birthe Neumann; Simon Bennebjerg; Nanna Voss
- Cinematography: Manuel Alberto Claro
- Edited by: Janus Billeskov Jansen
- Music by: Frédéric Vercheval
- Production companies: Nordisk Film Production; SF Studios; Motor
- Distributed by: Juno Films
- Release date: August 5, 2021; Denmark
- Running time: 115 minutes
- Country: Denmark
- Language: Danish

The Pact (Danish: Pagten) is a 2021 drama film directed by Bille August.

== Synopsis ==
In dire straits, aging literary icon Karen Blixen (Isak Dinesen) strikes a deal with a young poet, Thorkild Bjørnvig. Blixen, yearning to recapture a spark, promises to mentor Bjørnvig into greatness in exchange for his unwavering obedience.

== Cast ==
- Birthe Neumann as Karen Blixen
- Simon Bennebjerg as Thorkild Bjørnvig
- Nanna Voss as Grete
- Asta Kamma August as Benedicte
- Anders Heinrichsen as Knud W. Jensen

== Reception ==
On the review aggregator Rotten Tomatoes website, the film has an approval rating of 79% based on 14 reviews, with an average rating of 6.5/10. Om Metacritic, the film received a score of 59 out of 100, based on 7 critics, indicating "mixed or average" reviews.

=== Accolades ===
Award	Category	Recipient	Result	Ref.
Bodil Award	Best Actress	Birthe Neumann	Won	
Bodil Award	Best Actor	Simon Bjenneberg	Nominated	
