= Mary, Mother of Jesus (film) =

1999 American television film

- UK DVD Cover
- Written by: Albert Ross
- Directed by: Kevin Connor
- Starring: Christian Bale; Pernilla August; Melinda Kinnaman; David Threlfall; Simone Bendix
- Theme music composer: Ken Thorne
- Country of origin: United States
- Original language: English

Production
- Producers: Howard Ellis; Eunice Kennedy Shriver
- Cinematography: Elemér Ragályi
- Editor: Barry Peters
- Running time: 88 minutes
- Production companies: Metropolitan Productions; The Shriver Family Production Company

Original release
- Network: NBC
- Release: November 14, 1999

Mary, Mother of Jesus is a 1999 American made-for-television biblical drama film that retells the story of Jesus through the eyes of Mary, his mother.

== Plot ==
Although not everything in the film is recorded in the New Testament, the film emphasizes Mary's importance in Jesus' life by, for example, suggesting that his parables were inspired by stories Mary told him in his childhood, and portraying the risen Jesus appearing to Mary privately. The film closes with Mary suggesting that the death of her son is not the end, but the beginning, and that she and the disciples should start preaching about Jesus, and "teach as he taught, live as he lived, love as he loved."

== Production ==
The film stars Swedish actresses Pernilla August and Melinda Kinnaman as Mary, English actor David Threlfall as Joseph and British actor Christian Bale as Jesus. The film was produced by American Eunice Kennedy Shriver and aired on NBC.

== Cast ==
- Christian Bale as Jesus of Nazareth
  - Toby Bailiff as Young Jesus
- Pernilla August as Mary of Nazareth
  - Melinda Kinnaman as Young Mary
- David Threlfall as Joseph of Nazareth
- Simone Bendix as Mary Magdalene
- Robert Addie as Pontius Pilate
- John Shrapnel as Simon
- Edward Hardwicke as Zechariah
- Hywel Bennett as Herod
- Geraldine Chaplin as Elizabeth
- Michael Mears as John
- Mark Jax as Peter
- Anna Mathias as Anne
- Crispian Belfrage as James the Great
- Christopher Routh as John the Baptist
- Andrew Grainger as Barrabas
- John Light as Archangel Gabriel
- David Schofield as Micah
- Iván Darvas as Silas
- Christopher Lawford as Reuben
- Judy Cornwell as Innkeeper's Wife
- Lajos Balázsovits as Chamberlin
- Zoltán Gera as Astrologer #1
- János Kulka as Melchior
- László Görög as Shepherd #2

== See also ==
- List of American films of 1999
- List of films shot in Budapest
- 1999 in American television
