= Melinda Kinnaman =

Swedish-American actress (born 1971)

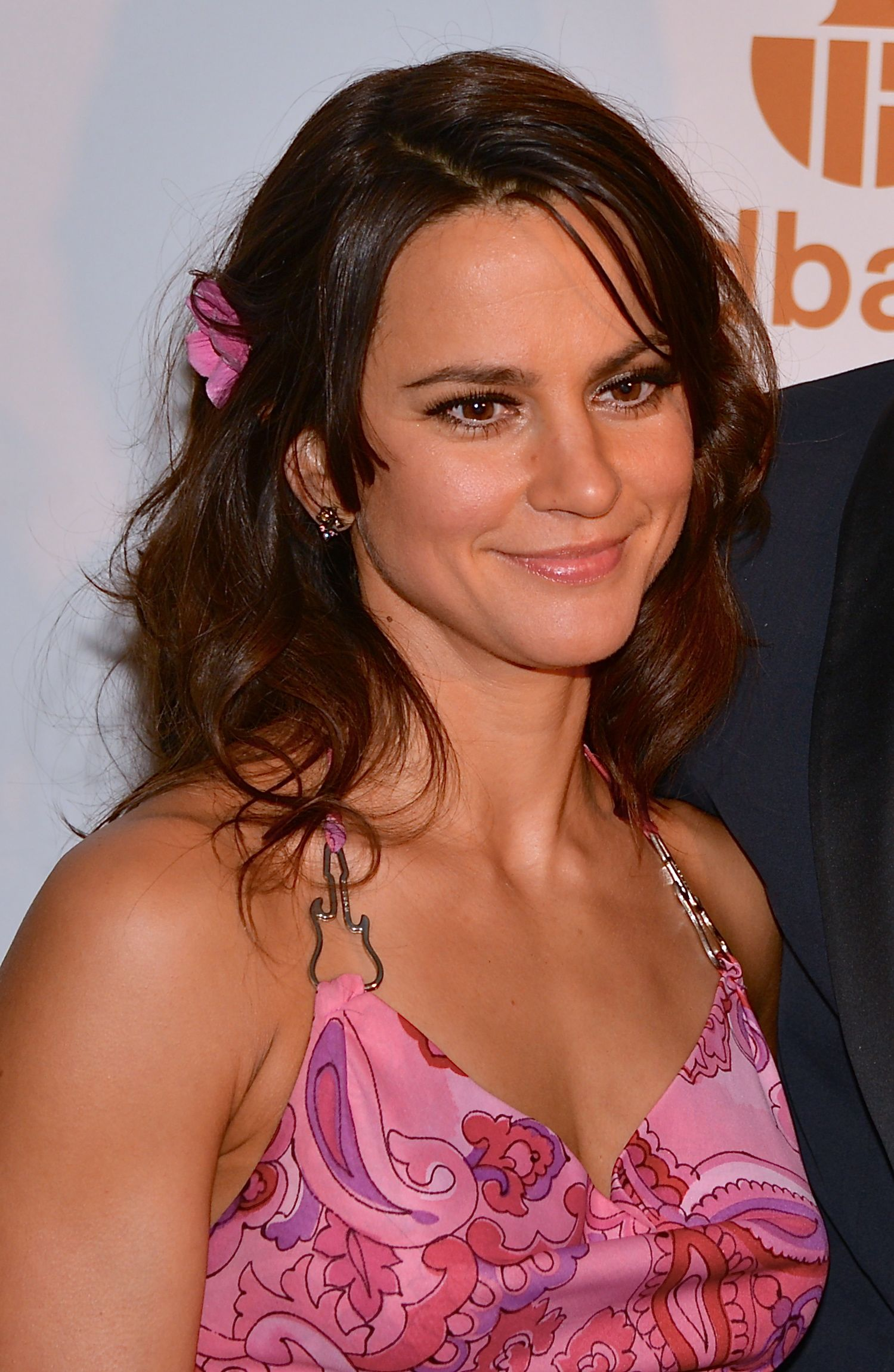
- Melinda Kinnaman at the 2013 Guldbagge Award.
- Born: Melinda Rosalie Kinnaman; 9 November 1971 (age 54); Stockholm, Sweden
- Occupation: Actress
- Years active: 1985–present
- Relatives: Joel Kinnaman (half-brother)

Melinda Rosalie Kinnaman (born 9 November 1971) is a Swedish-American actress.

== Early life ==
Kinnaman is a dual citizen of Sweden and the United States. Kinnaman was born in Stockholm, Sweden, to American parents Dee and Steve Kinnaman. Her father, originally David Kinnaman, is an American who was drafted during the Vietnam War and deserted the military from his base in Bangkok.

Her paternal half-brother Joel Kinnaman is also an actor.

== Career ==
By age thirteen, she made her acting debut, portraying the tomboy Saga in the acclaimed 1985 movie My Life as a Dog, directed by Lasse Hallström, for which she won Best Young Actress in A Foreign Film at the 9th Youth in Film Awards. She was educated at the Swedish National Academy of Mime and Acting in Stockholm from 1991 to 1994. Since then she has been part of the ensemble at the Royal Dramatic Theatre in Stockholm and had major parts in many classics, such as Iphigenia in Iphigenia at Aulis (1995), Bianca in The Taming of the Shrew (1997), Anja in The Cherry Orchard (1997), Estelle in Sartre's No Exit (2000), Marie in Woyzeck (2003), Jessica in The Merchant of Venice (2004) and Martirio in The House of Bernarda Alba (2008). In 2011, she played the violinist in Duet for One.

She has also developed acrobatics skills and worked with theatre interwoven with contemporary circus at the Royal Dramatic Theatre with Robert Lepage's magical production of August Strindberg's A Dream Play and advanced even more in the lead of a brave acrobatic staging of Shakespeare's Romeo and Juliet (2002).

She followed up on that for a few years guest performing in Copenhagen in Shakespeare's The Tempest and HC Andersen's The Little Mermaid. She has participated in productions of modern dance in Stockholm.

On stage, screen and television she has worked in major parts with many prominent personalities, such as Bo Widerberg in The Serpents Way (1986), August Strindberg's The Father and Hedvig in Henrik Ibsen's The Wild Duck (1989), Hans Alfredson in Time of the Wolf (1988), Colin Nutley in British-Swedish TV series The Way Home (1989), Ingmar Bergman and Daniel Bergman in Sunday's Children (1992), as well as with contemporary dramatists such as Lars Norén and Henning Mankell. In 1999, she shared the title role in the international film Mary, Mother of Jesus with Pernilla August.

From 2015 to 2017, she played the leading role of Inger Johanne Vik, a criminal psychologist and profiler, in the Swedish television psychological thriller series Modus.
