= Stockholm Bloodbath (film) =

Historical drama film

- Directed by: Mikael Håfström
- Screenplay by: Erlend Loe; Nora Landsrød
- Produced by: Helena Danielsson
- Starring: Claes Bang; Emily Beecham; Sophie Cookson
- Cinematography: Pär M. Ekberg
- Edited by: Richard Krantz
- Music by: Steffen Thum; Lorne Balfe
- Production companies: Viaplay Studios; Nordisk Film
- Release dates: December 12, 2023 (Lucia Movie Night); January 19, 2024 (Sweden)
- Countries: Denmark; Sweden
- Language: English

Stockholm Bloodbath is a 2023 film directed by Mikael Håfström, with an ensemble cast featuring Sophie Cookson, Emily Beecham and Claes Bang. It is produced by Helena Danielsson for Viaplay Studios. Set in Stockholm in 1520, a power struggle between the Swedes and the Danes ends in the massacre that became known as the Stockholm Bloodbath.

== Synopsis ==
A group of Swedish aristocrats want out of the Scandinavian Kalmar Union and are conspiring to overthrow Christian II of Denmark, who is on his way to Stockholm to put an end to Sten Sture and the Swedish rebels. Meanwhile, Anne Eriksson and her foster sister Freja are seeking revenge on those who killed their family on Anne's wedding day.

== Cast ==
- Sophie Cookson as Anne Eriksson
- Alba August as Freja Eriksson
- Claes Bang as King Christian II
- Emily Beecham as Christina Gyllenstierna
- Adam Pålsson as Sten Sture
- Ulrich Thomsen as Hemming Gadh
- Jakob Oftebro as Gustav Trolle
- Wilf Scolding as Johan
- Thomas Chaanhing as Sylvestre
- Mikkel Boe Følsgaard as Didrik Slagheck
- Kate Ashfield as Birgitta
- Matias Varela as Cardinal Francisco De La Roca
- Wayne Brett as Bishop Vincentius Bellenack

== Production ==
The project was announced by Viaplay Studios in February 2022. Mikael Håfström directs the film from a screenplay written by Erlend Loe and Nora Landsrød. Helena Danielsson is the producer on the film for Viaplay Studios in co-production with Nordisk Film. The score was written by Steffen Thum with Lorne Balfe.

First stills from filming were released in November 2022 showing Claes Bang, Sophie Cookson, and Emily Beecham in costume. Filming locations included Hungary and the Czech Republic.

== Release ==
The film premiered at the Lucia Movie Night on December 12, 2023, and was released in Sweden on January 19, 2024. It was a box office failure.
