= Levan Akin =

Swedish filmmaker (born 1979)

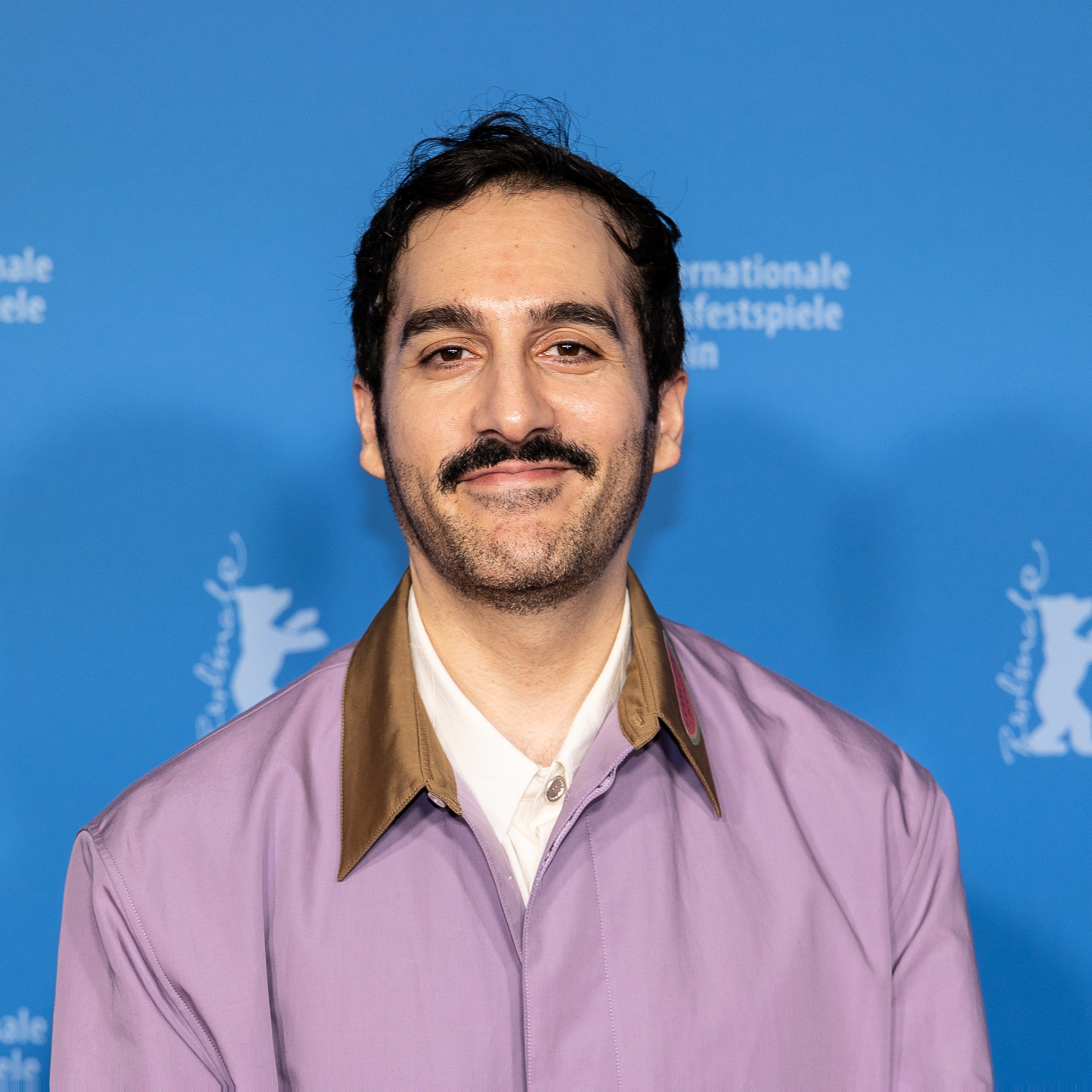
- Levan Akin at the 74th Berlin International Film Festival in 2024
- Born: 14 December 1979 (age 46); Botkyrka, Sweden
- Occupations: Film director; screenwriter
- Years active: 2007－present

Levan Akin (born 14 December 1979) is a Swedish film director and screenwriter, best known for his film And Then We Danced, that received critical acclaim and won the 2019 Guldbagge Award for Best Film.

== Biography ==
Levan Akin was born and raised in Tumba, Sweden. His family is among the Georgians who emigrated to the Ottoman Empire after the Russo-Turkish War of 1877. His parents emigrated from Turkey to Sweden in 1965. Akin returns to Georgia every year with his sister for the summer holidays. There he consolidates his knowledge of Georgian culture and the practice of the Georgian language. He is openly gay.

=== Career ===
Akin started out as an assistant director in film productions, mainly at Sveriges Television. He worked at Studio 24 for the production of You, the Living (Du Levande) by Roy Andersson (2007).

In 2008, he won two awards at the Hamburg Film Festival alongside film designer and producer Erika Stark for the short film De sista sakerna (2008). Levan Akin then directed series such as Second Avenue (Andra Avenyn, 2008–2010), Livet i Fagervik (2009), Anno 1790 (2011) and Real Humans (Äkta människor, 2012) for the television channel Sveriges Television.

In autumn 2011, his first feature film Katinkas kalas, premiered at the Stockholm International Film Festival. The plot focuses on the inner tensions of a group of young people celebrating a birthday on a summer night. Three of the cast, mostly not known to the wider public, received nominations for the L'Oréal Paris Rising Star award, and Yohanna Idha was nominated for 2013 Guldbagge Award as Best Supporting Actress.

In 2019, Akin's second film And Then We Danced was released to critical acclaim. It was premiered in the Directors' Fortnight section at the 2019 Cannes Film Festival where it received a fifteen-minute standing ovation. Set in Georgia, the film follows Merab, a student from a Georgian traditional dance school who falls in love with his male rival. The Georgian Orthodox Church officially expressed its disapproval of the promotion and screening of the film, and the release of the film in November 2019 caused riots in Tbilisi and Batumi.

In June 2020, Akin was selected as a member of the Academy of Motion Picture Arts and Sciences.

In 2024, Akin's third film Crossing had its world premiere at the 74th Berlin International Film Festival.

== Filmography ==
=== Feature films ===
Year	English Title	Original Title	Notes
2011		Katinkas kalas	
2015	The Circle	Cirkeln	
2019	And Then We Danced	და ჩვენ ვიცეკვეთ	
2024	Crossing	გადასვლა	
TBA	Summer in Heat		In production

=== TV series ===
- 2007: Labyrint mobisodes
- 2008–2010: Second Avenue (Andra Avenyn) (Directed 10 episodes)
- 2009: Livet i Fagervik (Directed 3 episodes)
- 2011: Anno 1790 (Directed 3 episodes)
- 2012: Real Humans (Äkta människor) (Directed 4 episodes)
- 2021: Dough (Deg) (Directed 2 episodes; also writer)
- 2022–present: Interview with the Vampire (Directed 7 episodes; also co-executive producer of season 2)

=== Short film ===
- 2008: De sista sakerna
