= Pernilla August =

Swedish actress and filmmaker (born 1958)

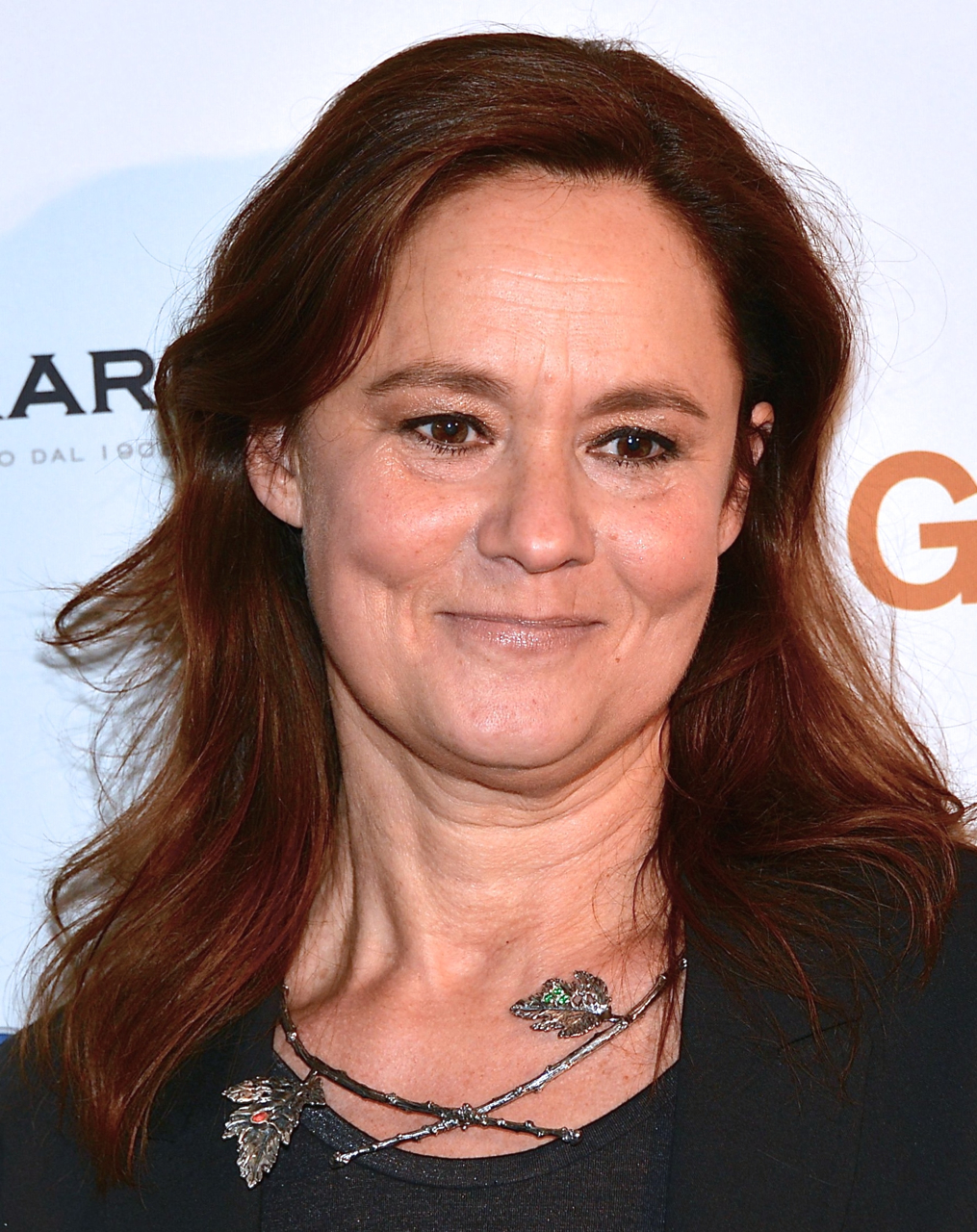
- Pernilla August at the Guldbagge Award in 2013
- Born: Mia Pernilla Hertzman-Ericson; 13 February 1958 (age 68); Stockholm, Sweden
- Other names: Pernilla Östergren; Pernilla Wallgren; Pernilla Wallgren-Östergren
- Occupations: Actress, film director
- Years active: 1975–present
- Spouses: Klas Östergren (m. 1982; div. 1989) Bille August (m. 1991; div. 1997)
- Children: 3, including Asta and Alba
- Relatives: Anders August (former stepson)

Pernilla August (Swedish pronunciation: [pæˈɳɪ̂lːa ˈǎʊɡɵst] née: Hertzman-Ericson; born 13 February 1958), also known as Pernilla Östergren, Pernilla Wallgren, and Pernilla Wallgren-Östergren, is a Swedish actress, director and screenwriter. She was a longtime collaborator with director Ingmar Bergman and won the Best Actress Award at the 1992 Cannes Film Festival for her role in his film The Best Intentions. She is best known internationally for portraying Shmi Skywalker in George Lucas's Star Wars: Episode I – The Phantom Menace and Star Wars: Episode II – Attack of the Clones.

== Early life and education ==
Pernilla August was born on 13 February 1958, as Mia Pernilla Hertzman-Ericson, in Stockholm, Sweden.

She started acting during her childhood, in the theatre and at school.

== Career ==
=== Acting ===
August's professional acting career started in 1975 when director Roy Andersson cast her in a minor role in the film Giliap the same year, followed from 1979 by films by other directors, Vilgot Sjöman (among them, the film about Alfred Nobel, 1983) and Lasse Hallström. She studied acting at Swedish National Academy of Mime and Acting in Stockholm 1979–82.

Before finishing her studies, she attracted the attention of Ingmar Bergman, who cast her in his film Fanny and Alexander (1982), playing the nanny in the director's romanticised portrait of his childhood. That marked the beginning of two decades of collaboration, collecting several international awards, including television series The Best Intentions (1991), in which she portrayed Bergman's mother and met her second husband to be, director Bille August, and TV-productions Private Confessions (1996), directed by Liv Ullmann and Bergman's own In the Presence of a Clown (1997).

August also starred in Bo Widerberg's The Serpent's Way (1986) as well as his TV-production of Henrik Ibsen's The Wild Duck (1989). Among the many Scandinavian and international films are also Bille August's Jerusalem (1996), Richard Hobert's Where the Rainbow Ends (1999) [granted her a Guldbagge Award as Best actress] and The Birthday (2000], I Am Dina (2002), Björn Runge's Om jag vänder mig om/If I Turn Around (2003) [a Silver Bear at Berlin International Film Festival 2004 and more Best actress awards], Per Fly's Manslaughter (2005), Swedish-Taiwanese Miss Kicki (2009) and Jan Troell's Truth and Consequence (2012).

At the Royal Dramatic Theatre in Stockholm, August has acted in several plays, starting 1981, several directed by Ingmar Bergman and touring internationally. These include Ophelia in William Shakespeare's Hamlet (1986) [a part she has also played in another Swedish television film, 1985], August Strindberg's A Dream Play (1986), Nora in Henrik Ibsen's A Doll's House (1989), Hermione in Bergman's special version of A Winter's Tale (1994), the title role in Schiller's Mary Stuart (2000) and Helene Alving in Ibsen's Ghosts (2002). She also worked with Russian director Jurij Ljubimov in Alexander Pushkin's A Feast in the Time of Plague (1996). In 1983–84, she worked at Folkteatern i Gävleborg (The Folk Theatre in Gävleborg) with director Peter Oskarson in Anton Chekhov's Three Sisters. In 2008, she acted in the stage production of Steel Magnolias in Stockholm.

August appeared in two episodes of George Lucas's The Young Indiana Jones Chronicles in 1993. Many in the English-speaking world know her best as Shmi Skywalker, the mother of Anakin Skywalker, from Lucas's Star Wars: Episode I – The Phantom Menace (1999), and its sequel Attack of the Clones (2002). She shared the role as Virgin Mary in Mary, Mother of Jesus (1999) with Melinda Kinnaman. She played a significant role in the Swedish film Sprängaren (2001) alongside Helena Bergström. In 2004 August voiced Madame Suliman in the Swedish dub of Howl's Moving Castle. In 2011, she reprised her role as Shmi Skywalker in the third season of Star Wars: The Clone Wars for the episode "Overlords", which aired in 2011. She played the recurring character of Queen Kristina of Sweden in the Netflix series Young Royals, which premiered in 2021. In 2023 she appeared as Annie in the television series Blackwater, with her daughters Asta and Alba playing young Annie and Annie's daughter Mia.

=== Directing ===
After her directorial debut with the 2005 short film Time Bomb (Blindgångare), August debuted as feature-film director and screenwriter in 2010 with Beyond, starring Noomi Rapace and Ola Rapace. The film was selected as the Swedish entry for the Best Foreign Language Film at the 84th Academy Awards and was much awarded at the Swedish Guldbagge Awards, including for Best Director and Best Script.

In October 2011, August was asked to direct a new Danish drama series, Arvingerne (The Legacy). The series premiered on DR on 1 January 2014, and proved to be very successful, winning several awards and selling internationally to over 40 countries. It was renewed for two further series, which finished airing in 2017.

== Awards and honours ==
At the 1992 Cannes Film Festival August won the award for Best Actress, for her role in Bille August's The Best Intentions. For the same film she also won the Best Actress award at the 28th Guldbagge Awards.

In 2002 she was honoured with the Royal Swedish medal Litteris et Artibus for her artistic work.

== Personal life ==
August has been married twice and changed her name both times. In 1982, she married Klas Östergren, with whom she had one daughter. The marriage ended in divorce in 1989. Her second marriage, in 1991, was to Bille August, with whom she has two daughters. That marriage also ended in divorce, in 1997. Her daughters are Agnes, Asta, and Alba.

She has been known as Pernilla Östergren, Pernilla Wallgren, and Pernilla Wallgren-Östergren.
