= Beyond (2010 film) =

- Theatrical release poster
- Directed by: Pernilla August
- Screenplay by: Pernilla August; Lolita Ray
- Story by: Susanna Alakoski
- Produced by: Helena Danielsson; Ralf Karlsson
- Starring: Noomi Rapace; Ola Rapace; Tehilla Blad; Outi Mäenpää; Ville Virtanen
- Cinematography: Erik Molberg Hansen
- Edited by: Åsa Mossberg
- Music by: Magnus Jarlbo; Sebastian Öberg
- Production company: Drakfilm Produktion
- Distributed by: Nordisk Film
- Release date: 6 September 2010 (Venice Film Festival)
- Running time: 92 minutes
- Country: Sweden
- Languages: Swedish; Finnish

Beyond is a 2010 Swedish drama film directed by Pernilla August, starring Noomi Rapace, Ola Rapace, Tehilla Blad, Outi Mäenpää and Ville Virtanen. The original Swedish title is Svinalängorna, which means "The swine rows" and refers to the housing project where parts of the story are set. The film is based on the novel with the same name by Susanna Alakoski. It was shown at the 67th Venice International Film Festival on 6 September 2010 and got the International Critic's Week Award.

Set in Sweden in the 1960s and 1970s, the film is about a Finnish immigrant family struggling with alcoholism.

The Swedish Film Institute submitted Beyond for a 2011 Academy Award for Best Foreign Language Film nomination, but it did not make the final shortlist.

== Cast ==
- Noomi Rapace as Leena
- Tehilla Blad as Young Leena
- Ola Rapace as Johan
- Outi Mäenpää as Aili
- Ville Virtanen as Kimmo
- Rasmus Troedsson as Sten
- Alpha Blad as Marja
- Junior Blad as Sakari
- Selma Cuba as Flisan

== Plot ==
On Saint Lucia's day, the happy life of a young Swedish family is disturbed by an unexpected phone call. Leena learns that her mother, with whom she's been broken for years, is dying and wants to say goodbye. Johan understands only up to a certain point the disturbance of his wife and, despite the many resistances, convinces her to leave with the two little girls to reach their unknown grandmother, hospitalized at 600 km away.

The return to Ystad awakens in Leena memories of a childhood full of pain. The parents, immigrants from Finland, were a poor but also close-knit couple until the alcohol had taken over, weighing not so much on little Leena, already very strong and mature despite her young age, as on her little brother Sakari.

Sakari, as revealed only in the last dramatic dialogue between Leena and his mother, was taken from the family by the social services and entrusted to an orphanage. He died years later, forgotten, of an overdose. Leena has always borne remorse with her for not having done enough for her brother, but above all does not forgive her parents for having lost a child like that, almost uninterested in it.

Returning from the hospital, still upset, the woman first inexplicably yells at her daughters, then lashes out at her husband in an irrational impetus that is very similar to the many scenes of violence experienced by a spectator when she was a child. Known as the mother's death, she melts into a liberating cry, returns to herself and embraces her patient and understanding husband and her beloved daughters.

== See also ==
- List of submissions to the 84th Academy Awards for Best Foreign Language Film
- List of Swedish submissions for the Academy Award for Best Foreign Language Film
