= A Song for Martin =

2001 Swedish drama film directed by Bille August

- Poster
- Directed by: Bille August
- Screenplay by: Bille August
- Based on: Boken om E by Ulla Isaksson
- Produced by: Bille August; Lars Kolvig; Michael Obel; Michael Lundberg
- Starring: Sven Wollter; Viveka Seldahl
- Cinematography: Jörgen Persson
- Edited by: Janus Billeskov Jansen
- Music by: Stefan Nilsson
- Production companies: Moonlight Filmproduction; Svenska Filmkompaniet
- Distributed by: Nordisk Film Biografdistribution (Denmark); First Look (USA)
- Release date: 23 March 2001
- Running time: 118 minutes
- Countries: Sweden; Denmark
- Language: Swedish
- Box office: $27,983 (USA)

A Song for Martin (Swedish: En sång för Martin) is a 2001 Swedish drama film directed by Danish Bille August and starring Sven Wollter and Viveka Seldahl. Based on the 1994 autobiographic novel Boken om E (The Book about E) by Swedish author Ulla Isaksson, the film's themes are loss and Alzheimer's disease.

== Plot ==
Martin Fischer is a successful composer. During a rehearsal for an upcoming concert he makes contact with first-violinist Barbara Hartman. During the concert, Barbara and Martin flirt a lot with each other, although they are both married and have adult children. After the concert, they meet out back. She feels ill, and he says that he will follow her home. They stop at his hotel and go inside, kiss, and Barbara says she loves him. Somewhat later, she tells her two adult children that she is going to separate from the children's father. Phillip, the son, becomes very angry, while her daughter Karin is more indulgent. The film jumps to Barbara's honeymoon with Martin in Morocco. After they return home, Martin experiences amnesia, and is diagnosed with Alzheimer's disease.

The doctor says they should try to live as they always have lived. They go to a restaurant, but Martin will have to pay twice, and it destroys the good mood as he feels humiliated. His condition worsens. He is working on an opera, soon to be completed. After working all night, he claims that he is finally finished. He asks Barbara to go to the post office and send the score to his manager. On the way to the post office Barbara opens the envelope to look it through, and she realizes that it's a mess, and that several of the pages are completely blank. Barbara and the manager Biederman agree to pretend that the opera will be performed. Martin and Barbara again go on vacation to Morocco, but Martin is now too affected by the disease. One morning he is gone, and Barbara finds him sitting at a café with no pants on. Later they are out swimming and he forgets how to swim. Barbara grabs him, but he's too heavy for her, he pulls her under the water, but they are saved from drowning by some lifeguards. When they return home to Sweden, they attend Mozart's opera The Magic Flute. Suddenly Martin stands up and begins to sing along. Barbara gets him out of the theater. At night, he gets out of bed, goes to the living room and smashes Barbara's precious violin. She hits him while crying.

Martin basically needs help with everything now. His birthday is celebrated at a restaurant. Martin begins to urinate in a plant, and when Barbara tries to get him to stop, he becomes angry. Eventually he just lies quiet in bed and only reacts when he hears that Barbara opens a box of chocolates. The film ends with Martin's concert with Barbara playing the violin.

== Cast ==
- Sven Wollter as Martin Fischer
- Viveka Seldahl as Barbara Hartman
- Reine Brynolfsson as Biederman
- Linda Källgren as Karin
- Lisa Werlinder as Elisabeth
- Peter Engman as Philip
- Klas Ahlstedt as Erik
- Lo Wahl as Susanne
- Kristina Törnqvist as Dr. Gierlich
- Jonna Ekdahl as Sara

== Reception ==
=== Critical response ===
In his review Roger Ebert gave the film three-and-a-half stars out of four, and described A Song for Martin as an honest film about Alzheimer's disease that "starts at the beginning and goes straight through to the inevitable end, unblinkingly."

The Rotten Tomatoes web site reports that the film received an aggregate 85% positive rating from critics based on 27 reviews.
