= Rojda Sekersöz =

Swedish director (born 1989)

- Born: 25 December 1989 (age 36); Stockholm, Sweden
- Education: Stockholm Academy of Dramatic Arts
- Occupation: Director
- Years active: 2008–present
- Notable work: Young Royals; Beyond Dreams
- Awards: Guldbagge Newcomer Award

Rojda Sekersöz (born 25 December 1989) is a Swedish director. She began her career directing short and independent films, and has since directed multiple television series. She has won various accolades for her work, including the Audience Dragon Award for Best Nordic Film at the Gothenburg Film Festival and the Golden Leaf for Best Film at the Duhok International Film Festival. She also won the Guldbagge Newcomer Award.

Born in Stockholm, Sekersöz studied photography and film at Kulturama. At 19, she became the youngest person ever accepted to the directing programme at the Stockholm Academy of Dramatic Arts. After directing a number of short films, she made her feature film debut with Beyond Dreams (2017), which received critical praise and won several awards. Her second film was My Life as a Comedian, an adaptation of Jonas Gardell's novel of the same name, which premiered in 2019 at the Toronto Film Festival. She is known to international audiences for directing the first two seasons of the Netflix original Young Royals (2021–2022), which won Kristallen Awards for Best Programme and Best Youth Drama. She also directed The New Force (2025) and Will You Care If I Die? (2026).

== Early life ==
She was born 25 December 1989 in Stockholm. Her parents emigrated to Sweden from Turkish Kurdistan in the 1980s. She has a younger sister. Sekersöz grew up speaking both Kurdish and Turkish at home. When she was ten, her family moved from Hallunda to Älvdalen in Dalarna to open a pizza restaurant. She joined Revolutionary Communist Youth at the age of 14. She developed interest in becoming a director after being inspired by Billy Elliot (2000) and The Believer (2001) — both films dealing with class issues and political themes.

== Career ==
=== Education and early works (2008–2016) ===
Sekersöz moved back to Stockholm alone to attend a film program for upper secondary school at Kulturama. She graduated in 2008 having studied photography and film. At the age of 19, she became the youngest person ever accepted to the directing program at the Stockholm Academy of Dramatic Arts. While she was in school, she had a minor acting role, appearing in 7X – Lika barn leka bäst (2010) as Mi. She graduated from the academy in 2012 with the short film Jungfrufärden. The short focused on the history of Sweden during World War II. Some of her other early works were short films, including Selvi ska sova (2011), Fittbacka – ett jävla ungdomshem (2012), and Fast (2015). In 2014, she was awarded the Communist Cultural Scholarship, being recognised as "a young artist who refuses to submit to the norms of careerism and commercialism" (en ung konstnär som vägrar rätta in sig i karriärismens och kommersialismens led). She also performed as a spoken word poet with the Stockholm suburbs-based network Revolution Poetry.

=== Beyond Dreams and My Life as a Comedian (2017–2019) ===
Sekersöz made her feature film directorial debut with Beyond Dreams. Producers Agneta Fagerström and Annika Hellström had approached her for the project on the recommendation of screenwriter Johanna Emanuelsson. Sekersöz and Emanuelsson, both graduates of the Stockholm Academy of Dramatic Arts, were acquainted through Revolutionary Communist Youth. The film premiered at the Gothenburg Film Festival, before its Swedish theatrical release on 17 March 2017. It received praise from critics. Writing for Dagens Nyheter, Helena Lindblad described it as a "brilliant debut film" (lysande debutfilm). The film also won several accolades, including the Church of Sweden's Film Prize, the Audience Dragon Award for Best Nordic Film, and the FIPRESCI Prize at the Norwegian International Film Festival. It won the Golden Leaf for Best Film at the Kurdish Duhok International Film Festival. Sekersöz received a scholarship of 30,000 SEK from the Botkyrka Municipality as a result of Beyond Dreams, as the film primarily took place in its suburb of Alby. She also won the Guldbagge Newcomer Award. Later that year, she directed a stage play titled Skuldsanering.

Her second film was My Life as a Comedian, an adaptation of Jonas Gardell's 1992 novel. The film, which was also written by Gardell, premiered on 11 October 2019 at the Toronto Film Festival. It was generally well-received, with an average rating of 3.7/5 based on 16 critics' reviews. Her direction was praised by Krister Uggeldahl in Hufvudstadsbladet. The film received a more negative review from Helena Lindblad in Dagens Nyheter.

=== Young Royals and other projects (2020–present) ===
In 2020, she co-directed Dejta, an adaptation of the Finnish series Klikkaa mua, with Jens Sjögren. She served as a host for the Swedish radio program Sommar on 27 July 2020. Later that year, it was announced that Sekersöz would be directing a Swedish coming-of-age series for Netflix. Sekersöz described it as being about the honour culture of the upper class, and the extent to which individuals are able to choose the path of their own lives. The series was eventually titled Young Royals; its first season premiered on 1 July 2021 and focuses on the romantic relationship between Prince Wilhelm (Edvin Ryding) and working-class Simon (Omar Rudberg), who is a social outcast at their elite school. On the Swedish review aggregator website Kritiker, the series earned an average rating of 3.3/5 based on 15 critics' reviews. It also won Best Program and Best Youth Drama at Kristallen 2022. The series was renewed, and the second season was, like the first, developed in part by Sekersöz with screenwriter Lisa Ambjörn. It premiered on 1 November 2022 to slightly cooler reception, with 10 reviewers giving it an average rating of 3.0/5. Tariq Raouf of The A.V. Club characterised the second season as less successful than the first, which he attributed to increased narrative focus on secondary straight characters at the expense of the central queer couple.

She directed Ruset, the first Swedish drama series produced specifically for TikTok, which was released in October 2023. Consisting of ten episodes between 2 and 4 minutes in length, the series focused on a secret relationship between two women. It was commissioned by a subsidiary of Systembolaget and designed to raise awareness about alcohol consumption among young people. The production received a negative review from Karolina Fjellborg, who in Aftonbladet described it as an "extremely embarrassing" (oerhört pinsamt) state-sponsored advocacy campaign rather than a creative work. She also argued it had failed to articulate a coherent anti-alcohol message.

Her next project, The New Force, was announced by Netflix in 2024 as a historical drama series focusing on the first female police officers in Sweden. It was based on real events, as the first class of women was admitted to the Swedish Police Academy in 1957 and they began joining patrols the following year. The New Force was created by Sekersöz and Patrik Ehrnst. Sekersöz also co-directed the series with Julia Lindström. It premiered on Netflix on 3 October 2025. It received an average rating of 2.8/5 based on 9 reviews. Several critics felt the subject matter was not handled with enough subtlety to be convincing. Another point of critique was perceived flatness of the male characters and villains.

She directed Will You Care If I Die?, a film adaptation of Nicolas Lunabba's novel of the same name. The film premiered in cinemas on 21 August 2026.

== Personal life ==
She is in a relationship with actor Peshang Rad. In 2019, Sekersöz was one of 250 signatories to a petition urging the Swedish film industry to consider climate change when planning and making media.

== Directing credits ==
=== Film ===
Year	Title	Notes	Ref.
2011	Selvi ska sova	Short film	
2012	Fittbacka – ett jävla ungdomshem	Short film	
2012	Jungfrufärden	Short film	
2015	Fast	Short film	
2017	Beyond Dreams		
2019	My Life as a Comedian		
2026	Will You Care If I Die?		

=== Television ===
Year	Title	Notes	Ref.
2020	Dejta		
2021–2022	Young Royals	Series 1–2	
2023	Ruset		
2025	The New Force		

=== Theatre ===
Year	Title	Venue	Ref.
2017	Skuldsanering	Teatern under bron	

== Awards and nominations ==
Year	Award	Category	Nominee	Result	Ref.
2017	FIPRESCI Award	Best Nordic Film	Beyond Dreams	Won	
2017	Audience Dragon Award	Best Nordic Film	Beyond Dreams	Won	
2017	Angelo Award	Best Film	Beyond Dreams	Won	
2017	Golden Leaf	Best Film	Beyond Dreams	Won	
2018	Guldbagge Newcomer Award	Best Newcomer	Rojda Sekersöz	Won	
