= Gårdinger =

Gårdinger is a Swedish surname. Notable people with the surname include:

- Malte Gårdinger (born 2000), Swedish actor
- Pontus Gårdinger (born 1964), Swedish television host
