= In Bed with Santa =

1999 Swedish comedy film

- Swedish DVD cover
- Directed by: Kjell Sundvall
- Screenplay by: Monica Rolfner
- Produced by: Börje Hansson
- Starring: Katarina Ewerlöf; Peter Haber; Jessica Zandén; Dan Ekborg; Leif André
- Edited by: Thomas Täng
- Distributed by: Sonet Film
- Release date: 26 November 1999 (Sweden)
- Running time: 95 minutes
- Countries: Sweden, Norway, Finland
- Language: Swedish

In Bed with Santa (Swedish: Tomten är far till alla barnen, "Santa is the father to all the children") is a Swedish black comedy film which was released to cinemas in Sweden on 26 November 1999, directed by Kjell Sundvall. A German remake was made in 2007 under the title Messy Christmas. A French remake was made in 2014 under the title Divin Enfant A Finnish remake was made in 2019 under the title Täydellinen joulu.

== Plot ==
Sara invites her ex-husbands and their new families to celebrate Christmas with her and her husband Janne. Sara has always wanted to have a baby with Janne, and at the dinner table she reveals the news: she's pregnant. The only problem is that Janne had a vasectomy two years ago, without Sara knowing it. The secret starts to spread among the guests, and in no time everyone knows but Sara. The party heads for a complete disaster. Who's the real father?

== Cast ==
- Katarina Ewerlöf as Sara
- Peter Haber as Janne
- Jessica Zandén as Rita
- Leif Andrée as Åke
- Nina Gunke as Eva
- Dan Ekborg as Gunnar
- Lena B. Eriksson as Anne
- Anders Ekborg as Thomas
- Inga Ålenius as Signe
- Carl Kjellgren as Erik
- Helena af Sandeberg as Marika
- Alexandra Dahlström as Jeanette
- Stina Rautelin as Helena
- Suzanne Reuter as Carina
- Per Burell as Mats
- Kajsa Ernst as Pauline
- Lamine Dieng as the bus driver
- Ester Sjögren as Elin
- Tin Love Carlsson as Rickard
- Lisa Ambjörn as Johanna
- Sally Frejrud Carlsson as Liselotte
- Viktor Schotte as Daniel
- Molly Larsson as Patricia
- Joel Cronström as Benny
- Jill Johansson as Josefin
- Neshwan Bakhet as Gustav
