= Wilhelm of Sweden =

Wilhelm of Sweden may refer to:

- Prince Wilhelm, Duke of Södermanland (1884–1965), a real-life Swedish prince
- Prince Wilhelm of Sweden, a fictional character from the Netflix series Young Royals
