= The New Force =

2025 Swedish drama television series

- Swedish: Skiftet
- Literally: The Shift
- Genre: Drama
- Created by: Rojda Sekersöz; Patrik Ehrnst
- Screenplay by: Patrik Ehrnst; Antonia Pyk; Elin Randin
- Story by: Patrik Ehrnst; Elin Randin; Per Gavatin
- Directed by: Rojda Sekersöz; Julia Lindström
- Starring: Josefin Asplund; Agnes Rase; Malin Persson
- Country of origin: Sweden
- Original language: Swedish
- No. of seasons: 1
- No. of episodes: 6

Production
- Producer: Cecilia Forsberg Becker
- Production companies: Art & Bob

Original release
- Network: Netflix
- Release: 3 October 2025 – present

The New Force (Swedish: Skiftet, lit. 'The Shift') is a Swedish drama series created by Patrik Ehrnst and Rojda Sekersöz. Set in 1958, it follows a trio of Sweden's first female police officers (Josefin Asplund, Agnes Rase, Malin Persson) as they patrol in Klara, Stockholm. The series was filmed in Norrköping, and produced by Cecilia Forsberg Becker from Art & Bob. It was the first Swedish period drama produced for Netflix. The New Force premiered on Netflix on 3 October 2025 and received mixed to negative reviews from critics.

== Cast ==
- Agnes Rase as Siv Morell: female constable with ambitions of becoming a detective
- Josefin Asplund as Carin Eriksson: female constable with a strong protective instinct for women; left home to flee her abusive father
- Malin Persson as Ingrid Gustafsson: female constable who hides her Jewish heritage
- Christopher Wagelin as Johan Reimer: constable assigned patrol with Carin
- Hannes Fohlin as Oscar Thornberg: police detective who forms a connection with Siv
- Rasmus Luthander as Arne Grahn: Carin's upper-class boyfriend
- Jimmy Lindström as Wallin: constable assigned patrol with Ingrid
- Cilla Thorell as Jenny Berg: an established police sister in the Klara precinct; oversees the female officers
- Pablo Leiva Wenger as Rossi: constable assigned patrol with Siv
- Peter Eriksson as Gunnar Svärd: district chief of the Klara precinct; initiated the female constable experiment in hopes of earning a promotion
- Dominik Henzel as Carl Gustaf Fischer: police detective; works with Oscar and disapproves of women in the police
- Leonard Terfelt as Jack Hellman: brothel owner

== Episodes ==
No.	Title	Directed by	Written by	Original release date
1	"Are You Real Police Officers?" (Är ni poliser på riktigt?)	Rojda Sekersöz	Patrik Ehrnst	3 October 2025
In 1958, the first female police officers report to work in Klara, Stockholm, under the supervision of Police Sister Berg. Each is assigned a male constable to patrol with, but tensions arise immediately. Ingrid’s partner Wallin refuses to acknowledge her, while Siv’s partner Rossi falsely blames her for failing to search a suspect. Carin drops her new badge in a scuffle with Monica, a prostitute, and follows her to her brothel run by the menacing Jack. Jack takes Carin to see her, and finds Monica bleeding and distressed. Suspicious, Jack throws Carin out. Siv brings Ingrid to a bar frequented by their male colleagues, where they are largely ignored—except by Oscar, a detective who shows interest in Siv. Arne comforts Carin when she gets home. They see her picture in the paper as the cover girl of the female police pilot program. Carin is about to confess to losing her badge, when her partner Reimer reveals he has had it all along. Carin and Reimer are called to a riverbank where a body has been discovered — Monica. Carin is devastated and suspects Jack killed her, but her concerns are dismissed by the detectives.
2	"Miss Sweden" (Fröken Sverige)	Rojda Sekersöz	Patrik Ehrnst	3 October 2025
Sister Berg talks Ingrid out of reporting Wallin for excessive force. Oscar offers to help Siv learn the ropes as a detective, but Rossi suspects he has ulterior motives. Carin and Siv pose as potential tenants to view Monica’s room, and Carin pockets Monica’s datebook. Power-hungry District Chief Svärd is concerned about the number of women who have already quit the police, and how it will reflect on his reputation. Carin begins a solo, unauthorized investigation into Monica’s death, asking her friend Katina, another prostitute, to make inquiries around the brothel. Siv is mocked with the moniker of “Miss Sweden.” Wanting to impress Oscar, she tells him about the brothel, using Carin’s story about losing her badge as her own. Arne and Carin argue about him hiding the relationship from his upper-class, traditional mother. Carin reads a letter from her mother begging her to get back in touch. The police raid the brothel Siv reported, leading to Katina’s arrest. Jack gets away, but the detectives identify him as the owner. Oscar finds out that it was really Carin’s investigation that uncovered the brothel. Jack, now on the run, is angry with Svärd for failing to prevent the raid.
3	"Stop or I'll Shoot!" (Stanna, annars skjuter jag!)	Rojda Sekersöz	Patrik Ehrnst	3 October 2025
Carin fears she may be pregnant, and books a test. She also becomes insecure after learning Arne proposed to his ex-girlfriend after only three weeks. Arne introduces her to his mother. She treats Carin coldly, but Arne stands up for her and they leave together. Ingrid visits her Jewish grandmother at the nursing home (who owns the apartment the girls share). She expresses fear about people finding out about her heritage, and encourages Ingrid to keep it a secret. In pursuit of a suspect, Ingrid pulls out her gun and shouts at him to stop. Wallin is impressed, finally breaking the ice between them. Katina, on the run from Jack, shows up at the girls’ apartment, creating conflict as Siv fears losing her job. Katina and Carin are attacked later by one of Jack’s goons. She is forced into a car, threatened, and nearly strangled by Jack. He declares she is now responsible for Katina’s debt, and gives her two days to come up with 15,000 SEK.
4	"No Complaints" (Ni behandlas väl och har inga klagomål)	Julia Lindström	Patrik Ehrnst	3 October 2025
Carin’s mother turns up at her work. They talk, but Carin is dismayed to learn that her mother still cannot accept she is a victim of abuse. After a man slips his cuffs, Siv tackles him and makes the arrest. The male offers nearby whistle and express approval, while Rossi feels emasculated. She goes on a date with Oscar. The police superintendent Thulin interviews the officers, both men and women, to assess how the pilot experiment has gone. The women are coached to report that everything is fine. Carin tells Arne her mother is sick and needs money to leave her husband. Believing the lie, he offers her a loan. Wallin takes Ingrid shooting in a field. Rossi pastes Siv’s head on pictures of naked models and posts them around the office. She is humiliated. Oscar comforts her, and the two share a kiss. Arne arrives to Carin’s apartment to pick her up for their dinner date, but instead runs into Jack, who demands the money and attacks him. Policemen come upon the scene and arrest Jack. Arne figures out Carin’s lie and tells her to leave.
5	"The Salon" (Salong Solveig)	Julia Lindström	Patrik Ehrnst	3 October 2025
Ingrid tells Carin she can’t stay at the apartment if she will be putting them all in danger. Carin finds out that Svärd was the one who closed the case of Monica’s death. On patrol, Ingrid and Wallin happen upon a man putting up posters for the Communist Labor League. The detectives interrogate Jack, but he gives them nothing. Ingrid has a wild night after Wallin invites her out drinking. Arne gives a statement to police about Jack’s assault. Siv sleeps with Oscar. Wallin takes her to an abandoned building, where he and other officers have tied up the “commie” who was putting up posters. They egg Ingrid on to participate in the beating. Ingrid is disgusted with herself and visits her grandmother, who encourages her to do the right thing. While shopping for a gift for Oscar, she sees him from afar with his wife and children. The girls commiserate, make up, and get drunk together. Carin visits an abortionist to steal her appointment book, where she confirms Monica had the procedure. She calls the listed emergency contact number, and Svärd answers the phone.
6	"Is This How It Works?" (Är det så här det fungerar?)	Julia Lindström	Patrik Ehrnst	3 October 2025
Svärd tells Carin that as cover girl she must come with them to police headquarters to help advocate for the program’s continuation. She confides in Reimer about her suspicion of Svärd. They report both an illegal abortion clinic and Svärd’s possible connection with Monica to Fischer. Siv rebuffs Oscar. Carin tells Arne she will quit the police and they reunite. Fischer confronts Svärd, saying he now owes him a favor. Ingrid tells Sister Berg about Wallin’s illegal beatings. She wants to go undercover and continue gathering information against him. Rossi apologizes to Siv. The abortionist implicates Svärd in Monica’s murder by saying he picked her up from the abortion. Carin accuses him in the meeting with the police commissioner. Monica was in fact his daughter, and he was driving her to the hospital when she bled out in the backseat. The commissioner tells Carin to be quiet about it or the program will be cancelled. She considers quitting to have a family with Arne, but in the end she choses the police, and Arne breaks up with her. Carin gets a positive pregnancy test result. The pilot program is extended, but Fischer replaces Svärd as district chief.

== Production ==
Netflix announced the series on 18 March 2024, providing the Swedish title and stating it would be set in 1958, following the first female police officers in Sweden. They also announced that Rojda Sekersöz, who directed Young Royals, would be directing the series. By August of that year, additional details were provided, including the release date, cast, and crew. It was announced that Josefin Asplund, Agnes Rase, and Malin Persson would be playing the lead roles. The New Force was the first Swedish period drama created for Netflix.

The New Force was based on real events; the first class of women was admitted to the Swedish Police Academy in 1957 and they began joining patrols the following year. The series was created by Patrik Ehrnst and Sekersöz. Sekersöz served as conceptual director the series as a whole, and co-directed the series with Julia Lindström. Ehrnst, Antonia Pyk and Elin Randin wrote the script, while the story was developed by Ehrnst, Randin, and Per Gavatin. The series was filmed in Norrköping, and produced by Cecilia Forsberg Becker from Art & Bob.

== Release ==
It premiered on Netflix on 3 October 2025.

== Reception ==
The film earned an average rating of 2.8/5 on the Swedish review aggregator site Kritiker. Thomas Engström gave The New Force 4/6 stars in Svenska Dagbladet. Karolina Fjellborg gave it a mixed review in Aftonbladet. She criticized the unsubtle handling of the subject matter and flat male characters, but praised the performances, costume design, and cinematography. She concluded that, overall, the series was "clichéd but worth watching." The aesthetics and hip-hop soundtrack were both praised by Mattias Bergqvist in Expressen. Although he gave the series a mixed review overall, he commended the lead actresses for "capturing the characters' friendship, willpower, and ambition."

Fredrik Sahlin was more critical in Dagens Nyheter, writing that "with friends like [the series], feminism needs no enemies." Ingvill Dybfest Dahl also gave it a generally negative review in NRK. She said it was "audiovisual interesting journey" with good acting, but concluded that the caricatured villains and dramatic flatness resulted in an "uneven mess."
