= Stora Sundby Castle =

Castle in Sweden

- Eskilstuna Municipality, Södermanland County, Sweden
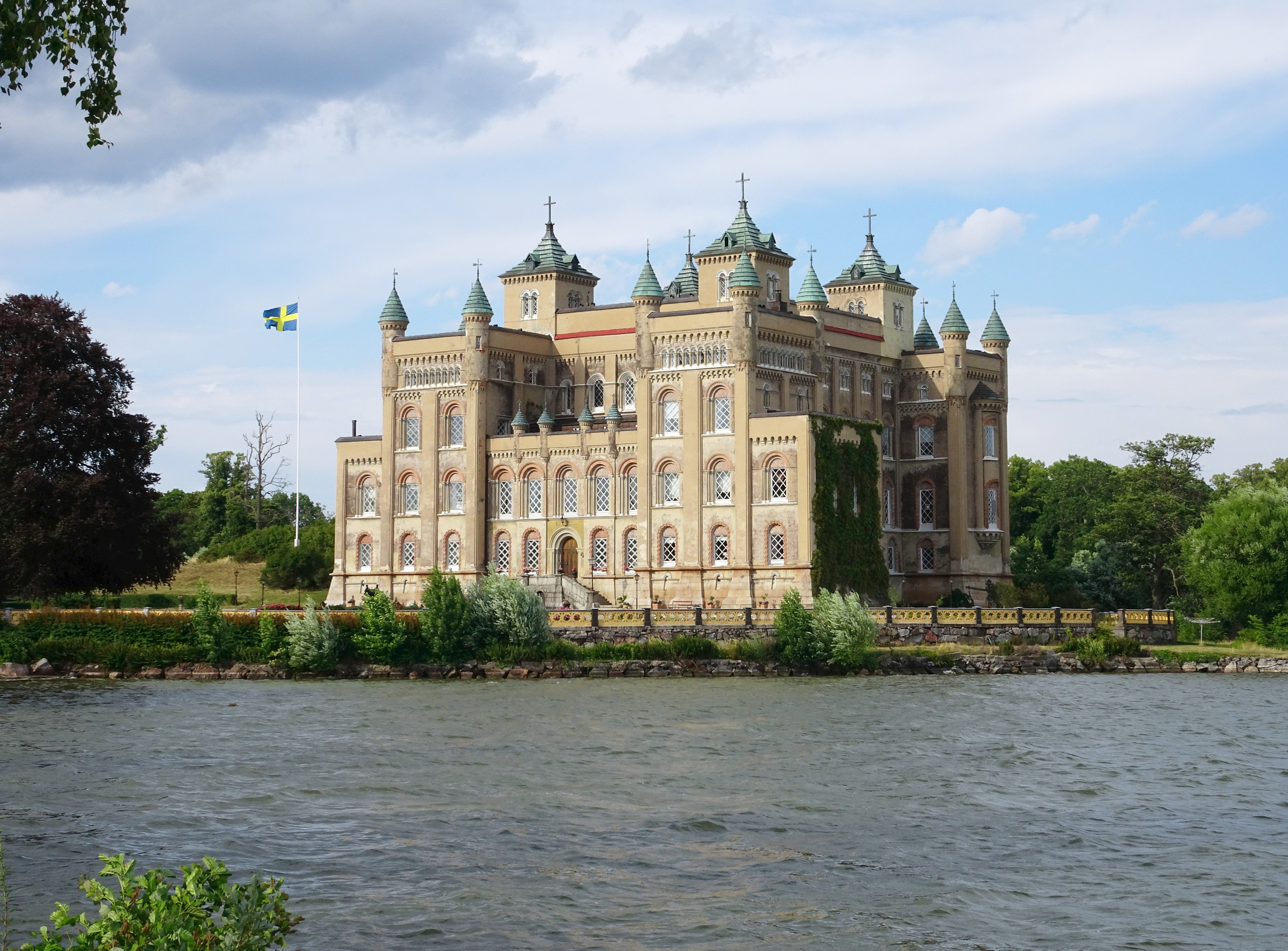
- Stora Sundby in 2013

Site information
- Type: Castle

Location
- Coordinates: 59°16′13″N 16°07′35″E

Stora Sundby Castle (Swedish: Stora Sundby slott) is a castle in Eskilstuna Municipality, Södermanland County, Sweden. The architectural features of the castle resemble those of a calendar, four large towers symbolizing the seasons, twelve small towers symbolizing the months of the year, 52 rooms symbolizing the weeks of the year, and a window for each day of the year (365). The architect was Peter Frederick Robinson.

The castle was used as the filming location for The Royal Palace in the Swedish teen drama Young Royals.

== Gallery ==
Main building

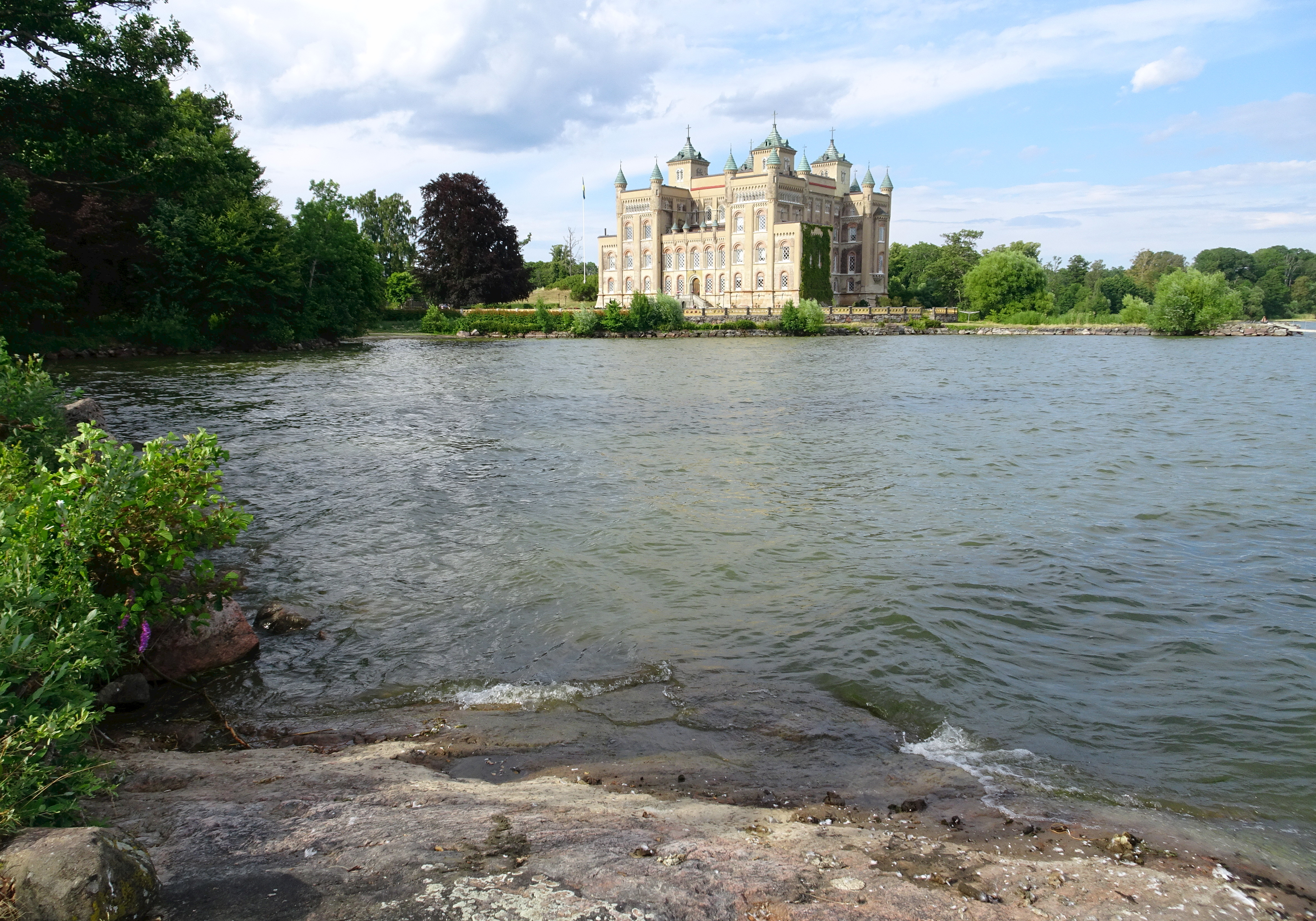

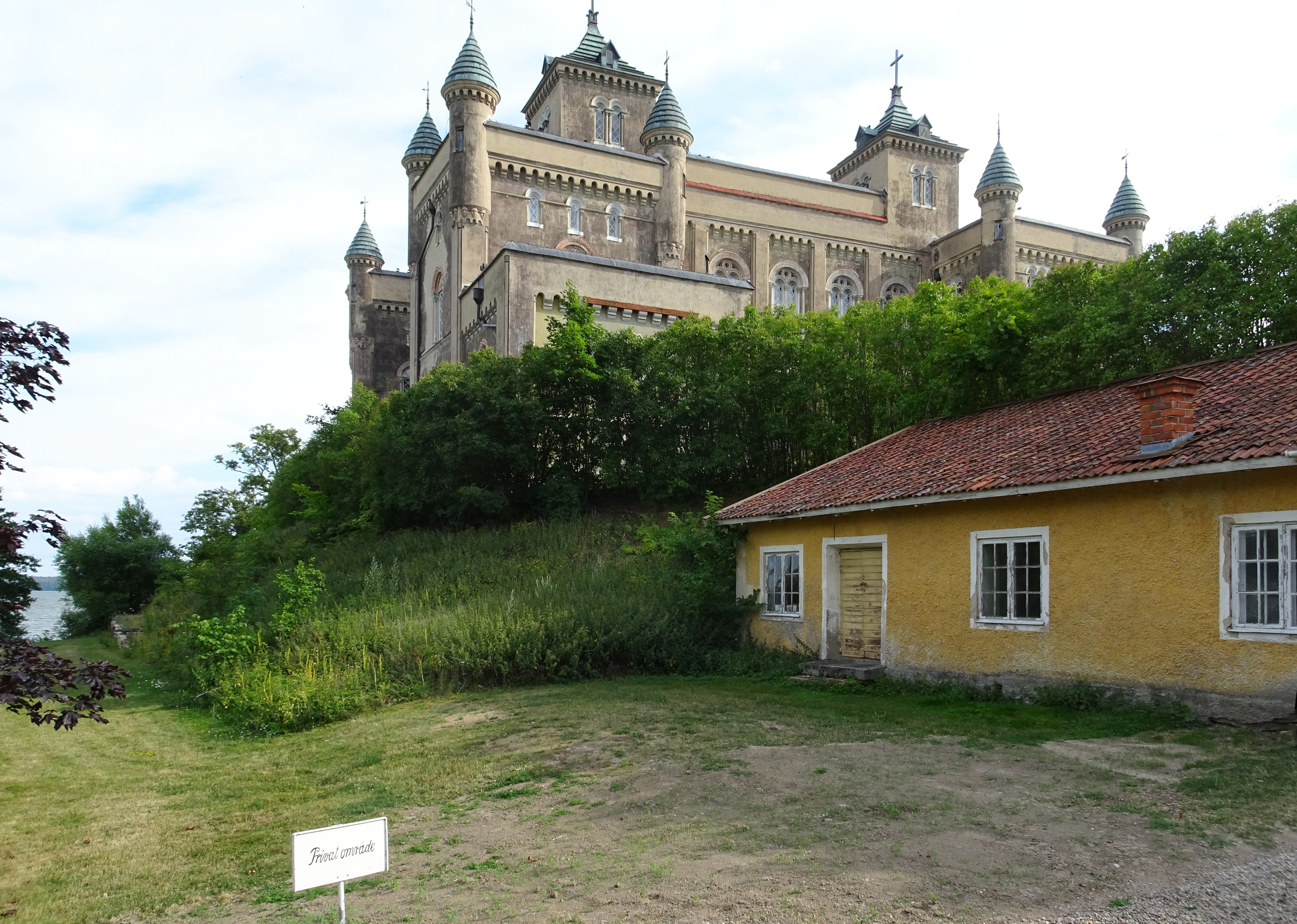

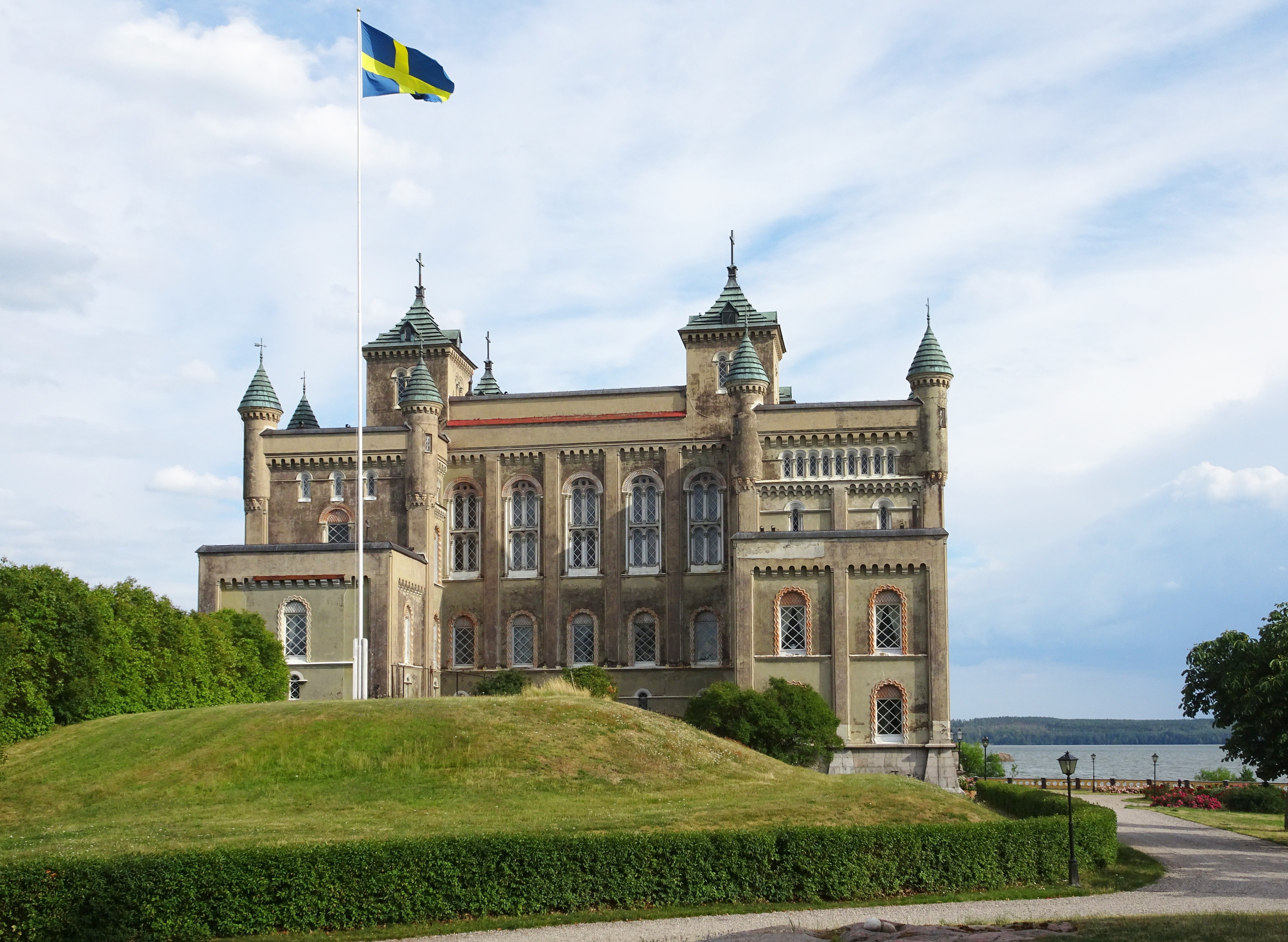

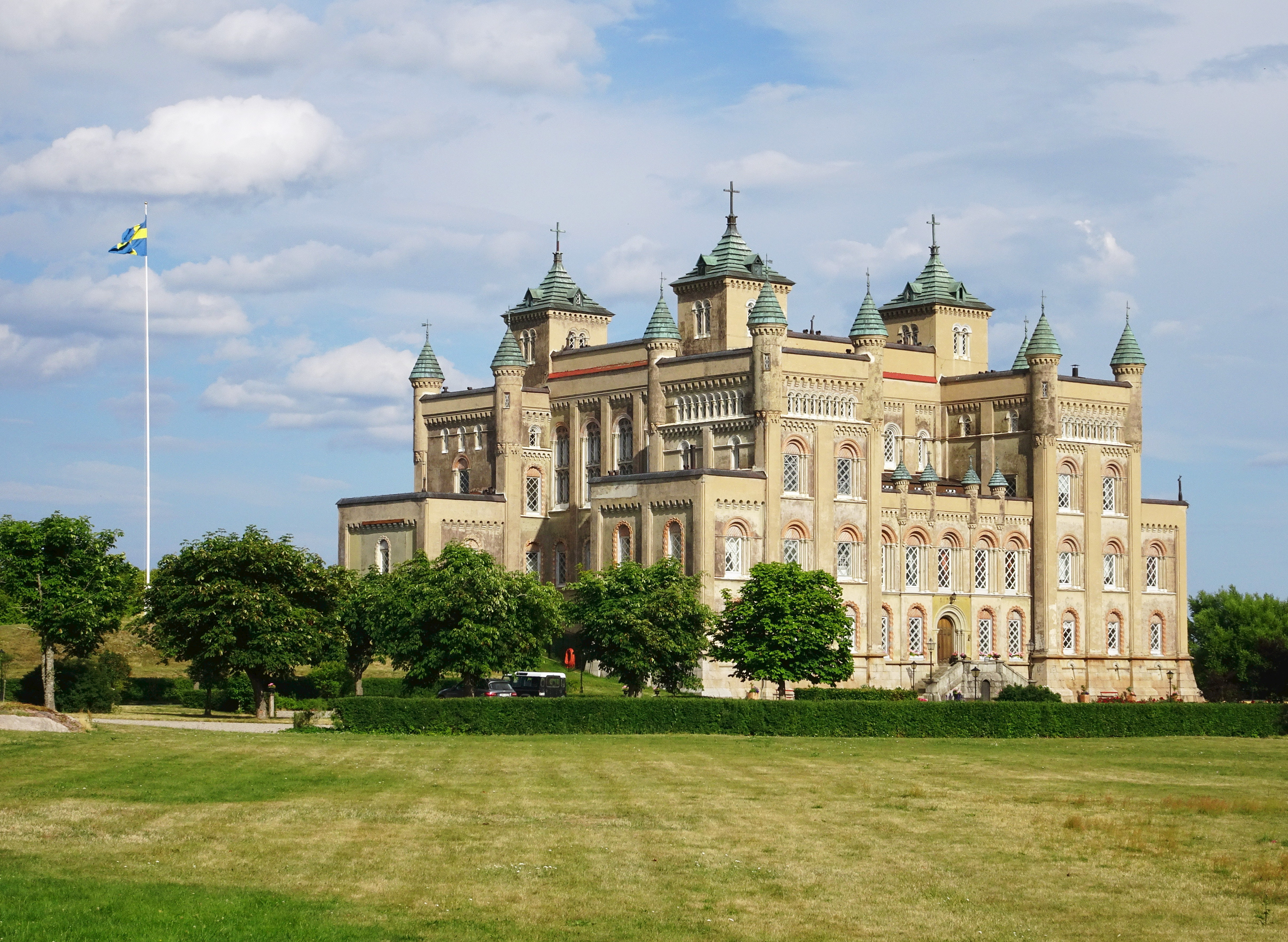
Facade details

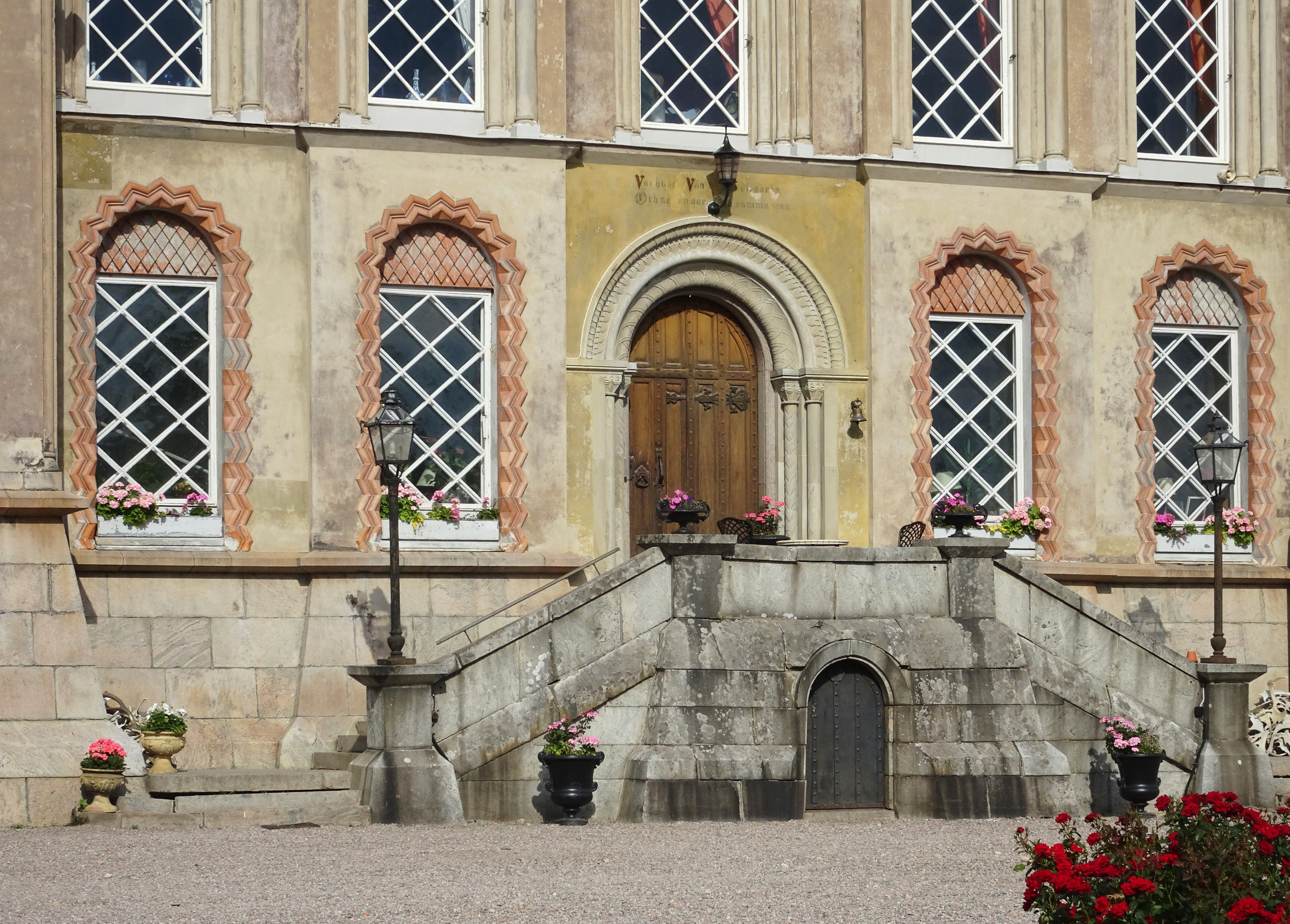

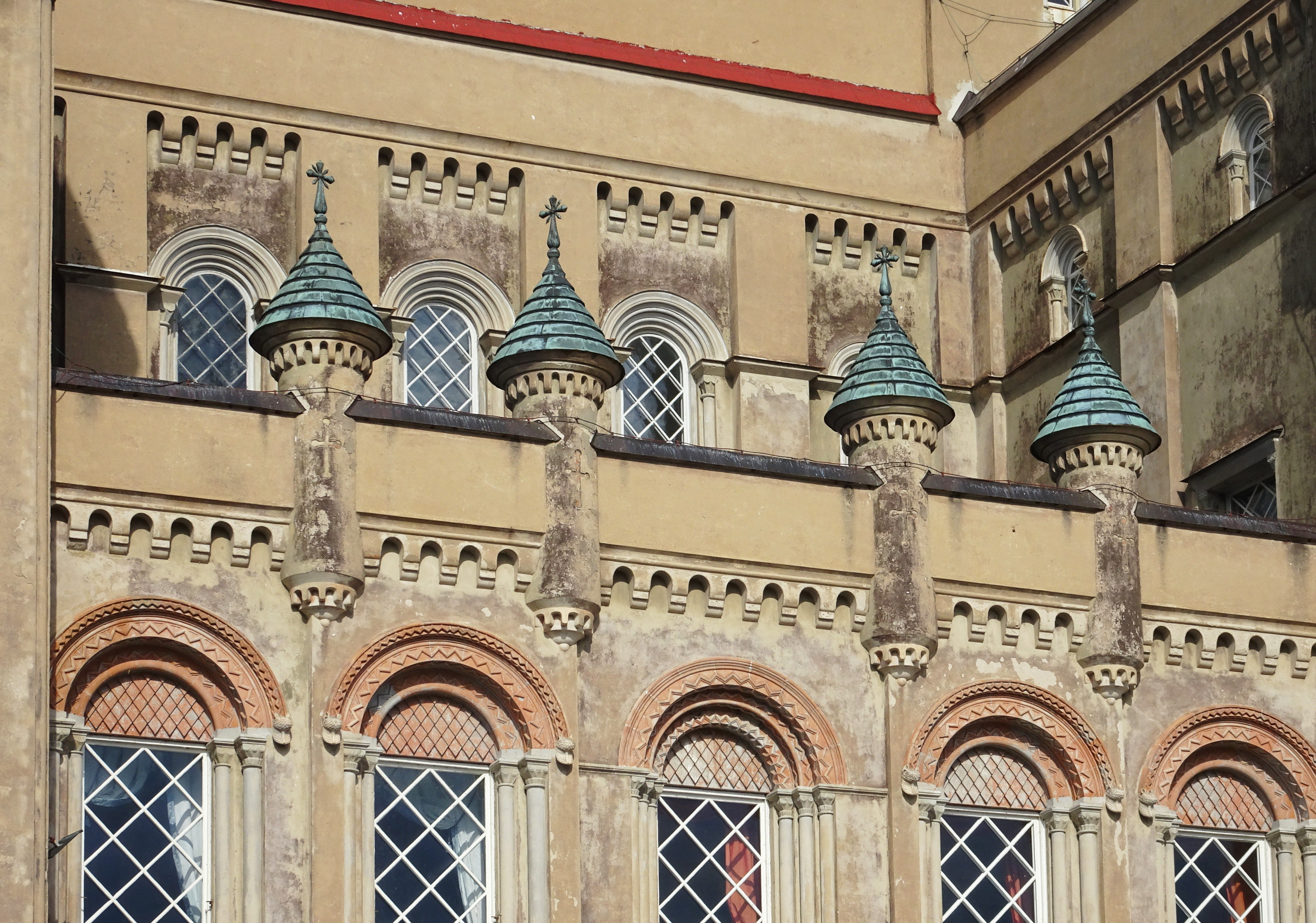

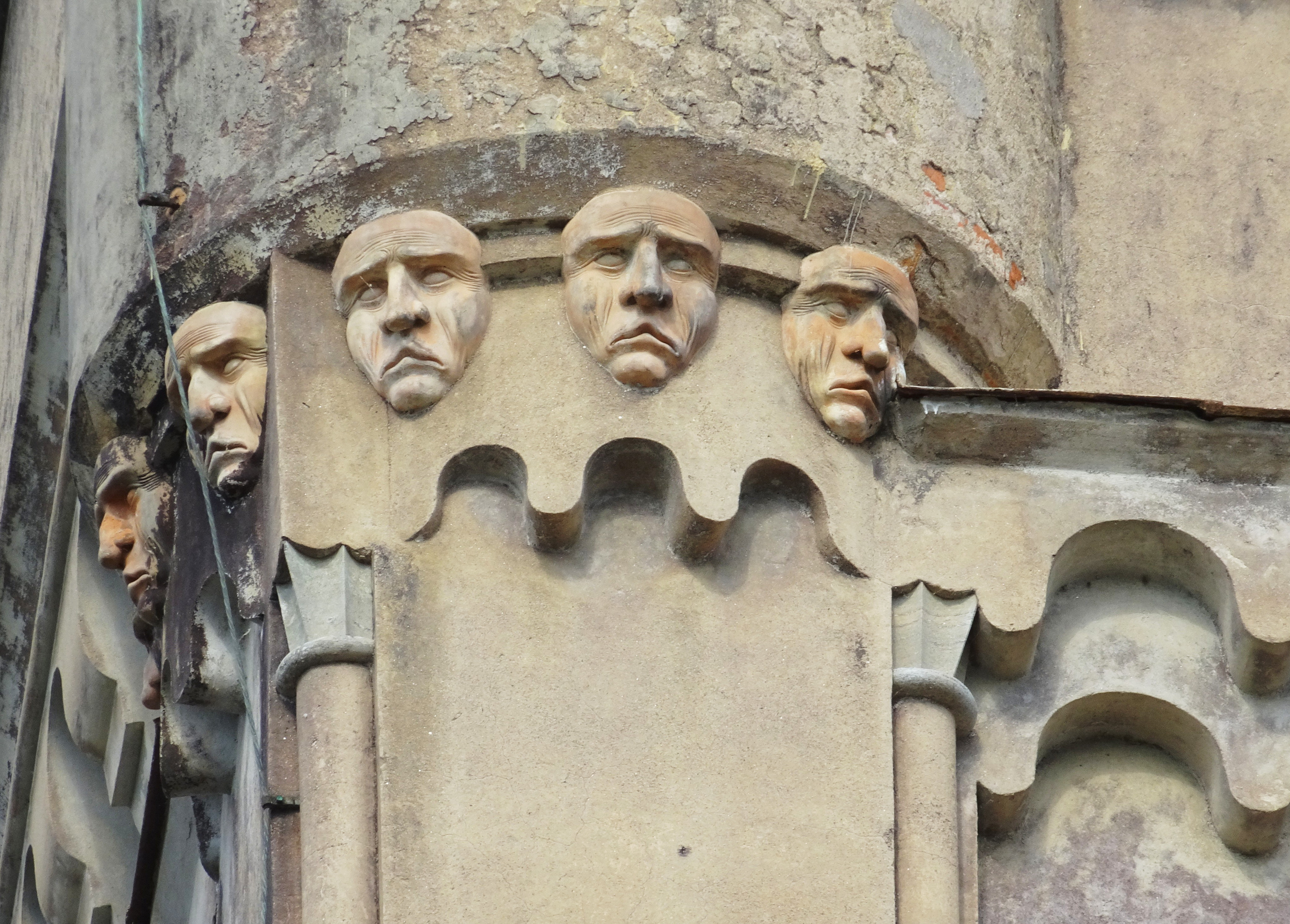

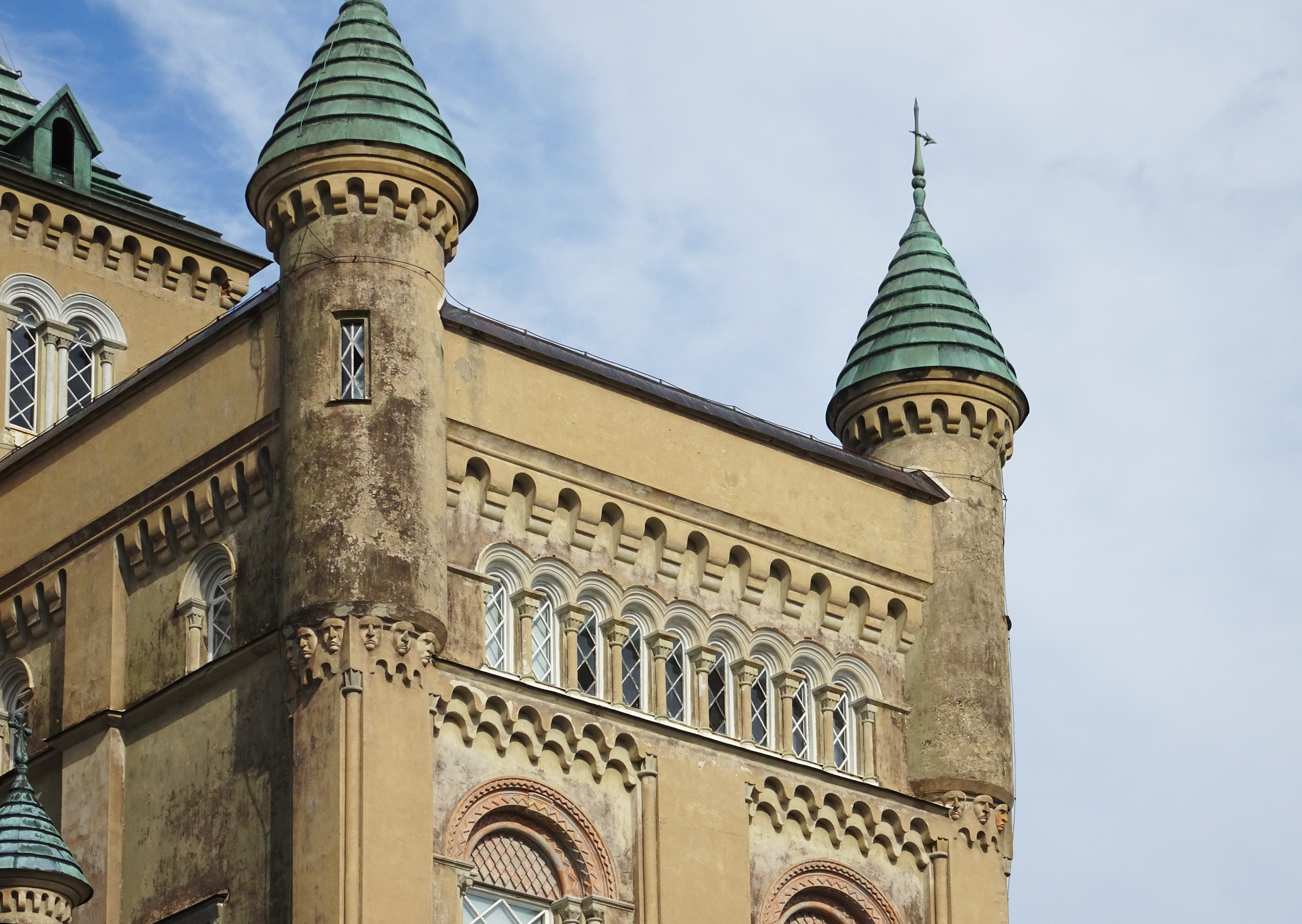

== See also ==
- List of castles in Sweden
