= En komikers uppväxt =

1992 novel by Jonas Gardell

- Author: Jonas Gardell
- Language: Swedish
- Set in: fictional Stockholm suburb of Sävbyholm, Sweden
- Published: 1992
- Publisher: Nordstedts
- Publication place: Sweden

En komikers uppväxt is a 1992 novel by Swedish writer Jonas Gardell. Loosely based on his own upbringing, the novel portrays a boy, Juha, struggling with acceptance and belonging in suburban Stockholm. Juha is torn between loyalty to his old friends, the outcast kids Jenny and Thomas, and wanting to be one of the cool kids and get the popular girls.

The novel was the basis of a 1992 Swedish TV miniseries in three parts, also called En komikers uppväxt.

On 13 April 2000, the book was given as a gift from the National Agency for Education, Svenska förläggareföreningen and Månpocket to all eighth-grade pupils in Sweden before the World Book Day, which occurred on 23 April, but the giving was done earlier because of Easter.

Recently, Gardell adapted his novel into a screenplay for a feature film (English title: My Life as a Comedian), which had its world premiere on 6 September 2019 at the 2019 Toronto International Film Festival. The film, directed by Rojda Sekersöz, is set in two time frames, the 1970s and the 2010s (whereas the novel was set in the 1970s from the perspective of the 1990s). The movie highlights the racism and xenophobia of 1970s suburban Sweden as it emphasizes the foreign background of the three outcast kids: Jenny is played by a Chinese-Swedish girl, Thomas's mother is portrayed as German with a heavy accent and at one point girls are throwing Hitler salutes at her, and Juha's mother is Finnish as in all other versions.
