= Messy Christmas =

2007 German comedy film

- Directed by: Vanessa Jopp
- Written by: Monika Rolfner
- Produced by: Manuela Stehr
- Starring: Martina Gedeck; Heino Ferch
- Cinematography: Hans Fromm
- Edited by: Brigitta Tauchner
- Music by: Loy Wesselburg
- Distributed by: X Verleih AG (through Warner Bros.)
- Release date: 25 October 2007 (HIFF)
- Running time: 96 minutes
- Country: Germany
- Language: German

Messy Christmas (German: Meine schöne Bescherung) is a 2007 German comedy film directed by Vanessa Jopp.

== Cast and characters ==
- Martina Gedeck as Sara Meinhold
- Heino Ferch as Jan Meinhold
- Roeland Wiesnekker as Andi
- Jasmin Tabatabai as Rita
- Andreas Windhuis as Gunnar
- Rosa Enskat as Eva
- Rainer Sellien as Erich
- Meret Becker as Pauline
- Matthias Matschke as Thomas
- Ursula Doll as Anne
- Alexandra Neldel as Isabell

== See also ==
- List of Christmas films
- In Bed with Santa (1999)
- Divin Enfant (2014)
