= Lisa Ambjörn =

Swedish screenwriter

- Born: 1989 (age 36–37); Stockholm, Sweden
- Education: Stockholm Academy of Dramatic Arts
- Years active: 2018-
- Website: https://www.lisaambjorn.com/

Lisa Ambjörn (born 1989) is a Swedish screenwriter, executive producer and showrunner. She is known for her work as the creator and writer of Sjukt (2021) and as a co-creator, lead writer, and executive producer for the Netflix teen drama Young Royals (2021–2024).

== Early life ==
Ambjörn participated in youth theatre groups as a child where she learned to write plays, film short-films, and perform. When she was 23, she moved to London, England where she acted in the theatre group Unga Turteatern, until she realized acting was not for her. She soon found work as a film editor and worked on several international documentaries.

Unable to find inspiration in her work, she decided to move back home and enroll in a foundations of script writing course at the Nordic high school Biskops Arnö. When she'd finished her course, she applied for the Stockholm Academy of Dramatic Arts to pursue a career in screenwriting. In 2018, she graduated and went onto complete a bachelor's degree while completing a six-week internship at the Swedish television company SVT. For her graduation project Ambjörn wrote the short-film Banana Pancake Trail (2018).

== Career ==
Ambjörn's professional screenwriting debut was at SVT, where she had been hired as a writer for the Swedish comedy Andra Åket (2019), and a writer and script editor for the sci-fi Swedish-Finnish show White Wall (2020). Ambjörn earned her first headwriting job on the coming-of-age drama series Sommaren 85 (2020).

=== Sjukt ===
In April 2021, Ambjörn had created and wrote the black-comedy television show Sjukt through Nexiko Productions, which was broadcast on SVT. The show follows a young women named Alice and her experiences with cervical cancer, which was based loosely on Ambjörn's own life. The show was praised for its comedic tone towards cancer, which made it seem refreshing and witty. The show broadcast in the UK through the distributor Videoplugger and in Australia on SBS. Sjukt was nominated for Comedy of the Year for the 2021 Childhood Cancer Gala.

=== Young Royals ===
In July 2021, Ambjörn was credited as a co-creator and lead writer for first season of the Netflix teen drama Young Royals (2021–2024). Ambjörn was contacted to do several interviews as the primary creator and writer for the show's run.

The series was met with immediate success across 12 countries, being streamed for more than 9.8 million hours worldwide. The show was praised by Forbes and Refinery29 for its realistic teenage cast and well written qualities. This led the show to be renewed for a second season which released in November 2022. The second season made it to the top 10 in 26 countries and was streamed more than 18 million hours in the first week.

During the third season's production, Ambjörn joined the European Showrunner program, a part of the International Film School of Köln, in order to develop her skills as an exclusive producer. The third season's first five episodes released in March 2024. The series made it to the top 10 in 47 countries and was streamed more than 11.5 million hours by its first week. The finale and behind-the-scenes documentary Young Royals Forever were streamed for over 7.5 million hours.

By the show's end, it had been praised by Variety, the Los Angeles Times, and Teen Vogue. Several LGBTQ+ internet outlets had covered the show, which includes the Queerty, Out, and Into. The show was nominated and won several awards including several Kristallens.

In May 2024, Ambjörn signed with the United Talent Agency.

== Personal life ==
Ambjörn is a survivor of cervical cancer.

== Filmography ==
=== Films ===
Year	Title	Role	Notes	Source
1999	In Bed with Santa	Johanna	Feature film	
2018	Banana Pancake Trail	Writer	Short-film	
2024	Young Royals Forever	Self	Documentary	

=== Television credits ===
Year	Title	Creator	Writer	Executive Producer	Notes	Source
2019	Andra Åket	No	Yes	No	Season 2, Episode 2 "Innan vi dör"	
2020	White Wall	No	Yes	No	Also script editor	
2020	Sommaren 85	No	Yes	No		
2021	Sjukt	Yes	Yes	No		
2021–2024	Young Royals	Yes	Yes	Yes (Note: Executive producer for season 3 only)	Cameo in Season 3, Episode 5	

== Awards and nominations ==
Award	Year	Work	Category	Result	Source
Comedy of the Year	2021	Sjukt	The Swedish Humor Prize	Nominated	
Kristallen	2022	Young Royals	Best Youth Drama	Won	
Kristallen	2022	Young Royals	Best Program	Won	
Kristallen	2022	Young Royals	Viewers Favourite Program	Nominated	
Kristallen	2023	Young Royals	Best Youth Drama	Nominated	
Kristallen	2023	Young Royals	Viewers Favourite Program	Nominated	
Gaygalan Awards	2022	Young Royals	TV Show of the Year	Won	
Gaygalan Awards	2023	Young Royals	TV Show of the Year	Won	
Riagalan	2022	Young Royals	Original Idea of the Year (Scripted)	Won	
The Queerties	2023	Young Royals	TV Drama	Nominated	
The Queerties	2024	Young Royals	Next Big Thing	Won	
The Dorian TV Awards	2023	Young Royals	Best Non-English Language TV Show	Nominated	
The Dorian TV Awards	2024	Young Royals	Best Non-English Language TV Show	Nominated	
The Dorian TV Awards	2024	Young Royals	Best LGBTQ Non-English TV Show	Won	
