= Miljonärerna =

Swedish television series

Miljonärerna (The Millionaires) was a Swedish reality show that was broadcast on Kanal5 in 2006. The show was cancelled after half the series had aired due to low viewership. The rest of the episodes were to be aired sometime during 2007 on Kanal5.

The show's plot was that 20 contestants should be together, the twist being that it was good to be eliminated as soon as possible. There were 10 contestants who in the end would leave the show with one million Swedish krona each.

The host was Pontus Gårdinger.
