= Divin Enfant =

- French release poster
- Directed by: Olivier Doran
- Written by: Olivier Doran; Patrick Lefèbvre
- Produced by: Christine Gozlan; Nicolas Steil
- Starring: Émilie Dequenne; Sami Bouajila; Géraldine Pailhas
- Cinematography: Philippe Guilbert
- Edited by: Emmanuelle Baude
- Music by: André Dziezuk
- Production companies: Thelma Films; TF1 Films Production; Iris Productions
- Distributed by: UGC Distribution
- Release date: 15 January 2014 (France)
- Running time: 85 minutes
- Countries: France; Luxembourg; Belgium
- Language: French
- Budget: $4.3 million
- Box office: $265.000

Divin Enfant (Merry Christmess!) is a 2014 French comedy film directed by Olivier Doran and starring Émilie Dequenne, Sami Bouajila and Géraldine Pailhas.

== Cast ==
- Sami Bouajila as Jean
- Géraldine Pailhas as Pauline
- Linh Dan Pham as Marie
- Émilie Dequenne as Sarah
- Guillaume de Tonquédec as Éric
- India Hair as Sophie
- Natacha Lindinger as Elisabeth
- Pascal Demolon as Xavier
- Marco Prince as Thomas

== See also ==
- List of Christmas films
- In Bed with Santa (1999)
- Messy Christmas (2007)
