= Emma Broomé =

Swedish actress

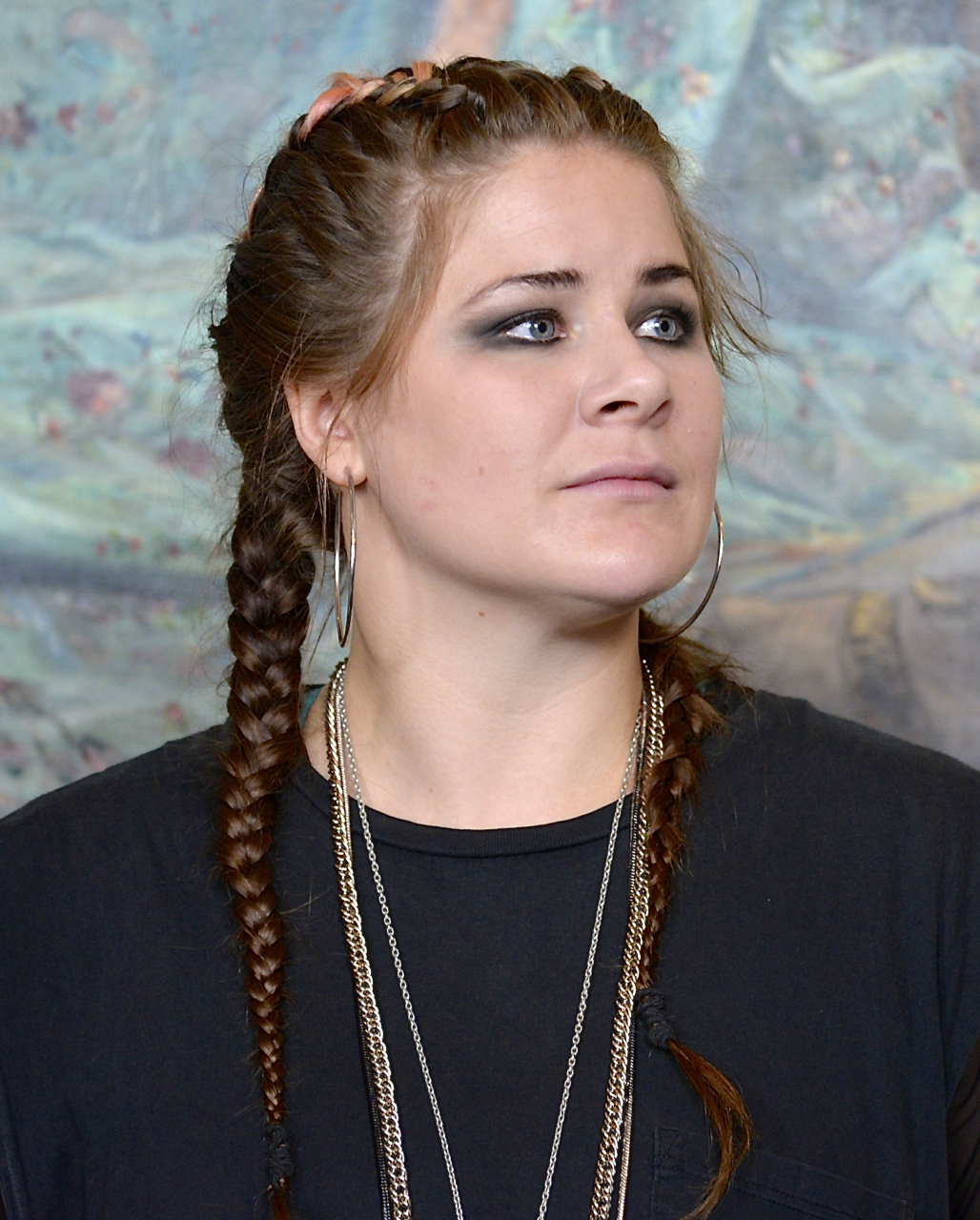
- Emma Broomé in 2014
- Born: 13 June 1985 (age 40); Bollnäs, Sweden
- Occupation: Actress

Emma Maria Isabelle Broomé (born 13 June 1985) is a Swedish actress. She is best known for her leading role as Åsa in the 2020 SVT series Sommaren 85.

She studied at the Stockholm Academy of Dramatic Arts between 2009 and 2012, and has since then been working at the Royal Dramatic Theatre.
