= Guldbagge Newcomer Award =

Swedish film award

- Country: Sweden
- Presented by: Swedish Film Institute
- First award: 2015
- Currently held by: Loran Batti for G-21 Scenes from Gottsunda (2024)
- Website: guldbaggen.se

The Guldbagge Newcomer Award, instituted in 2015 for the 51st Guldbagge Awards, is a Newcomer Award presented annually by the Swedish Film Institute (SFI) as part of the Guldbagge Awards (Swedish: "Guldbaggen") to people working in the Swedish motion picture industry.

== Recipients ==
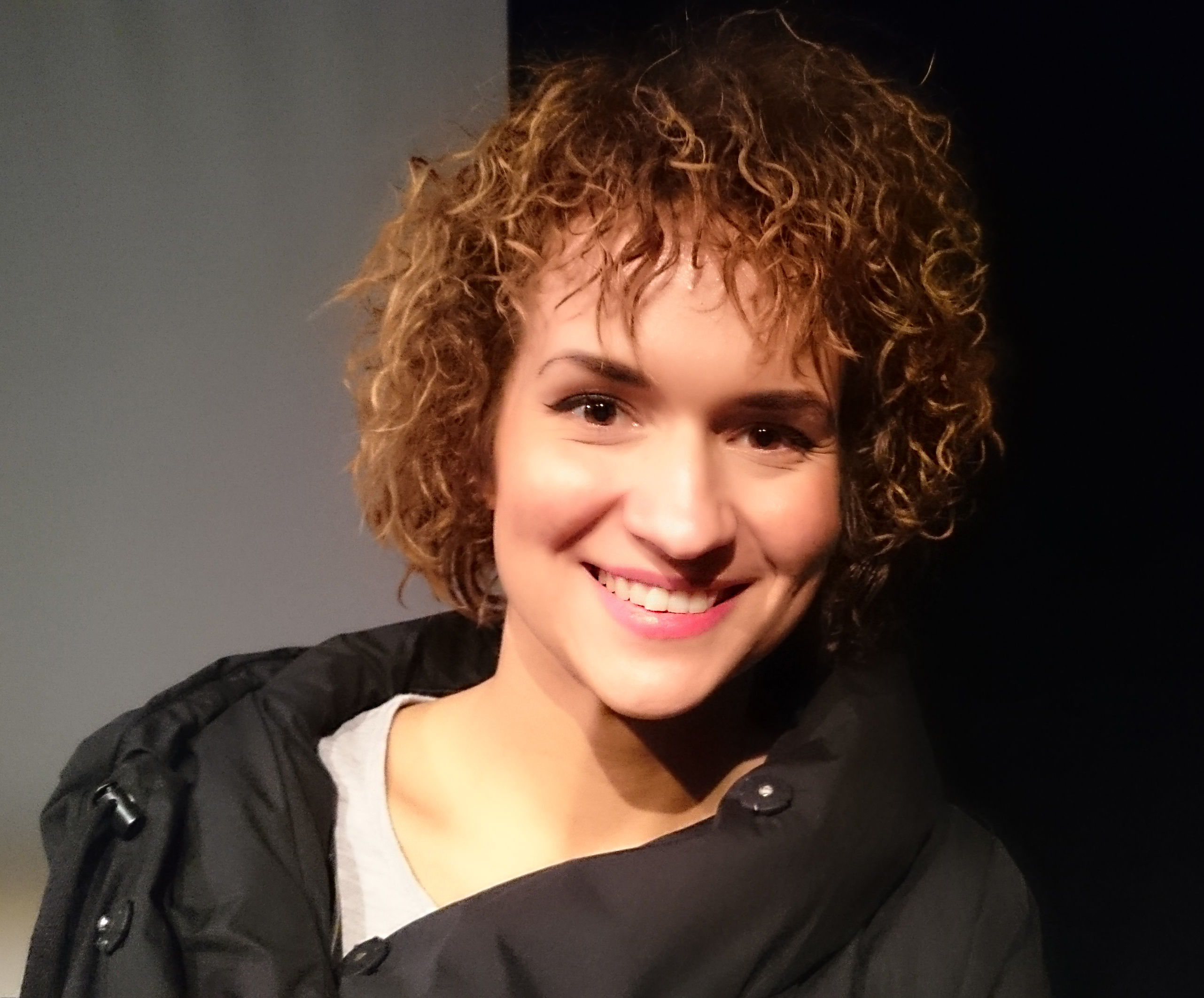
Bianca Kronlöf received the first Newcomer Award at the 51st Guldbagge Awards.

=== 2010s ===
Year	Recipient	Profession	Ref.
2015 (51st)	Bianca Kronlöf	Actress, comedian, screenwriter and illustrator	
2016 (52nd)	Ahang Bashi	Film director	
2017 (53rd)	Rojda Sekersöz	Film director and actress	
2018 (54th)	Crazy Pictures	Film Collective	
2019 (55th)	Emily Norling	Film director	

=== 2020s ===
Year	Recipient	Profession	Ref.
2020 (56th)	— (no award given)	— (no award given)	
2024 (60th)	Loran Batti – G-21 Scenes from Gottsunda	Documentary filmmaker	

== See also ==
- Guldbagge Awards
- Guldbagge Honorary Award
