= Katarina Ewerlöf =

Swedish actress

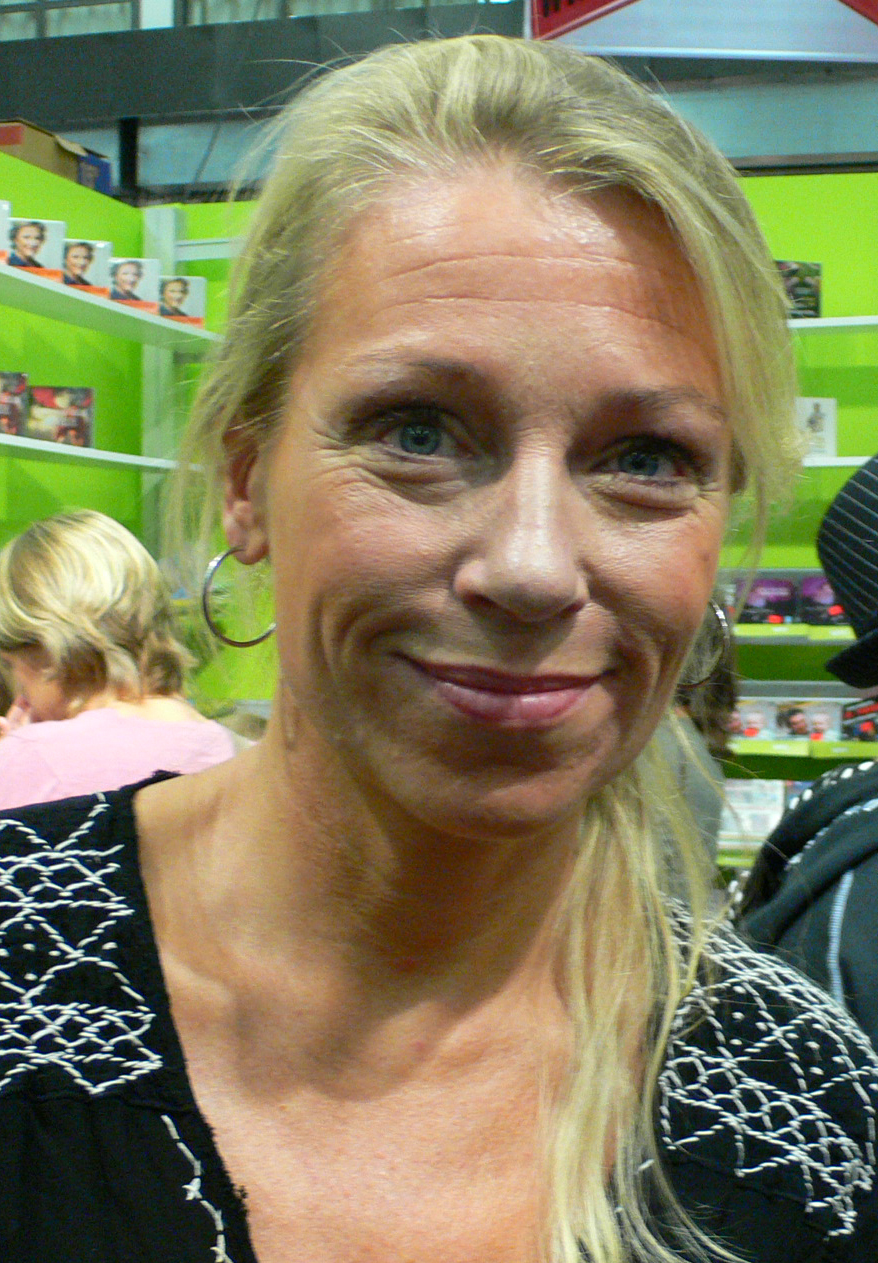
- Katarina Ewerlöf at Gothenburg Book Fair 2007.
- Born: Annette Elsa Katarina Ewerlöf; 28 December 1959 (age 66); Karlskrona, Sweden
- Occupation: Actress
- Years active: 1979–present
- Partner: Nils af Uhr

Annette Elsa Katarina Ewerlöf (born 28 December 1959) is a Swedish actress. She began acting in theater when she was 13 years old at Vår teater, a children's theater in Stockholm. Ewerlöf was educated at the theater university at the Stockholm Scene School (Scenskolan i Stockholm), and worked at the Royal Dramatic Theatre. Ewerlöf worked for many years in the 1970s and 1980s away from public attention in theaters, and had her first big hit as a major part in the TV series Pappas flicka in 1997. She is one of Sweden's most prolific audiobook narrators.

== Filmography ==
- 2003 - Paradiset (Paradise), Anne Snapphane
- 2000 - Livet är en schlager (Once in a Lifetime), Studio hostess
- 1999 - Tomten är far till alla barnen (In Bed With Santa), Sara
- 1998 - Beck – Vita nätter (Beck – White Nights), Jeanette Bolin
- 1979 - Kristoffers hus (Kristoffer's house), Party guest

== Television ==
- 2016–2017 - Black Widows
- 2013 - Fjällbackamorden – Havet ger, havet tar, Anette
- 2008 - Irene Huss – Glasdjävulen, Eva Möller
- 2005 - Kommissionen (The Commission), Lena Lagerfelt
- 2002 - Talismanen (The Talisman), Ann-Britt Höglund
- 2001 - Återkomsten (The Return), Pathologist
- 1997 - Pelle Svanslös, Mirjam
- 1997 - Pappas flicka (Daddy's Girl), Mona Kollberg
- 1997 - Skärgårdsdoktorn, Maria Lindelius
- 1996 - Zonen (The Zone), Cecilia Lagerlöf
- 1996 - Nudlar & 08:or (Noodles and Stockholmers), Laila
- 1989 - Husbonden (The Master), Karolin
