= Lamine Dieng =

Senegalese football manager (1951–2021)

Personal information
- Date of birth: 3 February 1951
- Place of birth: Saint-Louis, French Senegal, French West Africa, France
- Date of death: 7 December 2021 (aged 70)
- Place of death: Dakar, Senegal

Managerial career
- Years: Team
- 1988–1991: AS Douanes
- 1992–1993: Senegal
- US Gorée
- US Ouakam
- 2008–2009: Maghreb de Fès
- 2010–2011: ASC Jaraaf
- 2012–2013: AS Douanes
- 2014–2021: ASC Niarry Tally

Lamine Dieng (3 February 1951 – 7 December 2021) was a Senegalese football manager.

== Biography ==
Dieng was born in 1951 in Saint-Louis. During his childhood, he was impassioned with sport, particularly football, which led him to briefly play professionally for ASC Linguère. He became a physical education teacher at the Institut national supérieur de l'Éducation populaire et du Sport in Dakar. He then earned a scholarship to the Université des Sports in Reims and subsequently in Hamburg, where he earned a coaching diploma from the Bundesliga.

Dieng became coach of AS Douanes in 1988. He was then hired to coach the Senegal national team in 1992, although his contract was terminated the following year due to disagreements. He subsequently coached US Gorée, US Ouakam, Maghreb de Fès, and ASC Jaraaf. However, he was left without a coaching job from 2013 to 2014 before being hired by ASC Niarry Tally. The team earned second place in the 2015 Senegalese Ligue 1 championship behind AS Douanes.

Dieng died in Dakar on 7 December 2021, at the age of 70.
