= Jonas Gardell =

Swedish writer and comedian (born 1963)

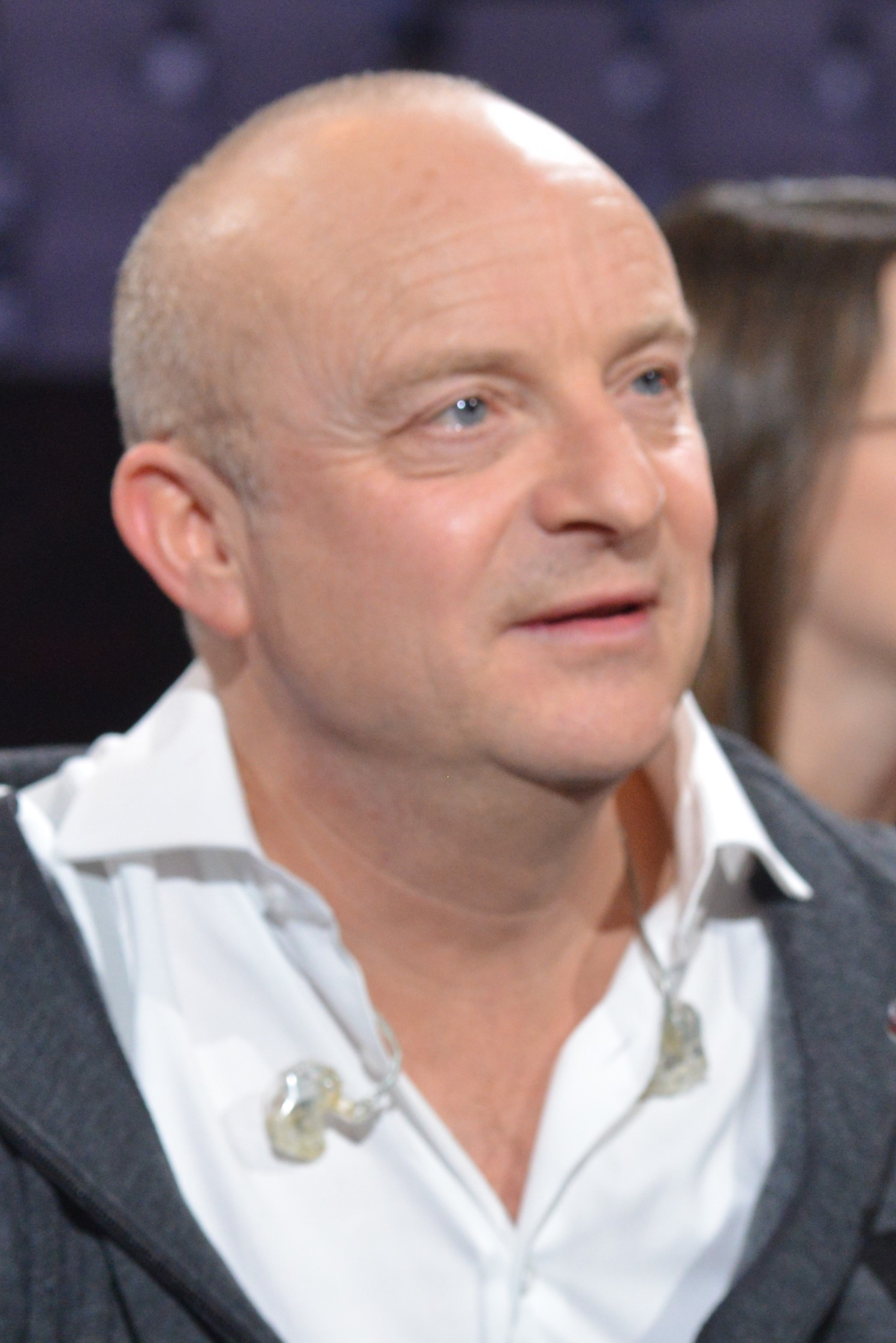
- Gardell in 2018
- Born: Lars Jonas Holger Gardell; 2 November 1963 (age 62); Täby, Sweden
- Occupations: Author, playwright, comedian, artist
- Years active: 1979–present
- Spouse: Mark Levengood (m. 2011; div. 2023)
- Children: 2
- Relatives: Mattias Gardell (brother); Stina Gardell (sister)

Lars Jonas Holger Gardell (born 2 November 1963 in Täby) is a Swedish novelist, playwright, screenwriter and comedian.

Since his debut as an author in 1979, Gardell has written numerous novels, television and film scripts, shows, and song lyrics. He is well known for his books and plays in all of the Nordic countries. His books have been translated into some twenty-five languages. Among his most notable novels are En komikers uppväxt (A Comedian's Upbringing, 1992) and the trilogy Don't Ever Wipe Tears Without Gloves (Torka aldrig tårar utan handskar), published between 2012 and 2013. Both novels have been adapted into television series broadcast on SVT, and En komikers uppväxt has also been made into a feature film.

Gardell has won several awards, including a Guldbagge Award for Best Screenplay for Pensionat Oskar, the Swedish TV award Kristallen for the series De halvt dolda, the Prix Futura for the novel En komikers uppväxt, the Fröding Scholarship, the Stora Svenska Talarpriset, and the Tage Danielsson Award in 1996. In 2007, he was awarded an honorary doctorate in theology from Lund University, in 2013 an honorary doctorate in medicine from Linköping University, and in 2018 an honorary doctorate in philosophy from the Faculty of Humanities, Psychology, and Theology at Åbo Akademi University.

== Early life ==
Jonas Gardell is the son of Bertil Gardell, professor of social psychology, and Ingegärd Gardell, psychologist, née Rasmussen. He is the brother of Mattias Gardell, a historian and scholar of comparative religion and Stina Gardell, a documentary filmmaker. Gardell grew up in Enebyberg, north of Stockholm, with his parents and three siblings; he was the second youngest. Both parents were psychologists and encouraged their children to let their imaginations run wild. The family was Christian and active in the Baptist Church.

Gardell's parents separated when he was young (they divorced in 1983) and his father left the family for his career and a new woman. Gardell has said on several occasions that his father was the kind of person who was only ever loved but never showed love in return. The divorce hit Gardell hard, and he has said in retrospect that "no safety net could have withstood the crash my family went through then. He turned his grief outward and, at the age of 14, began spending time at Klara Norra Kyrkogata in Stockholm, a well-known hangout for young male prostitutes. What he experienced there made him promise himself that he would never become a victim, someone who could be pitied.

After completing his upper secondary education in social sciences, Jonas Gardell applied to drama school at the age of 18, but when he found out that he was the 500th person to audition for Hamlet, he decided it was impossible. He then decided to become an artist and opened an art gallery with some friends. Gardell lived on welfare and worked as a life model. At the same time, Gardell wrote short stories and poems, and he made his debut as an author in 1981 at the age of 18 with the poetry collection Den tigande talar (The Silent One Speaks).

== Career ==
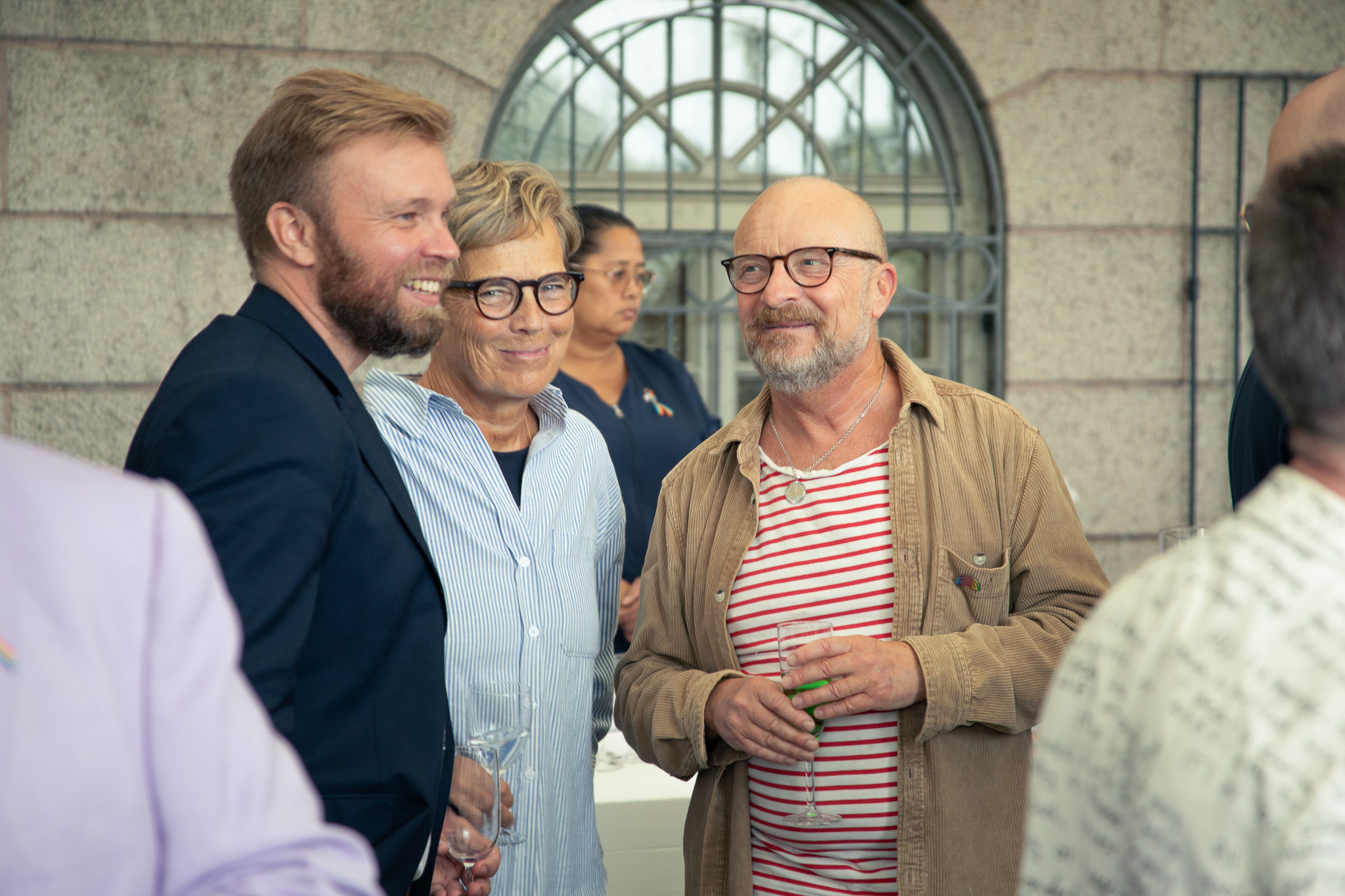
2024 Pride Reception at U.S. Embassy Sweden

=== Writing ===
In 1985, Gardell published his first novel, Passionsspelet (The Passion Play). The novel deals with his homosexuality, about being able to be who you are and being accepted by others and yourself.

Gardell himself has described how, during the early part of his writing career, he mainly wrote relatively thin books that revolved around his upbringing in the 1970s, one example being the trilogy En komikers uppväxt (A Comedian's Upbringing, 1992), which has become both a TV series and a movie. After the novel Jenny (2006), he felt he was done with autobiographical writing, and his writing took on a more documentary focus, with several novels depicting LGBTQ history in Sweden.

The novel trilogy Don't Ever Wipe Tears Without Gloves was published between 2012 and 2013 and received favorable reviews. The trilogy depicts the HIV epidemic in the 1980s and how it spread among young gay men. The books were adapted for television by Simon Kaijser, with Gardell writing the screenplay. Don't Ever Wipe Tears Without Gloves won several awards and had a very broad impact.

Faith and theology are recurring themes in his work. Gardell himself believes that his theological non-fiction books, Om Gud (About God, 2003) and Om Jesus (About Jesus, 2009), are among his best works in terms of style.

The novel Till minne av en villkorslös kärlek (In Memory of Unconditional Love) became one of the best-selling fiction books in Sweden in 2018. In 2021, he published the novel Ett lyckligare år (A Happier Year), which depicts, among other things, the philosopher Pontus Wikner's youth in Uppsala in the 1850s.

In 2022, he made his debut as author of Children's literature with Sagan om den lilla gråsparven (The Tale of the Little House sparrow), illustrated by Martin Jacobson.

=== Screenplay ===
The first feature film based on a screenplay by Jonas Gardell, Like It Never Was Before (Pensionat Oskar), premiered in 1995. In the fall of 1995, the film won the Grand Prix at the Festival des Films du Monde in Montréal, and Gardell received a Guldbagge Award for Best Screenplay. Gardell also wrote the screenplay for the film Livet är en schlager (Life is a pop song), from which the theme song Aldrig ska jag sluta älska dig (I Will Never Stop Loving You), with lyrics by Gardell, became a big hit. The song was later recorded by Gardell and reached number two on the Swedish record chart Svensktoppen.

=== Stage Shows ===
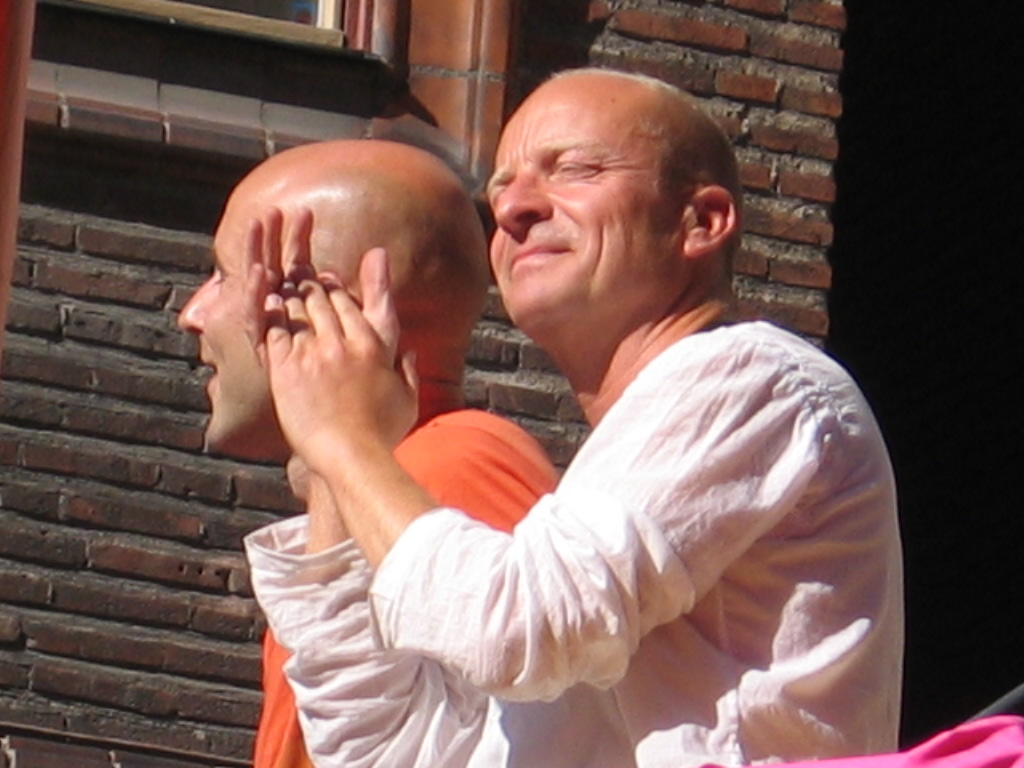
Jonas Gardell (right) with husband Mark Levengood at Stockholm Pride parade 2006

He began his stage career in 1986 with Good Night Mr Moon and has since had several acclaimed performances. In 1989, the stage show Kim and Jonas premiered. The show was produced in collaboration with composer and musician Kim Hedås and broadcast on SVT. Kim and Jonas helped establish Gardell as one of the most acclaimed stand-up comedians and artists of his generation.

In 2013, he began touring with Mitt enda liv (My One Life), which became a hit with audiences. In 2016, he premiered the stage show 30 år tillsammans (30 Years Together), in which he took stock of his 30 years as a stage artist.

Gardell performed his own play Tillfällig gäst i ditt liv (Temporary guest in your life) (2007) at the Scala Theater in Stockholm.

=== Television and radio ===
Gardell has appeared on several Swedish television programs, such as Stjärnorna på slottet, Så ska det låta, Doobidoo, and Sommarkrysset.

He competed in the song contest Melodifestivalen 2018 in the second semifinal with the song Det finns en väg and came in seventh place.

Gardell has hosted the Swedish radio show Sommar i P1 in 1990, 1991, 1992, 2013, and 2019, and its winter edition, Vinter, in 1991 and 2008.

In 2013, Gardell was elected "Homo Bi Trans Person of the Year" at the Swedish Gaygalan Awards, for the book Torka aldrig tårar utan handskar (Don't Ever Wipe Tears Without Gloves). His prize was presented to him by the Swedish Crown Princess Victoria.

== Honorary Doctorates ==
Gardell's faith is a recurring theme in his work, and he cites the Bible as his greatest source of inspiration. In December 2007, Gardell was awarded an honorary doctorate in theology from Lund University with the following justification:

Throughout his writing career, he has focused on marginalized people who are excluded from society, with a strong emphasis on defending human dignity and human rights. Few people can bring people together across generations and combine humor and seriousness with such accuracy as he can, making him an important social commentator and critic.

On May 17, 2013, Gardell was awarded an honorary doctorate in medicine at Linköping University. This time, part of the motivation, "for his multifaceted description of a dark chapter in Swedish medical history," met with some criticism.

On May 25, 2018, Gardell was awarded an honorary doctorate in philosophy by the Faculty of Humanities, Theology, and Psychology at Åbo Akademi University.

== Personal life ==
Gardell began living with Mark Levengood in 1986 and entered into a registered partnership with him in 1995. In 2011, Gardell and Levengood married. They remained married until 2023. The couple has two children, a son that Gardell has with his friend Ingeborg Svensson and a daughter that Levengood has with Fanny Ambjörnsson.

== Bibliography ==
- 1979 – Den tigande talar
- 1985 – Passionsspelet
- 1986 – Odjurets tid
- 1987 – Präriehundarna
- 1988 – Vill gå hem
- 1990 – Fru Björks öden och äventyr
- 1992 – En komikers uppväxt
- 1993 – Mormor gråter och andra texter
- 1995 – Frestelsernas berg
- 1997 – Isbjörnarna. Cheek to cheek. Människor i solen (tre pjäser)
- 1998 – Så går en dag ifrån vårt liv och kommer aldrig åter
- 1998 – Oskuld och andra texter
- 2001 – Ett ufo gör entré
- 2003 – Om Gud
- 2006 – Jenny
- 2009 – Om Jesus
- 2011 – Har man inget liv får man köpa ett som alla andra: Samlade visdomsord 2010–2011
- 2012 – Torka aldrig tårar utan handskar: 1, Kärleken
- 2013 – Torka aldrig tårar utan handskar: 2, Sjukdomen
- 2013 – Torka aldrig tårar utan handskar: 3, Döden
- 2014 – Livet suger och sen dansar man disco!
- 2016 – Bara på besök
- 2018 – Till minne av en villkorslös kärlek
- 2021 – Ett lyckligare år
- 2022 – Sagan om den lilla gråsparven (with Martin Jacobson)
- 2023 – Fjollornas fest

== Singles ==
Title	Year	Peak chart positions	Album
Title	Year	SWE	Album
"Aldrig ska jag sluta älska dig"	2000	—	Non-album singles
"Det finns en väg"	2018	—	Non-album singles
