= Sommaren 85 =

2020 Swedish television series

Sommaren 85 is a 2020 Swedish dramedy-series broadcast on SVT.

The series plot is about the summer of 1985 in the fictitious Swedish village of Braxinge where a "sausage party" sets several things in motion that will change the lives of Åsa and her daughter Lena forever.

== Cast ==
- Elina Sätterman – Lena
- Emma Broomé – Åsa Westerlund
- Lotta Tejle – Barbro Westerlund
- Mats Blomgren – Stickan Westerlund
- Kajsa Ernst – Ju-Anita
- Klara Kry – Sussi
- Morgan Alling – Janne
- Gustav Berghe – Finn-Magnus
- Kim Halén – Max
- Anton Lundqvist – Örjan
- Mattias Nordkvist – Grizzly
- Staffan Ling – Allan Klevenbrandt
- Eric Ericson – Frank
