= Pontus Gårdinger =

Swedish television host (born 1964)

- Born: Pontus Joakim Gårdinger; 20 July 1964 (age 61); Stockholm, Sweden
- Occupation: Television host
- Children: Malte Gårdinger

Pontus Joakim Gårdinger (born 20 July 1964) is a Swedish television presenter, producer and actor who has, among other things, hosted Melodifestivalen 1996. He also hosted the short lived reality show Miljonärerna on Kanal 5. He has also produced the Swedish TV show Grattis världen.

Gårdinger won the Poker Million competition 2007, where the first prize was SEK 1 million.

2014–2015 he was the host of the Swedish version of Jeopardy!

At the 2023 Ria Awards, Gårdinger was named Producer of the Year for his work as the producer of the reality show The Journey.

His son is actor Malte Gårdinger.

== Selected filmography ==
- 2002 – The Dog Trick
- 2001 – Pusselbitar (TV-series)
- 2000 – Naken
- 1995 – NileCity 105,6 (TV-series)
