= Malte Gårdinger =

Swedish actor (born 2000)

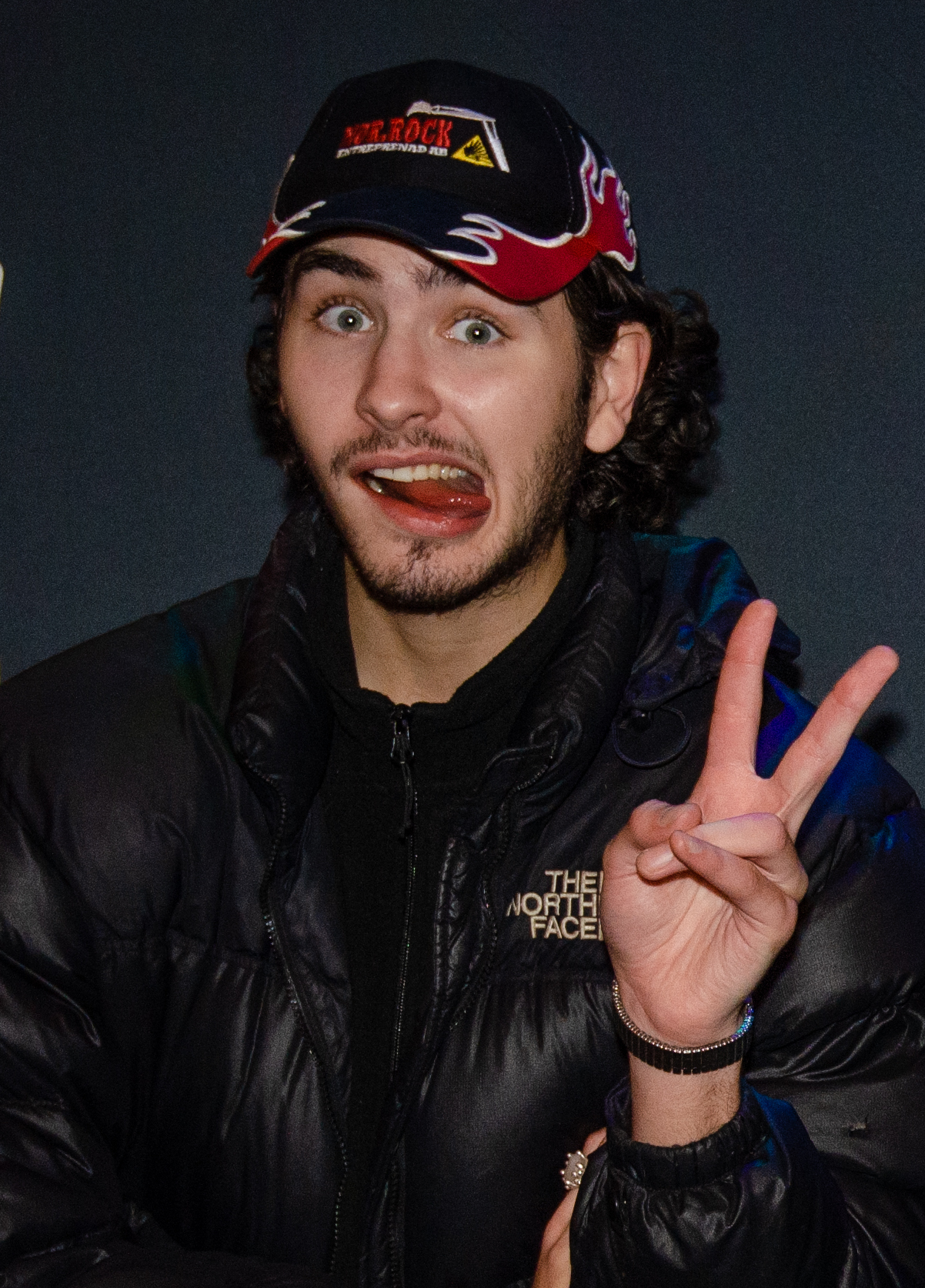
- Gårdinger at the Stockholm International Film Festival 2023
- Born: Lars Malte Isidor Myrenberg Gårdinger; 23 July 2000 (age 26); Sankt Matteus, Stockholm, Sweden
- Occupation: Actor
- Years active: 2014–present
- Father: Pontus Gårdinger

Lars Malte Isidor Myrenberg Gårdinger (born 23 July 2000) is a Swedish actor, chiefly known for starring as August in the Netflix series Young Royals from 2021 to 2024. Since 2021, he has released music under the name Gibbon (stylised in all caps).

== Early life ==
Gårdinger is the son of Swedish television personality Pontus Gårdinger.

== Filmography ==
=== Film ===
Key
†	Denotes films that have not yet been released

Year	Title	Role	Notes
2014	The Anderssons Rock the Mountains	Santos	
2016	#Will	William	
2017	Fate	Johannes	
2023	Ett sista race	Charlie	
2025	The Ugly Stepsister	Isak	

=== Television ===
Year	Title	Role	Notes
2017	Jordskott	Tonåsrskille	
2020	Sjukt oklar	Yosef	
2020	Morden i Sandhamn	Vincent Marklund	
2021–2024	Young Royals	August	Main role
2021	Skitsamma	Ola	
2021	Gåsmamman	Kei	

== Discography ==
List of singles as lead artist, showing year released
Title	Year
"Nära vän" (with Nonni)	2021
