= Young Royals =

Swedish teen drama series

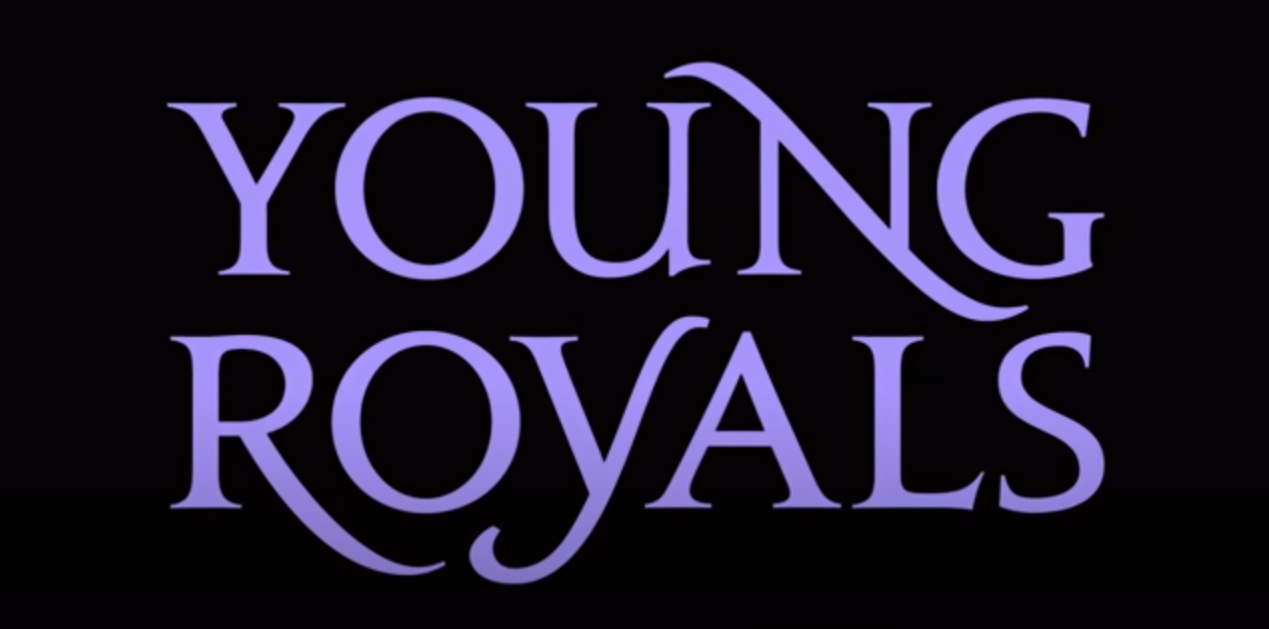
- Genre: Teen drama; Romance; Coming-of-age
- Created by: Lisa Ambjörn; Lars Beckung; Camilla Holter
- Starring: Edvin Ryding; Omar Rudberg; Malte Gårdinger; Frida Argento; Nikita Uggla
- Composer: Matti Bye
- Country of origin: Sweden
- Original language: Swedish
- No. of seasons: 3
- No. of episodes: 18

Production
- Executive producer: Lars Beckung
- Producers: Lisa Berggren Eyre; Martin Söder
- Editors: Andreas Brixter; Gregers Dohn; Sofia Lindgren
- Running time: 40–56 minutes
- Production company: Nexiko AB

Original release
- Network: Netflix
- Release: 1 July 2021 – 18 March 2024

Young Royals is a Swedish teen drama romance television series created by Lisa Ambjörn, Lars Beckung, and Camilla Holter for the streaming service Netflix which stars Edvin Ryding and Omar Rudberg. The series premiered with its first season on 1 July 2021 and concluded on March 18, 2024, after 18 episodes spanning three seasons.

Set at the fictional elite boarding school Hillerska, the plot primarily follows the fictional Prince Wilhelm of Sweden (Ryding), his romance with fellow student Simon Eriksson (Rudberg), and the resulting drama.

== Premise ==
Young Royals follows Prince Wilhelm of Sweden in the prestigious boarding school Hillerska as he develops a relationship with his classmate Simon. Under the constant view of the public eye, the series depicts how their relationship affects everyone around them. The series addresses homophobia, mental illness, eating disorders, infidelity, drug addiction, stalking, abuse, internalized racism, autism, the relationship between social classes, and constitutional monarchy.

== Cast and characters ==
=== Main ===
- Edvin Ryding as Prince Wilhelm "Wille" of Sweden (later Crown Prince Wilhelm of Sweden), (Note: Crown Prince Wilhelm of Sweden from Season 1, Episode 4 onwards) next in line to Sweden's throne after his elder brother, Erik
- Omar Rudberg as Simon Eriksson, a rising star in Hillerska's choir, a scholarship and non-boarding student; Sara's brother and Wilhelm's love interest
- Malte Gårdinger as August Horn of Årnäs, a member of a noble family and second cousin of Wilhelm and Erik, third-year student, prefect and captain of the rowing team
- Frida Argento as Sara Eriksson, a scholarship non-boarding student and Simon's elder sister, who has social difficulty as a result of her Asperger's and ADHD
- Nikita Uggla as Felice Ehrencrona, a boarding student and member of the "modern nobility"

=== Recurring ===
- Pernilla August as Queen Kristina of Sweden, the Queen regnant of Sweden and Wilhelm and Erik's mother
- Magnus Roosmann as Duke Ludvig, Queen Kristina's husband and consort, Wilhelm and Erik's father
- Carmen Gloria Pérez as Linda, Simon and Sara's mother
- Inti Zamora Sobrado as Ayub, Simon's friend from Bjärstad
- Beri Gerwise as Rosh, Simon's friend from Bjärstad
- Ivar Forsling as Prince Erik (season 1), the crown prince of Sweden and Wilhelm's elder brother
- Anna Valkyria Petersson as Malin, Wilhelm's bodyguard
- Leonard Terfelt as Micke (season 1 and season 3), Simon and Sara's father
- Ingela Olsson as Miss Anette Lilja, Hillerska's headmistress
- Felicia Truedsson as Stella, Felice's friend and a student at Hillerska
- Mimmi Cyon as Fredrika, Felice's friend and a student at Hillerska
- Nathalie Varli as Madison McCoy, Felice's friend and an international student at Hillerska
- Samuel Astor as Nils Polstjerna, August's friend and a student at Hillerska.
- Xiao-Long Rathje Zhao as Alexander, August's friend and a student at Hillerska
- Fabian Penje as Henry, Wilhelm's friend and a student at Hillerska
- Uno Elger as Walter, Henry's friend and a student at Hillerska
- Nils Wetterholm as Vincent af Klintskog, August's friend and a student at Hillerska
- Tommy Wättring as Marcus Sköld (season 2), Simon's love interest
- Magnus Ehrner as Jan-Olof Munck (season 2), a royal adviser
- Marall Nasiri as Farima (season 3), a royal adviser

== Episodes ==
Series	Episodes		Originally released
1	6		1 July 2021
2	6		1 November 2022
3	6	5	11 March 2024
3	6	1	18 March 2024

=== Season 1 (2021) ===
No. overall	No. in season	Title	Directed by	Written by	Original release date
1	1	"Episode 1"	Rojda Sekersöz	Lisa Ambjörn, Lars Beckung, Sofie Forsman	1 July 2021
After a video of Prince Wilhelm of Sweden fighting at a party is posted online, he is given a script for an apology speech and learns that his parents have enrolled him at Hillerska Boarding School, a prestigious boarding school in the country. He is lectured about attending Hillerska and despite his brother Erik being crown prince, Wilhelm still has to uphold his responsibilities as a prince. Wilhelm arrives at the boarding school and is greeted by his second cousin, August. They head to the school church, where Wilhelm sees his childhood friend, Felice, in the choir. Wilhelm keeps his eyes on the soloist, Simon, as he sings. Afterward, while August talks with his friends, they laugh at Simon for being a new non-boarder at the school. A day later, August approaches Simon about obtaining liquor for Wilhelm's initiation party and he agrees on the condition that he and his sister, Sara, are invited to the party. At the party, Wilhelm and Simon get to know each other better. The episode ends with the two boys nearly on top of each other.
2	2	"Episode 2"	Rojda Sekersöz	Lisa Ambjörn, Lars Beckung, Sofie Forsman	1 July 2021
August struggles with his addiction to ADHD medication, and is advised by Vincent to start taking an assessment with the school counselor. Instead of waiting two weeks for the counseling process to diagnose him, August attempts to obtain more medication while also being in debt to Simon for the liquor. He asks Sara for her meds but is held back by Simon before they agree that he will repay him double the original amount. Simon starts private tutoring after getting bad results on a math test. Wilhelm joins Simon at night to watch his friend Rosh play football, moments which Simon shares on social media. Upon returning to Hillerska, August warns him not to hang with the wrong people and has Wilhelm ask Simon to delete the video. During a film night at school, Wilhelm and Simon share a kiss.
3	3	"Episode 3"	Erika Calmeyer	Lisa Ambjörn, Lars Beckung, Sofie Forsman	1 July 2021
Hillerska hosts a spirited Parents' Weekend, but a bevy of surprises, disappointments, and more occur for Wilhelm, August, and Simon. August learns from his mother that they cannot afford his tuition, suggesting he could sell his art to raise money, but August dismisses the idea. Furthermore, Simon pressures August about the repayment, but August dismisses his pleas. Simon resorts to asking for help from his friends and together they confront August. Simon attacks him, and August confesses that his family is broke, which is why he cannot repay Simon. As a consequence, Simon's friends distance themselves from him. Wilhelm dismisses the kiss they shared the previous night and wants to remain friends with Simon. However, sometime later he changes his mind. He also proposes they spend time together at school during the weekend, but he is forced to rearrange their meeting location due to August also deciding to stay at school. Wilhelm is later called in by the head mistress and is phoned by the Queen, who informs him that his brother, Crown Prince Erik, has died in a car accident.
4	4	"Episode 4"	Rojda Sekersöz	Lisa Ambjörn, Lars Beckung, Sofie Forsman	1 July 2021
As Erik's funeral is held, Wilhelm is declared Crown Prince and spends time with his family before returning to Hillerska, where he makes a speech to the students in memory of his brother. Simon checks on him afterward, and Wilhelm asks him to delete their texts. Simon also pressures August to repay him, forcing him to sell his father's medication, which also lands him in trouble with his father. August slowly starts repaying Simon. August and Felice become a couple, and the relationship strains from August's jealousy. Wilhelm joins the Society and, at a party, drinks alcohol heavily and consumes other drugs. Simon rescues a drunken Wilhelm. They return to Wilhelm's dorm room, where they spend the night. In the morning, the two have sex, but unbeknownst to them are filmed through the window by August.
5	5	"Episode 5"	Erika Calmeyer	Lisa Ambjörn, Lars Beckung, Sofie Forsman	1 July 2021
August and Wilhelm face off over how to resolve a disciplinary problem at school when Alexander is expelled after being found in possession of drugs from the party. August suggests that they should put the blame on Simon, which troubles Wilhelm. He tells Simon about the situation, but Simon scoffs at his concerns about how the scandal would affect the royal family. Wilhelm decides to instead put the blame on Alexander, much to August's protest, but he uses his financial situation against him, and is unanimously backed by the other boys. Wilhelm and Simon grow closer together, spending time at Simon's home one night. Wilhelm informs Simon about his resolution to Alexander's situation, and they reconcile. Sara spends the night with Felice and Madison and tells Felice of her intimate encounter with August, which leads to Felice publicly dumping August via social media. Sara revels in hanging out with Felice and her friends, joining them to prepare for the upcoming St. Lucy's Day celebrations. An angry August retaliates by uploading the video of Wilhelm and Simon, only to later learn that Wilhelm had actually helped him in resolving his financial situation by having the Royal Palace look into it.
6	6	"Episode 6"	Erika Calmeyer	Lisa Ambjörn, Lars Beckung, Sofie Forsman	1 July 2021
Wilhelm feels conflicted about how to handle the aftermath of the leaked video whilst Simon's life gets invaded by the press. The Queen visits Wilhelm and urges him to make a statement denying that he appeared in the video, something Wilhelm does not want to do. Simon's mother wants to pull him and Sara from Hillerska and send them back to Marieberg for the next school term, something to which Sara objects, wanting to become a resident at Hillerska. Wilhelm issues a statement denying that he is in the video. Finding missing pixels in the video and in August's Instagram photos, Felice figures out that August leaked the video and tells Wilhelm, who confronts August, feeling betrayed. Wilhelm also tells the Queen, but she reveals that she already knew. Following the Christmas ceremony, Wilhelm hugs Simon and confesses his love, with no declaration of love in return from Simon. Many students see this and begin to whisper. Wilhelm leaves for the holiday break.

=== Season 2 (2022) ===
No. overall	No. in season	Title	Directed by	Written by	Original release date
7	1	"Episode 1"	Rojda Sekersöz	Lisa Ambjörn	1 November 2022
Simon meets Marcus, a colleague of Sara. Sara gains a scholarship to board at Hillerska. During her boarding house initiation, she drinks alcohol and starts a fire. Simon asks Marcus for a lift to rescue her. Simon encounters Wilhelm, who sees him drive off with Marcus. Wilhelm is blackmailing August for favours to embarrass him in front of his senior friends, in exchange for not revealing that it was August who leaked the video of Wilhelm and Simon. August believes it was Sara who revealed August's treachery to Wilhelm, when in fact Wilhelm found out from Felice. Wilhelm conceals from Alexander that he was involved in getting him suspended from school the previous term. Sara struggles with money at the expensive school canteen and hides this from her friends. Wilhelm sees a video of Simon and Marcus performing karaoke together. Wilhelm phones his mother, the Queen, angry that he was made to conceal his relationship with Simon and that decisions are being made behind his back, and announces he will no longer perform his royal duties.
8	2	"Episode 2"	Rojda Sekersöz	Lisa Ambjörn, Pia Gradvall	1 November 2022
Sara receives expensive gifts from her housemates for her birthday as it is tradition. Wilhelm suggests the other seniors remove August from his coveted position of prefect. The Queen orders that Wilhelm be taken out of Hillerska. Wilhelm resists, and a snow globe given to him by his deceased brother Erik is broken. The Queen says that royals must keep their relationships secret, but if Wilhelm insists on being the first openly gay member of the House of Bernadotte, they can discuss it after he turns 18. The Queen insists Wilhelm visit a therapist, while he in return demands his security detail be removed. Simon attempts to keep Wilhelm at Hillerska by speaking to the Headmistress but is unsuccessful. Simon again refuses to be Wilhelm's secret. Simon goes on another date with Marcus, and the two share a kiss. Sara discovers Wilhelm and Felice's messages about August leaking the video, and reveals this to August. Sara tells August that she wants to have sex with him, to his bemusement. Felice and Wilhelm go clay pigeon shooting, but Marcus is the thrower; all the while Wilhelm's jealousy of Marcus grows. Wilhelm helps Simon keep his scholarship at Hillerska by helping them both cheat on a qualifying run for the crew team. August receives an invitation to the Royal Palace via voicemail.
9	3	"Episode 3"	Kristina Humle	Lisa Ambjörn, Sofie Forsman, Tove Forsman	1 November 2022
August consults a lawyer (his stepfather). Wilhelm opens up to his therapist. Wilhelm and Simon work on a school project together. Simon tells Wilhelm he is not in a relationship with Marcus. Wilhelm and Simon compete in a rowing competition, but their team loses. Marcus comes to spectate and kisses Simon, observed by an upset Wilhelm. Vincent, August's replacement as prefect and crew team captain, becomes increasingly authoritarian. The Queen secretly makes August second in line to the throne, behind Wilhelm, and tells him to prepare to give a speech for Hillerska's anniversary in case Wilhelm will not give it. Wilhelm and Felice kiss, but are discovered by Henry, a fellow housemate.
10	4	"Episode 4"	Kristina Humle	Lisa Ambjörn	1 November 2022
News of Wilhelm and Felice's kiss spreads – the boys laugh it up while Felice faces accusations of being a gold digger. Simon and Wilhelm argue. Wilhelm and Felice reconcile. All students prepare for the St. Valentine's traditions, which see boys write poems for the girls they like, and culminate in a 1700s-themed ball. Simon asks Marcus to go with him, but he declines. The Royal Court telephones August about their intention to plan his next 10 years, starting with military service. August reveals his status as Wilhelm's backup to Sara. August asks Sara to the ball, but she declines due to being worried about Felice's reaction. Felice declines Wilhelm's offer to go as friends, so all the girls go together. August tells Alexander that Wilhelm was responsible for his suspension over drugs. Marcus takes Simon to the ball, but Simon is distracted by Wilhelm. Wilhelm makes peace with Marcus, but when Simon follows Wilhelm outside, the pair wind up in a passionate embrace. Inspired by the kiss, Simon debuts a transcendent performance of his new solo to the delighted students.
11	5	"Episode 5"	Lisa Farzaneh	Lisa Ambjörn, Sofie Forsman, Tove Forsman	1 November 2022
The Queen's adviser Jan-Olof insists the traditional version of the school song is sung, to avoid Simon's solo drawing attention to the relationship between Wilhelm and Simon. Wilhelm tells Simon that August leaked the video. The Queen tells Wilhelm that if he does not give the speech, August will. Felice's parents sell her horse, Rousseau, upsetting Sara. Wilhelm tells Simon that if he presses charges against August, Wilhelm will no longer have a backup. Nonetheless, Simon decides to report August to the police. Wilhelm and Simon reconcile.
12	6	"Episode 6"	Lisa Farzaneh	Lisa Ambjörn	1 November 2022
Simon breaks up with Marcus. August convinces Alexander to take the blame for the leaked video, and says that if Simon goes to the police, he will reveal Simon sold him drugs. Sara admits her relationship with August to Felice, who is furious with her. When Wilhelm threatens August with a shotgun, Sara reveals she told August that Simon was about to go to the police. Simon decides not to go to the police to spare his mother the embarrassment. August buys Felice's old horse, Rousseau, as a present for Sara, but Sara leaves him. Before the school's anniversary gala, Simon tells Wilhelm that he loves him. At the gala, Wilhelm delivers a heartfelt speech on being open and not keeping secrets, and publicly admits it was him in the video. Sara reports August to the police.

=== Season 3 (2024) ===
No. overall	No. in season	Title	Directed by	Written by	Original release date
13	1	"Episode 1"	Julia Lindström	Lisa Ambjörn	11 March 2024
August signs a financial settlement with Wilhelm and Simon. The Queen is ill. Wilhelm's aide Farima suggests using his relationship with Simon to modernise the image of the monarchy. The students prepare for a "50 Days" party. Simon responds to online speculation about his relationship. Sara and Felice are both upset about August. A newspaper article is published alleging historical bullying at Hillerska, and a new headteacher imposes a curfew in response.
14	2	"Episode 2"	Julia Lindström	Lisa Ambjörn, Pia Gradvall	11 March 2024
The students plan a camping trip. Sara stays away from school, and moves in with her father. Wilhelm joins Simon's choir. Wilhelm tries to discourage Simon from posting his songs on social media. Simon's friends attend the camping trip, but the school girls make insensitive comments. The Queen takes sick leave with depression.
15	3	"Episode 3"	Jerry Carlsson	Lisa Ambjörn, Tove Forsman, Sofie Forsman	11 March 2024
As his mother's health worsens, Wilhelm sees the throne looming. Wilhelm and August are forced to attend mediation together. Paparazzi harass Wilhelm and Simon. People threaten Simon on social media. Wilhelm refuses to sign August's petition. The School Inspectorate visits, and interviews Felice. August asks Sara to come back to school, and her father convinces her to. The school celebrates Walpurgis and the graduating students put on their student caps for the first time. Simon is photographed attending a left-wing demonstration, and his house is attacked.
16	4	"Episode 4"	Jerry Carlsson	Lisa Ambjörn, Ebba Stymne	11 March 2024
Wilhelm and Simon debate the monarchy and gay rights. Vincent organises a school strike to get their mobile phones back. After Sara returns to Hillerska, Sara and Felice cannot avoid each other. August tells Wilhelm that his brother Erik was responsible for the hazing incident.
17	5	"Episode 5"	Linnéa Roxeheim	Lisa Ambjörn, Theo Boguslaw	11 March 2024
Wilhelm wonders if his deceased brother Erik would have liked him. Sara's father is supposed to take her to her driving test, but he lets her down. Simon attends Wilhelm's 17th birthday celebration. The third years celebrate their graduation, waited on by the first years. August and Sara appear to reconcile. Simon makes a decision regarding his relationship with Wilhelm.
18	6	"Episode 6"	Linnéa Roxeheim	Lisa Ambjörn, Ebba Stymne	18 March 2024
Following their breakup, and Hillserka's fate hanging in the balance, Wilhelm and Simon weigh duty versus love as they learn what it takes to fully follow their hearts. Felice makes an unexpected choice about her summer plans. Sara gets a surprise. August receives news about his future.

== Production ==
=== Development and casting ===
In July 2020, an untitled coming-of-age series created by Lisa Ambjörn, Lars Beckung and Camilla Holter was announced, with Rojda Sekersöz set to direct. The series is inspired by the controversies surrounding the Swedish boarding school Lundsbergs.

In January 2021, long before the announcement of the series' release date, Edvin Ryding, Pernilla August, Malte Gårdinger, Frida Argento, Nikita Uggla and Omar Rudberg were announced to have been cast in the starring roles while Nathalie Varli, Felicia Truedsson, Mimmi Cyon, Ingela Olsson, Rennie Mirro, Livia Millhagen and David Lenneman were announced to have been cast in recurring roles. Ryding was cast as Prince Wilhelm and Pernilla August was cast to play his mother, Queen Kristina of Sweden. It was later announced that Rudberg would play Simon, Prince Wilhelm's love interest. Ryding and Rudberg also re-recorded their lines for the English dub version.

On 22 September 2021, the series was renewed for a second season.

In December 2022, the series was renewed for a third and final season.

=== Filming ===
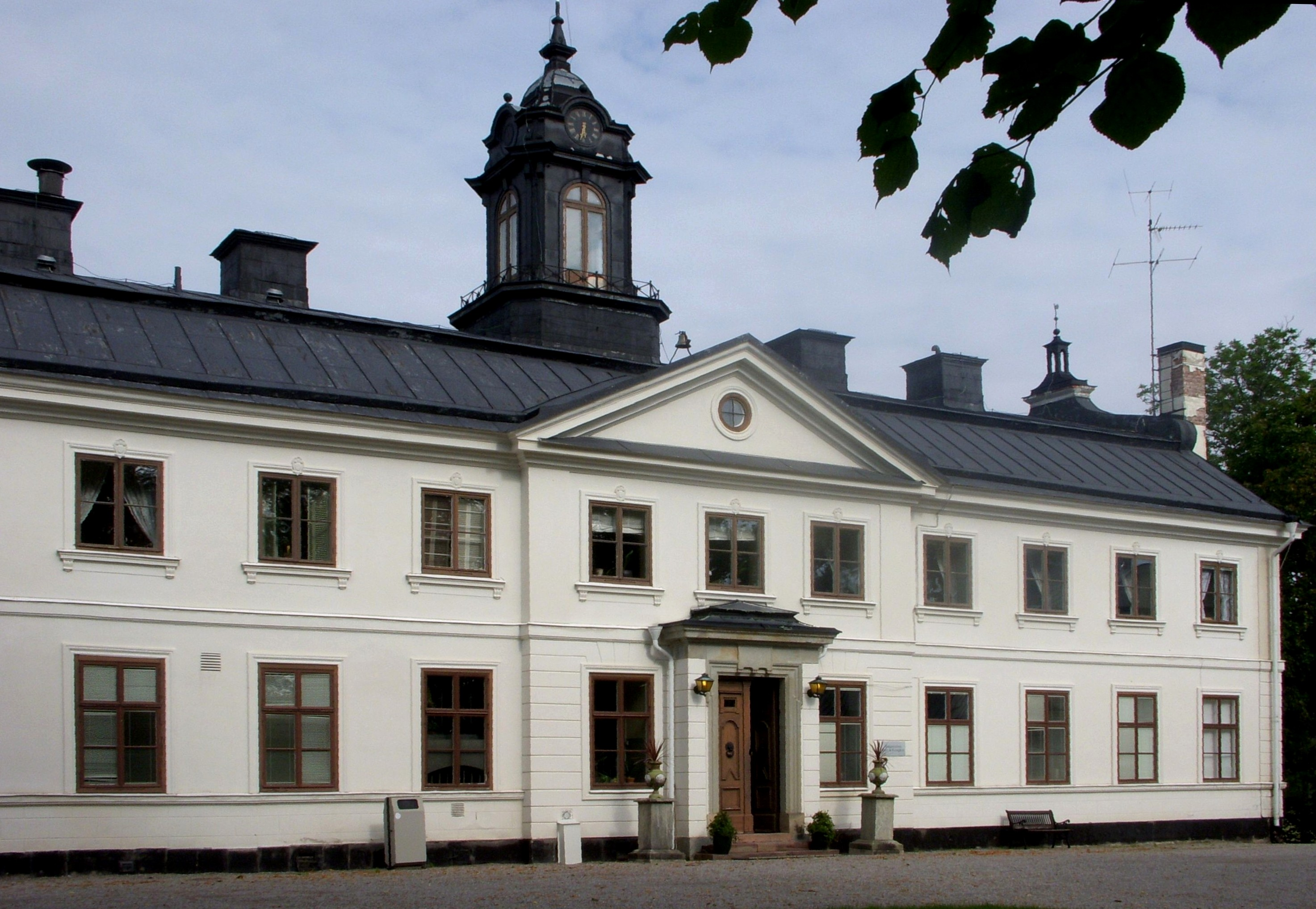
Kaggeholms gård

The series was mostly filmed at Kaggeholms gård, a manor-style building located in Stockholm County that is operated as a conference center. The scenes that took place at the royal palace were filmed at Stora Sundby Castle.

In February 2022, Netflix began filming a second season. A promotional video was released on Instagram. Filming for the second season concluded in May 2022.

Filming for the third and final season began in April 2023 and finished in June 2023.

=== Marketing ===
The series' official teaser was released on 19 May 2021 with the official trailer released on 17 June 2021. On 15 December 2022, Ryding and Rudberg made their US television debut as guests on The Tonight Show Starring Jimmy Fallon, where they promoted Young Royals and its third and final season.

== Release ==
All six episodes of the first season premiered on Netflix on July 1, 2021. The second season was released on November 1, 2022. The third and final season was released in two parts: the first five episodes premiered on March 11, 2024, while the series finale was released on March 18, 2024.

== Reception ==
=== Viewership ===
The first season made it to the top 10 in 12 countries and was streamed for more than 9.8 million hours worldwide. In the first week after its release, the first season was ranked the eighth most streamed non-English language series on Netflix worldwide.

The second season made it to the top 10 in 26 countries and was streamed more than 18 million hours in the first week. During this week, the second season was ranked the third most streamed non-English language series on Netflix worldwide.

The third season's first five episodes made it to the top 10 in 47 countries and was streamed more than 11.5 million hours by its first week. During this week, the third season was the fifth most streamed non-English language series on Netflix worldwide. The finale kept the show afloat in top 10 in ninth place, garnering 7.5 million hours watched by its second week.

=== Critical response ===
Young Royals received critical acclaim and positive responses from audiences. On the review aggregation website Rotten Tomatoes, the series holds an approval rating of 100%, based on five reviews, with an average rating of 8.3/10. It has been praised for its fidelity to real life in casting teenagers for teenage roles and showing skin textures with blemishes. Some critics and audiences compared the series favourably to similar shows such as Elite, Gossip Girl, The Crown and Skam.

David Opie of Digital Spy praised Young Royals for "cast[ing] actors who actually look the age they are supposed to be playing" and "portray[ing] teenage life with some much-needed authenticity". He described the series as "an updated version of the classic Cinderella story" and concluded that the series "excels most [...] when it comes to the central romance between Wilhelm and Simon". TV critic Flora Carr of Radio Times in a review of the first two episodes described the series as "predictable but heartfelt". She criticised the series' "checklist of teen-romance visuals" and "the plot's reliance on characters like August", but ultimately concluded that "the authentically teenage cast may also prove a breath of fresh air" for younger viewers.

For the second season, Dieter Osswald of Swiss lifestyle magazine Display wrote: "Like stand-up characters, the separated lovers defy their fate and fight for their love. The chemistry between Edvin Ryding as the insecure prince and Omar Rudberg as the sensitive singer works even better than in the first season. Fans of creep August aka Malte Gardinger can look forward to bigger appearances with a strongly expanded role - including a naked phone call with the royal family."

For the third season, Germany's popular site Queer.de wrote: "Convinces with plenty of emotional drama, surprising twists, and more political stance. Are you still watching? Or are you already crying?"

== See also ==
- Red, White & Royal Blue
- Heartstopper
