= Yrrol =

Yrrol: An Enormously Well Thought Out Movie
- Directed by: Peter Dalle
- Written by: Peter Dalle; Rolf Börjlind
- Produced by: Christer Abrahamsen
- Starring: Suzanne Reuter; Ulla Skoog; Peter Dalle; Claes Månsson; Johan Ulveson; Stefan Sauk; Lena Endre; Gunnel Fred; Gunilla Röör
- Cinematography: Olof Johnson
- Distributed by: SF
- Release date: 28 October 1994 (Sweden)
- Running time: 88 minutes
- Country: Sweden
- Language: Swedish
- Box office: SEK 28,803,941 (Sweden)

Yrrol: An Enormously Well Thought Out Movie (Swedish: Yrrol – En kolossalt genomtänkt film) is a Swedish comedy film which was released to cinemas in Sweden on 28 October 1994, directed by Peter Dalle. The roles are played by comedians from the TV series Lorry and some characters from the TV show are in the film.

== Synopsis ==
An ancient Greek philosopher's comical vision of how life would play out two thousand years into the future, in the Sweden of the 1990s.

== Reception ==
The film opened at the top of the Swedish box office with a gross of 5.3 million SEK from 50 screens.

== Awards ==
Peter Dalle and Rolf Börjlind won the Guldbagge Award for Best Screenplay and Suzanne Reuter for Best Actress in a Leading Role.
