= Guldbagge Award for Best Screenplay =

Swedish film award

- Country: Sweden
- Presented by: Swedish Film Institute
- First award: 1988 (for writing in films released during the 1988 film season)
- Final award: 2024
- Currently held by: Ernst De Geer and Mads Stegger, The Hypnosis (2024)
- Website: guldbaggen.se

The Guldbagge for Best Screenplay is a Swedish film award presented annually by the Swedish Film Institute (SFI) as part of the Guldbagge Awards (Swedish: "Guldbaggen") to screenwriters working in the Swedish motion picture industry.

== Winners and nominees ==
Each Guldbagge Awards ceremony is listed chronologically below along with the winner of the Guldbagge Award for Best Screenplay and the film associated with the award. Before 1991 the awards did not announce nominees, only winners. In the columns under the winner of each award are the other nominees for best screenplay, which are listed from 1991 and forward.

Winners before the nomination system (1964–1990)
Winners under the nomination system (1991–present)

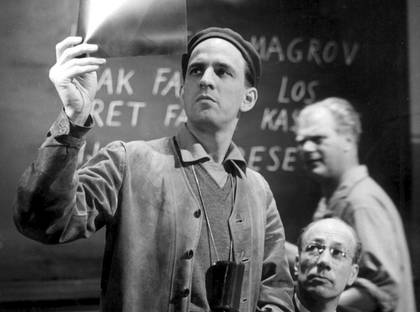
Ingmar Bergman won the award in 1992 for The Best Intentions.

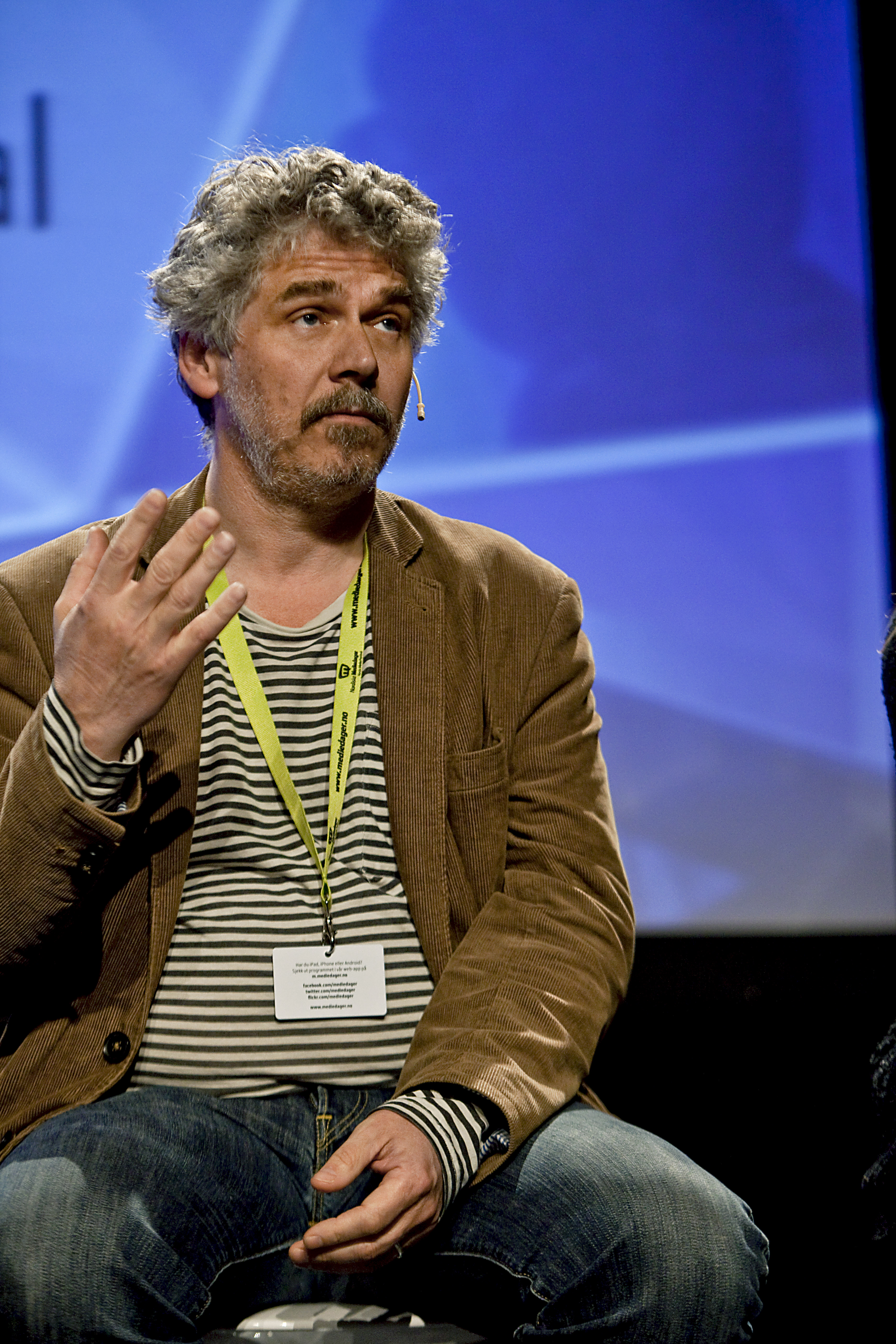
Daniel Alfredson co-won the award in 1993 for The Man on the Balcony.

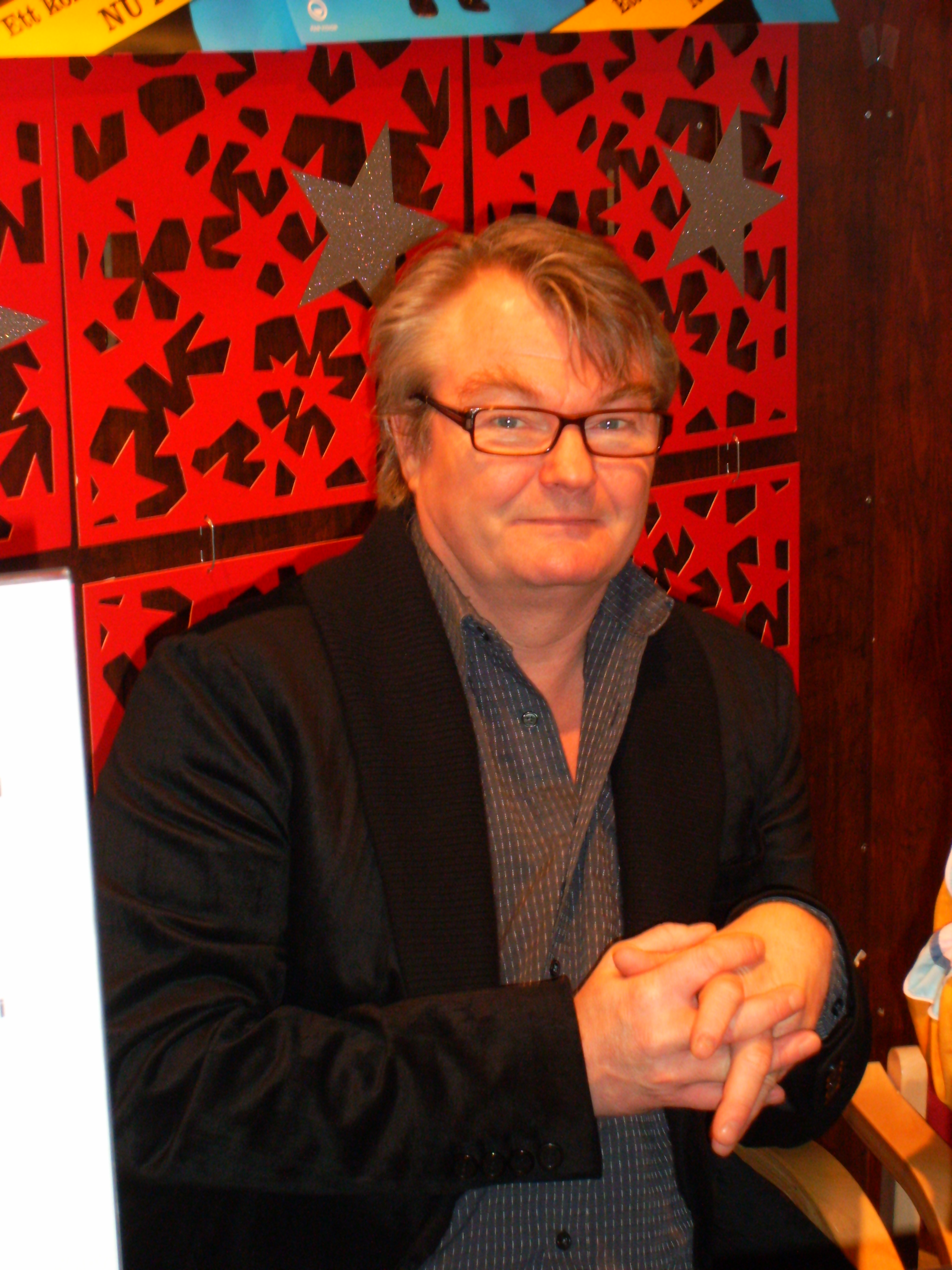
Peter Dalle co-won the award in 1994 for Yrrol.

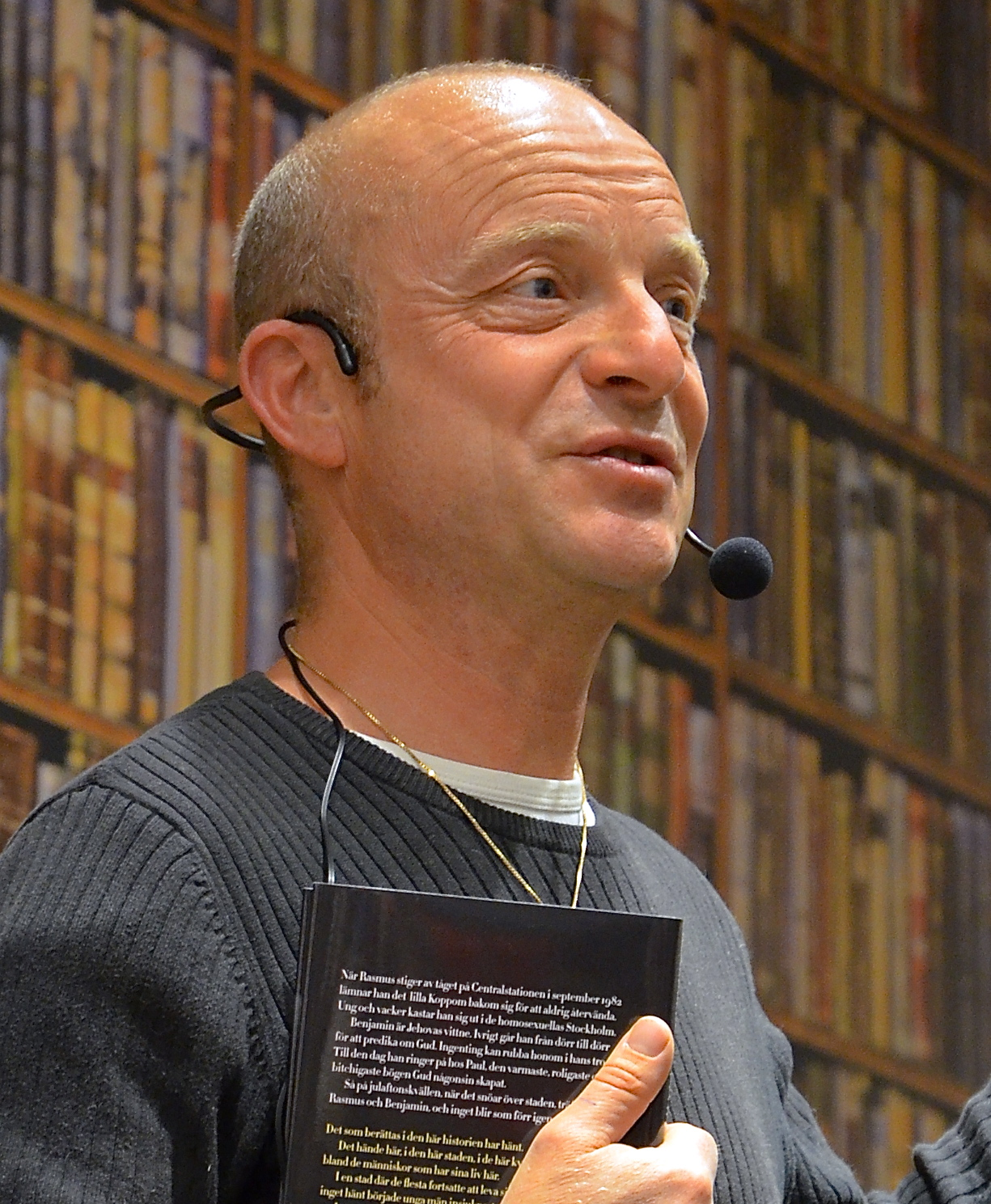
Jonas Gardell won the award in 1995 for Like It Never Was Before.

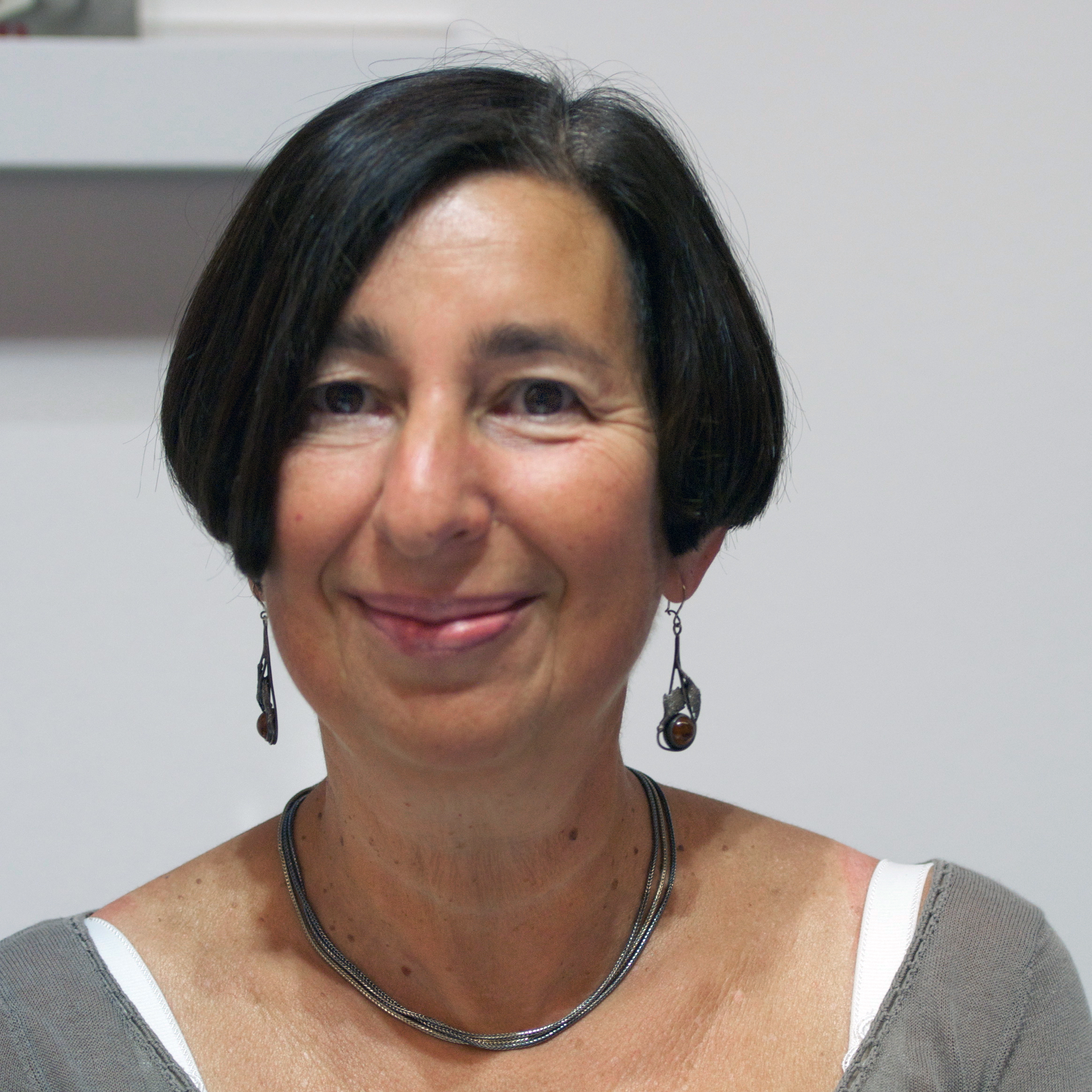
Annika Thor won the award in 1997 for Sanning eller konsekvens.

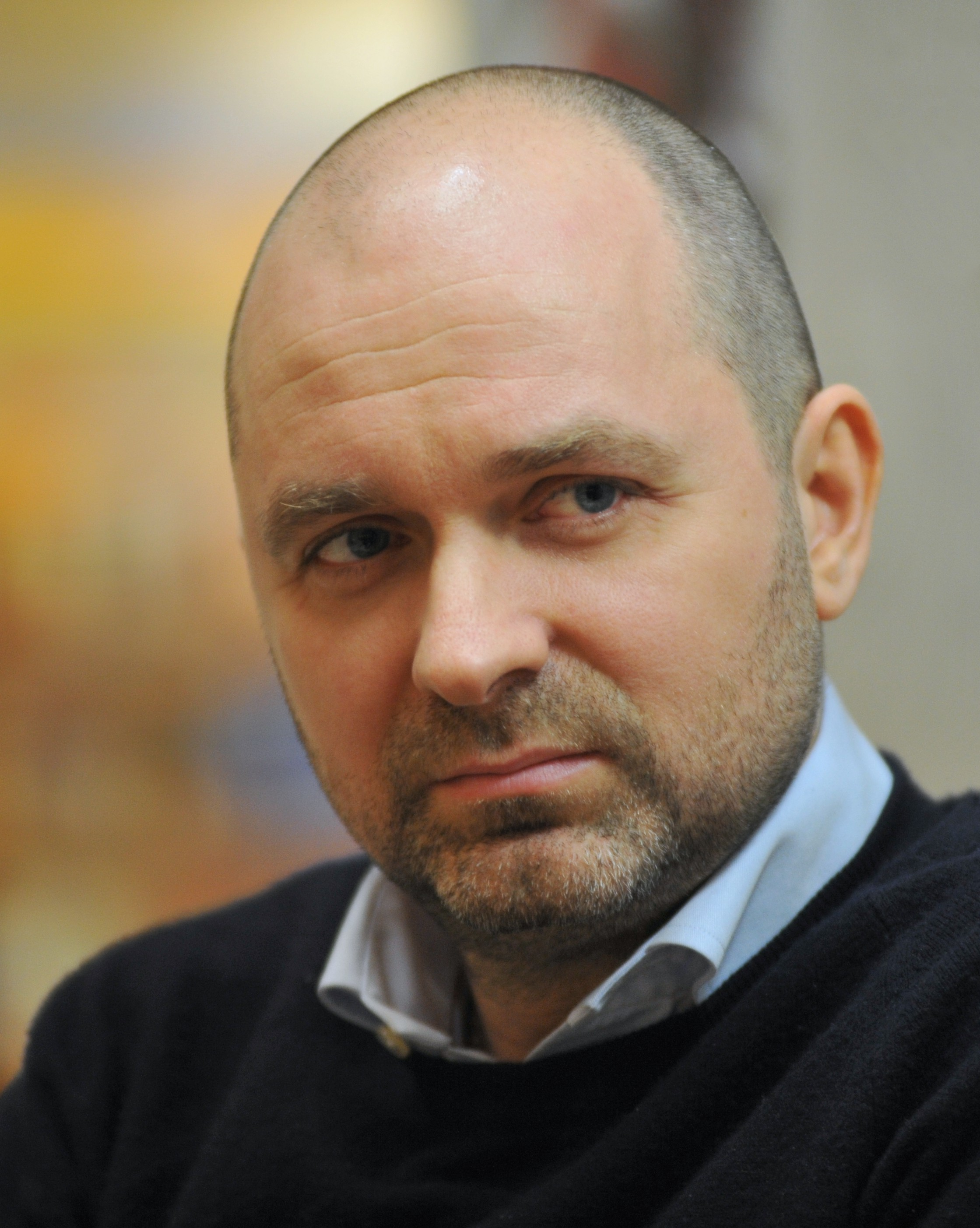
Lukas Moodysson won the award twice, the first for 1998's Show Me Love and 2002's Lilya 4-ever.

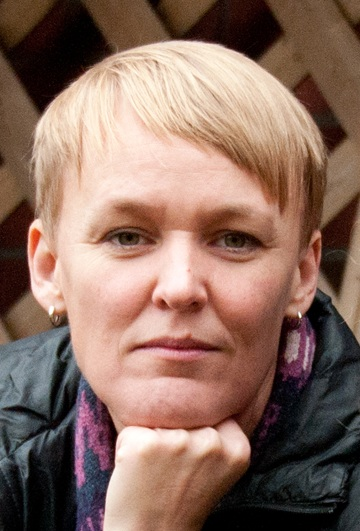
Maria Blom won the award in 2004 for Dalecarlians.

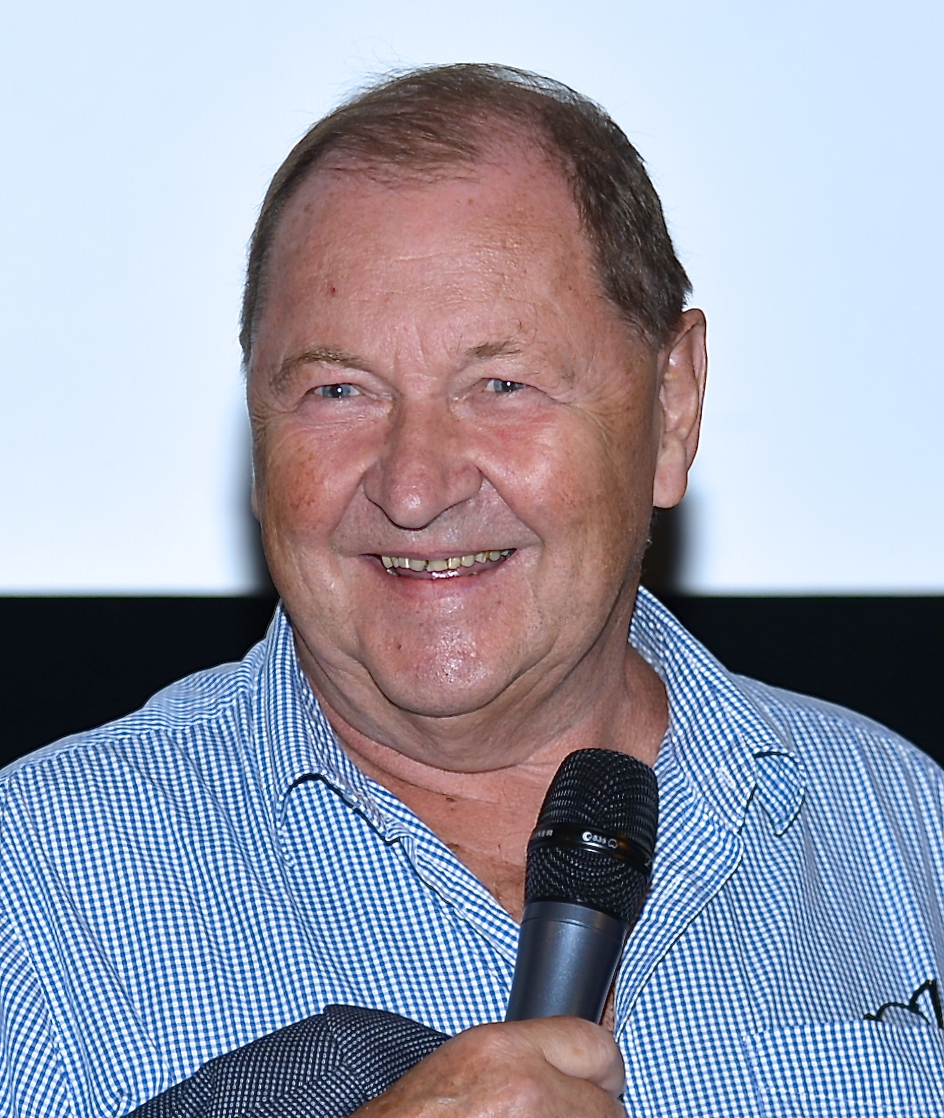
Roy Andersson won the award twice, the first for 2000's Songs from the Second Floor and 2007's You, the Living.

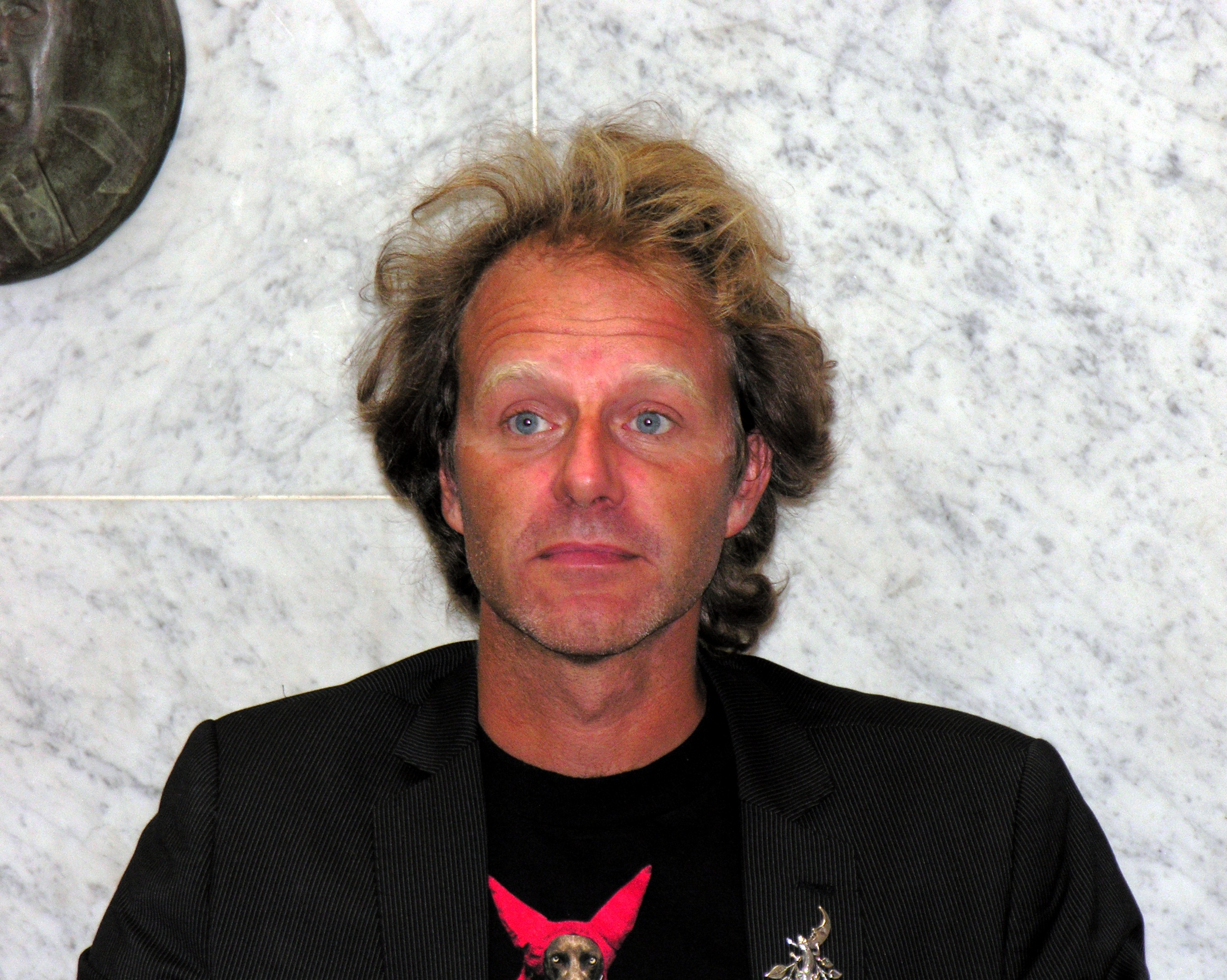
John Ajvide Lindqvist won the award in 2008 for Let the Right One In.

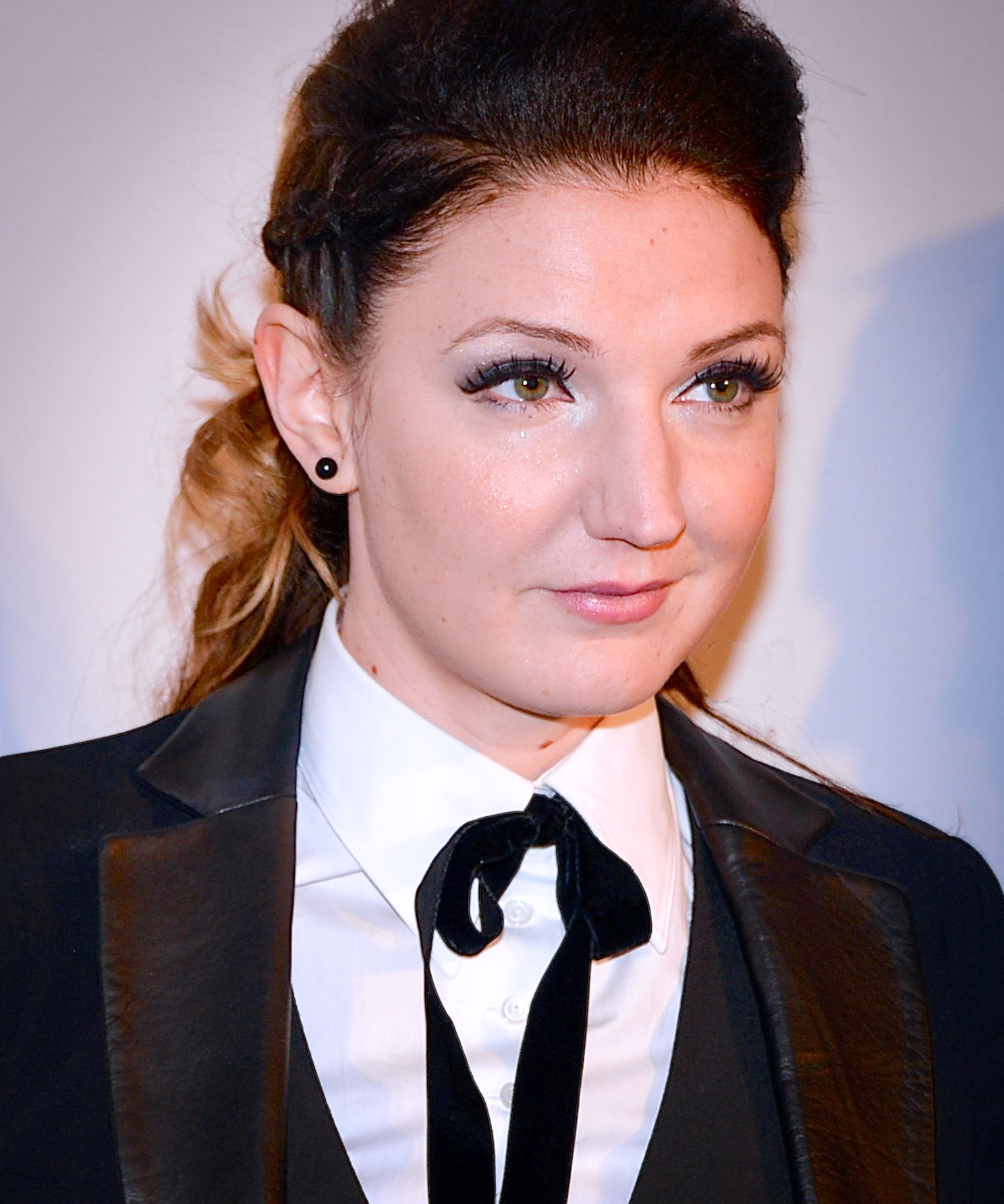
Gabriela Pichler won the award in 2012 for Eat Sleep Die.

Year	Screenwriter(s)	Film	Ref.
1988 (24th)	Bengt Danneborn‡ Lennart Persson‡	Det är långt till New York	
1989 (25th)	Stig Larsson‡ Åke Sandgren‡	The Miracle in Valby	
1990 (26th)	Kjell Grede‡	Good Evening, Mr. Wallenberg	
1991 (27th)	Clas Lindberg‡	Underground Secrets	
1991 (27th)	Marianne Goldman	Freud Leaving Home	
1991 (27th)	Per Olov Enquist	Il Capitano: A Swedish Requiem	
1992 (28th)	Ingmar Bergman‡	The Best Intentions	
1992 (28th)	Kjell-Åke Andersson; Magnus Nilsson	Night of the Orangutan	
1992 (28th)	Colin Nutley	House of Angels	
1993 (29th)	Daniel Alfredson‡ Jonas Cornell‡	The Man on the Balcony	
1993 (29th)	Niklas Rådström	Speak Up! It's So Dark	
1993 (29th)	Åke Sandgren	The Slingshot	
1994 (30th)	Peter Dalle‡ Rolf Börjlind‡	Yrrol	
1994 (30th)	Richard Hobert	The Hands	
1994 (30th)	Ulf Stark	Sixten	
1995 (31st)	Jonas Gardell‡	Like It Never Was Before	
1995 (31st)	Kristian Petri; Stig Larsson	Between Summers	
1995 (31st)	Hannes Holm; Måns Herngren	One in a Million	
1996 (32nd)	Per Olov Enquist‡	Hamsun	
1996 (32nd)	Harald Hamrell; Mats Wahl; Sara Heldt	Winter Bay	
1996 (32nd)	Björn Carlström; Kjell Sundvall	The Hunters	
1997 (33rd)	Annika Thor‡	Sanning eller konsekvens	
1997 (33rd)	Hans Renhäll	Tic Tac	
1997 (33rd)	Hannes Holm; Måns Herngren	Adam & Eva	
1998 (34th)	Lukas Moodysson‡	Show Me Love	
1998 (34th)	Anders Grönros	Glasblåsarns barn	
1998 (34th)	Klas Östergren; Lisa Ohlin	Waiting for the Tenor	
1999 (35th)	Ulf Stark‡	Tsatsiki, morsan och polisen	
1999 (35th)	Fredrik Lindström	Adult Behavior	
1999 (35th)	Malin Lagerlöf	Vägen ut	
2000 (36th)	Roy Andersson‡	Songs from the Second Floor	
2000 (36th)	Lukas Moodysson; Peter Birro	The New Country	
2000 (36th)	Lukas Moodysson	Together	
2001 (37th)	Hans Gunnarsson‡ Mikael Håfström‡	Days Like This	
2001 (37th)	Jacques Werup; Jan Troell	As White as in Snow	
2001 (37th)	Bille August	A Song for Martin	
2002 (38th)	Lukas Moodysson‡	Lilya 4-ever	
2002 (38th)	Peter Birro	We Can Be Heroes!	
2002 (38th)	Sara Heldt	Grabben i graven bredvid	
2003 (39th)	Björn Runge‡	Daybreak	
2003 (39th)	Hans Gunnarsson; Mikael Håfström	Evil	
2003 (39th)	Jonas Frykberg	Details	
2004 (40th)	Maria Blom‡	Dalecarlians	
2004 (40th)	Andres Lokko; Henrik Schyffert; Johan Rheborg; Jonas Inde; Martin Luuk; Robert Gustafsson; Tomas Alfredson	Four Shades of Brown	
2004 (40th)	Carin Pollak; Kay Pollak; Margaretha Pollak	As It Is in Heaven	
2005 (41st)	Lena Einhorn‡	Nina's Journey	
2005 (41st)	Josef Fares	Zozo	
2005 (41st)	Björn Runge	Mouth to Mouth	
2006 (42nd)	Hans Renhäll‡ Ylva Gustavsson‡	Kidz in da Hood	
2006 (42nd)	Fredrik Wenzel; Jesper Ganslandt	Falkenberg Farewell	
2006 (42nd)	Anders Nilsson; Joakim Hansson	When Darkness Falls	
2007 (43rd)	Roy Andersson‡	You, the Living	
2007 (43rd)	Johan Kling	Darling	
2007 (43rd)	Kjell Sundstedt	The New Man	
2008 (44th)	John Ajvide Lindqvist‡	Let the Right One In	
2008 (44th)	Erik Hemmendorff; Ruben Östlund	Involuntary	
2008 (44th)	Agneta Ulfsäter-Troell; Jan Troell; Niklas Rådström	Everlasting Moments	
2009 (45th)	Ulf Malmros‡	Bröllopsfotografen	
2009 (45th)	Teresa Fabik	Starring Maja	
2009 (45th)	Karin Arrhenius	The Girl	
2010 (46th)	Lisa Langseth‡	Pure	
2010 (46th)	Andreas Öhman; Jonathan Sjöberg	Simple Simon	
2010 (46th)	Lolita Ray; Pernilla August	Beyond	
2011 (47th)	Josefine Adolfsson‡ Lisa Aschan‡	She Monkeys	
2011 (47th)	Pernilla Oljelund	Stockholm East	
2011 (47th)	Ruben Östlund	Play	
2012 (48th)	Gabriela Pichler‡	Eat Sleep Die	
2012 (48th)	Malik Bendjelloul	Searching for Sugar Man	
2012 (48th)	Marietta von Hausswolff von Baumgarten	Call Girl	
2013 (49th)	Anna Odell‡	The Reunion	
2013 (49th)	Lisa Langseth	Hotell	
2013 (49th)	Cilla Jackert	Shed No Tears	
2014 (50th)	Ruben Östlund‡	Force Majeure	
2014 (50th)	Ester Martin Bergsmark; Eli Levén	Something Must Break	
2014 (50th)	Klas Östergren	Gentlemen	
2015 (51st)	Peter Grönlund‡	Drifters	
2015 (51st)	Sanna Lenken	My Skinny Sister	
2015 (51st)	Ronnie Sandahl	Underdog	
2016 (52nd)	Johannes Nyholm‡	The Giant	
2016 (52nd)	Jan Vierth; Anders Sparring	Bajsfilmen – Dolores och Gunellens värld	
2016 (52nd)	China Åhlander; Dragan Mitić; Goran Kapetanović	My Aunt in Sarajevo	
2016 (52nd)	Sara Nameth	The Yard	
2017 (53rd)	Amanda Kernell‡	Sami Blood	
2017 (53rd)	Maud Nycander; Jannike Åhlund; Kersti Grunditz Brennan	Citizen Schein	
2017 (53rd)	Can Demirtas; Ivica Zubak	A Hustler's Diary	
2017 (53rd)	Ruben Östlund	The Square	
2018 (54th)	Peter Grönlund‡	Goliath	
2018 (54th)	Gabriela Pichler; Jonas Hassen Khemiri	Amateurs	
2018 (54th)	Ali Abbasi, Isabella Eklöf and John Ajvide Lindqvist	Border	
2018 (54th)	Gunnar A.K. Järvstad	Garden Lane	
2019 (55th)	Levan Akin ‡	And Then We Danced	
2019 (55th)	Roy Andersson	About Endlessness	
2019 (55th)	Lisa Aschan	Call Mom!	
2019 (55th)	Erlend Loe	The Perfect Patient	
2020 (56th)	Uje Brandelius ‡	Spring Uje spring	
2020 (56th)	Josephine Bornebusch and Gunnar A.K. Järvstad	Orca	
2020 (56th)	Maria Bäck	Psychosis in Stockholm	
2020 (56th)	Amanda Kernell	Charter	
2021 (56th)	Nathalie Álvarez Mesén and Maria Camila Arias‡	Clara Sola	
2021 (56th)	Manuel Concha	Suedi	
2021 (56th)	Hogir Hirori	Sabaya	
2021 (56th)	Jan Vierth	Apstjärnan	

== See also ==
- Academy Award for Best Original Screenplay
- Academy Award for Best Adapted Screenplay
- BAFTA Award for Best Screenplay
- Golden Globe Award for Best Screenplay
