= Drömkåken =

- Promotional poster
- Directed by: Peter Dalle
- Written by: Peter Dalle; Bengt Palmers
- Based on: The Money Pit by: Richard Benjamin; David Giler; Lowell Ganz
- Produced by: Christer Abrahamsen
- Starring: Björn Skifs; Suzanne Reuter; Pierre Lindstedt
- Cinematography: Esa Vuorinen
- Music by: Bengt Palmers
- Release date: 28 October 1993 (Sweden)
- Running time: 101 minutes
- Country: Sweden
- Language: Swedish
- Box office: $3.2 million (Sweden)

Drömkåken (also titled The Dream House) is a Swedish comedy film which was released to cinemas in Sweden on 28 October 1993, directed by Peter Dalle. The film is a remake of the 1986 Tom Hanks comedy film The Money Pit, itself a remake of the 1948 Cary Grant comedy film Mr. Blandings Builds His Dream House.

== Plot ==
Göran surprises his wife and family by buying them a dream house. While renovating the house they find that is secretly even more dilapidated than they thought.

== Production ==
The villa featured in the film was built in 1907 and is located at Gryningsvägen 21 in the Solhem district in the borough Spånga-Tensta in the western part of Stockholm.

== Cast ==
- Björn Skifs as Göran
- Suzanne Reuter as Tina
- Zara Zetterqvist as Petra
- Mikael Håck as Anton
- Lena Nyman as Sanna
- Jan Malmsjö as The major
- Pierre Lindstedt as Ernst
- Gunnel Fred as Karin
- Pontus Gustafsson as Robert
- Johan Ulveson as Fille
- Claes Månsson as Mats
- Peter Dalle as Thomas
- Anders Ekborg as Plumber
- Johan Paulsen as Building worker in bathroom
- Sven-Åke Wahlström as Carpenter in kitchen
- Johan Rabaeus as Martin
- Anna-Lena Hemström as Malou
- Magnus Mark as Janne
- Robert Gustafsson as Asthma-patient
- Gunvor Pontén as Parrot's voice
- Hans Alfredson as Himself
- Tommy Körberg as Himself

== Reception ==
Drömkåken was the highest-grossing Swedish film of the year with a gross of $3.2 million, ranking sixth overall.
