= 31st Guldbagge Awards =

Annual Swedish film awards ceremony

- Date: February 12 1996
- Site: Cirkus, Stockholm, Sweden

Highlights
- Best Picture: Lust och fägring stor
- Most awards: Like It Never Was Before & Lust och fägring stor (3)
- Most nominations: Like It Never Was Before & Lust och fägring stor (5)

The 31st Guldbagge Awards ceremony, presented by the Swedish Film Institute, honored the best Swedish films of 1995, and took place on February 12, 1996. Lust och fägring stor directed by Bo Widerberg was presented with the award for Best Film.

== Winner and nominees ==
=== Awards ===
Best Film: Lust och fägring stor; One in a Million; Like It Never Was Before	Best Director: Bo Widerberg – Lust och fägring stor; Kristian Petri – Between Summers; Tomas Alfredson – Bert: The Last Virgin
Best Actress in a leading role: Gunilla Röör – Between Summers; Marika Lagercrantz – Lust och fägring stor; Stina Ekblad – Like It Never Was Before	Best Actor in a leading role: Loa Falkman – Like It Never Was Before; Peter Haber – White Lies; Johan Widerberg – Lust och fägring stor
Best Actress in a Supporting role: Sif Ruud – Big Men, Little Men and Like It Never Was Before; Birgitta Andersson – Jönssonligans största kupp; Frida Hallgren – 30:e november	Best Actor in a Supporting role: Tomas von Brömssen – Lust och fägring stor; Jonas Karlsson – 30:e november; Thommy Berggren – Stora och små män
Best Screenplay: Jonas Gardell – Like It Never Was Before; Kristian Petri, Stig Larsson – Between Summers; Hannes Holm, Måns Herngren – One in a Million	Best Cinematography: Jan Röed – Atlanten; Göran Nilsson – Stora och små män; Stefan Kullänger – Sommaren
Best Foreign Film: (North Macedonia) Before the Rain – Milcho Manchevski; (United States) Bullets over Broadway – Woody Allen; (Italy) Lamerica – Gianni Amelio	Creative Achievement Award: Hasse Ekman
The Ingmar Bergman Award: Rune Waldekranz
