= Lorry (TV series) =

Swedish television comedy series

- Directed by: Kjell Sundvall; Peter Dalle
- Starring: Ewamaria Björkström; Peter Dalle; Lena Endre; Gunnel Fred; Claes Månsson; Suzanne Reuter; Gunilla Röör; Stefan Sauk; Ulla Skoog; Johan Ulveson
- Country of origin: Sweden
- Original language: Swedish
- No. of seasons: 4
- No. of episodes: 28 (incl. 2 specials)

Production
- Producer: Tommy Bennwik

Original release
- Network: SVT1
- Release: 1989 – 1995

Lorry is a Swedish comedy TV series that premiered 19 October 1989 on SVT1, broadcast from restaurant Lorry in Sundbyberg. In the ensemble were Peter Dalle, Johan Ulveson, Claes Månsson, Lena Endre, Gunnel Fred, Gunilla Röör, Suzanne Reuter, Ulla Skoog, Evamaria Björkström and Stefan Sauk (sometimes known together as the Lorry gang, Swedish: Lorrygänget). They have also done a show on the Tyrol in 1991 and the movie Yrrol in 1994.

The series was said to turn to a "divorced and mature youth", which was also the explanation for having the same title as a dancehall in Sundbyberg. Peter Dalle was the central figure behind Lorry. He wrote the most part of the material and also directed the fourth and last season; the three first seasons were directed by Kjell Sundvall. Carsten Palmaer, Sven-Hugo Persson and Rolf Börjlind also contributed to the script. The Lorry gang became famous for their sharp, offensive and politically incorrect humor, which even led to pressed charges to the broadcasting commission.

The TV series's opening credits song was Earth, Wind & Fire's hit "In the Stone".

The Lorry gang returned in a variety show at the Oscar Theater in Stockholm and it became a huge hit with the audience in 2001–2002. Parts of the show were sketches taken from the TV series.

== Lorry on DVD ==
Season 1-4 of the TV-series was released on DVD on 17 July 2010.
