= Strul =

1988 Swedish action comedy film

- Directed by: Jonas Frick
- Written by: Bengt Palmers; Björn Skifs
- Produced by: Waldemar Bergendahl; Jan Marnell
- Starring: Björn Skifs; Gunnel Fred; Johan Ulveson; Stefan Sauk
- Cinematography: Stefan Kullänger
- Release date: 25 February 1988 (Sweden)
- Running time: 101 minutes
- Country: Sweden
- Language: Swedish

Strul is a 1988 Swedish action comedy film directed by Jonas Frick.

== Synopsis ==
Conny is a chemistry teacher who is framed for drug possession. Unable to prove his innocence he ends up in prison. When he finds a secret exit, some inmates "persuade" him to participate in a heist. Things become extremely hectic as he tries to prove his innocence as well as "helping" his inmates. When Conny thinks that it could not possibly get any worse he meets Susanne, a policewoman...

== Cast and characters ==
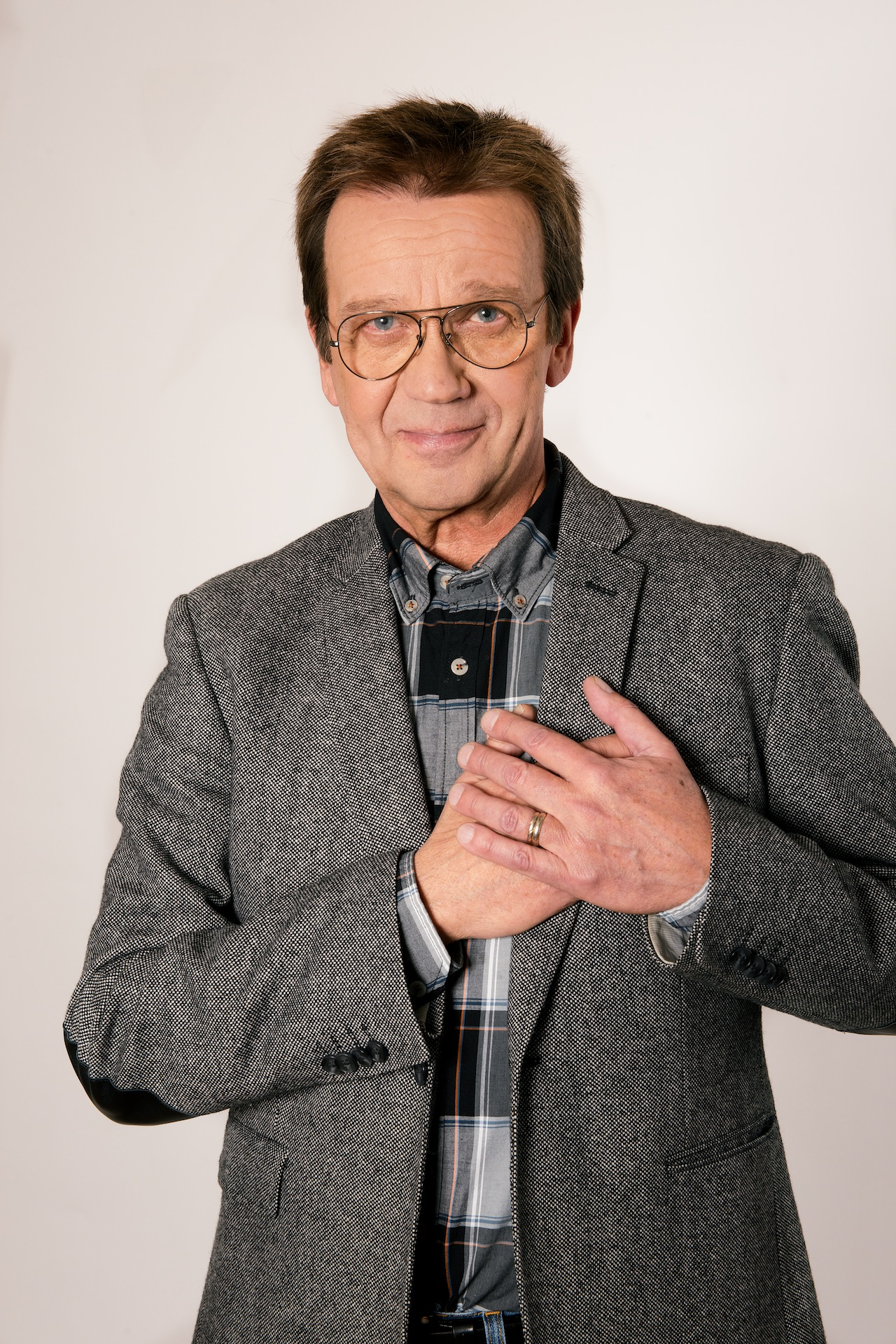
Björn Skifs (pictured in 2014), who portrayed Conny Rundqvist.
- Björn Skifs as Conny Rundqvist
- Gunnel Fred as Susanne Lindh
- Magnus Nilsson as Gränges
- Gino Samil as Hjelm
- Johan Ulveson as Pege
- Mikael Druker as Norinder
- Stefan Sauk as Alf Brinke
- Kåre Sigurdson as Sörman
- Hans Rosenfeldt as Glenn
- Peter Palmér as Hans Ekelund
- Thorsten Flinck as Prison guard
- Maud Hyttenberg as Old lady
