= Swedish National Academy of Mime and Acting =

The National Academy of Mime and Acting (NAMA) (Swedish: Teaterhögskolan i Stockholm), was a school in Stockholm, Sweden for acting and mime. This institution was also known under additional different names in English, including Stockholm University College of Acting and Stockholm Academy of Dramatic Arts.

The school offered programmes in acting and mime, as well as various shorter courses.

The school originated in the acting school founded in 1787 on the initiative of King Gustav III and long appended to the Royal Dramatic Theatre. The Royal Dramatic Training Academy produced many later famous actors and directors, including Greta Garbo, Gustaf Molander, Alf Sjöberg, Ingrid Bergman, Signe Hasso, Gunnar Björnstrand, Max von Sydow and Bibi Andersson. In 1964 the school separated from the Royal Dramatic Theatre (initiated by Ingmar Bergman who claimed the theatre no longer had room for it in the building). The acting schools affiliated with the city theatres in Malmö and Gothenburg were made independent state institutions at the same time, and one which existed in Norrköping/Linköping was closed down.

The Stockholm school was known as the National Swedish School of Acting, Stockholm (Note: National Swedish School of Acting, Stockholm, the National Academy of Dramatic Art or the National Theatre Academy.) (Swedish: Statens scenskola or Scenskolan) from 1964 until 1977, when the name was finally changed to Teaterhögskolan i Stockholm. Here famous actors such as Peter Stormare, Pernilla August and Lena Olin were trained. The Malmö and Gothenburg schools were merged with the universities of Lund and Gothenburg, respectively, but the Stockholm institution remained independent.

On 1 January 2011 the school merged with the Swedish Institute of Dramatic Art to become Stockholm Academy of Dramatic Arts.

== Selected tutors (from 2005-) ==
- Stina Ekblad, Professor in the Performing Arts
- Krister Henriksson, Professor in The Performing Art
- Matthew Allen, Actor training, Acting for the camera

== Selected students (by graduation year) ==
=== 1969 ===
- Tomas Bolme
- Louise Edlind

=== 1970 ===
- Peter Harryson

=== 1971 ===
- Lena-Pia Bernhardsson

=== 1972 ===
- Tomas Pontén
- Basia Frydman

=== 1973 ===
- Kjell Bergqvist

=== 1974 ===
- Thomas Oredsson

=== 1975 ===
- Ulf Dohlsten
- Marika Lindström

=== 1976 ===
- Robert Sjöblom

=== 1977 ===
- Pontus Gustafson
- Jacob Nordenson
- Rico Rönnbäck
- Jan Waldekranz

=== 1978 ===
- Lennart R. Svensson

=== 1979 ===
- Dan Ekborg
- Lena Olin

=== 1980 ===
- Babben Larsson

=== 1981 ===
- Peter Stormare
- Jessica Zandén
- Maria Johansson
- Sissela Kyle
- Tomas Norström

=== 1982 ===
- Pernilla August (as Pernilla Östergren)
- Gunnel Fred

=== 1984 ===
- Thorsten Flinck
- Peter Dalle
- Claes Månsson

=== 1985 ===
- Pia Johansson
- Marie Richardson

=== 1986 ===
- Gunilla Röör
- Lena Endre

=== 1987 ===
- Jakob Eklund
- Douglas Johansson
- Jan Mybrand

=== 1988 ===
- Helena Bergström
- Katarina Ewerlöf
- Benny Haag

=== 1990 ===
- Reuben Sallmander
- Anna-Lena Hemström
- Niklas Hjulström

=== 1991 ===
- Figge Norling
- Torkel Petersson
- Ann-Sofi Rase

=== 1992 ===
- Simon Norrthon

=== 1994 ===
- Melinda Kinnaman
- Elin Klinga
- Bernard Bragg

=== 1995 ===
- Gustaf Hammarsten

=== 1997 ===
- Maria Bonnevie
- Alexandra Rapaport

=== 1998 ===
- Jonas Karlsson
- Magnus Krepper
- Eva Röse
- Tanja Svedjeström

=== 1999 ===
- Lina Englund
- Irma Schultz Keller
- Lo Wahl

=== 2000 ===
- Martin Aliaga

=== 2001 ===
- Sofia Bach
- Suzanna Dilber
- Sofia Helin
- Vanna Rosenberg
- Joakim Nätterqvist

=== 2002 ===
- Katarina Cohen
- Emil Forselius
- Henrik Norlén
- Jonatan Rodriguez

=== 2003 ===
- David Dencik
- Göran Gillinger
- Gustaf Skarsgård

=== 2004 ===
- Ellen Mattsson

=== 2005 ===
- Petra Hultgren

=== 2006 ===
- Liv Mjönes

=== 2007 ===
- Hanna Alström
- Hannes Meidal
- Nina Zanjani

=== 2008 ===
- Tove Edfeldt
