= Tomas Pontén =

Swedish actor (1946–2015)

- Born: Carl Axel Thomas Pontén; 29 January 1946; Skövde, Sweden
- Died: 15 September 2015 (aged 69); Stockholm, Sweden
- Occupation: Director
- Years active: 1975–2004
- Partner: Suzanne Reuter (1983–2000)
- Children: 3

Tomas Pontén (born Carl Axel Thomas Pontén; 29 January 1946 – 15 September 2015) was a Swedish actor and director.

== Biography ==
Pontén was born in Skövde, Sweden to Colonel Birger Pontén and Ellen, née Nordlöf. He was the younger brother to the Dr. Jan Pontén and fashion designer Gunilla Pontén. He was also the nephew of engineer Ruben Pontén and cousin of actor Gunvor Pontén. He passed his student examination in 1967 and studied at Statens scenskola in Stockholm from 1969 to 1972. Pontén worked at the Royal Dramatic Theatre ("Dramaten") from 1972.

== Personal life ==
Pontén never married but was partners from 1983 to 2000 with Suzanne Reuter. They had three sons. Pontén died on 15 September 2015 after a long illness.

== Selected filmography ==
=== Film ===
- 1975 - The White Wall
- 1976 - Near and Far Away
- 1979 - Gå på vattnet om du kan
- 1994 - Sommarmord
- 1999 - Dödsklockan
- 2001 - Sprängaren
- 2002 - Olivia Twist (TV)
- 2004 - Hotet

=== TV ===
- 1977 - Ärliga blå ögon
- 1979 - Selambs
- 1980 - Zoo Story
- 1983 - Colombe
- 1983 - Profitörerna
- 1989 - Det var då...
- 1992 - The Emperor of Portugallia
- 1995 – Radioskugga (also in 1997)
- 1999 - Browalls
- 2000 - Skärgårdsdoktorn
- 2002 - Olivia Twist

=== Plays ===
- 2005 – The Provost in Measure for Measure by William Shakespeare, directed by Yannis Houvardas, Royal Dramatic Theatre
