= Suzanne Reuter =

Swedish actress

- Born: Suzanne Alexandra Maria Reuter; 14 June 1952 (age 74); Stockholm, Sweden
- Occupation: Actress
- Years active: 1978–present
- Partner: Tomas Pontén (1983–2000)
- Children: 3

Suzanne Alexandra Maria Reuter (Swedish pronunciation: [sɵˈsanː ˈrœ̌jtɛr]; born 14 June 1952) is a Swedish actress and comedian. She has appeared in more than fifty films over a career spanning from 1978.

== Biography ==
Suzanne Reuter is the daughter of engineer Terje Reuter (1924–2005) and the actress Bojan Westin (1926–2013). After finishing her studies at the Teaterhögskolan in Gothenburg in 1979, she worked at the Östgötateatern between 1980 and 1983. In 1978, she got her first TV role in the SVT comedy series Skyll inte på mig! opposite Magnus Härenstam and Brasse Brännström. She then appeared in different SVT productions such as Razzel, Nöjesmassakern and Nöjeskompaniet. In 1983, she made her film debut in the film Lyckans ost directed by Kjell Sundvall.

For a wider audience Reuter became known for her role in the comedy series Lorry and the subsequent film with the same name. In 1992, she landed a leading role in the series Rederiet playing the character Renate Dahlén. In 1994, she played Lena Svensson in the comedy series Svensson, Svensson opposite Allan Svensson, the series returned with more episodes in 2007 and 2008.

She also had leading roles first in the comedy series Cleo and the drama series Drottningoffret as well as the film Ogifta par. She won a Guldbaggen award for Best leading role for her role in Yrrol. Between 1999 and 2000, she and Ulla Skoog starred in the comedy sketch show Reuter & Skoog which was broadcast on SVT.

In 2019, she appeared as the quiz master in the TV4 game show Fångarna på fortet. She had the role of Helga Löwander in the series Vår tid är nu.

Reuter has also worked in theater, such as Hotelliggaren på Chinateatern, Maken till fruar at Oscarsteatern and the musical Rivierans guldgossar at Cirkus in Stockholm. In 2008, she had a role in the play Blommor av stål (en:Flowers of Steel) at Vasateatern. In 2024, she appeared in the Kanal 5 series Över Atlanten where she and other celebrities crossed the Atlantic Ocean sailing.

== Filmography ==
=== Film ===
Year	Title	Role	Notes	Ref.
1989	Hoppa högst	Stig's Mother	Short film	
1993	Drömkåken	Tina Carlgren		
1994	Yrrol			
1997	Sanning eller konsekvens	Gunilla		
1999	In Bed with Santa	Carina		
2007	Solstorm	Kristina Strandgård		

=== Television ===
Year	Title	Role	Notes	Ref.
1978	Skyll inte på mig	Gunilla		
1981	Häpnadsväktarna			
1981	Det finns inga smålänningar	Eva Tunkvist		
1982	Ni som behagar	Rosalinda		
1983	Farmor och vår Herre	Signe		
1983	Colombe	Colombe		
1983	Distrikt 5	Nickie		
1983	München-Atén	Sarah		
1984	Lykkeland	Vera Andersson		
1984	Nya himlar och en ny jord	Vendela Hebbe		
1990	Ebba och Didrik	Mamma		
1990	Rosenbaddarna	Lillemor Ågren		
1991	Sunes jul	Helene		
1992–1995	Lorry		15 episodes	
1992–2001	Rederiet	Renate Dahlén	49 episodes	
1994–2008	Svensson, Svensson	Lena Svensson	49 episodes	
1995	Som löven i Vallombrosa	Lena		
1999	En klass för sig	Lena		
1999-2001	Reuter & Skoog			
2002–2003	Cleo	Cleopatra 'Cleo' Andersson	27 episodes	
2005	Hotelliggaren	Pia Wallén		
2006	Kronprinsessan	Elisabeth Meyer		
2008	Kungamordet	Elisabeth Meyer		
2009	Harry & Charles	Kronprinsesse Louise		
2009-2010	Guds tre flickor	Gud		
2010-2011	Drottningoffret	Elisabeth Meyer		
2015	Modus	Viveka Wallin		
2015	Fröken Frimans krig	Ebba von Rettig		
2017-2020	Vår tid är nu	Helga Löwander		
2019-2020	Fångarna på fortet	Madame Fouras		
2019	Panik i tomteverkstan	Medlem i tomterådet	Julkalender	
2019	Ture Sventon och Bermudatriangelns hemligheten	Ville Vesslas mor		
2020	Hamilton	Maria Hamilton		
2022	Äntligen!	Eva Forss		
2024	Jana: Marked for Life	Monica Grandkvist		

== Awards ==
- Guldbagge Award for Best Actress in a Leading Role (1994) for Yrrol
- Monte-Carlo TV Festival, Outstanding Actress of the Year - Comedy (2004) for Cleo
