= Gunvor Pontén =

Swedish actress (1929–2023)

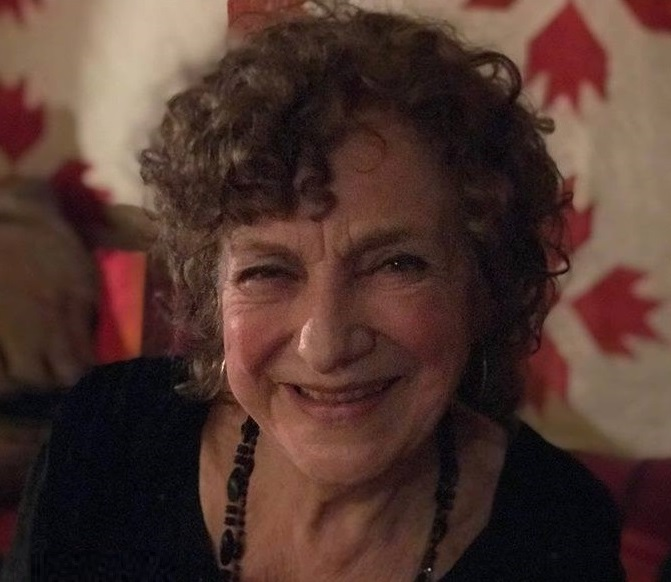
- Pontén in 2018
- Born: Gunvor Margareta Pontén; 11 February 1929; Stockholm, Sweden
- Died: 16 February 2023 (aged 94)
- Occupation: Actress
- Years active: 1949–2017

Gunvor Margareta Pontén (11 February 1929 – 16 February 2023) was a Swedish actress who graduated from the Royal Dramatic Training Academy in 1954. She appeared in over 50 films and television shows starting in 1949. She starred in the film Leva på 'Hoppet', which won the Silver Bear (Comedies) award at the 1st Berlin International Film Festival.

Gunvor Pontén was the daughter of Ruben Pontén and Dagny Carlqvist. She was also a cousin of fashion designer Gunilla Pontén and actor Tomas Pontén. After graduating in 1948 she started acting school at Terserus teaterskola 1948–1950, and the Royal Dramatic Training Academy 1951–1954. She worked within the field of acting at Stadsteatern, Folkteatern in Gothenburg and Oscarsteatern.

Pontén died on 16 February 2023, at the age of 94.

== Filmography ==
- 2019 - Toy Story 4 (voice)
- 2017 - Vaiana (voice)
- 2013 - Tyskungen
- 2013 - Orion
- 2009 - Psalm 21
- 2006 - Kärringen därnere
- 2001 - Atlantis: The Lost Empire (voice)
- 1997 - Tic Tac
- 1993 - Glädjekällan
- 1993 - Drömkåken
- 1993 - Lotta flyttar hemifrån
- 1993 - Brandbilen som försvann
- 1984 - Splittring
- 1983 - Raskenstam
- 1981 - Göta kanal eller Vem drog ur proppen?
- 1980 - Lämna mej inte ensam
- 1975 - Ungkarlshotellet
- 1974 - Vita nejlikan eller Den barmhärtige sybariten
- 1971 - Lockfågeln
- 1961 - Rififi in Stockholm
- 1957 - Enslingen Johannes
- 1956 - Egen ingång
- 1955 - The Unicorn
- 1955 - Violence
- 1955 - Flottans muntergökar
- 1955 - The Dance Hall
- 1955 - Karusellen i fjällen
- 1955 - Mord, lilla vän
- 1954 - Young Summer
- 1954 - Our Father and the Gypsy
- 1953 - The Glass Mountain
- 1953 - The Chieftain of Göinge
- 1953 - Resan till dej
- 1953 - I dur och skur
- 1952 - 69:an, sergeanten och jag
- 1951 - Hon dansade en sommar
- 1951 - Living on 'Hope'
- 1950 - Den vita katten
- 1949 - Playing Truant
