= Illusive Tracks =

- Theatrical release poster
- Directed by: Peter Dalle
- Written by: Peter Dalle
- Produced by: Patrick Ryborn
- Starring: Peter Dalle; Gösta Ekman; Robert Gustafsson
- Music by: Adam Nordén
- Distributed by: Buena Vista International
- Release date: 25 December 2003 (Sweden)
- Running time: 100 minutes
- Country: Sweden
- Language: Swedish

Illusive Tracks (Swedish: Skenbart – en film om tåg) is a Swedish dark comedy thriller film which was released to cinemas in Sweden on 25 December 2003, directed by Peter Dalle, starring Peter Dalle, Gustaf Hammarsten, Robert Gustafsson, Gösta Ekman, Lars Amble and others.

The time is right after World War II, before Christmas of 1945. The story revolves around the passengers on a train heading from Stockholm non-stop to Berlin, and includes murder, adultery, religion, Santa Claus and a very angry train conductor.

The film is in black and white to give it a more dramatic atmosphere. All of the scenes depicting Stockholm Central Station were filmed at the Krylbo railway station to resemblance the 1940s look of Stockholm.

== Cast ==
- Gustaf Hammarsten as Gunnar
- Magnus Roosmann as Henry
- Anna Björk as Marie
- Kristina Törnqvist as Karin
- Robert Gustafsson as The Soldier
- Peter Dalle as The Conductor
- Lena Nyman as Märit
- Gösta Ekman as Pompe
- Lars Amble as Sixten
- Jakob Stefansson as The Waiter
- Claes Ljungmark as The Bartender
- Lakke Magnusson as The Head Waiter
- Marie Göranzon as The Nun
- Hanna Ekman as Young Nun
- Ella Bjurling as Girl in White Cape

== See also ==
- List of Christmas films
