= In the Presence of a Clown =

- Written by: Ingmar Bergman
- Directed by: Ingmar Bergman
- Starring: Erland Josephson; Börje Ahlstedt; Marie Richardson; Pernilla August; Ingmar Bergman (uncredited)
- Country of origin: Sweden
- Original language: Swedish

Production
- Producers: Måns Reuterswärd; Pia Ehrnvall
- Cinematography: Tony Forsberg; Irene Wiklund
- Editor: Sylvia Ingemarsson
- Running time: 119 minutes

Original release
- Network: Sveriges Television
- Release: 1 November 1997

In the Presence of a Clown (Swedish: Larmar och gör sig till) is a television film by Ingmar Bergman, recorded for Swedish television in 1997 with Bergman as a director. It was screened in the Un Certain Regard section of the 1998 Cannes Film Festival. It tells the story of a professor named Carl, who has been found guilty of attempted murder and sentenced to treatment in a mental ward. In the hospital he befriends a man named Osvald, and they attempt to make and promote a film.

The film was produced for Sveriges Television from Bergman's 1994 play of the same title.

== Cast ==
- Börje Ahlstedt – Uncle Carl Åkerblom
- Marie Richardson – Pauline Thibault
- Erland Josephson – Osvald Vogler
- Pernilla August – Karin Bergman
- Anita Björk – Anna Åkerblom
- Agneta Ekmanner – Rigmor the clown
- Lena Endre – Märta Lundberg
- Gunnel Fred – Emma Vogler
- Gerthi Kulle – Sister Stella
- Johan Lindell – Johan Egerman
- Peter Stormare – Petrus Landahl
- Folke Asplund – Fredrik Blom
- Anna Björk – Mia Falk
- Inga Landgré – Alma Berglund
- Alf Nilsson – Stefan Larsson
