= Flickan vid stenbänken =

- Based on: Skuggan över stenbänken...och de vita skuggorna i skogen Skuggornas barn by Maria Gripe
- Written by: Marianne Ahrne; Bertrand Hurault
- Directed by: Marianne Ahrne
- Starring: Anna Edlund; Anna Björk; Lena T. Hansson
- Composer: Elia Cmiral
- Country of origin: Sweden
- Original language: Swedish
- No. of episodes: 9

Production
- Producers: Lasse Lundberg; Bert Sundberg
- Cinematography: Lasse Dahlqvist; Hans Welin
- Editor: Marianne Ahrne
- Running time: 30 min

Original release
- Release: 14 January – 11 March 1989

Flickan vid stenbänken is a Swedish 1989 TV series in nine episodes directed by Marianne Ahrne starring Anna Edlund, Anna Björk and Lena T. Hansson. The series was based on Maria Gripe's books Skuggan över stenbänken (1982), ...och de vita skuggorna i skogen (1984) and Skuggornas barn (1986).

== Cast ==
- Anna Björk as Berta
- Anna Edlund as Carolin
- Lena T. Hansson as Mother
- Bertil Lundén as Father
- Magnus Sagrén as Roland
- Frida Hesselgren as Nadja
- Majlis Granlund as Svea
- Inga Landgré as Grandmother
- Gerhard Hoberstorfer as Arild
- Gaëlle Legrand as Rosilda
- Viveca Lindfors as Storråda
- Anita Björk as Amalia
- Hans Polster as Axel
- Chatarina Larsson as Vera
- Marika Lindström as Sofia
- Georg Årlin as the coachman
