= Lena Endre =

Swedish actress (born 1955)

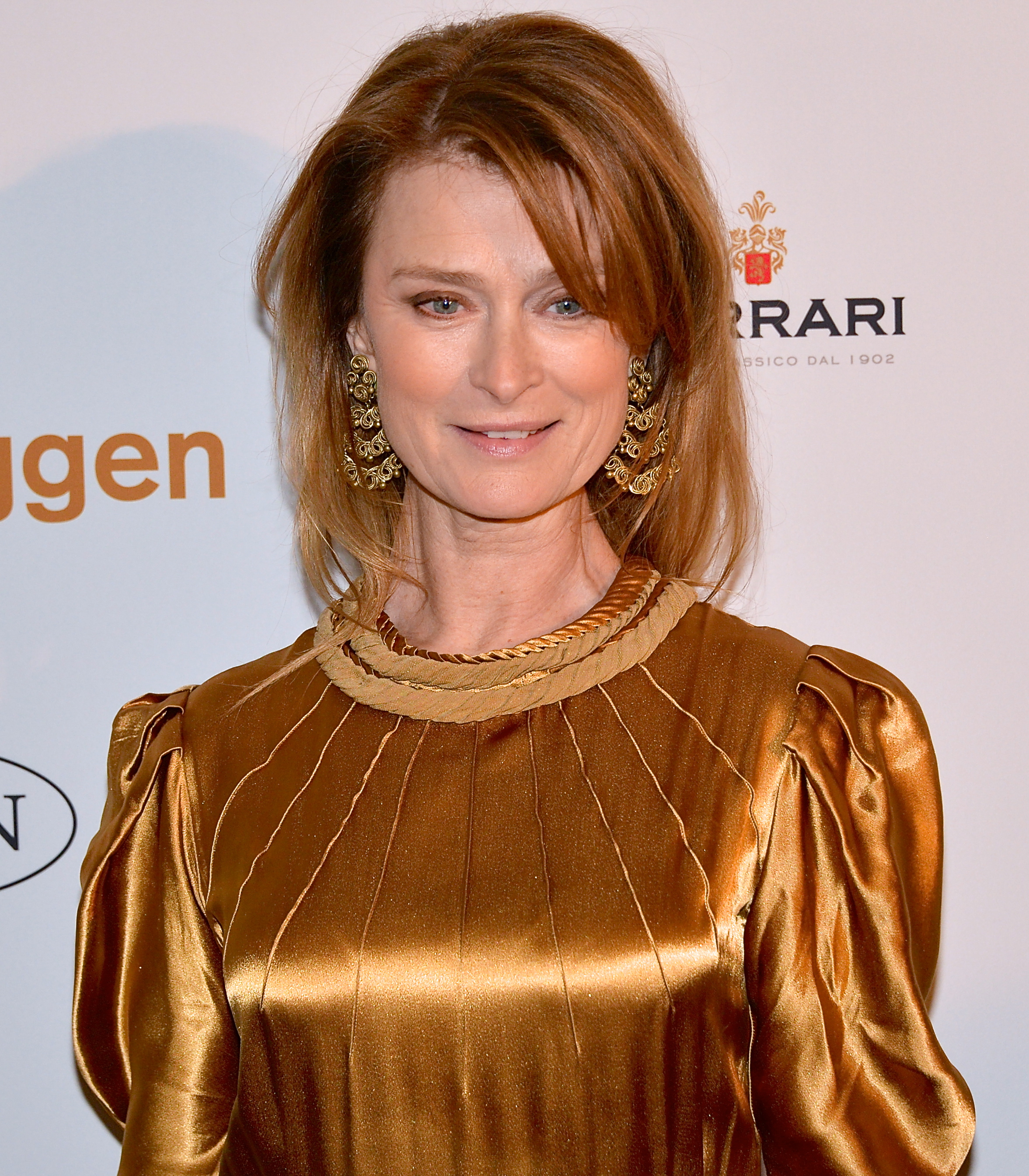
- Endre at the 2013 Guldbagge Award.
- Born: 8 July 1955 (age 71); Lidingö, Sweden
- Occupation: Actress

Lena Endre (born 8 July 1955) is a Swedish actress of film and television, primarily in the Swedish and Norwegian markets, known for her parts in the Liv Ullmann film Trolösa (2000), and the Millennium series of films (e.g., The Girl with the Dragon Tattoo), based on the Stieg Larsson books. Endre made her English-language debut in 2012, in Paul Thomas Anderson's movie The Master, starring Joaquin Phoenix and Philip Seymour Hoffman.

== Early life and education ==
Lena Endre was born on 8 July 1955 in Lidingö, Stockholm County, to Beryl (née Forsman) and Ants Endre. She has two brothers, and grew up in Härnösand, Ångermanland, and Trollbäcken, Tyresö.

She first studied marine biology, before dropping out to work at a record store. She participated in amateur theatre during this time. She acted as a part of the Teater Sputnik and Inge Waern's Theatre Studio theatre groups in 1979. In 1983, she was accepted to the Swedish National Academy of Mime and Acting (Scenskolan), where one of her classmates was Gunilla Röör, graduating in 1986.

== Career ==
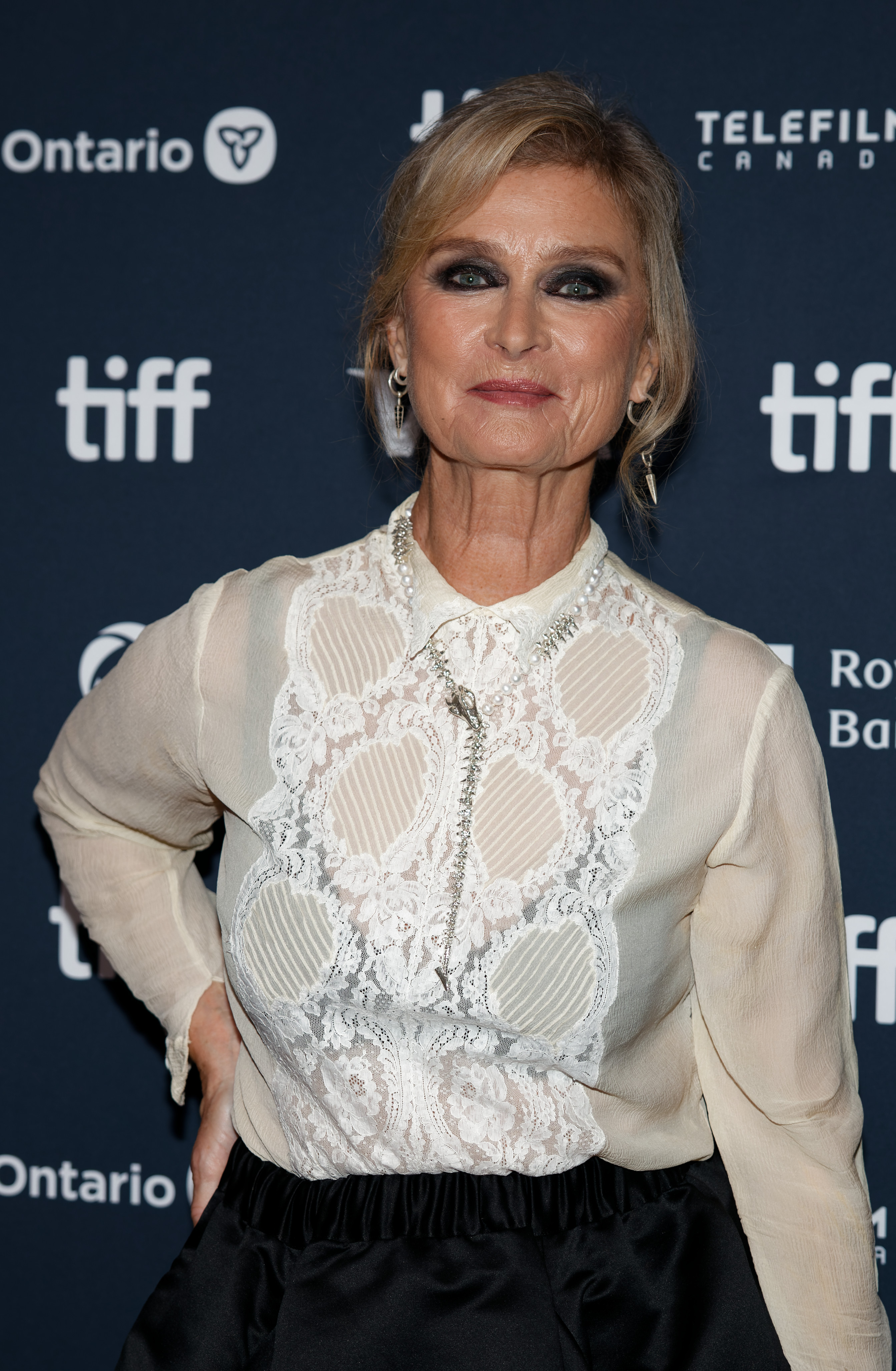
Endre at the 2024 Toronto International Film Festival

Endre had her breakthrough in the Swedish television series Varuhuset (The Department Store) and Lorry in the 1980s. She left the cast of The Department Store after identifying too closely with her character. Endre was hired by the Royal Dramatic Theatre in 1987. Prior to her role on The Department Store, she had a small part in the film The Inside Man in 1984.

Since then she has acted in a number of television and film productions, primarily in Sweden and Norway.

She is known for her part as Marianne in the Liv Ullmann drama film about a love triangle, Trolösa (2000), as well as her role as Katarina, the love interest for Wallander in the second TV series of that name. Endre also appeared in two films by Danish director Simon Staho, Dag och Natt (2004) and Himlens Hjärta (2008), for which she was nominated as Best Leading Actress at the Swedish film awards, "Guldbagge". More recently, Endre played Erika Berger, editor of the fictional investigative periodical Millenium in the trilogy of films—The Girl with the Dragon Tattoo, The Girl Who Played with Fire, and The Girl Who Kicked the Hornets' Nest (all 2009)—based on the eponymous trio of Stieg Larsson books.

Endre made her English-language debut in Paul Thomas Anderson's movie The Master, alongside Joaquin Phoenix, Philip Seymour Hoffman, Amy Adams, and Laura Dern.

Endre reprised her role as Marianne in the in the 2025 television drama series Faithless (Trolösa), based on the 2000 film His co-stars include Jesper Christensen and August Wittgenstein as her husband and lover, as well as Frida Gustavsson as the younger version of the character, and Gustav Lindh as the younger version of David. The series premiered on SVT on 26 January 2025, and was scheduled to be released on other platforms, including Apple TV.

== Other activities ==
In 2026, Endre joined TV4 Rising Star Award jury at the 2026 Stockholm International Film Festival held in November.

== Awards ==
Lena Endre has received many awards, including:

- 1989: Gunn Wållgren Scholarship
- 1993: Eugene O'Neill Award
- 1997: Guldbagge Award for Best Actress in a Supporting Role, for her role in Jerusalem
- 1998: Svenska Dagbladets Thalia Prize
- 1999: Swedish Academy Theatre Prize
- 2001: Guldbagge Award for Best Actress in a Leading Role for Trolösa
- 2002: Royal Medal (Litteris et Artibus)

== Personal life ==
Endre first married Malte Ekblom in 1979, which ended in divorce in 1981. In 1982 she married Vjeko Benzon; they divorced in 1985.

She was married to Swedish film director Richard Hobert for some years, appearing in many of his films, including Run for Your Life, Ögat, and Everybody Loves Alice (2002).

== Filmography ==
Year	Title	Role	Notes
1984	The Inside Man	Astrid	
1987	Mio in the Land of Faraway	Mrs. Lundin	Swedish version; Voice
1987–1988	Varuhuset (TV)	Ingrid	29 episodes
1988	Vendetta i en etta	Eva	Short film
1988	The Visitors	Sara	
1988	Kråsnålen	Monika Nilsson	5 episodes
1989	Istanbul	Ingrid	
1989	Lorry (TV)	Medverkande	6 episodes
1990	Pelle flyttar till Komfusenbo	Mamma	
1992	The Best Intentions	Frida Strandberg	
1992	Sunday's Children	Karin Bergman	
1993	Den ena kärleken och den andra	Tini	
1993	Hedda Gabler	Hedda Gabler	
1994	Yrrol	Begravningsdeltagare	
1995	Kristin Lavransdatter	Eline Ormsdatter	
1996	Jerusalem	Barbro	
1996	Juloratoriet	Solveig Nordensson	
1996	The Return of Jesus, Part II	Unknown role	
1997	Expectations	Margareta	
1997	Run for Your Life	Ingrid	
1997	Unmarried Couples: A Comedy That Will Break You Up	Marie	Swedish title: Ogifta par – en film som skiljer sig
1997	In the Presence of a Clown	Märta Lundberg	
1998	Från regnormarnas liv	Hanne Louise Heiberg	
1998	Sanna ögonblick	Viivi	
1998	The Eye	Ingrid	Swedish Title: Ogat
1999	Fatimas tredje hemlighet	Poesikvinnan	Short film
1999	Jävla Kajsa	Bettan	6 episodes
2000	The Birthday	Ingrid	
2000	Faithless	Marianne	
2000	Gossip	Rebecca Olsson-Frigårdh	
2002	Music for Weddings and Funerals	Sara	Swedish title: Musikk for bryllup og begravelser
2002	Everybody Loves Alice	Anna	Swedish title: Alla älskar Alice
2003	Voice of Silence	Unknown role	Swedish title: Tystnadens röst; Short film
2004	Three Suns	Hanna Ride	Swedish title: Tre solar
2004	Aftermath	Vivi	Swedish title: Lad de små børn...
2004	Day and Night	Anna	Swedish title: Dag och natt
2005	Harry's Daughters	Marie	Swedish title: Harrys döttrar
2006	Göta kanal 2 – Kanalkampen	Vonna	
2008	Himlens Hjärta	Susanna	
2009	Angel	Unknown role	Uncredited
2009	The Girl with the Dragon Tattoo	Erika Berger	Swedish title: Män som hatar kvinnor
2009	The Girl Who Played with Fire	Erika Berger	Swedish title: Flickan som lekte med elden
2009	The Girl Who Kicked the Hornets' Nest	Erika Berger	Swedish title: Luftslottet som sprängdes
2009–2010	Wallander (Swedish TV series)	Katarina Ahlsell	13 episodes
2010	Millennium	Erika Berger	6 episodes
2010	Limbo	Charlotte	
2011	With Every Heartbeat	Elisabeth	Alternative title: Kiss Me; also producer
2012	The Master	Mrs. Solstad	
2012	Coacherna	Carina	5 episodes
2013	Echoes from the Dead	Julia Davidsson	
2014	Viva Hate	Daniel's momma	3 episodes
2015–2016	Acquitted	Eva Hansteen	Swedish title: Frikjent; 18 episodes
2016	Senses	Helen	Short film
2017	A Hustler's Diary	Lena	Swedish title: Måste gitt
2017	Die kleine Figur	Louise Trolle af Bonde	Short film
2017	Kingsman: The Golden Circle	The Queen of Sweden	
2020	Min pappa Marianne	Eva	
2020	Thin Ice	Elsa Engström	6 episodes
2025	Trolösa		
2025	Sentimental Value	Ingrid Berger	
