= Anna Björk =

Swedish actress

Anna Cecilia Björk (born 12 March 1970 in Trollhättan) is a Swedish actress. Now she works at the Royal Dramatic Theatre.

== Selected filmography ==
- 1989 - Flickan vid stenbänken (TV)
- 1993 - Chefen fru Ingeborg (TV)
- 1996 - Rusar i hans famn
- 1997 - In the Presence of a Clown (TV)
- 1999 - Jakten på en mördare (TV)
- 2003 - Illusive Tracks
- 2004 - Four Shades of Brown
- 2005 - Harrys döttrar
- 2006 - Varannan vecka
- 2006 - Inga tårar
- 2007 - Gynekologen i Askim (TV)
- 2008 - LasseMajas detektivbyrå – Kameleontens hämnd
- 2019 - Quicksand (Netflix Series)
