= Jan Malmsjö =

Swedish singer and actor

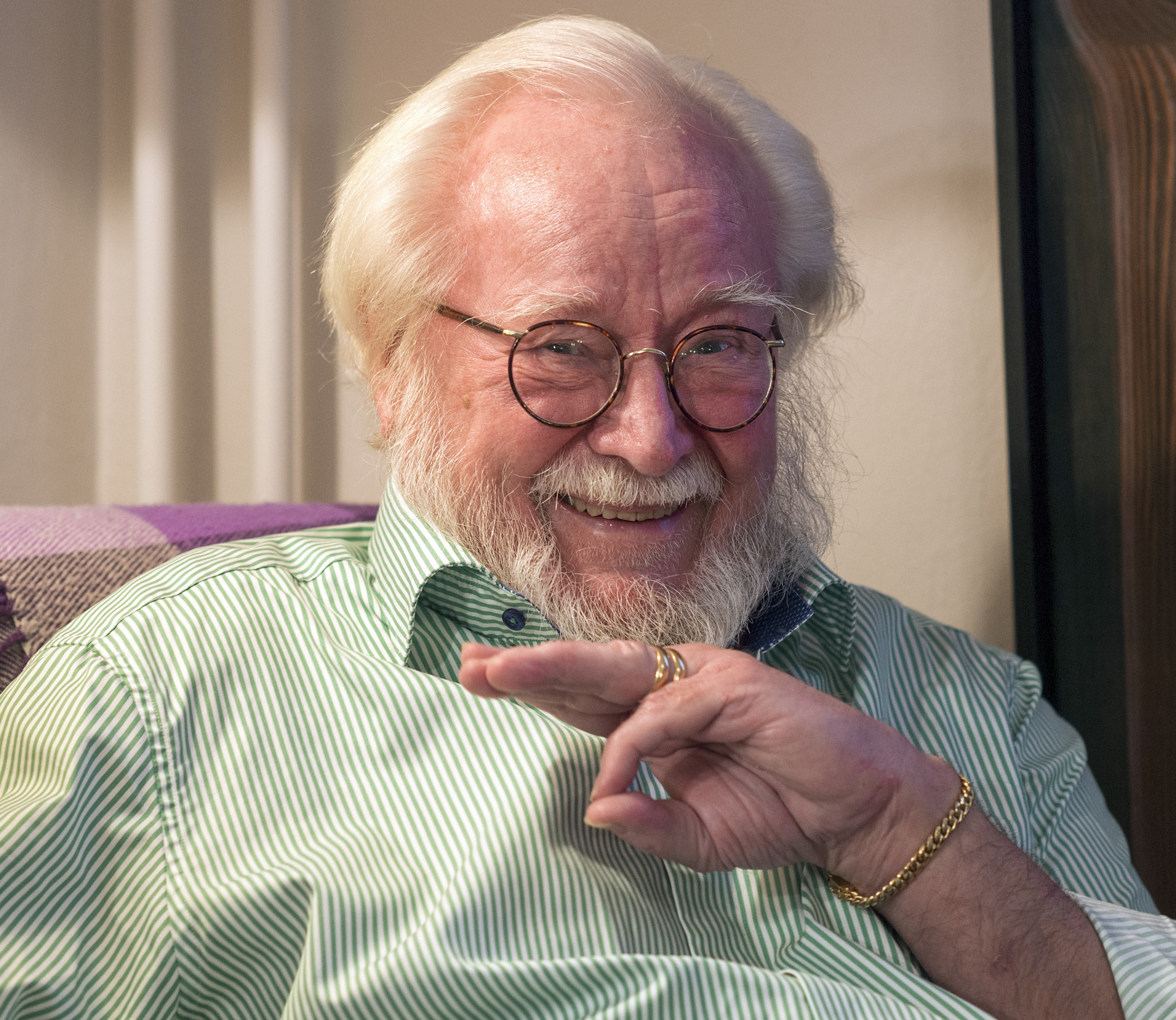
- Jan Malmsjö in 2014
- Born: Jan Wilhelm Malmsjö; 29 May 1932 (age 93); Lund, Sweden
- Occupations: Actor, singer
- Years active: 1950–present
- Spouses: Lena Ericson (m. 1953; div. 1964) Barrie Chase (m. 1966; div. 1968) Marie Göranzon (m. 1974)
- Children: 5 (4 alive), including Jonas Malmsjö

Jan Wilhelm Malmsjö (born 29 May 1932) is a Swedish stage and film actor, musical star and singer. He is married to Marie Göranzon and is the father of Jonas Malmsjö.

== Biography ==
Malmsjö was born in Lund, Sweden. He trained at the Royal Dramatic Training Academy from 1950 to 1953 and one of his first parts on the national stage was as Paris in Shakespeare's Romeo and Juliet (1953).

He appeared in two episodes of the World War II drama Combat! in 1966, first on the fourth season episode "Sudden Terror" as Bruener and secondly on the fifth season episode "The Chapel at Able Five" as Captain Krauss. In the same year he played Ilya W. Vorchek in the episode "Agent of the East" of the World War II espionage series Blue Light.

Malmsjö has a great range as an actor from the title role in Shakespeare's Hamlet (Royal Dramatic Theatre, 1974) and Reverent Manders in Ibsen's Ghosts to Henry Higgins in My Fair Lady and leading roles in other musicals such as La Cage aux Folles and Victor/Victoria. He has also cut several music records in his native Sweden. His Swedish language recording of "Willkommen"; Välkomna till Cabaret (from Malmö City Theatre's successful production of Cabaret 1970; where Malmsjö played the part of Emcee) is well known.

He has filmed sporadically: one of his most famous film parts is as the Bishop Edvard Vergérus in Ingmar Bergman's Fanny and Alexander (1982). One of his more recent stage parts was as The Captain in Strindberg's The Dance of Death in the 1993 Royal Dramatic Theatre production, directed by Lars Norén (adapted for TV in 1996).

He also voiced Lumiere in the Swedish dub of Disney's Beauty and the Beast.

In December 2007, Malmsjö participated in the Swedish reality show Stjärnorna på slottet (Stars at the Castle), at Trolleholm Castle, along with Peter Stormare, Arja Saijonmaa, Britt Ekland and Magnus Härenstam. He participated in Melodifestivalen 2019 with the song "Leva Livet".

Malmsjö was still acting as recently as 2017 at the age of 85, when he was rehearsing the title role of Krapp's Last Tape by Samuel Beckett, at Stockholm's Royal Dramatic Theatre. In early 2019, he was one of the contestants (in a preparatory heat) for Sweden's selection for the Eurovision Song Contest; last time he appeared in the show had been fifty years before.

== Personal life ==
Malmsjö is married to actress and colleague of the Royal Dramatic Theatre, Marie Göranzon. His son, Jonas Malmsjö, is also an actor (and acted opposite his father in Ingmar Bergman's staging of The Ghost Sonata by August Strindberg, in 2000).

== Awards ==
In 1972, Malmsjö was awarded Svenska Dagbladet's Thalia Prize. He was awarded the Litteris et Artibus and Illis quorum in 1986 and the Eugene O'Neill Award in 1988. He received the Guldmasken in 1997, 1999, 2004, and 2009.

== Selected filmography ==
- 1959 – Den inbillade sjuke (a.k.a. The Imaginary Invalid) (TV theatre)
- 1959 – Pojken Winslow (a.k.a. The Winslow Boy) (TV theatre)
- 1960 – The Die Is Cast
- 1960 – Mälarpirater (aka, Pirates on the Malonen)
- 1962 – The Lady in White
- 1963 – Hide and Seek
- 1964 – Älskande par (aka, Loving Couples)
- 1966 – Torn Curtain (in final scene of this Hitchcock movie) – Swedish Photographer (uncredited)
- 1973 – Scenes from a Marriage
- 1975 – Släpp fångarne loss, det är vår!
- 1980 – Marmalade Revolution
- 1982 – Fanny and Alexander
- 1986 – Peter the Great (miniseries)
- 1986 – Kulla-Gulla (mini series)
- 1987 – Jim & Piraterna Blom (a.k.a. Jim and the Pirates)
- 1993 – Drömkåken (a.k.a. The Dream House)
- 1996 – Dödsdansen (TV-theatre, SVT)
- 1997 – Jag är din krigare
- 1998 – Den tatuerade änkan (TV)
- 2006 – Wellkåmm to Verona – Walter
- 2006 – Beck – Den japanska shungamålningen – Ernst Levendahl
- 2007 – Til døden os skiller – Eckelstein
- 2013 – Tyskungen (2013) – Axel Frankel

== Singles ==
| Title | Year | Peak chart positions | Album |
| Title | Year | SWE Heat. | Album |
|---|---|---|---|
| "Leva livet" | 2019 | 9 | Non-album single |

== Photographs ==
- Jan Malmsjö as Hummel in Strindberg's "Ghost Sonata", directed by Ingmar Bergman (2000; left Gunnel Lindblom as The Mummy)
- Jan Malmsjö in the 1970s
- Jan Malmsjö – 2001 portrait
- Jan Malmsjö as Manders in "Ghosts" by Henrik Ibsen (left: Pernilla August as Mrs. Alving)
- Photo from Dramaten.se
