= Lars Amble =

Swedish actor (1939–2015)

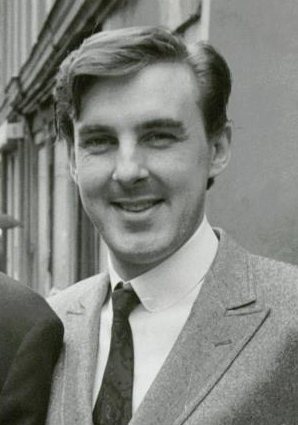
- Amble in 1968
- Born: Lars Anders Amble-Næss; 10 August 1939; Stockholm, Sweden
- Died: 20 August 2015 (aged 76)
- Education: Royal Dramatic Training Academy
- Occupations: actor, director
- Spouse(s): Marie Göranzon (m. 1963–1971) Margareta Kempe (m. 1975–1976) Ingrid Thomasson (m. 1977–1996) Gunborg Alm (m. 1999; died 2015)
- Children: Lolo Amble
- Parents: Leif Amble-Næss (father); Maritta Marke (mother)
- Honours: Litteris et Artibus

Lars Anders Amble-Næss (10 August 1939 – 20 August 2015) was a Swedish actor and director. Amble was the son of Leif Amble-Næss and Maritta Marke. After finishing theater school in Stockholm, which he attended from 1962 to 1965, he was hired by the Royal Dramatic Theater until 1969, after which he has played parts in various theater plays, musicals, TV shows and movies. From 1986 to 1994 he was artistic director for the Maxim theater in Stockholm.

He died of cancer one week and three days after his 76th birthday.

== Selected filmography ==
- Heja Roland! (1966)
- The Corridor (1968)
- The Rescuers (Swedish voice of Orville) (1977)
- Father to Be (1979)
- Harry Potter and the Philosopher's Stone (Swedish voice of Vernon Dursley) (2001)
- Harry Potter and the Chamber of Secrets (Swedish voice of Vernon Dursley) (2002)
- Illusive Tracks (2003)
- Harry Potter and the Prisoner of Azkaban (Swedish voice of Vernon Dursley) (2004)
- Ice Age: The Meltdown (Swedish voice of Anteater Dad) (2006)
- Harry Potter and the Order of the Phoenix (Swedish voice of Vernon Dursley) (2007)
