= Jonas Malmsjö =

Swedish actor (born 1971)

Carl Malmsjö
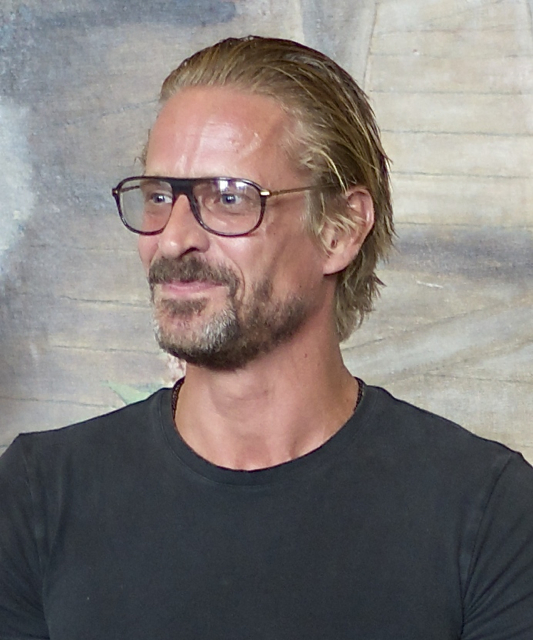
- Carl Jonas Malmsjö in 2014
- Born: 2 September 1971 (age 54); Stockholm, Sweden
- Occupation: Actor

Carl Jonas Love Malmsjö (born 2 September 1971) is a Swedish actor who has worked in theatre, TV and radio; he is the son of Swedish actor Jan Malmsjö and the Swedish actress Marie Göranzon. Apart from his work in his native Sweden, which has included a starring role in the TV series Labyrint, he has been in several productions directed by Ingmar Bergman at the Brooklyn Academy of Music. He was also cast as Skorpa of the White Horse, a Viking warlord in the first season of The Last Kingdom, a BBC adaptation of the first two books in Bernard Cornwell's The Saxon Stories series of historical novels.

He also contributed the voice of Ingmar Bergman in the Sparks musical, The Seduction of Ingmar Bergman.
