= Cleo (TV series) =

- Genre: Comedy
- Written by: Johan Bogaeus; Michael Hjorth
- Directed by: Svante Kettner; Leif Lindblom
- Starring: Suzanne Reuter; Johan Rheborg; Loa Falkman; Gustaf Hammarsten
- Country of origin: Sweden
- Original language: Swedish
- No. of seasons: 3
- No. of episodes: 27

Production
- Running time: 30 minutes

Original release
- Network: SVT
- Release: 24 March 2002

Cleo is a Swedish drama/comedy TV series in two seasons, each consisting of nine episodes. The series was broadcast on SVT, the first season in 2002 and the second in 2003. It was directed by Svante Kettner with the screenplay by Michael Hjorth, Tomas Tivemark and Johan Kindblom.

The name of the series comes from the main character Cleopatra "Cleo" Andersson, played by Suzanne Reuter. When the first episode aired on 24 March 2002 it was watched by 2.2 million people. At the 2004 Monte-Carlo TV Festival, Cleo won three awards in the comedy category, Outstanding Actor, Outstanding Actress and Outstanding European Producer.

== Cast ==
- Suzanne Reuter as Cleopatra Andersson
- Loa Falkman as Claes Lindwall
- Johan Rheborg as Åke Lindén
- Magdalena Johannesson as Kajsa Palm
- Rakel Wärmländer as Jessika Thulin (only 2002)
- Gustaf Hammarsten as Frank Berger
- Karin Huldt as Jill (only 2003)
- Christian Hollbrink as Teddy (only 2003)

== Plot ==
Forty-eight-year-old Cleopatra Andersson works at JTM, a company delivering networking solutions. She has raised her, now 20-year-old, by herself. He decides to move out to a flat of his own, and Cleo's life becomes full of new opportunities. At JTM she gets both help and counterthrust when she willingly and perhaps sometimes unwillingly becomes involved in the dreams and schemes of her colleagues. At the same time, her own personal life is far from carefree.
