= Ulla Skoog =

Swedish actress and comedian

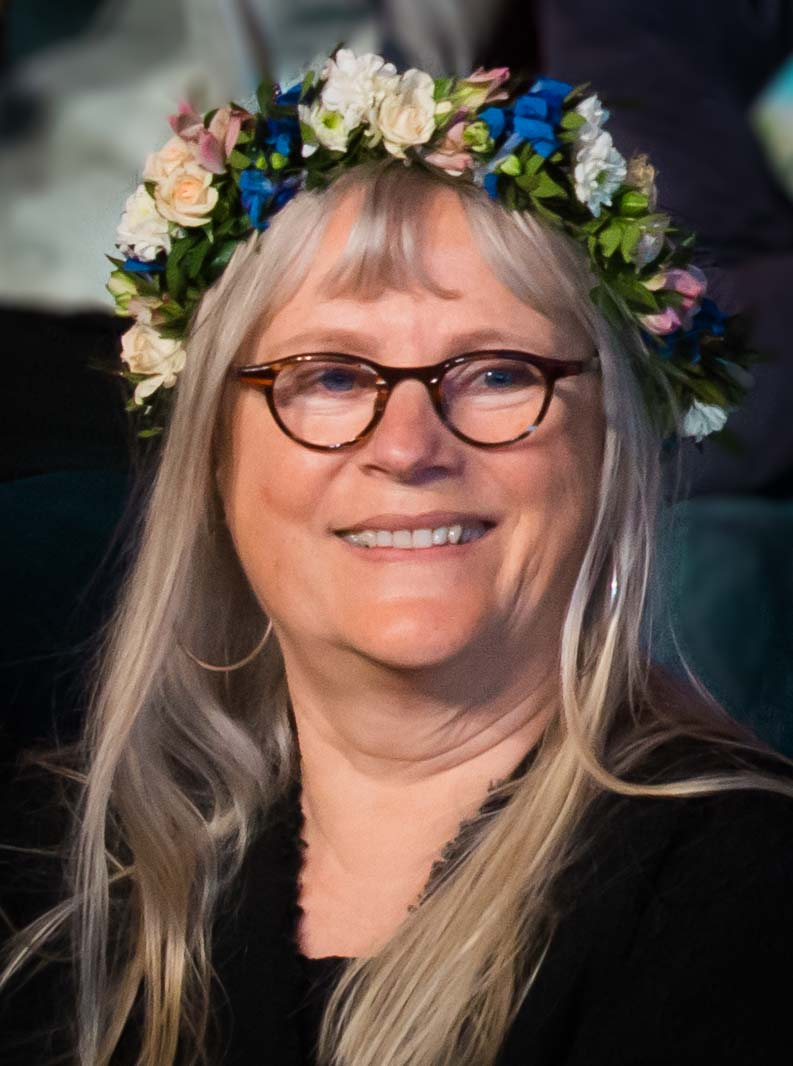
- Ulla Skoog in 2015.
- Born: Ulla Marie Skoog; 23 February 1951 (age 75); Partille, Sweden
- Occupations: Actress, director, comedian
- Years active: 1981–
- Partner: Ronny Carlsson

Ulla Marie Skoog (born 23 February 1951) is a Swedish actress and comedian. She also works as director in TV and at Stockholm City Theatre.

Skoog studied at the Swedish National Academy of Mime and Acting from 1979 until 1981, when she started working at Stockholm City Theatre.

Since the end of the 90s Skoog has performed together with Tomas von Brömssen, among the performances they have performed their revues Rent under and Fritt fall. She has also been appreciated for her own performances Ulla Skoog m mus and Ulla Skoog & Trond Lindheim trallar vidare. She has worked with Trond Lindheim, the composer, arranger and pianist, since 2003.

Skoog received Karamelodiktstipendiet in 1990.

== Selected filmography ==
- 2018 - Storm på Lugna gatan
- 2016 - The voice as Dory in Finding Dory
- 2015 - The voice as Sadness in Inside Out
- 2012 - The Last Sentence
- 2005, 2007 & 2010 - Saltön (TV)
- 2003 - The voice as Dory in Finding Nemo
- 1999 - Reuter & Skoog (TV)
- 1996 - Bill Bergson Lives Dangerously
- 1995 - Pensionat Oskar
- 1995 - En på miljonen
- 1994 - Pillertrillaren
- 1994 - Yrrol
- 1990 - Kurt Olssons julkalender (TV)
- 1990 - Kurt Olsson – filmen om mitt liv som mig själv
- 1989 - Ture Sventon (TV)
- 1989 - Tre kärlekar (TV)
- 1989 - Lorry
- 1988 - S.O.S. – En segelsällskapsresa
- 1986 - Kunglig toilette
