= The Last Sentence =

The Last Sentence (Dom över död man)
- English language cinema poster
- Directed by: Jan Troell
- Written by: Jan Troell; Klaus Rifbjerg
- Produced by: Francy Suntinger
- Starring: Jesper Christensen; Pernilla August; Ulla Skoog; Björn Granath
- Cinematography: Mischa Gavrjusjov; Jan Troell
- Production company: Filmlance International
- Release date: 7 December 2012
- Running time: 121 minutes
- Country: Sweden
- Language: Swedish
- Budget: 43 million kr
- Box office: $327,297

The Last Sentence (Swedish: Dom över död man; Judgement on the dead) is a 2012 Swedish film, directed by Jan Troell and starring Jesper Christensen, Pernilla August, Björn Granath and Ulla Skoog. It is set between 1933 and 1945, and focuses on the life and career of Torgny Segerstedt, a Swedish newspaper editor who was a prominent critic of Hitler and the Nazis during a period when the Swedish government and monarch were intent on maintaining Sweden's neutrality and avoiding tensions with Germany. The film also deals with Segerstedt's relations with his wife, his mistress, and his mistress's husband (who was a close friend of Segerstedt).

The film's Swedish title, Dom över död man, comes from a line in the Old Norse poem Hávamál: "Cattle die, kinsmen die, thou wilt also die; but I know one thing that never dies: the judgment on the dead".

== Cast ==
- Jesper Christensen as Torgny Segerstedt
- Pernilla August as Maja Forssman
- Björn Granath as Axel Forssman
- Ulla Skoog as Puste Segerstedt
- Peter Andersson as Foreign Minister Christian Günther
- Amanda Ooms
- Maria Heiskanen as Pirjo
- Lennart Hjulström as Marcus Wallenberg
- Johanna Troell as Ingrid Segerstedt
- Birte Heribertsson as Estrid Ancker
- Lia Boysen as Anita
- Josef Persson as young revolutionary
- Kenneth Milldoff as Prime Minister Per Albin Hansson
- Jan Tiselius as Gustaf V

== Production ==
=== Development ===
After finishing his previous feature film, Everlasting Moments from 2008, director Jan Troell has said that he felt an emptiness and wondered whether he ever would get to make another film. Around that time he received a phonecall from the writer Kenne Fant, who in 2007 had published a biography about Torgny Segerstedt, an early outspoken critic of Adolf Hitler who before and during World War II had been the editor-in-chief of the newspaper Göteborgs Handels- och Sjöfartstidning. Fant wondered whether Troell would be interested in making a film based on Segerstedt's life. Troell accepted the offer when his friend Klaus Rifbjerg, a Danish writer, was enthusiastic about the project and wanted to be Troell's co-writer. Initially, Troell had problems finding an approach for the film's narrative, but soon read another biography about Segerstedt, written by his secretary Estrid Ancker. Troell also read Ancker's research material for the book, which included interviews with more than 300 people connected to Segerstedt. Through this material Troell found out more about Segerstedt on a personal level, including his personal motivations and private relationships. The director then chose to make a film which focuses on Segerstedt as a human being more than as a public figure. According to Troell it took "a couple of years" to form the narrative and write the screenplay with Rifbjerg.

Production was led by Filmlance International. Co-producers included Film i Väst, Filmpool Nord, Sveriges Television, Nordisk Film and companies in Norway. The project received eleven million kronor in support from the Swedish Film Institute and 450,000 euros from Eurimages, as well as funding from the Norwegian Film Institute and Nordisk Film- & TV Fond. The production involved a total budget of 43 million kronor.

Early in the production process Max von Sydow was considered for the role of Segerstedt. Soon however Troell decided to offer it to the Danish actor Jesper Christensen. Both Troell and Christensen were initially worried about Christensen's Danish accent, which would be inconsistent with the role; this was eventually solved by changing the script to make Segerstedt's mother Danish. The casting choice was also motivated with the fact that Troell's earlier film Hamsun had starred Sydow, who there spoke Swedish in the role of the Norwegian author Knut Hamsun.

=== Filming ===
Principal photography commenced 21 February 2011 in Luleå where it continued for three weeks. Filmpool Nord's Studio Kronan was used for studio scenes set in Göteborgs Handels- och Sjöfartstidning's office and Segerstedt's home. Also in Luleå, footage was taken of the Lule River, which stands in for Klarälven in the film. After that the team relocated to Gothenburg for eight weeks of filming, which consisted of exterior scenes and on-location interiors. Finally they went to Stockholm for three days in May. The filming in Stockholm included a scene set inside the Storkyrkan Cathedral, which was staged as a homage to the 1947 short film Symphony of a City by Arne Sucksdorff, a filmmaker who was a major influence for Troell's earliest works. The Last Sentence was recorded with Arri Alexa cameras. It was the first feature-length fiction film Troell shot digitally, although he had previously directed digital short films and a documentary feature.
