= A Hustler's Diary =

- Directed by: Ivica Zubak
- Starring: Lena Endre; Madeleine Martin
- Release date: 6 January 2017
- Running time: 1h 37min
- Country: Sweden
- Language: Swedish
- Box office: $ 15 429

A Hustler's Diary (Swedish: Måste gitt) is a 2017 Swedish comedy film directed by Ivica Zubak.

Best Screenplay award nomination at the 53rd Guldbagge Awards. Audience Award at the 2017 Warsaw Film Festival.

== Cast ==
- Lena Endre - Lena
- Madeleine Martin - Nathalie Vallsten
- Shebly Niavarani - Omar Najafi
- Jörgen Thorsson - Puma Andersson
