= Stefan Sauk =

Swedish actor (born 1955)

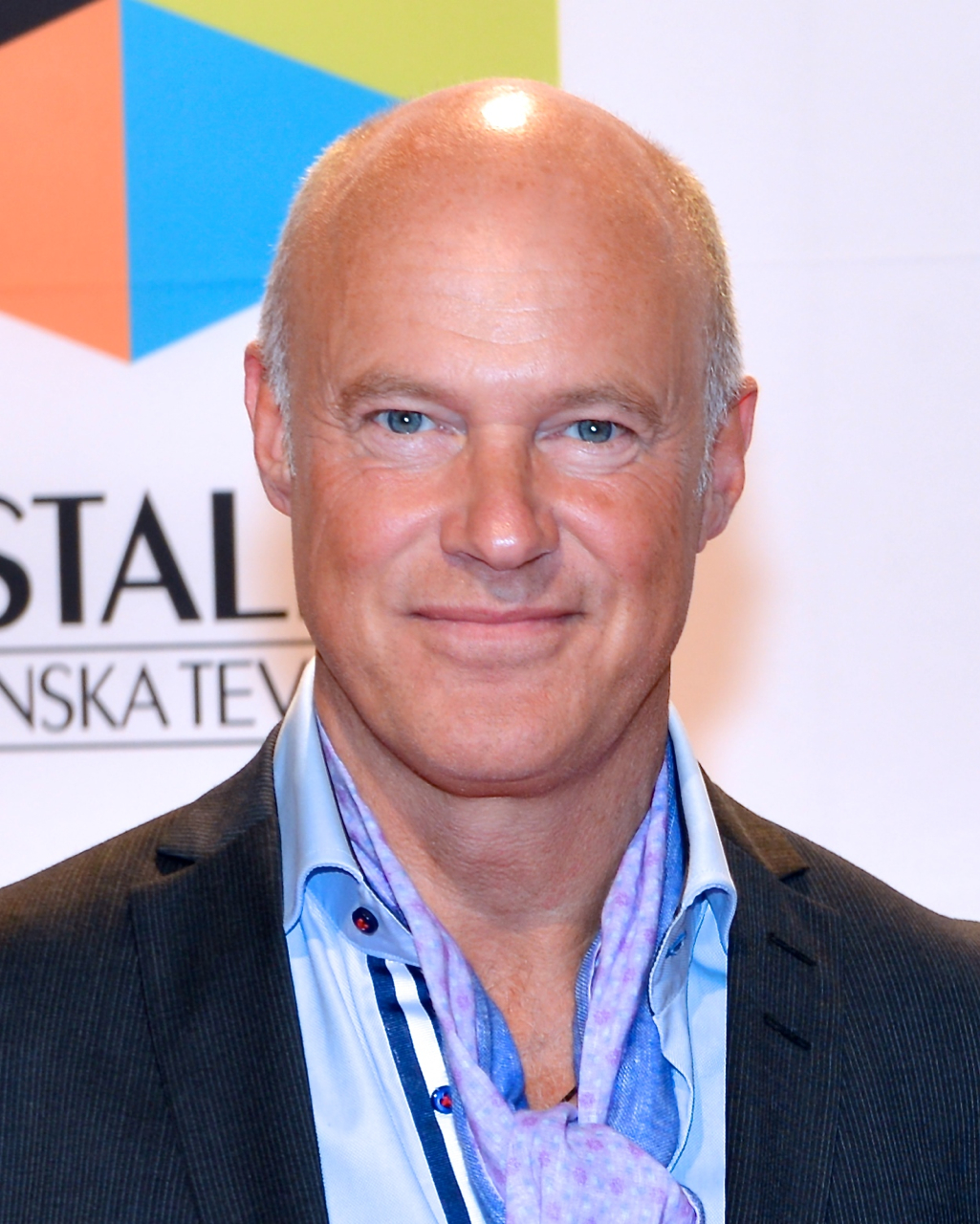
- Sauk in 2013
- Born: Stefan Wernström; 6 June 1955 (age 69); Stockholm, Sweden
- Occupation: Actor
- Years active: 1984–present

Stefan Sauk (born Stefan Wernström, 6 June 1955) is a Swedish actor and comedian who has worked in film, television, and theatre since 1984.

== Selected filmography ==
=== Film ===
List of film appearances, with year, title, and role shown
Year	Title	Role	Notes
1987	Hip Hip Hurrah!	Hugo Alfvén	
1988	Strul	Alf Brinke	
1988	Friends	Rock	
1995	Vendetta	Carl Hamilton	
1995	30:e november	police officer	
1997	The Island on Bird Street	Goehler	
2003	At Point Blank	Greger Krona	
2009	The Girl with the Dragon Tattoo	Hans-Erik Wennerström	
2010	Dear Alice	Håkan Pettersson	
2011	The Stig-Helmer Story	Biffen's father	
2018	One Last Deal	Albert Johnson	

=== Television ===
List of television appearances, with year, title, and role shown
1984–88	Träpatronerna	Leonard Ulander	6 episodes
1989–95	Lorry	various roles	28 episodes
1990	Den svarta cirkeln	Johan Nordenskiöld	5 episodes
2000	Labyrinten	Love	5 episodes
2000	Brottsvåg	Thommy Berg	6 episodes
2000	Herr von Hancken	Lesage	4 episodes
2009	Morden	Mårten	6 episodes
2010	Millennium	Hans-Erik Wennerström	2 episodes
2012	Don't Ever Wipe Tears Without Gloves	Rasmus' father	3 episodes
2019	Innan vi dör	Jan	6 episodes
