= Marie Göranzon =

Swedish actress (born 1942)

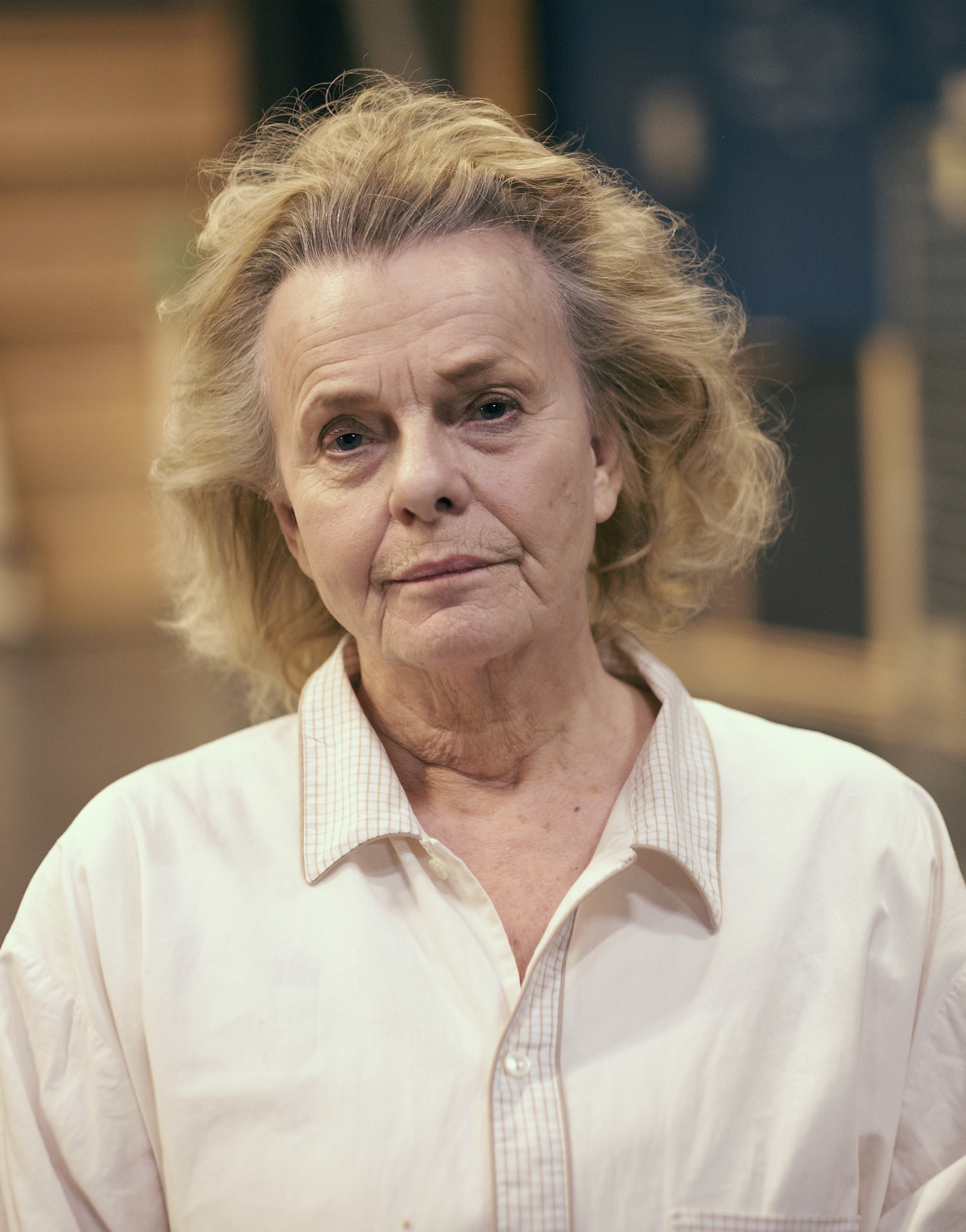
- Marie Göranzon (2016)
- Born: Britt-Marie Elisabeth Göranzon; 27 October 1942 (age 83); Linköping, Sweden
- Occupation: Actress
- Years active: 1962–present
- Spouse(s): Lars Amble (m. 1963–1971) Jan Malmsjö (m. 1974)
- Children: Lolo Amble; Jonas Malmsjö

Britt-Marie Elisabeth Göranzon Malmsjö (born 27 October 1942) is a Swedish actress.

Marie Göranzon has been part of Sweden's Royal Dramatic Theatre-ensemble since 1967. She trained at the Royal Dramatic Training Academy from 1964 to 1967.

== Personal life ==
Göranzon's first husband was Lars Amble, an actor and director. Göranzon's husband is Jan Malmsjö, an actor. Göranzon's son is Jonas Malmsjö, also an actor of the Royal Dramatic Theatre).

=== Distinctions ===
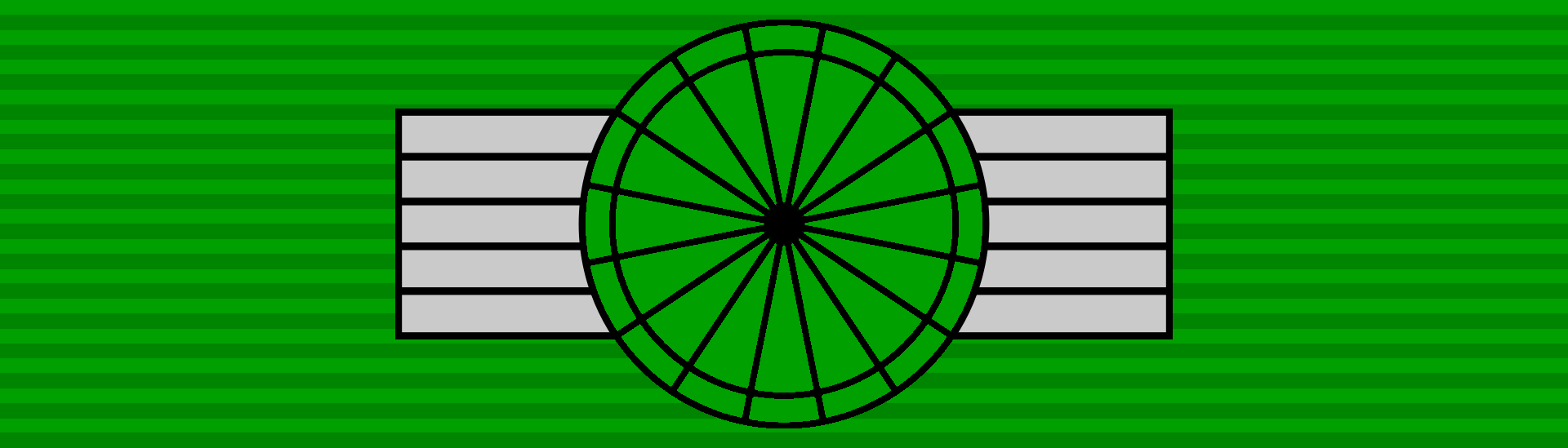
- Sweden: Royal Order of Vasa, Commander (30 April 2025)

== Filmography ==
- 1985 False as Water - Anna
- 2004 Day and Night - Modern.
- Maragethe Chief of Police in Beck 2015-16
