= Peter Dalle =

Swedish actor, comedian and director

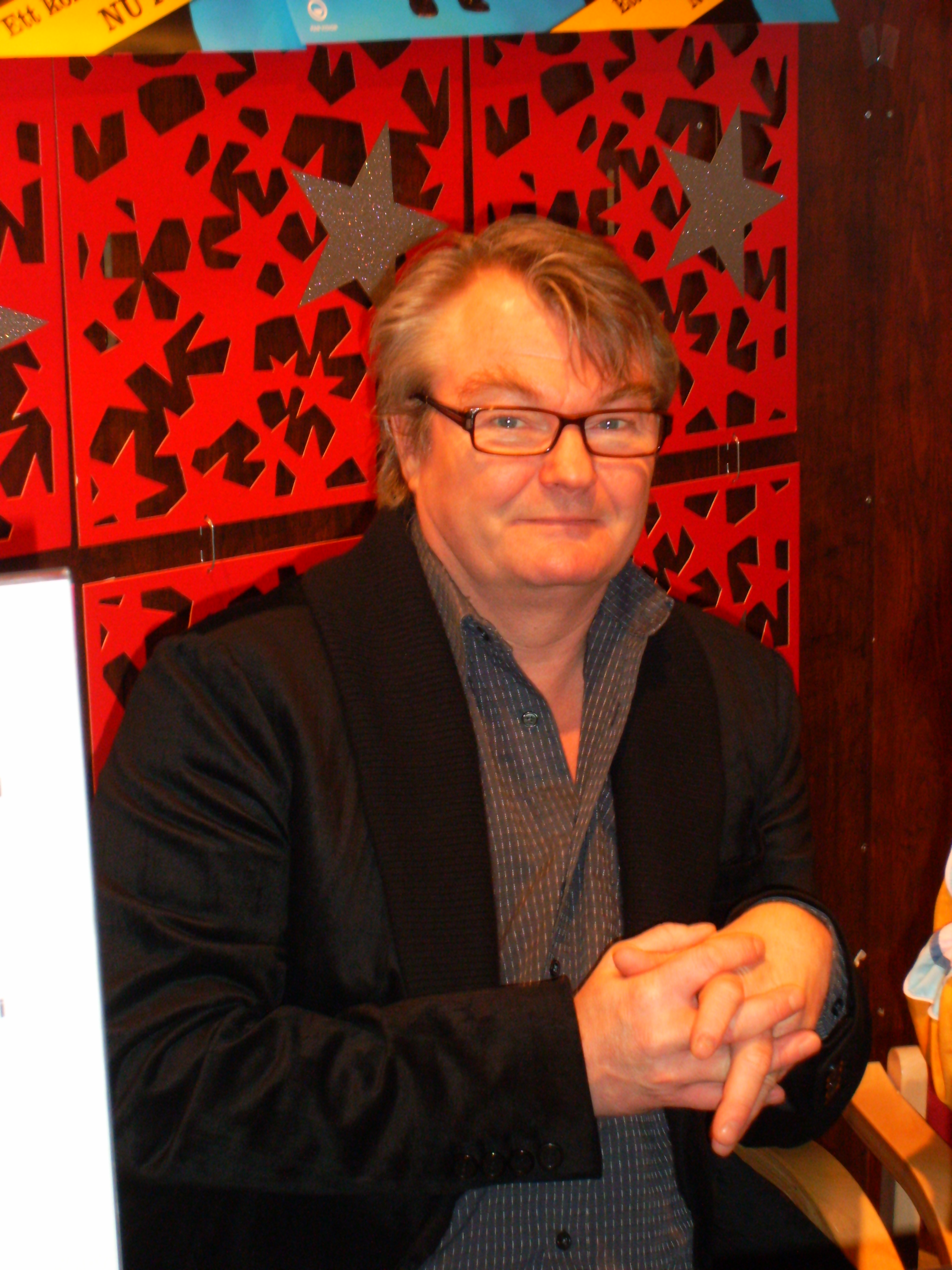
- Peter Dalle in 2008
- Born: Dan Peter Dalle; 5 December 1956 (age 69); Stockholm, Sweden
- Occupations: Actor, comedian, writer, film director
- Years active: 1985–present
- Spouse: Gunnel Fred (divorced)
- Children: 1

Dan Peter Dalle (born 5 December 1956) is a Swedish actor, comedian, writer and film director. Dalle grew up in Täby outside Stockholm. He is most famous for the TV series Lorry. He wrote and directed the 1939-set thriller En fiende att dö för (An Enemy To Die For), which had its world premiere in March 2012 in Stockholm.

== Biography ==
Peter Dalle grew up in Täby, Stockholm County. Together with Ulf Larsson, he founded the Cocosteatern there in 1976.

Dalle graduated from the Swedish National Academy of Mime and Acting in Stockholm in 1984 and became known to the general public through his role as Pierre Waldén in the TV series Good Neighbors (1987). Dalle became really established through the TV series Lorry, first broadcast in 1989. He has directed several feature films, including Drömkåken, Ogifta par – en film som skiljer sig and Illusive Tracks.

Peter Dalle collaborated with Hans Alfredson in the revue Prins korv under taket (1999). He has directed several productions of Dramaten, including Markurells i Wadköping by Hjalmar Bergman. Dalle has always alternated directing assignments with acting. Among his theater roles are the police officer in the farce Lögn i helvete with Robert Gustafsson at Vasateatern, and Lorrygänget's revue at Oscarsteatern in Stockholm. In the summer of 2010, Dalle was part of the production of Zpanska flugan in Kalmar. In the autumn of 2013, together with Johan Ulveson, he played over 130 roles in the thriller comedy The 39 Steps at Intiman in Stockholm.

== Filmography ==
- Charlie Strapp and Froggy Ball Flying High (voice) (1991)
- Drömkåken (1993)
- Behind Blue Skies (2010)
- Ravens (2017)
- The Snowman (2017)

== Sources ==
- "Peter Dalle" (in Swedish). Swedish Film Institute.
