= Gunilla Röör =

Swedish actress (born 1959)

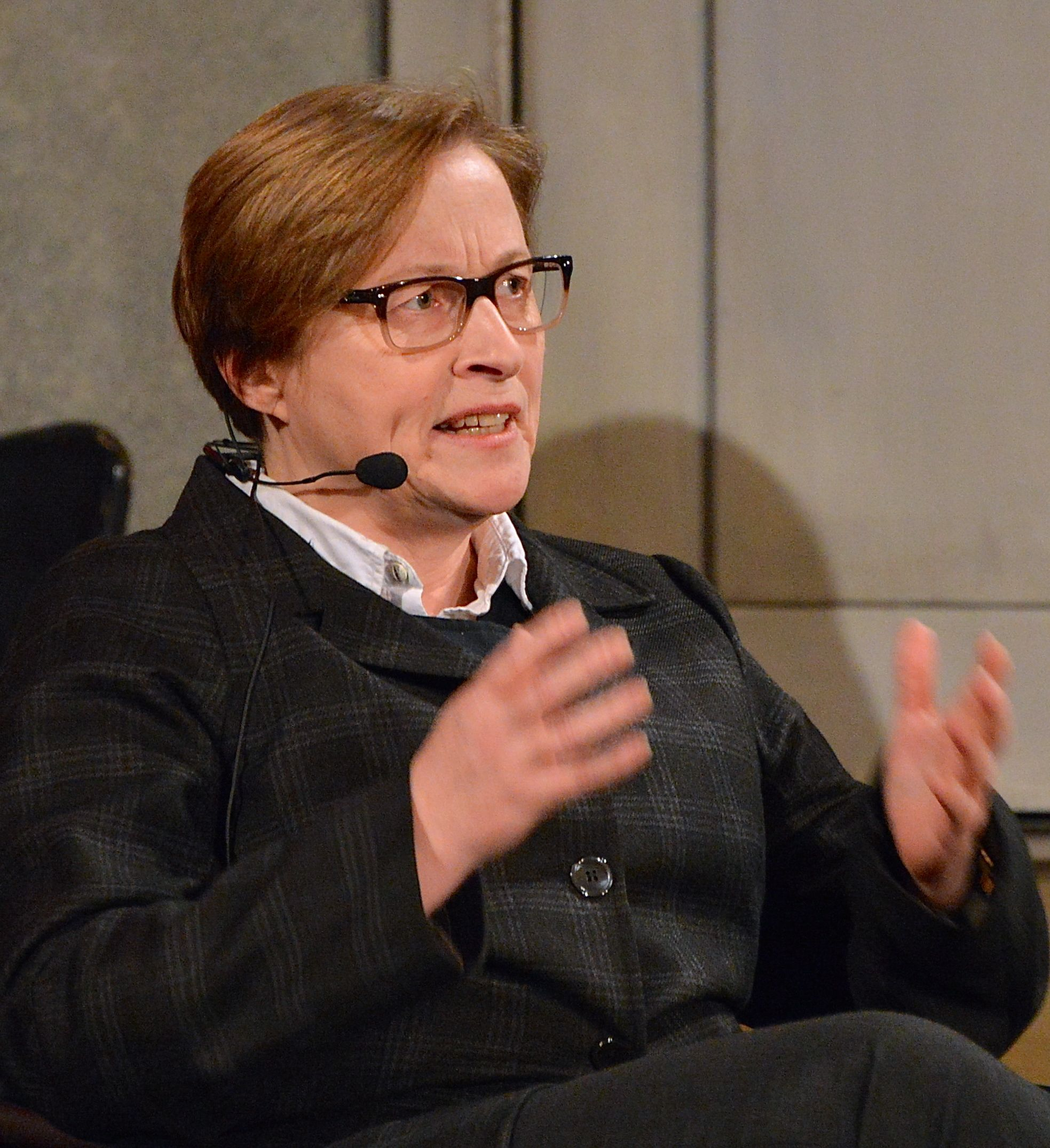
- Gunilla Röör in 2013.
- Born: Gunilla Kristina Röör; 16 August 1959 (age 66); Stockholm, Sweden
- Occupation: Actress
- Years active: 1986-present
- Spouse: Per Sandberg
- Children: 1
- Parent: Inger Berggren

Gunilla Kristina Röör (born 16 August 1959) is a Swedish actress. She is a daughter of Inger Berggren. As of 2011, she worked at Stockholm City Theatre. She is married to Per Sandberg; the couple has one child together.

She was born 16 August 1959.

Röör finished her education at the Swedish National Academy of Mime and Acting in 1986, where Lena Endre was also a student.

At the 27th Guldbagge Awards she won the award for Best Actress for her role in Freud Leaving Home.

== Selected filmography ==
- Lethal Film (1988)
- The Guardian Angel (1990)
- Freud Leaving Home (1991)
- Night of the Orangutan (1992)
- Yrrol (1994)
- Sommaren (1995)
- Adam & Eva (1997)
- Skärgårdsdoktorn (TV) (1997)
- Under the Sun (1998)
- En liten julsaga (1999)
- Gossip (2000)
- Sprängaren (2001)
- Beck – Sista vittnet (2002)
- Gud, lukt och henne (2008)
- Livet i Fagervik (TV) (2008)
- Bibliotekstjuven (TV) (2011)
