= Gunilla Pontén =

Swedish fashion designer (1929–2019)

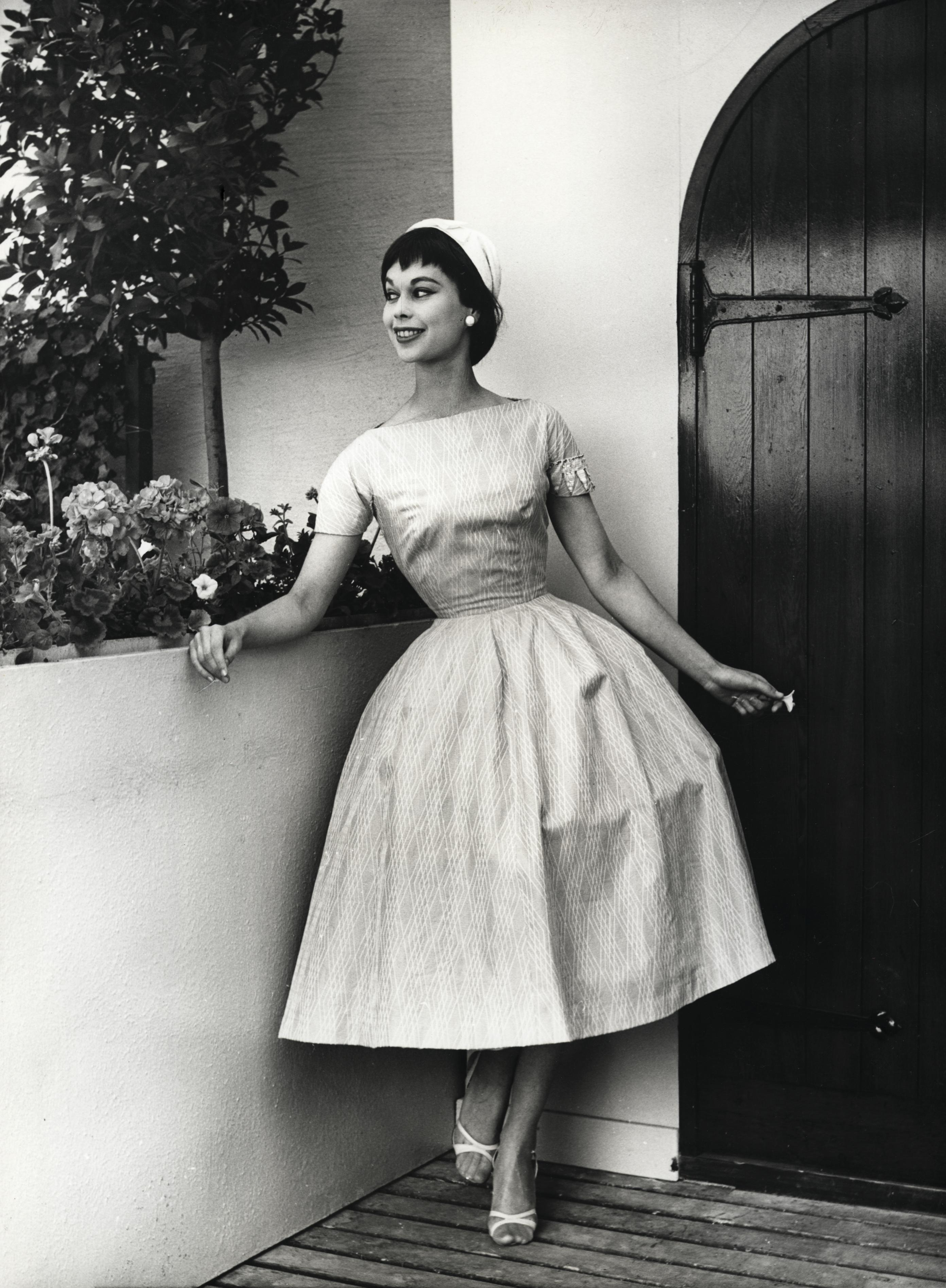
- Gunilla Pontén in June 1955
- Born: 14 June 1929; Stockholm, Sweden
- Died: 29 June 2019 (aged 90); Stockholm, Sweden
- Occupations: fashion designer, model

Ellen Gunilla Margareta Pontén (14 June 1929 in Stockholm – 29 June 2019) was a Swedish fashion designer.

Pontén designed clothes with the base colours of grey, white or black. In 1983, she was awarded the Damernas Värld design award Guldknappen (lit. "The gold button") and in 2003 the Litteris et Artibus royal medal. She also worked alongside Emilio Pucci in Italy. In 2008, she was awarded the KTH Great Prize.
