= Stina Ekblad =

Finnish-Swedish actress (born 1954)

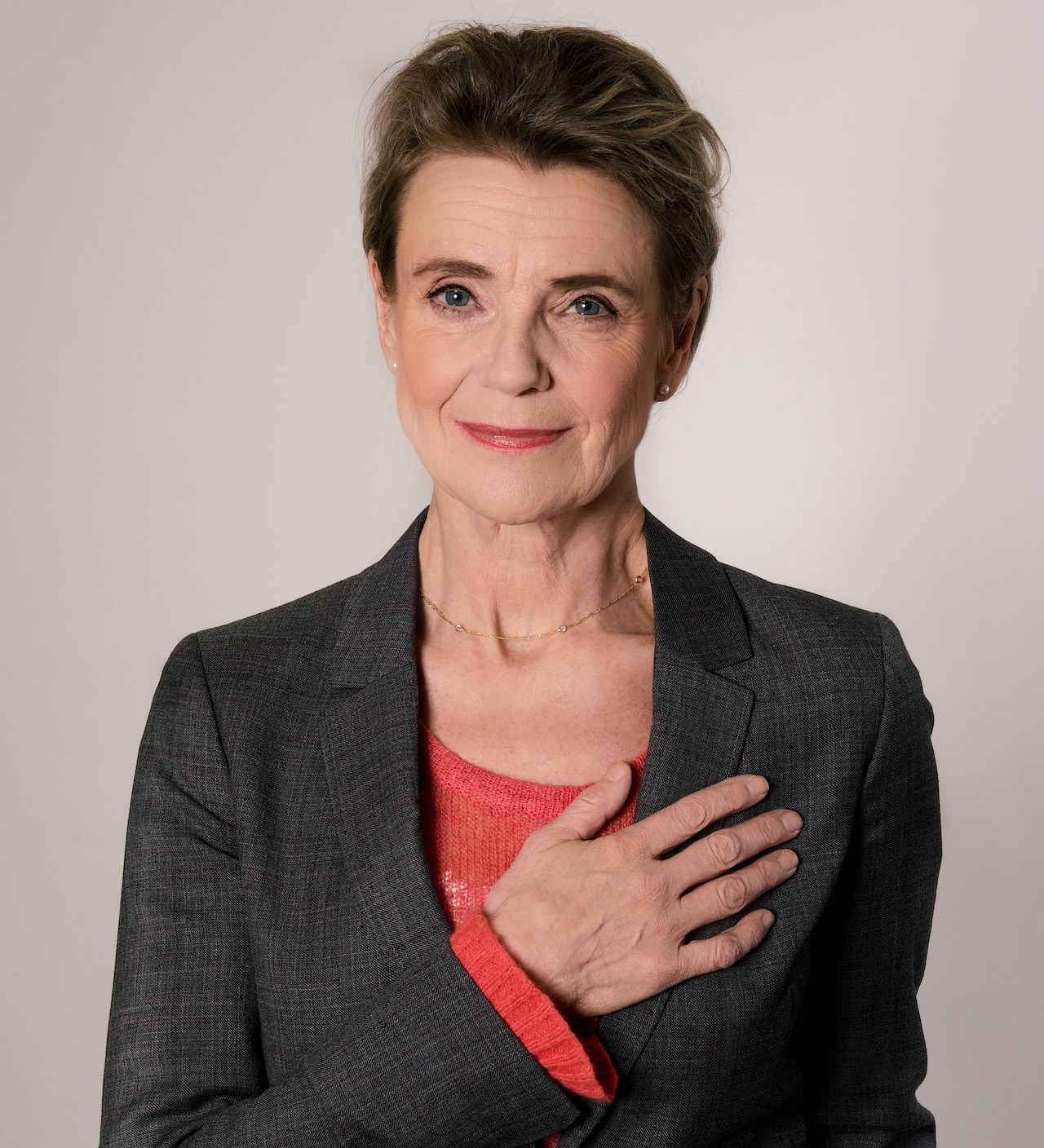
- Ekblad in 2014
- Born: Stina Åsa Maria Ekblad; 26 February 1954 (age 72); Solf, Ostrobothnia, Finland
- Occupation: Actress
- Years active: 1975–present
- Partner: Jan Dolata
- Children: 1

Stina Åsa Maria Ekblad (born 26 February 1954) is a Swedish-speaking Finnish actress. Living in Stockholm, she has appeared mostly in Swedish productions. She received a Guldbagge Award for Best Actress in 1987 for her performances in Amorosa and Ormens väg på hälleberget (The Serpent's Way) and was nominated again in 1996 for her performance in Pensionat Oskar.

Stina Åsa Maria Ekblad was born on 26 February 1954 in Solf in Ostrobothnia. Her parents are Karl Erik Ekblad and Gertrud Viola Boholm. She was educated at the acting school of the Odense Theatre and has worked as an actress in Odense. In 1977, she published a book of poems titled Dikter.

In 2006, she received the Thalia Prize from Svenska Dagbladet for her leading role in Phèdre.

She and her partner Jan Dolata have a son.

== Selected filmography ==
=== Film ===
Year	Title	Role	Notes	Ref.
1982	Fanny and Alexander			
1986	Amorosa			
1986	The Serpent's Way			
1988	Lethal Film			
1990	Friends, Comrades			
1991	Agnes Cecilia – en sällsam historia	Karin Sjöborg		
1994	Carl, My Childhood Symphony			
1995	Like It Never Was Before	Gunnel Runeberg		
2000	Faithless			
2001	As White as in Snow			
2003	At Point Blank			
2013	Crimes of Passion			
2023	A Day and a Half			

=== Television ===
Year	Title	Role	Notes	Ref.
2004–2006	Krøniken			
2005–2013	Wallander			

=== Theater ===
Year	Title	Role	Venue	Notes	Ref.
1993	Measure for Measure	Isabella	Royal Dramatic Theater	Main stage	
1994	Systrar, bröder	Inga	Royal Dramatic Theater	Little stage	
2003	Mother Courage and Her Children	Kattrin	Royal Dramatic Theater	Målarsalen stage	
2006	Phèdre	Phaedra	Royal Dramatic Theater		
2023	The Persians/The Trojan Women	Hekabe	Royal Dramatic Theater	Main stage	
