= Like It Never Was Before =

- Directed by: Susanne Bier
- Written by: Jonas Gardell
- Starring: Loa Falkman; Stina Ekblad
- Cinematography: Kjell Lagerroos
- Distributed by: Svensk Filmindustri
- Release date: 3 March 1995
- Running time: 1h 48min
- Countries: Denmark; Sweden
- Language: Swedish

Like It Never Was Before (Swedish: Pensionat Oskar, lit. 'Boarding House Oskar') is a 1995 Danish / Swedish drama film directed by Susanne Bier, and written by Jonas Gardell.

The film was adapted into a play directed by Jakob Höglund, which premiered on 25 April 2025 at The House of Culture's City Theater.

== Cast ==
- Loa Falkman - Rune Runeberg
- Stina Ekblad - Gunnel Runeberg
- Simon Norrthon - Petrus
- Philip Zandén - superintendent
- Sif Ruud - Evelyn
- Ghita Nørby - Hjördis
- Ingvar Hirdwall - strange man
- Ulla Skoog - beach tennis woman
- Per Sandberg - beach tennis man
- Anna-Lena Hemström - Mona
- Claire Wikholm - Britt Dagerman
- Per Eggers - Bertil Dagerman
- Jakob Eklund - Harry
- Bengt Blomgren - Runeberg's boss
