= Claes Månsson =

Swedish actor

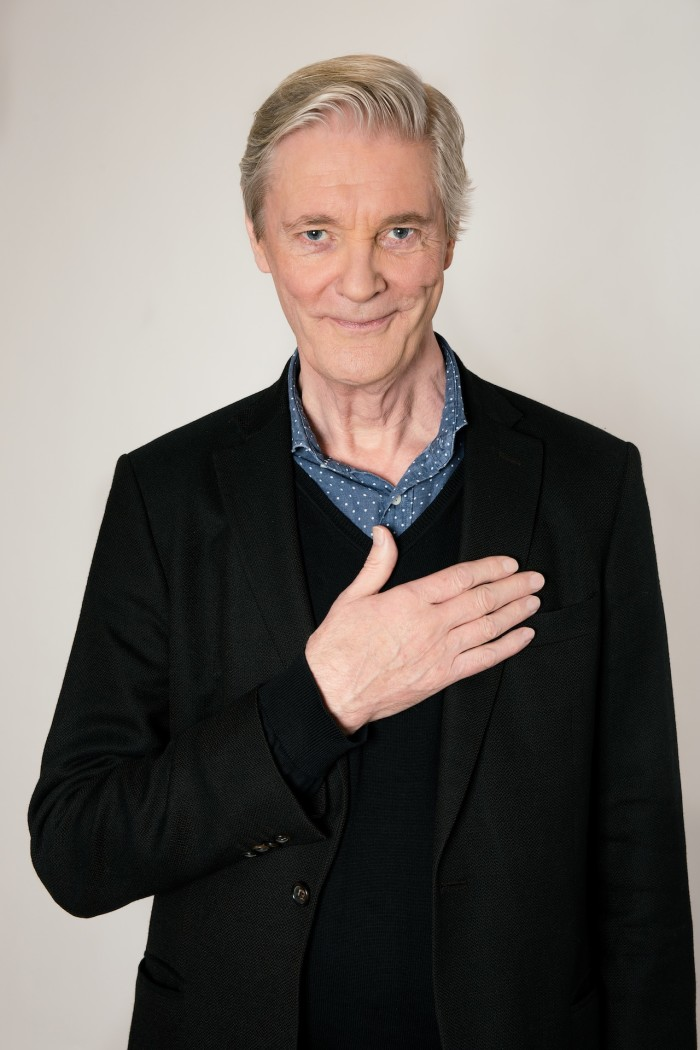
- Claes Månsson in 2014.
- Born: Claes Göran Månsson; 5 February 1950 (age 76); Gothenburg, Sweden
- Occupations: Actor, comedian, writer, film director
- Children: 2

Claes Göran Månsson (born 5 February 1950) is a Swedish actor, comedian, writer and film director, most famous for his work on Swedish TV series Lorry. Månsson also co-starred on the Swedish sitcom Welcome to Sweden and is known for dubbing the voice of Wallace in the Swedish-language versions of the British stop-motion Wallace & Gromit films (except for Wallace and Gromit: The Curse Of The Were-Rabbit and Wallace and Gromit: Vengeance Most Fowl).

== Filmography ==
- 1989 – A Grand Day Out (voice; Swedish dub)
- 1989 – 1939 (1989)
- 1991 – Charlie Strapp and Froggy Ball Flying High (voice)
- 1993 – The Wrong Trousers (voice; Swedish dub)
- 1995 – A Close Shave (voice; Swedish dub)
- 1996 – Lilla Jönssonligan och cornflakeskuppen
- 1997 – Peter-No-Tail
- 2002 – Olivia Twist
- 2006 – Barnyard (voice; Swedish dub)
- 2008 – A Matter Of Loaf And Death (voice; Swedish dub)
- 2011 – The Stig-Helmer Story
- 2014 – Welcome to Sweden
- 2019 – Blinded
- 2026 – Je m'appelle Agneta
