= Johan Ulveson =

Swedish actor and comedian

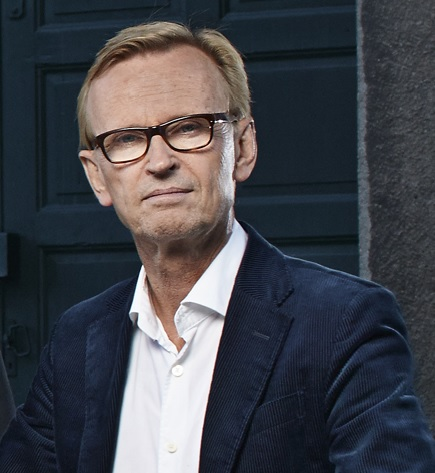
- Born: Karl Johan Magnus Ulveson; 30 May 1954 (age 71); Stockholm, Sweden
- Occupation: Actor
- Years active: 1986–present

Karl Johan Magnus Ulveson (born 30 May 1954) is a Swedish actor and comedian. Most famous for appearing in Lorry, c/o Segemyhr and Parlamentet.

Ulveson grew up in Stockholm, graduated in Malmö and started his career at Norrbottensteatern in Luleå before his national breakthrough working with Povel Ramel in Affär Ramel. He voiced Calcifer in the Swedish dub of Howl's Moving Castle.
