= Gunnel Fred =

Swedish actress

- Born: Gunnel Elisabet Fred; 29 August 1955 (age 70); Stockholm, Sweden
- Occupation: Actress
- Years active: 1976–present
- Spouse(s): Stefan Ekman (m. 1977–1981) Peter Dalle (divorced)
- Children: 2

Gunnel Elisabet Fred (born 29 August 1955) is a Swedish film actress. In 2019, Fred had a role in the American horror film Midsommar. In 2021, she had a role in Sveriges Television's Christmas calendar ”En hederlig jul med Knyckertz”.

== Selected filmography ==
- Midsommar (2019)
- Saraband (2003)
- Details (2003)
- In the Presence of a Clown (1997)
- Private Confessions (1996)
- Underground Secrets (1991)
- The Land Before Time (1988)
- Åke and His World (1984)
