= 50th Guldbagge Awards =

Swedish film awards

- Date: 26 January 2015
- Site: Cirkus, Stockholm
- Hosted by: Petra Mede

Highlights
- Best Picture: Force Majeure
- Most awards: Force Majeure (6)
- Most nominations: Gentlemen (13)

Television coverage
- Network: SVT
- Duration: 2 hours

The 50th Guldbagge Awards ceremony, presented by the Swedish Film Institute, honoring the best Swedish films of 2014, took place on 26 January 2015. The ceremony was televised by SVT and hosted, for the third time by comedian Petra Mede.

== Winners and nominees ==
The nominees for the 50th Guldbagge Awards were announced on 8 January 2015 in Stockholm, by the Swedish Film Institute.

=== Awards ===
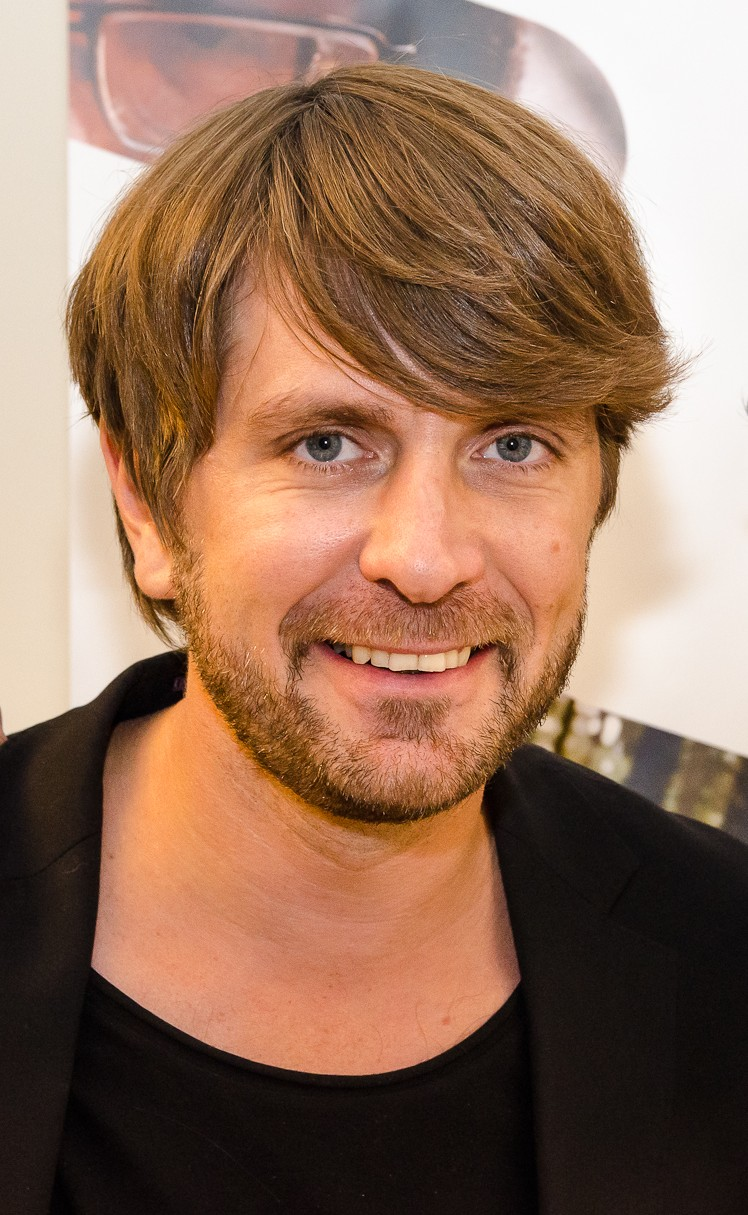
Ruben Östlund, Best Director and Screenwriter winner

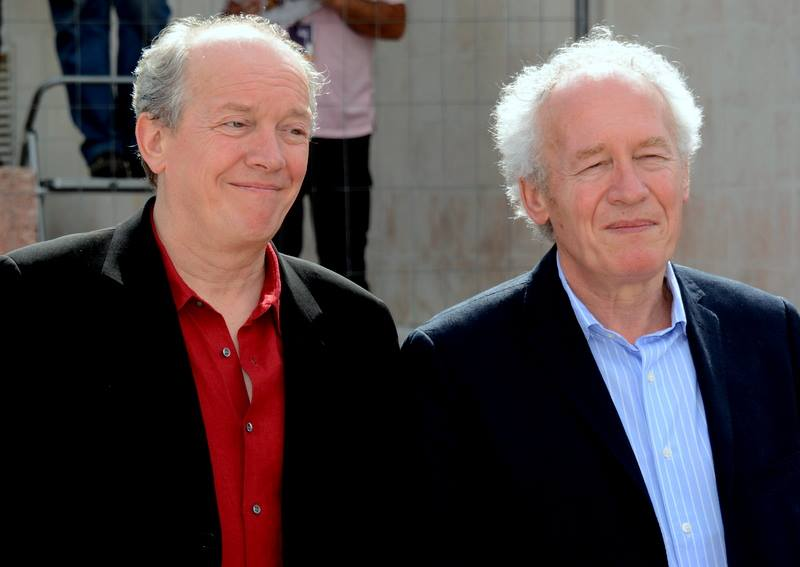
Jean-Pierre and Luc Dardenne, Best Foreign Film winner

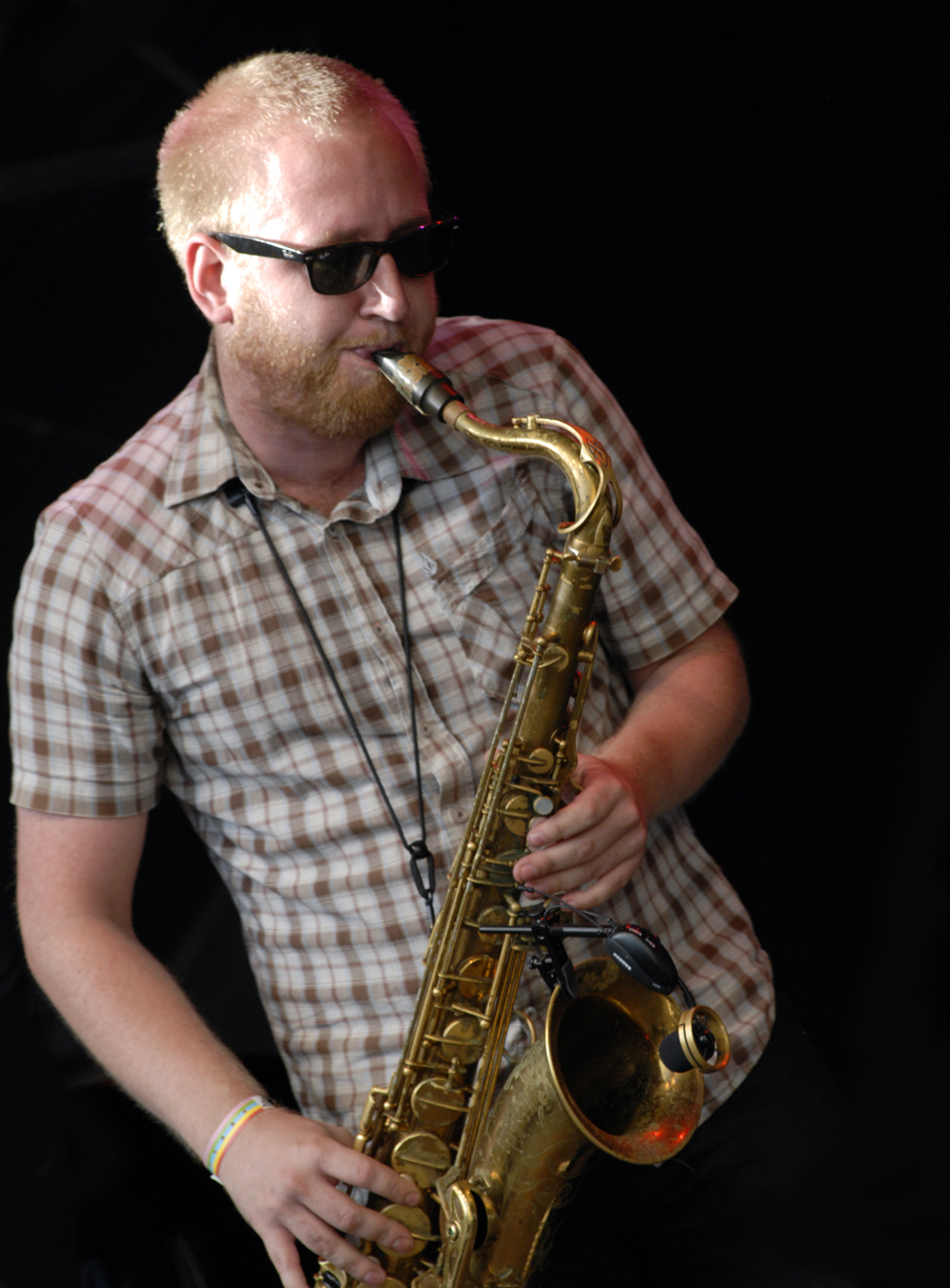
Jonas Kullhammar, Best Original Score winner

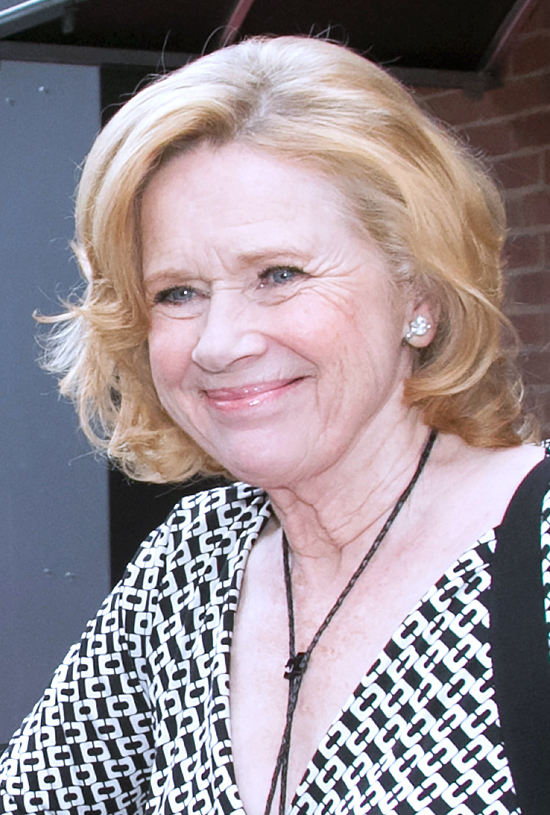
Liv Ullmann, Honorary Award winner

Winners are listed first and highlighted in boldface.

**Best Film**: **Force Majeure**; A Pigeon Sat on a Branch Reflecting on Existence; Gentlemen	**Best Director**: **Ruben Östlund – Force Majeure**; Mikael Marcimain – Gentlemen; Roy Andersson – A Pigeon Sat on a Branch Reflecting on Existence
**Best Actress in a leading role**: **Saga Becker – Something Must Break**; Lisa Loven Kongsli – Force Majeure; Vera Vitali – My So-Called Father	**Best Actor in a leading role**: **Sverrir Gudnason – Flugparken**; David Dencik – Gentlemen; Johannes Bah Kuhnke – Force Majeure
**Best Supporting Actress**: **Anita Wall – Home**; Fanni Metelius – Force Majeure; Ruth Vega Fernandez – Gentlemen	**Best Supporting Actor**: **Kristofer Hivju – Force Majeure**; Peter Andersson – Flugparken; Sverrir Gudnason – Gentlemen
**Best Screenplay**: **Ruben Östlund – Force Majeure**; Ester Martin Bergsmark and Eli Levén – Something Must Break; Klas Östergren – Gentlemen	**Best Cinematography**: **Fredrik Wenzel – Force Majeure**; Fredrik Wenzel – The Quiet Roar; Jallo Faber – Gentlemen
**Best Documentary Feature**: **Concerning Violence – Göran Hugo Olsson**; Apt. + Car + All I Have and Own – Clara Bodén; Ute på landet – Anders Jedenfors	**Best Shortfilm**: **Still Born – Åsa Sandzén**; But You Are a Dog – Malin Erixon; My Friend Lage – Eva Lindström
**Best Foreign Film**: **Two Days, One Night – Jean-Pierre and Luc Dardenne**; Boyhood – Richard Linklater; Ida – Pawel Pawlikowski	**Best Art Direction**: **Ulf Jonsson, Nicklas Nilsson, Sandra Parment, Isabel Sjöstrand** **and Julia Tegström – A Pigeon Sat on a Branch Reflecting on Existence**; Linda Janson – Gentlemen; Pelle Magnestam – Tjuvarnas jul – Trollkarlens dotter
**Best Original Score**: **Mattias Bärjed and Jonas Kullhammar – Gentlemen**; Erik Enocksson – The Quiet Roar; Hani Jazzar and Gorm Sundberg – A Pigeon Sat on a Branch Reflecting on Existence	**Best Sound Editing**: **Andreas Franck – The Quiet Roar**; Andreas Franck, Erlend Hogstad and Gisle Tveito – Force Majeure; Hugo Ekornes and Per Nyström – Gentlemen
**Makeup and Hair**: **Anna Carin Lock and Anja Dahl – Gentlemen**; Linda Sandberg – A Pigeon Sat on a Branch Reflecting on Existence; Susanna Rafstedt – Tjuvarnas jul – Trollkarlens dotter	**Best Costume Design**: **Cilla Rörby – Gentlemen**; Julia Tegström – A Pigeon Sat on a Branch Reflecting on Existence; Kicki Ilander – Tjuvarnas jul – Trollkarlens dotter
**Best Editing**: **Jacob Secher Schulsinger and Ruben Östlund – Force Majeure**; Alexandra Strauss – A Pigeon Sat on a Branch Reflecting on Existence; Kristofer Nordin – Gentlemen	**Gullspiran**: **Rose-Marie Strand**
**Cinema Audience Award**: **Micke & Veronica**; Bamse and the City of Thieves; The Anderssons Rock the Mountains	**Honorary Award**: **Liv Ullmann**
**Special efforts**: **Mats Holmgren**

== Multiple nominations and awards ==
The following films received one or multiple nominations:

- Thirteen: Gentlemen
- Ten: Force Majeure
- Seven: A Pigeon Sat on a Branch Reflecting on Existence
- Three: The Quiet Roar and Tjuvarnas jul – Trollkarlens dotter
- Two: Something Must Break and Flugparken
- One: My So-Called Father, Hemma, Apt. + Car + All I Have and Own, Concerning Violence and Ute på landet

The following four films received multiple awards:

- TBA
