= Basia Frydman =

Swedish actress, founder of the Jewish Theatre

- Born: 17 June 1946; Świebodzin, Poland
- Died: 21 August 2016 (aged 70)
- Education: Swedish National Academy of Mime and Acting
- Occupation: Actress
- Notable work: The Slingshot
- Spouse: Tomas Laustiola

Basia Frydman, (17 June 1946 - 21 August 2016) was a Swedish actress, engaged at the Royal Dramatic Theatre in Stockholm. She married Swedish actor Tomas Laustiola and mother of Rebecka Teper. She was one of the main members of the Royal Dramatic Theater in Stockholm, Sweden.

She studied at the Swedish National Academy of Mime and Acting until 1972. At the 29th Guldbagge Awards, she was nominated for the Best Actress award for her role in The Slingshot. In 1991 she, Tomas Laustiola and Pierre Fränckel founded the Judiska Teatern (Jewish Theatre)Jewish Theatre of Stockholm in Stockholm.

== Filmography ==
- 2002 – Beck – Kartellen
- 1999 – S:t Mikael (TV)
- 1999 – Mayn harts gehert tsum tatn
- 1995 – Sweet Home Blues
- 1995 – Morsarvet (TV)
- 1995 – Stannar du så springer jag
- 1993 – Pariserhjulet
- 1993 – Kådisbellan
- 1991 – Freud flyttar hemifrån...
- 1987 – Varuhuset (TV)
- 1985 – Anmäld försvunnen (TV)
- 1984 – Sköna juveler
- 1983 – Lille Luj och Änglaljus i strumpornas hus (TV)
