= Kådisbellan =

1989 autobiographical novel by Roland Schütt

- Author: Roland Schütt
- Language: Swedish
- Genre: autobiographical novel
- Published: 1989 (Sweden)
- Publication place: Sweden

Kådisbellan (The Condom Slingshot) is a 1989 Swedish autobiographical novel written by Roland Schütt. The book is about Schütt's life as child during the 1920s. His Jewish mother Zipa sells condoms, which was forbidden then, and Roland steals the condoms and makes slingshots and balloons of them. A film based on the novel, directed by Åke Sandgren, was released in 1993.
