= Gustaf Heden =

Swedish musician, writer and actor (born 1985)

Gustaf Heden (born 10 May 1985) is a Swedish musician, writer and actor. He is most known for the album Spectorbullets, the play Just a Few Hundred More and the screenplay Flaket.

== Music ==
In 2005, Heden founded the London band The Michelles with Tim Lalonde. After recognition from BBC and XFM radio DJ Rob Da Bank, the band was picked up by German record label Kitty-Yo. Heden's song "Springtime" was released as a 7" single in 2006, and was also used in the Julie Delpy film, Two Days in Paris.

In 2009, Heden started recording new songs with producer and Russell Burn in Edinburgh. The collaboration evolved into the band Spectorbullets, and in 2010 they released their eponymous debut album on Innes Reekie and Burn's new label Mayakovsky Produkts. For most part the work of a duo, with Burn on drums and Heden on remaining instruments and vocals, the album also featured poet and writer Paul Reekie (1962–2010) performing the vocal on opener "He Needs It", lyrics for the track "Drop" by Joanna Pickering, as well as contributions from Malcolm Ross and Davy Henderson. The album received four stars out of five from The Scotsman, The List and Uncut Magazine. The Scotsman described Spectorbullets as "the missing link between Syd Barrett and The Libertines".

== Theater ==
In 2013, Heden's play Just A Few Hundred More was selected into Thespis Theater Festival, New York. Heden staged the play for a four night run at the Cabrini Repertory Theater, and recorded a soundtrack of new music for the play with members of The Zen Archers and Brent Kirkpatrick, under the name The Amphetamines, a fictitious band which appeared in the script.

In 2014, Heden staged the play again, this time at Brooklyn dive Rbar. To promote the play, a video to one of The Amphetamines' songs from the soundtrack, "Jungle Cactus" was made by Fabian Svensson and Isac Stridsman, featuring Heden, Kirkpatrick and Eric Meier in an East Village Jungle.

After moving to Sweden, Heden continued writing plays, started theater and music group The Athletes and staged a reading of "In the Sand" at Häng Bar, Malmö, with among others Marika Lagercrantz in the cast and followed by a live performance of the soundtrack.

== Film ==
Heden wrote the screenplay to Fabian Svensson and Jens Klevje's Flaket, which premiered at Gothenburg Film Festival in 2016 and was co-produced with SVT. The film featured a cast of Swedish actors – Marika Lagercrantz, Reine Brynolfsson, Stina Ekblad, Lars-Erik Berenett and Iggy Malmborg.
