= Lisa Loven Kongsli =

Norwegian actress

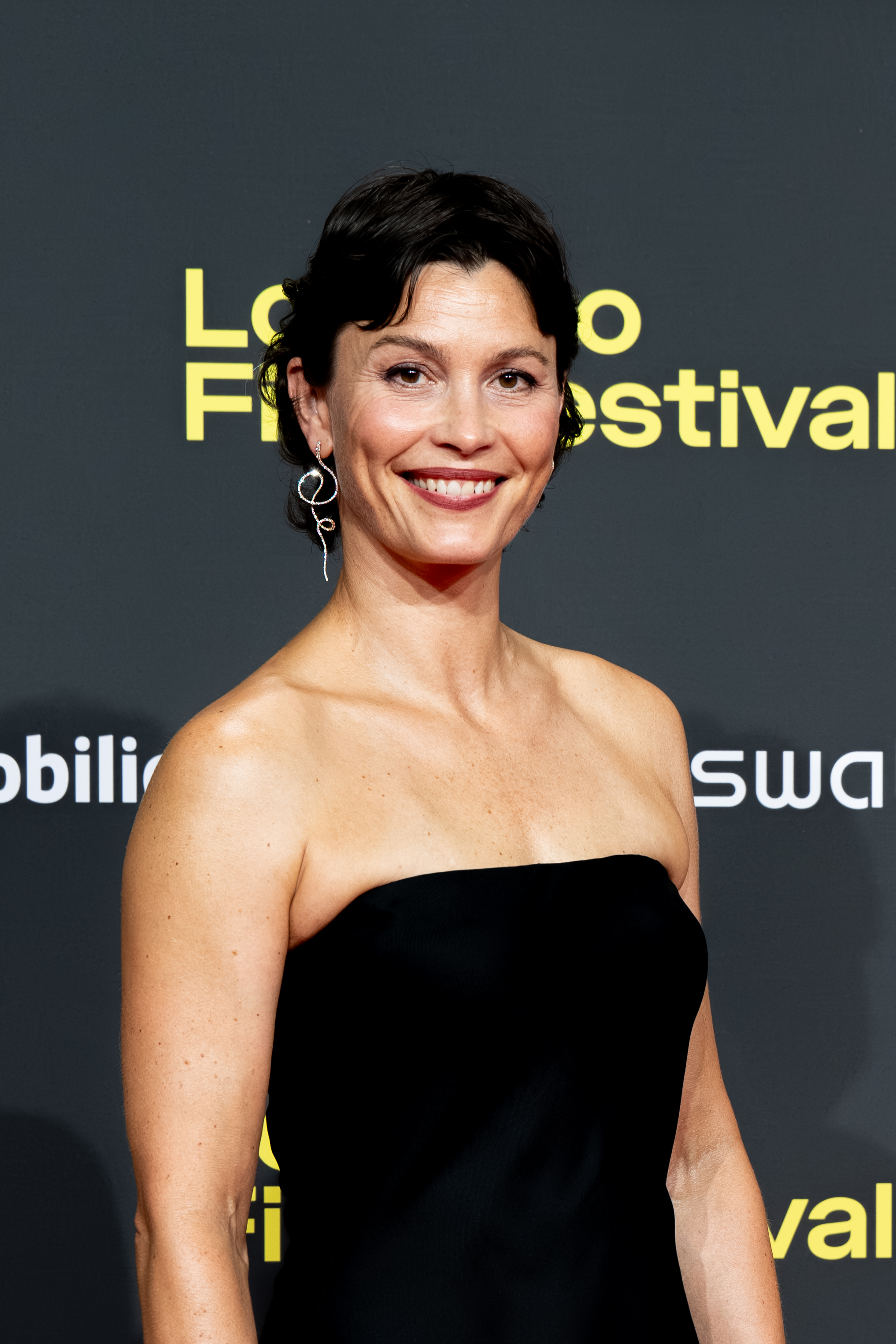
- At the Locarno Film Festival, 12 August 2025
- Born: Oslo, Norway
- Occupation: Actress
- Height: 177 cm (5 ft 10 in)

Lisa Loven Kongsli is a Norwegian actress. She debuted as an actress in 2008, and has since had key parts in Norwegian and other films, including Fatso (2008), Twigson (Knerten) (2009), and The Orheim Company (2012).

In 2014, she was nominated in the Best Actress category at the 50th Guldbagge Awards, for her role as Ebba in Ruben Östlund's film Force Majeure.

She played the role of the prime minister's wife in the TV series Occupied (2015). She played Amazon warrior Menalippe in the 2017 film Wonder Woman, reprising the role the same year in the film Justice League, as well as the subsequent 2021 director's cut Zack Snyder's Justice League.

In 2019, she starred in the Danish film Giraffe, directed by Anna Sofie Hartmann. In 2025, she appeared in Solomamma, by Janicke Askevold as Edith, a curiosity-driven journalist who, under false pretences, gets to know the (normally) anonymous sperm donor who fathered her young son. The film had its world premiere in main competition at the 78th Locarno Film Festival. In 2026, she appeared in Fjord, which had its world premiere at the main competition of the 2026 Cannes Film Festival on 18 May, where it won director Cristian Mungiu's second Palme d'Or.

== Filmography ==
List of film appearances, with year, title, and role shown
Year	Title	Role	Notes
2008	305		
2008	Fatso	Martine	
2009	The Angel (Engelen)	Girl in the treatment home	
2009	Knerten (Twigson) (2009)	Vivian Løkkeborg	
2011	Gresshoppen (The Grasshopper)	Vera	
2011	Kan du Snakke? (Can you speak?)		
2011	Himmelen bak huset (The sky behind the house)	Mom	
2012	The Orheim Company	Irene voksen	
2014	Force Majeure (Turist/Tourist)	Ebba	
2014	Sludd	Gabriel's Wife	
2016	Løvekvinnen (The Lioness)	Ruth	
2017	Wonder Woman	Menalippe	
2017	Justice League	Menalippe	
2018	Ashes in the Snow	Elena	
2019	Giraffe	Dara	
2020	Liker Stilen	Britt	
2021	Zack Snyder's Justice League	Menalippe	
2021	Clue: Maltesergåten	Anna Levin	
2022	Fathers and Mothers (Fædre & mødre)	Moa-Britt	
2022	October Passed Me By	Sara	
2023	Paradise	Lilith	
2024	Nr. 24	Gudrun Collett	
2024	Quiet Life	Dr. Olsson	
2024	Invitation to Self-Examination		
2024	Quisling: The Final Days	Heidi Olsen	
2024	Smoke Signals	Emily	
2025	Solomamma	Edith	
2025	The Woman in Cabin 10	Anne Bullmer	
2026	Fjord	Frida	

=== Television ===
List of television appearances, with year, title, and role shown
Year	Title	Role	Notes
2008	Hvaler (Maria)	Lone	
2010	The Orchestra Pit	Elise Myren	
2010-2011	Buzz Aldrin, hvor ble det av deg i alt mylderet? (Buzz Aldrin, where did you end up in all the chaos?)	Mia	
2015–2017	Occupied (Okkupert)	Astrid Berg	
2020–2022	Professionals	Zora Swann	
2020	The Letter for the King		
2022	The Shift (Dag & nat)		
2024	Quisling: The Final Days	Heidi Olsen	
2024	Kids in Crime	Doctor	
2025	The Elf and the Christmas Wonder	Hanna	
