= Guldbagge Award for Best Actress in a Leading Role =

Swedish film award

- Country: Sweden
- Presented by: Swedish Film Institute
- First award: 1964 (for acting in films released during the 1963/1964 film season)
- Currently held by: Bianca Kronlöf, Heartbeat (2024)
- Website: guldbaggen.se

The Guldbagge for Best Actress in a Leading Role is a Swedish film award presented annually by the Swedish Film Institute (SFI) as part of the Guldbagge Awards (Swedish: "Guldbaggen") to actresses working in the Swedish motion picture industry.

== Winners and nominees ==
Each Guldbagge Awards ceremony is listed chronologically below along with the winner of the Guldbagge Award for Actress in a Leading Role and the film associated with the award. Before 1991 the awards did not announce nominees, only winners. In the columns under the winner of each award are the other nominees for best actress, which are listed from 1991 and forward.

For the first nineteen ceremonies, the eligibility period spanned two calendar years. For example, the 2nd Guldbagge Awards presented on October 15, 1965, recognized films that were released between July, 1964 and June, 1965. Starting with the 20th Guldbagge Awards, held in 1985, the period of eligibility became the full previous calendar year from January 1 to December 31. The Awards presented at that ceremony were in respect of 18 months of film production owing to the changeover from the broken calendar year to the standard calendar year during 1984. Due to a mediocre film year, no awards ceremony was held in 1971.

Winners before the nomination system (1964–1990)
Winners under the nomination system (1991–present)

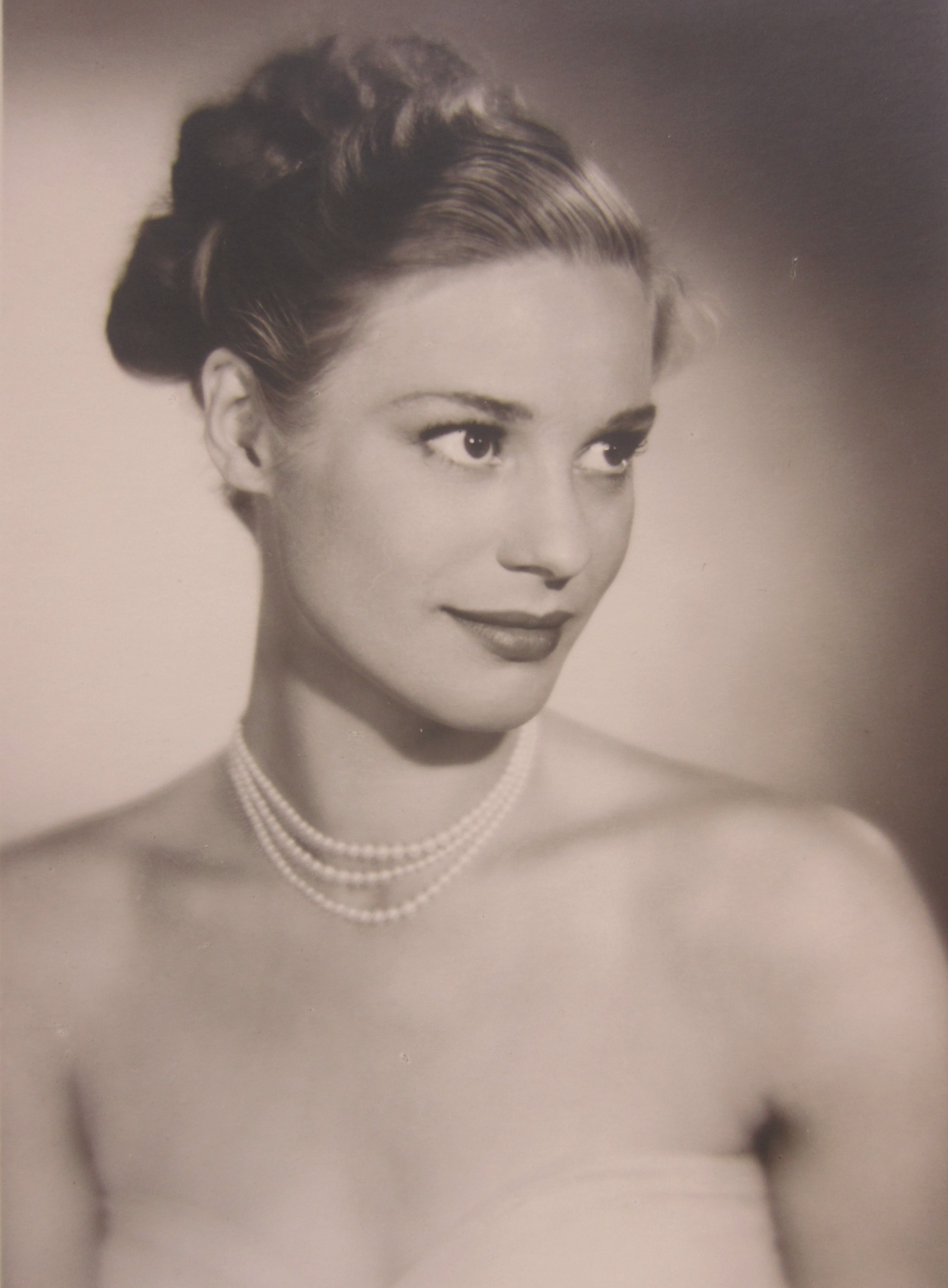
Ingrid Thulin won the first award in 1963/64 for her performance in The Silence.

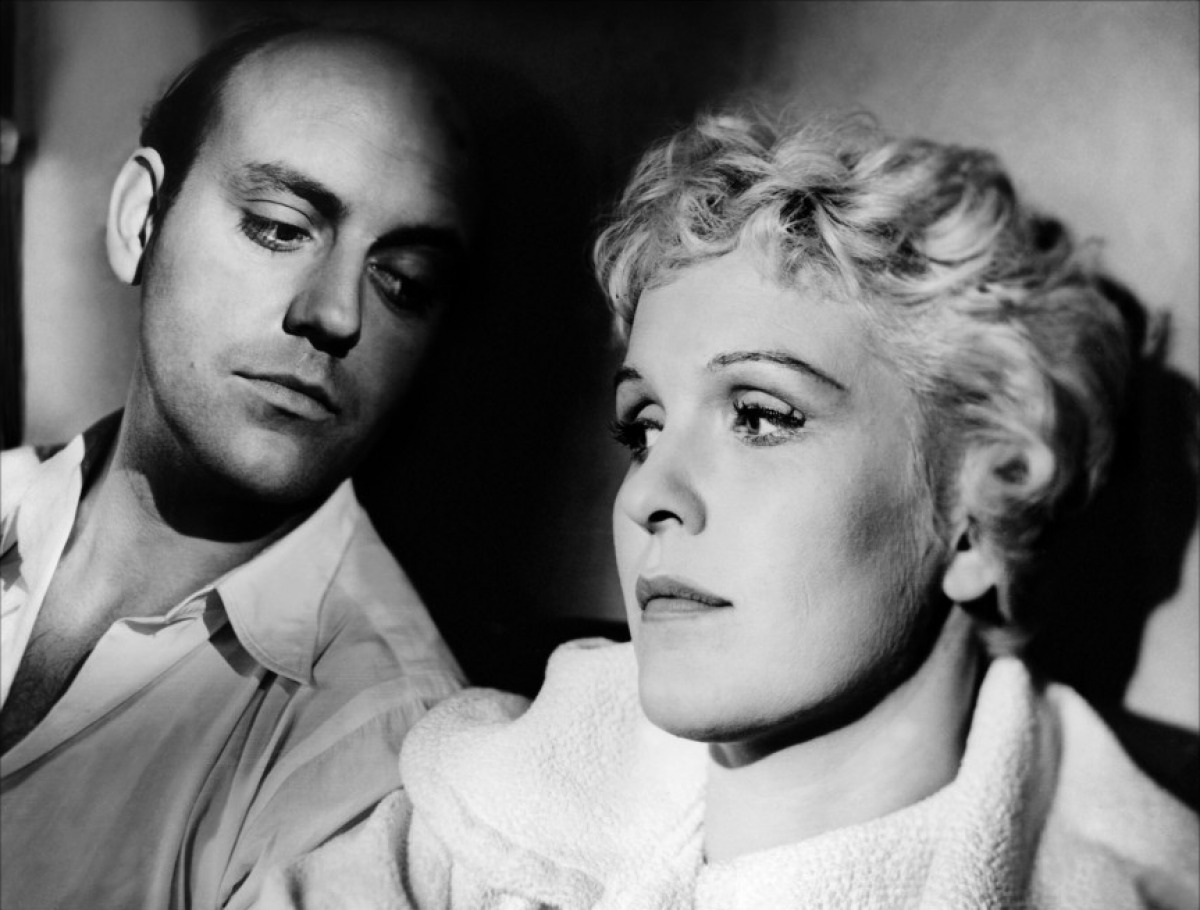
Eva Dahlbeck won in 1964/65 for her performance in The Cats.

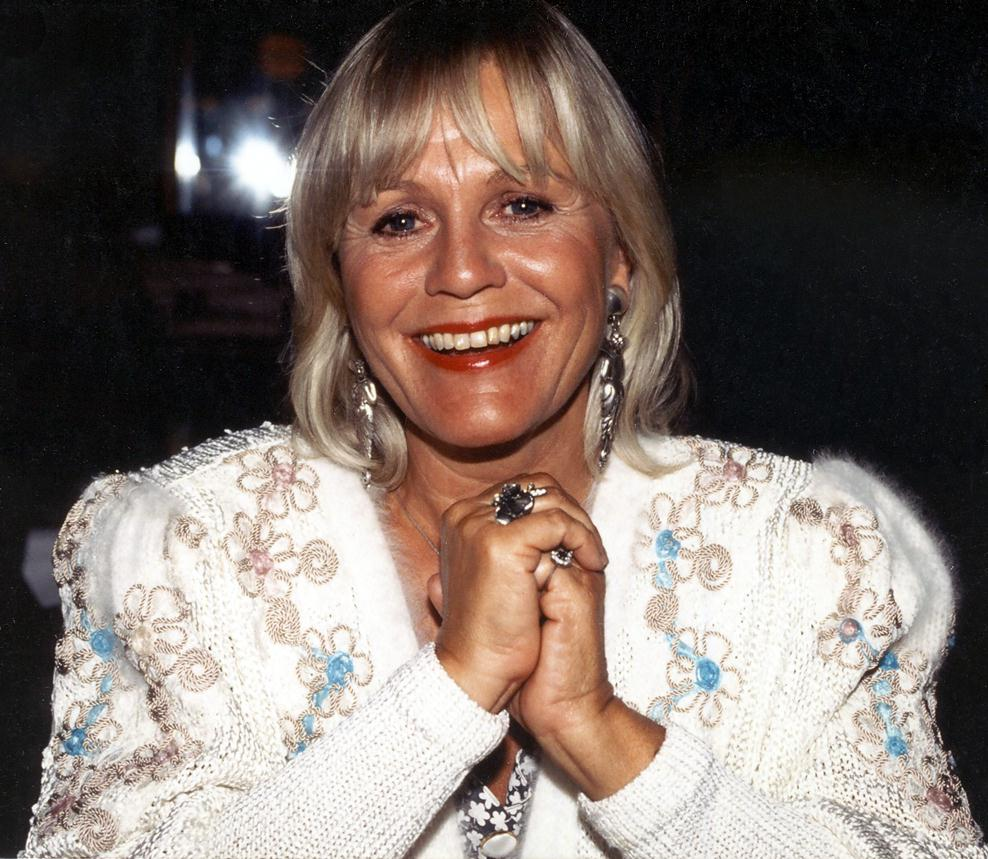
Christina Schollin won in 1965/66 for her performance in Ormen.

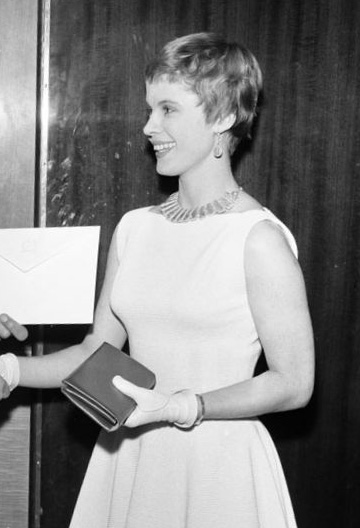
Bibi Andersson won in 1966/67 for her role in Persona.

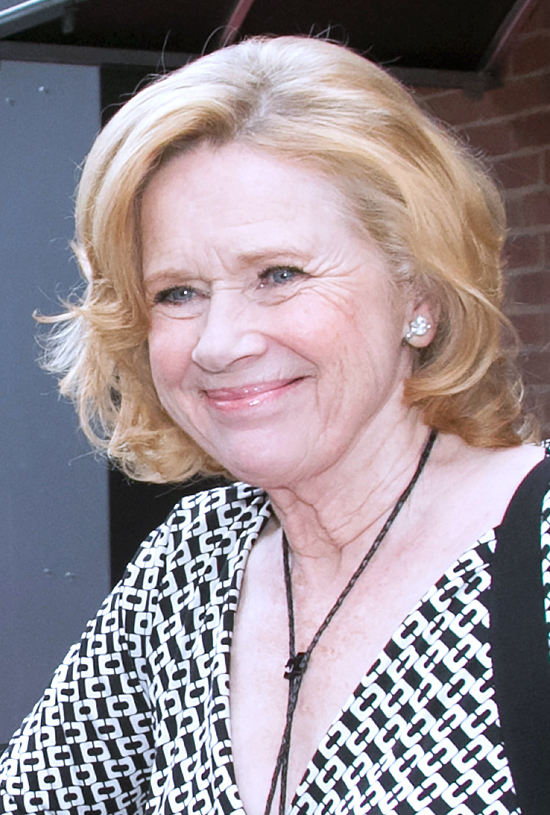
Liv Ullmann won in 1968/69 for her performance in Shame.

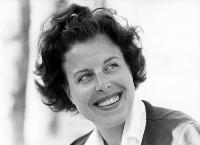
Margaretha Krook won in 1975/76 for her performance in Release the Prisoners to Spring.

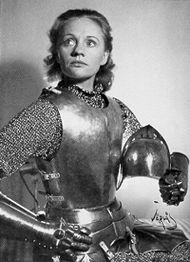
Gunn Wållgren won in 1980/81 for her performance in Sally and Freedom.

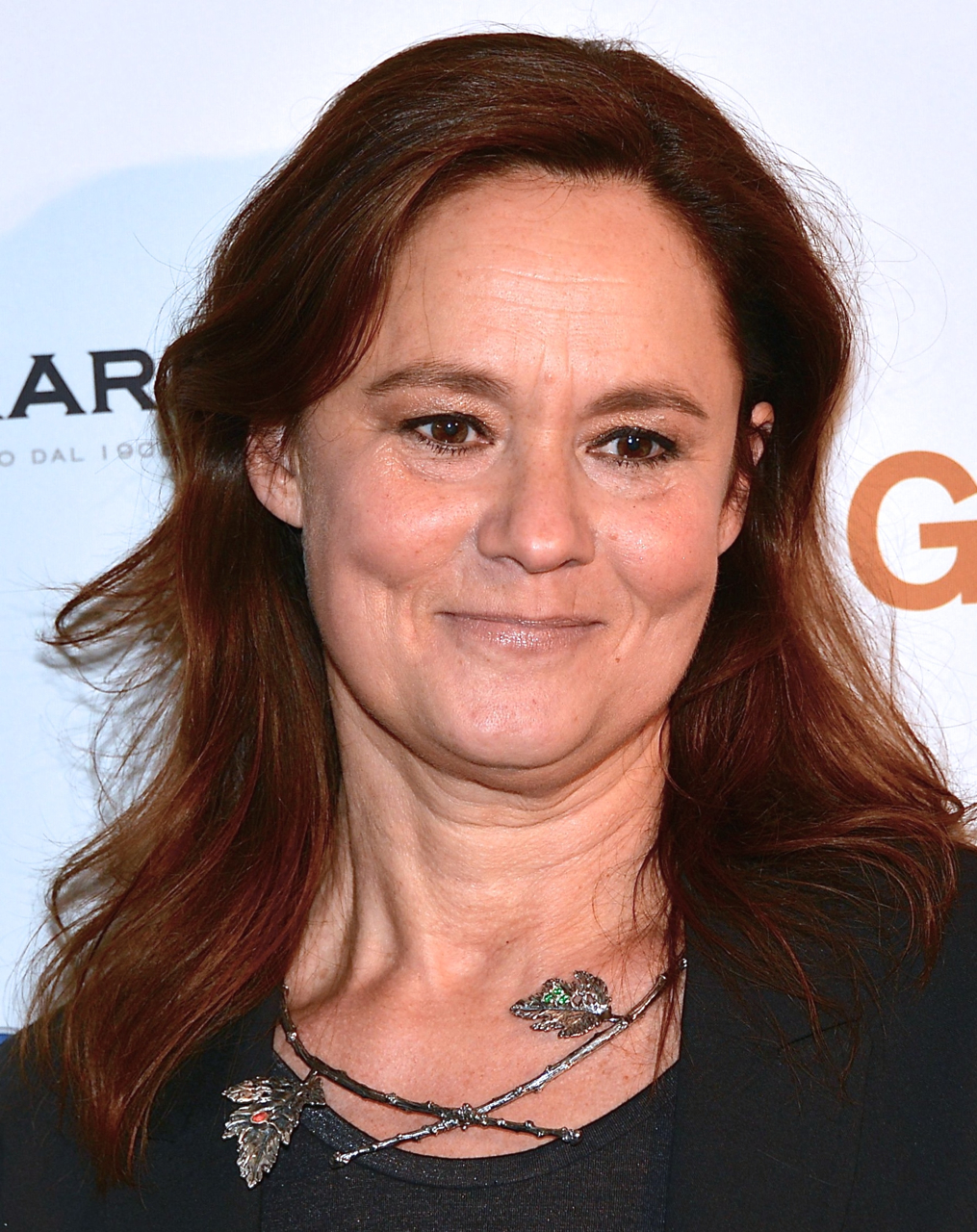
Pernilla August won in 1992 for her performance in The Best Intentions.

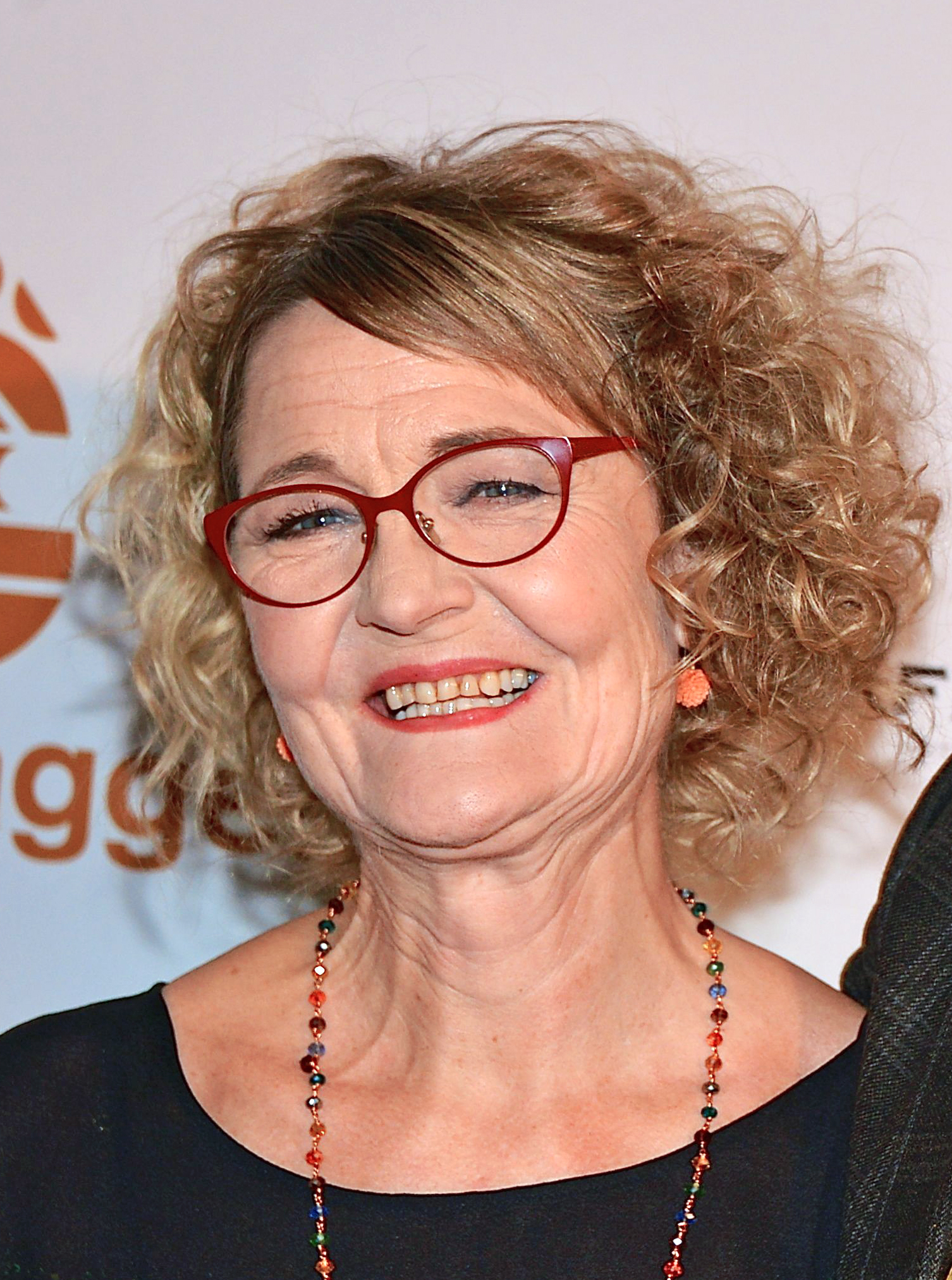
Ann Petrén won twice for her roles in 2003's Daybreak and 2011's Happy End.

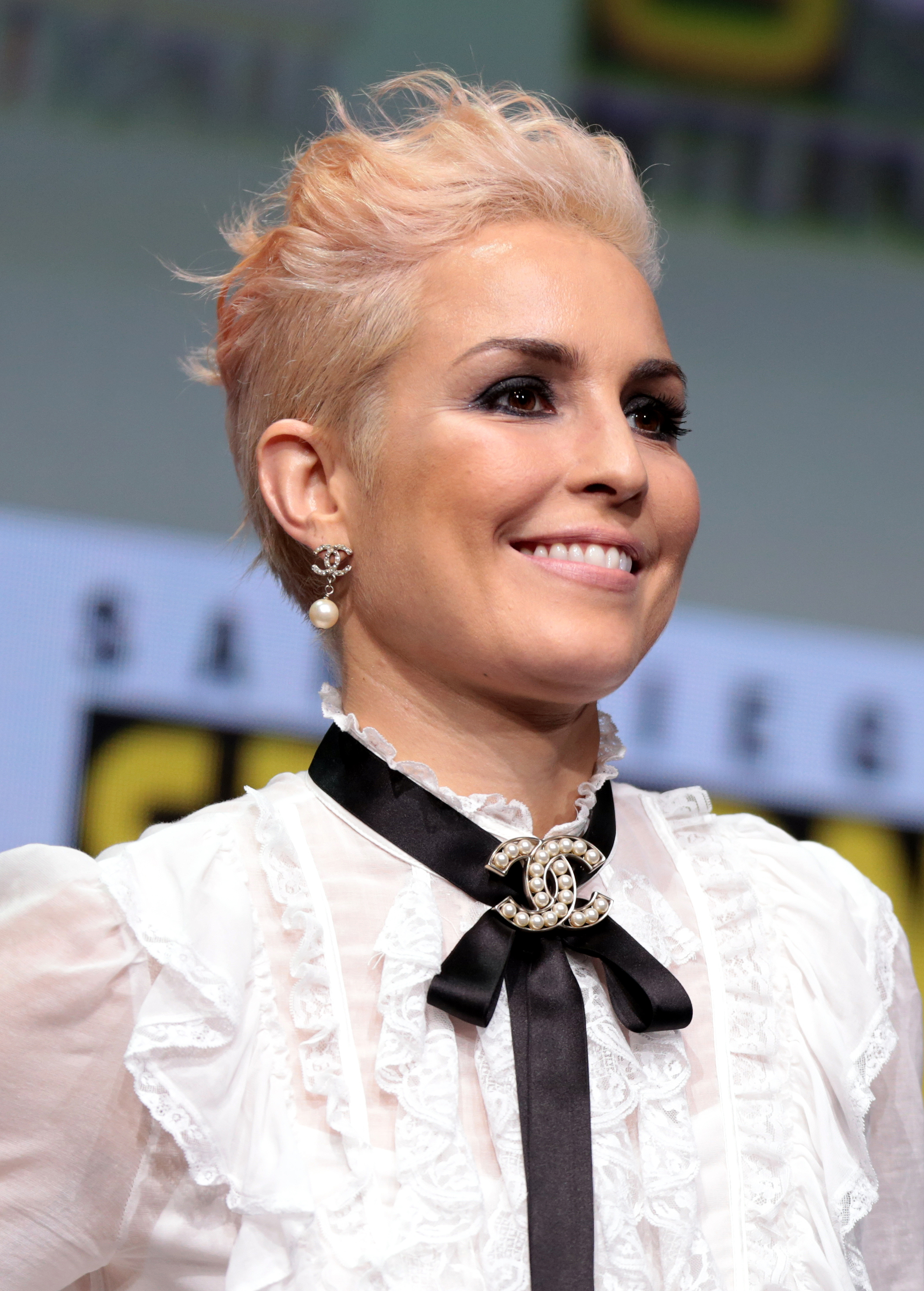
Noomi Rapace won in 2009 for her performance in The Girl with the Dragon Tattoo.

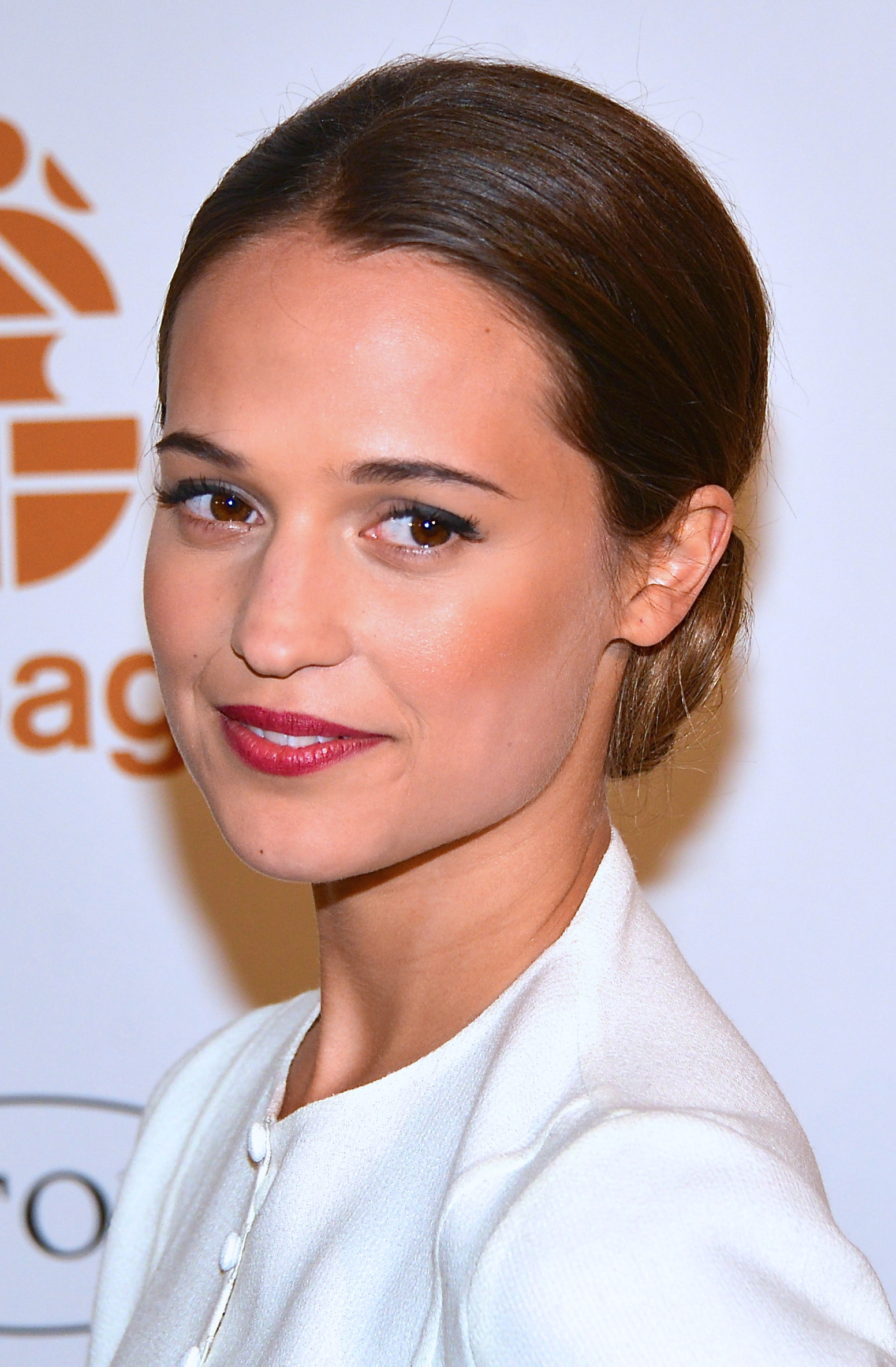
Alicia Vikander won in 2010 for her performance in Pure.

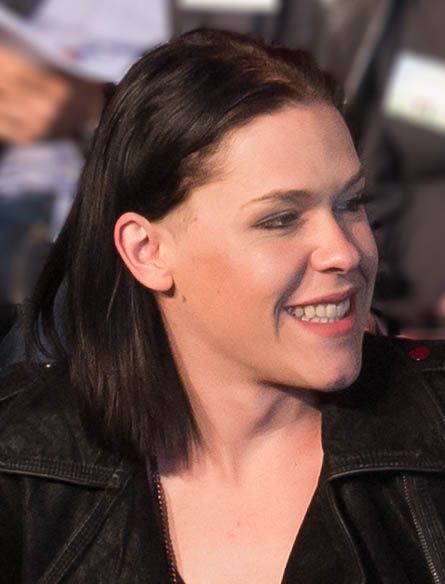
Saga Becker became the first transgender woman to win the award in 2014 for her performance in Something Must Break.

Year	Actress	Film	Role(s)	Ref.
1963/64 (1st)	Ingrid Thulin‡	The Silence	Ester	
1964/65 (2nd)	Eva Dahlbeck‡	The Cats	Marta Alleus	
1965/66 (3rd)	Christina Schollin‡	Ormen	Iréne Sandström	
1966/67 (4th)	Bibi Andersson‡	Persona	Alma, the Nurse	
1967/68 (5th)	Lena Nyman‡	I Am Curious (Yellow); I Am Curious (Blue)	Lena	
1968/69 (6th)	Liv Ullmann‡	Shame	Eva Rosenberg	
1969/70 (7th)	Anita Ekström‡	Jänken	Inger	
1970/71	— (no award given)	— (no award given)	— (no award given)	
1971/72 (8th)	Monica Zetterlund‡	The Apple War; The New Land	Anna Lindberg; Ulrika	
1972/73 (9th)	Harriet Andersson‡	Cries and Whispers	Agnes	
1973/74 (10th)	Inga Tidblad‡	Pistol	Alisia von Swärd	
1974/75 (11th)	Lis Nilheim‡	Maria	Maria Widén	
1975/76 (12th)	Margaretha Krook‡	Release the Prisoners to Spring	Flora	
1976/77 (13th)	Birgitta Valberg‡	Summer Paradise	Katha Wik	
1977/78 (14th)	Lil Terselius‡	Games of Love and Loneliness	Lydia Stille	
1978/79 (15th)	Sif Ruud‡	A Walk in the Sun	Siv Gustavsson	
1979/80 (16th)	— (no award given)	— (no award given)	— (no award given)	
1980/81 (17th)	Gunn Wållgren‡	Sally and Freedom	Sally's Mother	
1981/82 (18th)	Sunniva Lindekleiv‡	Little Ida	Ida	
1981/82 (18th)	Lise Fjeldstad‡	Little Ida	Ida's mother‡	
1981/82 (18th)	Rønnaug Alten	Little Ida	Mrs. Revaasen	
1982/83 (19th)	Malin Ek‡	Mamma	Gerd	
1982/83 (19th)	Kim Anderzon‡	Second Dance	Anna	
1984 (20th)	Gunilla Nyroos‡	A Hill on the Dark Side of the Moon	Sofia Kovalevskaya	
1985 (21st)	Malin Ek‡	False as Water	Clara	
1986 (22nd)	Stina Ekblad‡	Amorosa; The Serpent's Way	Agnes von Krusenstjerna; Tea	
1987 (23rd)	Lene Brøndum‡	Hip hip hurra!	Lille	
1988 (24th)	Lena T. Hansson‡	Lethal Film	Ingrid Stromboli	
1989 (25th)	Viveka Seldahl‡	S/Y Joy	Maja-Lena Skoog	
1990 (26th)	Malin Ek‡	The Guardian Angel	Livia Birkman	
1991 (27th)	Gunilla Röör‡	Freud Leaving Home	Freud	
1991 (27th)	Ghita Nørby	Freud Leaving Home	Rosha Cohen	
1991 (27th)	Gloria Tapia	Agnes Cecilia - en sällsam historia	Nora	
1992 (28th)	Pernilla August‡	The Best Intentions	Anna Åkerblom Bergman	
1992 (28th)	Helena Bergström	House of Angels	Fanny Zander	
1992 (28th)	Tova Magnusson Norling	Svart Lucia	Mikaela	
1993 (29th)	Helena Bergström‡	The Ferris Wheel; Sista dansen	Kickan; Tove Särlefalk	
1993 (29th)	Basia Frydman	The Slingshot	Zipa Schütt	
1993 (29th)	Marika Lagercrantz	Dreaming of Rita; Grandpa's Journey	Rita; Karin	
1994 (30th)	Suzanne Reuter‡	Yrrol	Various roles	
1994 (30th)	Ángeles Cruz	The Daughter of the Puma	Aschlop Pérez Pérez	
1994 (30th)	Viveka Seldahl	House of Angels – The Second Summer	Rut Flogfält	
1995 (31st)	Gunilla Röör‡	Between Summers	Torun Hagberg	
1995 (31st)	Marika Lagercrantz	All Things Fair	Viola	
1995 (31st)	Stina Ekblad	Like It Never Was Before	Gunnel Runeberg	
1996 (32nd)	Ghita Nørby‡	Hamsun	Marie Hamsun	
1996 (32nd)	Gunilla Nyroos	Rusar i hans famn	Monica	
1996 (32nd)	Lina Englund	Winter Bay	Elisabeth	
1997 (33rd)	Johanna Sällström‡	Beneath the Surface	Sandra	
1997 (33rd)	Camilla Lundén	Run for Your Life	Catti	
1997 (33rd)	Lena Endre	Run for Your Life	Ingrid	
1998 (34th)	Alexandra Dahlström‡	Show Me Love	Elin	
1998 (34th)	Rebecka Liljeberg‡	Show Me Love	Agnes	
1998 (34th)	Lena Endre	True Moments	Viivi	
1998 (34th)	Anna Wallander	Love Fools	Vivianne	
1999 (35th)	Katarina Ewerlöf‡	In Bed with Santa	Sara	
1999 (35th)	Harriet Andersson	Happy End	Marja Levander	
1999 (35th)	Regina Lund	The Lake	Lisa	
2000 (36th)	Lena Endre‡	Faithless	Marianne	
2000 (36th)	Sara Sommerfeld	Wings of Glass	Nazli	
2000 (36th)	Lia Boysen	The New Country	Louise	
2001 (37th)	Viveka Seldahl‡	A Song for Martin	Barbara	
2001 (37th)	Maria Lundqvist	Family Secrets	Mona Bendricks	
2001 (37th)	Helena Bergström	Deadline	Annika Bengtzon	
2002 (38th)	Oksana Akinshina‡	Lilja 4-ever	Lilja	
2002 (38th)	Elisabet Carlsson	Grabben i graven bredvid	Desirée Wallin	
2002 (38th)	Tuva Novotny	Den osynlige	Annelie	
2003 (39th)	Ann Petrén‡	Daybreak	Anita	
2003 (39th)	Pernilla August	Details	Ann	
2003 (39th)	Livia Millhagen	Miffo	Carola Christiansson	
2004 (40th)	Maria Kulle‡	Four Shades of Brown	Anna	
2004 (40th)	Sofia Helin	Dalecarlians	Mia	
2004 (40th)	Frida Hallgren	As It Is in Heaven	Lena	
2005 (41st)	Maria Lundqvist‡	Mother of Mine	Anna	
2005 (41st)	Tuva Novotny	Four Weeks in June	Sandra	
2005 (41st)	Amanda Ooms	Harry's Daughters	Ninni	
2006 (42nd)	Haddy Jallow‡	Säg att du älskar mig	Fatou	
2006 (42nd)	Oldoz Javidi	When Darkness Falls	Leyla	
2006 (42nd)	Amanda Ooms	Search	Lisa	
2007 (43rd)	Sofia Ledarp‡	To Love Someone	Lena	
2007 (43rd)	Julia Högberg	The New Man	Gertrud	
2007 (43rd)	Michelle Meadows	Darling	Eva	
2008 (44th)	Maria Heiskanen‡	Everlasting Moments	Maria Larsson	
2008 (44th)	Lena Endre	Heaven's Heart	Susanna	
2008 (44th)	Cecilia Milocco	Involuntary	Cecilia	
2009 (45th)	Noomi Rapace‡	The Girl with the Dragon Tattoo	Lisbeth Salander	
2009 (45th)	Malin Crépin	In Your Veins	Eva	
2009 (45th)	Stina Ekblad	A Rational Solution	Maj Fjellgren	
2010 (46th)	Alicia Vikander‡	Pure	Katarina	
2010 (46th)	Noomi Rapace	Beyond	Leena	
2010 (46th)	Pernilla August	Miss Kicki	Kicki	
2011 (47th)	Ann Petrén‡	Happy End	Jonna	
2011 (47th)	Helen Sjöholm	Simon and the Oaks	Karin Larsson	
2011 (47th)	Magdalena Poplawska	Between 2 Fires	Marta	
2012 (48th)	Nermina Lukac‡	Eat Sleep Die	Raša	
2012 (48th)	Pernilla August	Call Girl	Dagmar Glans	
2012 (48th)	Linda Molin	Bitch Hug	Kristin	
2013 (49th)	Edda Magnason‡	Waltz for Monica	Monica Zetterlund	
2013 (49th)	Anna Odell	The Reunion	Anna	
2013 (49th)	Gunilla Röör	Once a Year	Maria	
2014 (50th)	Saga Becker‡	Something Must Break	Sebastian	
2014 (50th)	Lisa Loven Kongsli	Force Majeure	Ebba	
2014 (50th)	Vera Vitali	My So-Called Father	Malin	
2015 (51st)	Malin Levanon‡	Drifters	Minna	
2015 (51st)	Shima Niavarani	She´s Wild Again Tonight	Shima	
2015 (51st)	Felice Jankell	Young Sophie Bell	Sophie Bell	
2016 (52nd)	Maria Sundbom‡	Flickan, mamman och demonerna	Siri	
2016 (52nd)	Karin Franz Körlof	A Serious Game	Lydia Stille	
2016 (52nd)	Tuva Jagell	Girls Lost	Kim	
2016 (52nd)	Jessica Szoppe	The Garbage Helicopter	Enesa	
2017 (53rd)	Lene Cecilia Sparrok‡	Sami Blood	Elle Marja	
2017 (53rd)	Evin Ahmad	Beyond Dreams	Mirja	
2017 (53rd)	Jennie Silfverhjelm	All Inclusive	Malin	
2017 (53rd)	Mia Skäringer	Solsidan	Anna	
2018 (54th)	Eva Melander‡	Border	Tina	
2018 (54th)	Alba August	Becoming Astrid	Astrid Lindgren	
2018 (54th)	Zahraa Aldoujaili	Amateurs	Aida	
2018 (54th)	Leonore Ekstrand	The Real Estate	Nojet	
2019 (55th)	Emelie Garbers ‡	Aniara	Mimaroben	
2019 (55th)	Pernilla August	Britt-Marie Was Here	Britt-Marie	
2019 (55th)	Vigdis Hentze Björck	The Birdcatcher's Son	Johanna	
2019 (55th)	Sanna Sundqvist	Call Mom!	Niki	
2020 (56th)	Ane Dahl Torp ‡	Charter	Alice	
2020 (56th)	Irma von Platen	Inland	X	
2020 (56th)	Josefin Neldén	Psychosis in Stockholm	The Mother	
2020 (56th)	Josefine Stofkoper	Psychosis in Stockholm	The Daughter	
2021 (57th)	Sofia Kappel ‡	Pleasure	Linnéa / Bella Cherry	
2021 (57th)	Lisa Carlehed	Utvandrarna	Kristina	
2021 (57th)	Wendy Chinchilla Araya	Clara Sola	Clara	
2021 (57th)	Cecilia Milocco	Knackningar	Molly	
2022 (58th)	Sigrid Johnson ‡	Comedy Queen	Sasha	
2022 (58th)	Bahar Pars	Maya Nilo (Laura)	Nilo	
2022 (58th)	Vera Vitali	Länge leve Bonusfamiljen	Lisa	
2022 (58th)	Katia Winter	The Year I Started Masturbating	Hanna	
2023 (59th)	Marall Nasiri ‡	Opponent	Maryam	
2023 (59th)	Karin Franz Körlof	En dag kommer allt det här bli ditt	Lisa	
2023 (59th)	Lena Olin	Andra Akten	Eva	
2023 (59th)	Sanna Sundqvist	Thank You, I'm Sorry	Sara	
2024 (60th)	Bianca Kronlöf ‡	Så länge hjärtat slår	Hanne	
2024 (60th)	Mzia Arabuli	Crossing	Lia	
2024 (60th)	Asta Kamma August	The Hypnosis	Vera	
2024 (60th)	Josefin Neldén	The Swedish Torpedo	Sally	

== See also ==
- Academy Award for Best Actress
- BAFTA Award for Best Actress in a Leading Role
- Critics' Choice Movie Award for Best Actress (BFCA)
- Golden Globe Award for Best Actress – Motion Picture Drama
- Golden Globe Award for Best Actress – Motion Picture Musical or Comedy
- Screen Actors Guild Award for Outstanding Performance by a Female Actor in a Leading Role
