= The Ferris Wheel (film) =

1993 film

- Directed by: Clas Lindberg
- Written by: Clas Lindberg
- Produced by: Lennart Dunér
- Starring: Jakob Eklund
- Cinematography: Andra Lasmanis
- Release date: 8 October 1993
- Running time: 106 minutes
- Country: Sweden
- Language: Swedish

The Ferris Wheel (Swedish: Pariserhjulet) is a 1993 Swedish drama film directed by Clas Lindberg. Lindberg won the award for Best Director at the 29th Guldbagge Awards. It was also nominated for Best Film and Helena Bergström won the award for Best Actress.

== Cast ==
- Jakob Eklund as Mårten
- Helena Bergström as Kickan
- Claes Malmberg as Risto
- Christer Banck as Raymond
- Peter Hüttner as Chief Inspector Stark
- Robert Gustafsson as Karlberg
- Göran Boberg as Supervisor
- Jessica Zandén as Mrs. Lindström
- Lena-Pia Bernhardsson as Secretary
- Lars Göran Persson as Knut Kallsten
- Regina Lund as Agneta Pligberg
