= Dreaming of Rita =

1993 film

- Directed by: Jon Lindström
- Written by: Rita Holst; Jon Lindström
- Produced by: Börje Hansson
- Starring: Marika Lagercrantz
- Cinematography: Kjell Lagerroos
- Release date: 22 January 1993
- Running time: 104 minutes
- Country: Sweden
- Language: Swedish

Dreaming of Rita (Swedish: Drömmen om Rita) is a 1993 Swedish comedy film directed by Jon Lindström. Marika Lagercrantz was nominated for the award for Best Actress at the 29th Guldbagge Awards.

== Cast ==
- Marika Lagercrantz as Rita
- Philip Zandén as Steff
- Yaba Holst as Sandra
- Adam Blänning as Adam
- Per Oscarsson as Bob
- Patrik Ersgård as Erik
- Lise Ringheim as Sabine
- Gert Fylking as Rolling
- Beryl Kornhill as Astrid
