= Force Majeure (film) =

2014 film by Ruben Östlund

- Swedish theatrical release poster
- Swedish: Turist
- Literally: Tourist
- Directed by: Ruben Östlund
- Written by: Ruben Östlund
- Produced by: Erik Hemmendorff; Marie Kjellson; Philippe Bober
- Starring: Johannes Bah Kuhnke; Lisa Loven Kongsli; Kristofer Hivju; Vincent Wettergren; Clara Wettergren; Fanni Metelius; Karin Faber
- Cinematography: Fredrik Wenzel
- Edited by: Ruben Östlund; Jacob Secher Schulsinger
- Music by: Ola Fløttum
- Production companies: Plattform Produktion; Film i Väst; Rhône-Alpes Cinéma; Société Parisienne de Production; Coproduction Office; Motlys
- Distributed by: TriArt Film (Sweden); BAC Films (France); Ost for Paradis (Denmark); Arthaus (Norway)
- Release dates: 18 May 2014 (Cannes); 15 August 2014 (Sweden); 24 October 2014 (Norway); 11 December 2014 (Denmark); 28 January 2015 (France)
- Running time: 119 minutes
- Countries: Sweden; France; Denmark; Norway
- Languages: English; French; Norwegian; Swedish
- Box office: $4.1 million

Force Majeure (French: [fɔʁs maʒœʁ]; Swedish: Turist, lit. 'Tourist') is a 2014 black comedy film written and directed by Ruben Östlund. It follows the marital tension resulting from an apparent avalanche in the French Alps, during which the husband prioritizes his escape over the safety of his wife and two children. The title Force Majeure used for the film in some English-speaking countries comes from force majeure, a contractual clause freeing both parties from liability in the event of unexpected disasters.

Force Majeure was acclaimed upon release, with critics praising its script and cinematography. It won the Best Film award at the 50th Guldbagge Awards and was named one of the best films of 2014 by various publications.

== Plot ==
A Swedish businessman named Tomas, his Norwegian wife Ebba, their young daughter Vera, and their pre-schooler son Harry stay at a luxury resort in the French Alps. On their second day, they see a controlled avalanche as they are having lunch outdoors on the deck of a restaurant. The powder cloud of the avalanche gives the appearance that the snow is rising and will wipe out everyone on the deck. Tomas, who is filming the avalanche on his phone, panics and runs as the deck quickly empties of patrons, leaving Ebba with their children engulfed in a dense fog. Patrons return to their tables as the fog dissipates, and no one is hurt.

That evening, they eat dinner with one of Ebba's friends, Charlotte, who has picked up an American man for the evening. Ebba tells the story of the avalanche in English, but Tomas insists he did not run away from the table, and in Swedish adds that one cannot run in ski boots. They argue in front of their embarrassed guests. Ebba is angry that he would not admit he ran away from the avalanche, abandoning them. He is clearly ashamed and says he does not agree with "her version", further infuriating Ebba.

Ebba decides she would like a day of skiing by herself. She has drinks with Charlotte as the woman says goodbye to another man. Ebba confronts her friend about her adultery, asking her if she loves her husband and children. Charlotte says she is fine with having an open relationship with her husband, and that she is happy if he finds a woman to have great sex with, as he does with her. Ebba becomes more insistent, and the friend advises them not to argue, and leaves.

Mats, one of Tomas's old friends, joins them at the resort with his young girlfriend, Fanny. They join Tomas and Ebba for dinner in their suite. After dinner and a lot of wine, Ebba interrupts the conversation to recount the story of the avalanche, to the silent horror of Mats and Fanny. Tomas curls up with Harry to play a video game, and listens to Mats who insists that we are not ourselves in emergencies, naming the Estonia disaster as an example. Ebba says Tomas won't admit what he did. Tomas returns and again insists he has a different perspective. Ebba fetches Tomas's phone and has the four of them watch the video of the incident. Tomas reluctantly agrees the footage shows someone running, but is silent when Mats speculates that Tomas was running away so that he could come back and dig out his family later. As Fanny and Mats leave, Fanny suggests that she would expect Mats to react in the same way as Tomas. Mats is offended, and after arguing all night their relationship is changed for the rest of the trip.

Tomas and Mats ride the ski lift in silence. They ski down fresh powder. Mats suggests Tomas try primal screaming, and Tomas does, screaming swear words into the Alps. Tomas later confesses to Ebba that he hates himself, his cowardice, his cheating in games with his kids, and his unfaithfulness. He weeps as his children huddle next to him and cry together, having heard their parents argue.

On their final day, the family ascends on the ski lift in silence. Ebba is concerned about the thick fog. Tomas says he will go first, then the children, then she can follow. Ebba gets lost in the fog, and Tomas briefly leaves the children alone to rescue her, returning carrying her down the slope shortly after. He sets her down, grinning. Ebba, seemingly unharmed, retrieves her skis.

As the family and their friends leave the resort by coach down the winding mountain road, Ebba decides the driver is incompetent after some erratic driving and, in a state of fear, demands to be let off and flees the bus. Panic ensues, and Mats takes charge, insisting women and children get off first. Eventually, all exit the bus except for Ebba's friend, and the group descends the road on foot. Mats and Fanny are walking apart. Ebba asks Mats to carry Vera. A stranger offers Tomas a cigarette, and initially Tomas declines, but then accepts. Harry asks his father if he smokes — he has not during the entire vacation — and Tomas replies that he does.

== Cast ==
- Johannes Bah Kuhnke as Tomas
- Lisa Loven Kongsli as Ebba
- Clara Wettergren as Vera
- Vincent Wettergren as Harry
- Kristofer Hivju as Mats
- Fanni Metelius as Fanny
- Karin Myrenberg Faber as Charlotte
- Brady Corbet as the American
- Johannes Moustos as the cleaner

== Production ==
Prior to entering film school, Ruben Östlund had created ski films, and wanted to use his knowledge and experience from that in a film concerned with existential issues.

Ruben Östlund attributed the inspiration for the film's key scenes to a few viral YouTube videos which he felt corroborated the plausible situation and emotions of the characters. Matt Patches, in the introduction to an interview with director, reasons that "if someone captured an event or action or pang of emotion on camera and uploaded to the Internet, then it happened in real life. And it could happen in Force Majeure." The scene where Ebba demands to be let off the bus is based on the YouTube viral video titled "Idiot Spanish bus driver almost kills students".

Most of the exteriors were shot in Les Arcs, a ski resort in Savoie, France, over the course of three weeks in March and April 2013. The ending of the film was shot on the eastern ramp of the Stelvio Pass. The interiors were shot at the Copperhill Mountain Lodge in Åre, Sweden, over an additional four weeks during the month of May 2013.

== Reception ==
=== Box office ===
Force Majeure grossed $1.4 million in the United States and Canada, and $2.7 million in other territories, for a worldwide total of $4.1 million.

=== Critical response ===
On Rotten Tomatoes, the film has a 94% approval rating, based on 165 reviews, with an average rating of 8/10. The site's critical consensus reads, "Gleefully uncomfortable, Force Majeure is a relationship drama that's hard to watch — and just as difficult to ignore." On Metacritic, the film has a score of 87 out of 100, based on 37 reviews, indicating "universal acclaim".

=== Accolades ===
The film was selected to compete in the Un Certain Regard section at the 2014 Cannes Film Festival, where it won the Jury Prize. It was also screened in the Special Presentations section of the 2014 Toronto International Film Festival.

The film was nominated for the 2014 Nordic Council Film Prize. It was also selected as the Swedish entry for the Best Foreign Language Film at the 87th Academy Awards, making the early round of shortlist, but was not a nominee. It was nominated for the Best Foreign Language Film at the 72nd Golden Globe Awards.

At the 50th Guldbagge Awards in Sweden it won Best Film, Best Director, Best Supporting Actor, Best Screenplay, Best Cinematography, and Best Editing and was nominated for Best Actor, Best Actress, Best Supporting Actress, and Best Sound Editing.

== Adaptations ==
An English-language remake of the film starring Will Ferrell and Julia Louis-Dreyfus, titled Downhill, was released in 2020. Unlike Force Majeure, Downhill was more traditionally comedic.

A stage version starring Rory Kinnear was performed at The Donmar Warehouse in London in 2022.

== See also ==
- List of submissions to the 87th Academy Awards for Best Foreign Language Film
- List of Swedish submissions for the Academy Award for Best Foreign Language Film
- List of films featuring drones
