= Dirty Diaries =

- DVD cover
- Directed by: Ester Martin Bergsmark; Mia Engberg; Sara Kaaman; Pella Kågerman; Wolfe Madam; Elin Magnusson; Tora Mårtens; Universal Pussy; Jennifer Rainsford; Nelli Roselli; Ingrid Ryberg; Joanna Rytel; Åsa Sandzén; Marit Östberg
- Produced by: Mia Engberg
- Edited by: Hanna Lejonqvist; Marinella Angusti
- Music by: Fever Ray; Bonnie Li; Fox'n Wolf
- Distributed by: Njutafilms
- Release date: September 3, 2009
- Running time: 105 minutes
- Languages: Swedish; English; French
- Budget: 500,000 SEK

Dirty Diaries is a 2009 collection of thirteen short films of feminist pornography made by Swedish activists and artists and produced by Mia Engberg. The individual films are highly diverse in content, although many of them feature humour and different forms of queer sex. The creative decisions were based on a manifesto with the aim to create pornography that is non-commercial and follows feminist ideals.

The film sparked controversy before and after its release because of sexually provocative content and the fact that it was mainly financed through public funds. Film critics were split in their reception; some found the film amusingly provocative while others thought it was dull.

== Plot ==
The thirteen short films that make up the entire collection vary considerably in length and style.

1. Skin features two figures, one male and one female, clad in full-body nylon stockings caressing and kissing each other intimately. After a while, the two figures begin to cut open the nylon with a pair of scissors to reveal the naked skin underneath, and engage in oral and penetrative sex. There is no dialogue and only soft background music. Directed by Elin Magnusson.
2. Fruitcake is a mix of close-up shots of various objects and human anuses being licked, dripped with saliva, fingered or penetrated with sex toys. The images are accompanied by a monologue. Directed by Sara Kaaman and Ester Martin Bergsmark.
3. Night Time shows a woman kissing a man passionately while filming herself. They both proceed to perform oral sex on each other while the woman later uses a vibrator to reach orgasm. Directed by Nelli Roselli.
4. Dildoman is the only animated film in the collection. It shows images of a men's club where masturbating adult or middle-aged men watch two women having sex on a pool table. One of the men is then suddenly grabbed by one of the women, who now dwarfs him. The woman proceeds to insert the man into her vagina. When she reaches climax, the man inside her goes limp. The film ends with a shot of the front of the men's club. Directed by Åsa Sandzén.
5. Body Contact portrays two women, one filming the other, searching for a man to have sex with on the Swedish dating site Body Contact. A man with a Scanian dialect shows his penis to the women through a webcam. Later the man pays them a visit, but is unnerved by the presence of the camera. The two women convince him to have sex. Directed by Pella Kågerman.
6. Red Like Cherry is a series of quick, blurred clips of unidentifiable people swimming in the surf of a beach and then having sex in a room. Directed by Tora Mårtens.
7. On Your Back Woman! is a series of clips of nude or semi-nude women wrestling each other. Directed by Wolfe Madam.
8. Phone Fuck features a newly separated lesbian couple who talk over the telephone and eventually engage in phone sex. Directed by Ingrid Ryberg.
9. Brown Cock shows the naked pelvis of a Caucasian woman. Her vagina is penetrated by a brown dildo held by a mixed-race woman, who then goes on to fist her. The two women engage in sex-related dialogue throughout the scene, commenting the sex act. Directed by Universal Pussy.
10. Flasher Girl on tour is a semi-documentary manifesto of Swedish artist Joanna Rytel and her alter ego Flasher Girl, a woman flasher. In the film she travels to Paris where she exposes herself to men and expounds on her motives for doing so. Directed by Joanna Rytel.
11. Authority starts with a lightly clad androgynous woman breaking into an abandoned lot in Berlin and spraying graffiti. She is caught in the act by a similarly androgynous female police officer, who chases her into an empty building but is eventually overpowered and bound. The two then engage in rough sexual activities, including spitting, slapping and anal sex. Directed by Marit Östberg, who later went on to direct 'When We Are Together We Can Be Everywhere' (2015).
12. For the Liberation of Men is an abstract mix of clips of a man clad in women's clothing masturbating and close-ups of an old woman's face. Directed by Jennifer Rainsford.
13. Come Together, the short that Engberg and others made before the twelve actual Dirty Diaries shorts, is included last in the collection. It consists of Engberg and several others filming themselves with mobile phones while masturbating and eventually reaching orgasm. Directed by Mia Engberg.

== Production ==
The idea for creating Dirty Diaries emerged after Engberg and some of her friends made Come Together for the Stockholm International Film Festival. It was a short film where all the participants filmed themselves with mobile phone cameras while masturbating. Come Together received a large amount of negative commentary, primarily from men, who complained about the actor-photographers being unattractive. To Engberg, this was proof that pornographic films demanded that their female participants should be seen as pleasing to their primarily male audience. Engberg had previously made another feminist pornographic short called Selma and Sofie, which enjoyed some success. This and Engberg's record of other successful cultural ventures motivated the Swedish Film Institute to supply an initial 350,000 Swedish kronor, later supplemented with an additional 150,000.

== Dirty Diaries Manifesto ==
The film was based on a ten-point manifesto made available on the official website:

1. Beautiful the way we are

To hell with the sick beauty ideals! Deep self-hatred keeps a lot of women's energy and creativity sapped. The energy that could be focused into exploring our own sexuality and power is being drained off into diets and cosmetics. Don't let the commercial powers control your needs and desires.

2. Fight for your right to be horny

Male sexuality is seen as a force of nature that has to be satisfied at all costs while women's sexuality is accepted only if it adapts to men's needs. Be horny on your own terms.

3. A good girl is a bad girl

We are fed up with the cultural cliché that sexually active and independent women are either crazy or lesbian and therefore crazy. We want to see and make movies where Betty Blue, Ophelia and Thelma & Louise don't have to die in the end.

4. Smash capitalism and patriarchy

The porn industry is sexist because we live in a patriarchal capitalist society. It makes profit out of people's needs for sex and erotica and women get exploited in the process. To fight sexist porn you have to smash capitalism and patriarchy.

5. As nasty as we wanna be

Enjoy, take charge or let go. Say NO when you want, to be able to say YES when YOU want.

6. Legal and free abortion is a human right!

Everyone has the right to control their own body. Millions of women suffer from unwanted pregnancies and die from illegal abortions every year. Fuck the moral right for preaching against birth control and sex information.

7. Fight the real enemy!

Censorship cannot liberate sexuality. It is impossible to change the image of women's sexuality if sexual images in themselves are taboo. Don't attack women for displaying sex. Attack sexism for trying to control our sexuality.

8. Stay Queer

A lot of opposition to erotica is homophobic and even more transphobic. We don't believe in the fight between the sexes but in the fight against sexes. Identify as any gender you want and make love to whoever you want. Sexuality is diverse.

9. Use Protection

"I'm not saying go out an' do it, but if you do, strap it up before you smack it up." (Missy Elliott)

10. Do it yourself

Erotica is good and we need it. We truly believe that it is possible to create an alternative to the mainstream porn industry by making sexy films we like.

== Release ==
Dirty Diaries was first shown at a gala premiere at the small neighbourhood cinema Bio Rio near Hornstull in Stockholm on September 3 and released on DVD the same day. There were further screenings on the weekend of September 5–6, which drew large crowds. Though public interest was intense and all screenings were sold out, no further shows in Stockholm were scheduled. The reason stated by Bio Rio and Engberg was that the cinema screenings were intended to be limited, and that the films were intended to be enjoyed on DVD.

The film also saw limited theatrical distribution in Finland.

== Reception ==
=== Political reactions ===
The funding from the Swedish Film Institute (SFI), which receives most of its funding directly from the Swedish government, sparked controversy in Sweden. Using tax money to finance pornography was considered offensive by some. Beatrice Fredriksson, member of the Moderate Party youth organization and author of the Anti-Feminist Initiative Blog, labelled the use of public funds as hypocrisy, since mainstream pornography would never receive the same financial support. Marit Östberg, one of the film's directors, defended the public financing of the project by stressing that the values behind Dirty Diaries are radically different from that of mainstream pornography. Dirty Diaries also received criticism from feminists critical against pornography in general. Prolific Swedish director and feminist Suzanne Osten voiced scepticism, referring to her belief that pornography is inherently objectifying and that feminist pornography would therefore constitute an oxymoron.

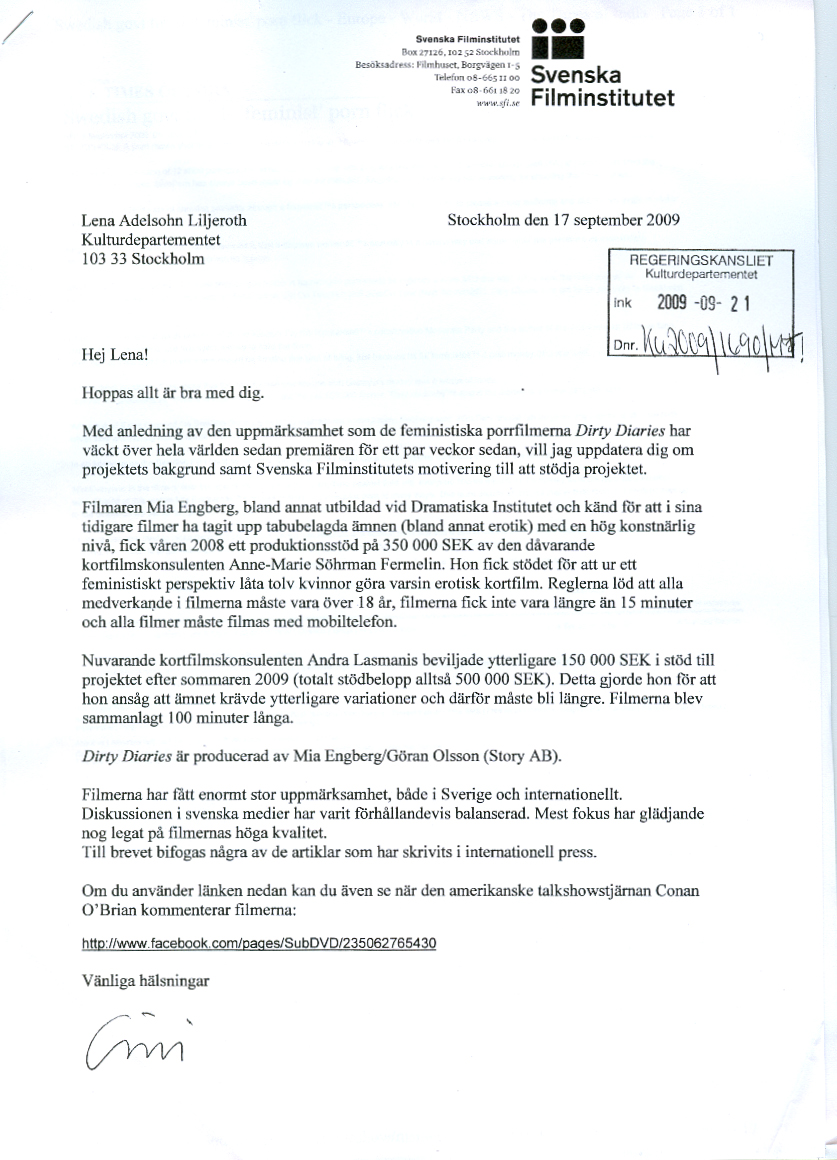
A scan of the letter from the director of the Swedish Film Institute Cissi Elwin Frenkel to Minister of Culture, Lena Adelsohn Liljeroth.

Due to the debate over the use of tax money for financing a pornographic feature, the director of the SFI Cissi Elwin Frenkel considered it necessary to write a letter to Swedish Minister of Culture, Lena Adelsohn Liljeroth, and explain exactly why it received the financing. Elwin Frenkel repeatedly maintained that SFI does not support pornography, and that Dirty Diaries received financing because it aimed to try a new approach to depicting female sexuality.

Rasmus Malm in Göteborgs-Posten summarized the controversial potential of Dirty Diaries as "a Kinder Egg from hell, specially designed to provoke Christian Democrat columnists. Three nightmares in one: porn and gay sex paid for with tax money".

The unusual circumstance of government-sponsored pornography also led to the topic being the butt of a parody by US talk show host Conan O'Brien.

=== Critical response ===
Critical reception of the films themselves were mixed. Hynek Pallas of Stockholm-based Svenska Dagbladet praised the shorts as "amusing, provoking and exciting", especially the opening short Skin". Lars Böhlin of Västerbottens Folkblad described it as "dull, ugly and rather artistic" and criticized its being filmed with mobile phone cameras in an age of large television screens. Böhlin also noted his negative reactions to the portrayal of a man being lured into having sex in front of a camera in Body contact and expressed sympathies for the people exposed to the advances of Johanna Rytel in Flasher girl on tour. Some of the films, like Dildoman and Skin, were considered to be of good quality, but Böhlin was doubtful whether they should be considered to be pornographic at all. Camilla Carnmo, writing for Smålandsposten was more positive, commenting that it was "good-looking and professional" despite being filmed only with phone cameras, but also added that it was "more art than porn", even if it fulfilled the technical criteria for traditional pornography. Unlike Böhlin, Carnmo praised Flasher Girl on tour for "combining humor, sex and politics in a liberating way". The soundtrack provided by Fever Ray was described as appropriate, though repetitive.
