= Solomamma =

2025 drama film by Janicke Askevold

- Directed by: Janicke Askevold
- Written by: Janicke Askevold; Jørgen Færøy Flasnes; Mads Stegger
- Produced by: Rebekka Rognøy; Gary Cranner
- Starring: Lisa Loven Kongsli; Herbert Nordrum
- Cinematography: Torjus Thesen
- Edited by: Patrick Larsgaard
- Production company: Bacon Pictures
- Release date: 11 August 2025 (Locarno)
- Running time: 99 minutes
- Countries: Norway; Latvia; Lithuania; Denmark; Finland
- Language: Norwegian

Solomamma (lit. trans. Single Mother) is a 2025 Norwegian-Latvian-Lithuanian-Danish-Finnish drama film directed by Janicke Askevold from a screenplay she wrote with Jørgen Færøy Flasnes and Mads Stegger. It is a co-production between Norway, Latvia, Lithuania, Denmark, and Finland.

It had its world premiere at the 78th Locarno Film Festival on 11 August 2025, competing for the Golden Leopard.

== Premise ==
A woman tracks down her sperm donor as she navigates the challenges of single parenthood.

== Cast ==
- Lisa Loven Kongsli as Edith
- Herbert Nordrum as Niels
- Céline Engbrightsen
- Rolf Kristian Larsen
- Nasrin Khusrawi
- Kaveh Tehrani

== Production ==
In December 2024, it won 22D Music Award during the Les Arcs Industry Village and received $10,500 grant to help finance an original score. The project participated at the Nordic Film Market, held during the Gothenburg Film Festival in January 2025. It also participated at the Meeting Point Vilnius, held during the Vilnius International Film Festival in March 2025. Between 2022 and 2025, the film received approximately NOK 7.65 million in funding from the Norwegian Film Institute.

Principal photography began in Oslo in September 2024 and wrapped up in mid-October.

== Release ==
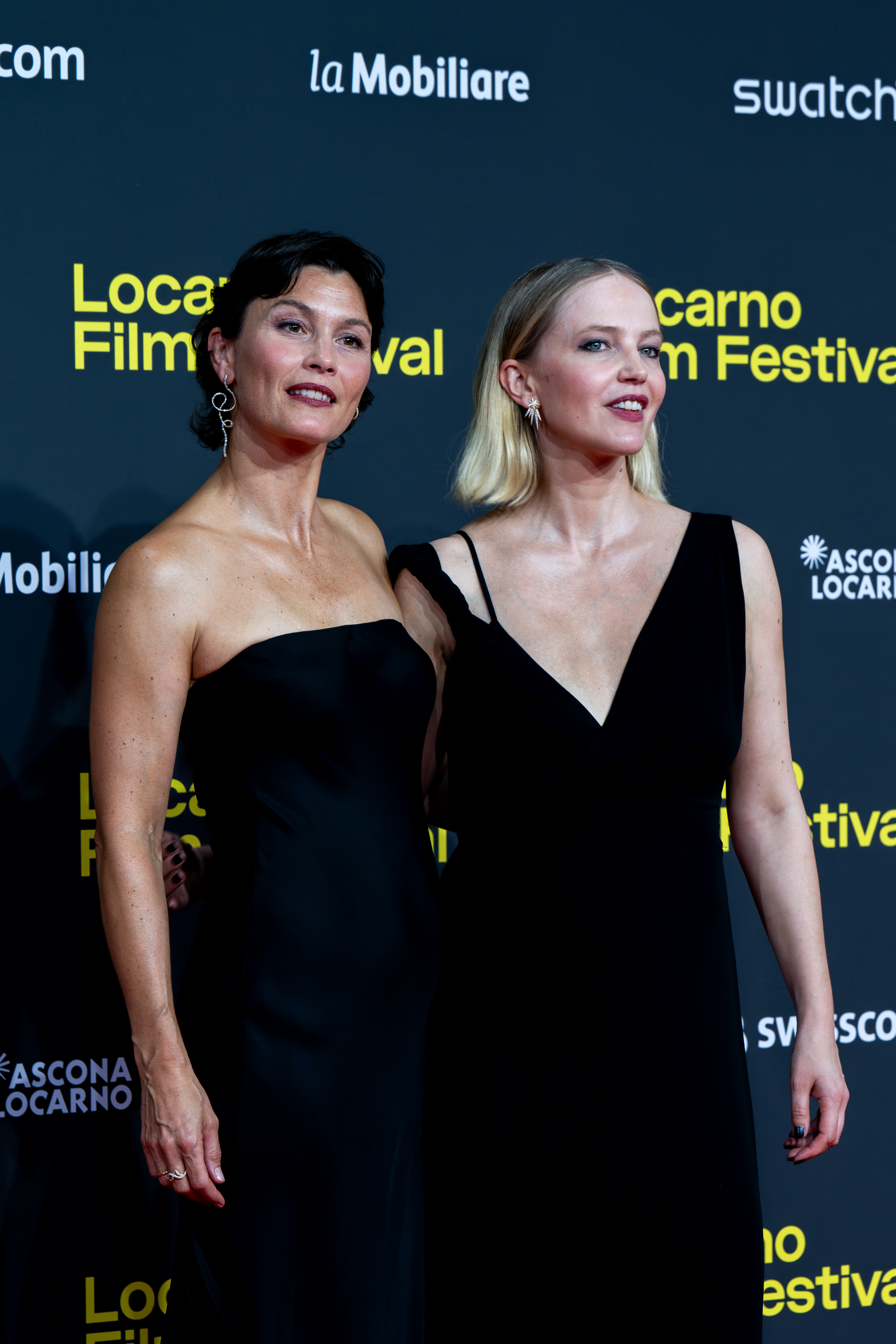
Lisa Loven Kongsli and Janicke Askevold attend the red carpet for Solomamma, Locarno Film Festival, Switzerland, 12 August 2025

Solomamma had its world premiere at the 78th Locarno Film Festival on 11 August 2025 at the Concorso Internazionale section, competing for the Golden Leopard. Prior to the premiere, Playtime acquired the film's international sales, excluding Latvia and Lithuania.

It is set to be theatrically released in Norway in February 2026.

== Awards ==
It was the winner of the Eurimages Audentia Award, a prize for films by emerging filmmakers, at the Cork International Film Festival in 2025.
