= China Salesman =

- Film poster
- Directed by: Tan Bing
- Written by: Tan Bing; Scott Salter
- Produced by: Haicheng Zhao; Zhifu Liu
- Starring: Li Dongxue; Mike Tyson; Janicke Askevold; Li Ai; Eriq Ebouaney; Clovis Fouin; Steven Seagal; Zijian Wang
- Production companies: Golden God Video & Culture; China Film Group Corporation; Wanda Pictures
- Distributed by: TriCoast Worldwide; Scotty Gelt Films
- Release date: 16 June 2017 (China)
- Running time: 110 minutes
- Country: China
- Languages: English; Chinese
- Budget: US$20 million
- Box office: US$1.5 million

China Salesman (Chinese: 中国推销员), also known as Deadly Contract and Tribal Warfare, is a 2017 Chinese action film co-written and directed by Tan Bing. The film stars Li Dongxue and features Mike Tyson and Steven Seagal in supporting roles. It was released in China on 16 June 2017.

== Plot ==
Yan Jian, a young Chinese IT engineer, volunteers to go to North Africa and help the company he works for to win a competition. The winner can own the right to control the communication between the South and North. French spy Michael is ordered to go to North Africa and win the competition, so that France can control the mineral resources of Africa. He hires the best mercenary in Africa, Lauder, and a former general, Kabbah, to help him. Yan discovers their conspiracy, and is the only one who can stop them.

== Cast ==
- Li Dongxue as Yan Jian
- Mike Tyson as Kabbah
- Janicke Askevold as Susanna
- Li Ai as Ruan Ling
- Eriq Ebouaney as Sheik Asaid
- Clovis Fouin as Michael
- Steven Seagal as Lauder
- Zijian Wang as Zheng Ming
- Anthony Gavard as ONU Officer

== Reception ==
On review aggregator website Rotten Tomatoes, the film had an approval rating of 13% based on 16 reviews, and an average rating of 2.2/10. On Metacritic, the film had a weighted average score of 14 out of 100, based on 6 critics, indicating "overwhelming dislike".
