= Roland Schütt =

Swedish author (1913–2005)

Fritiof Roland Schütt (born 18 April 1913 in Stockholm, dead 10 November 2005 (aged 92) in Tyresö) was a Swedish author. He was son to Fritiof and Zipa Schütt and younger brother to the author Bertil Schütt. He hosted Tyresö närradio together with Åke Sandin.

His novel The Slingshot was made into a 1993 film of the same name.

== Selected bibliography ==
- Brakskiten (1992)
- Kådisbellan (1989)
