= 29th Guldbagge Awards =

Annual Swedish film awards ceremony

- Date: 31 January 1994
- Site: Cirkus, Stockholm, Sweden

Highlights
- Best Picture: The Slingshot
- Most awards: The Ferris Wheel (2)
- Most nominations: The Slingshot (5)

The 29th Guldbagge Awards ceremony, presented by the Swedish Film Institute, honored the best Swedish films of 1993, and took place on 31 January 1994. The Slingshot directed by Åke Sandgren was presented with the award for Best Film.

== Winner and nominees ==
=== Awards ===
Winners are listed first and highlighted in boldface.

| **Best Film**: **The Slingshot**; The Man on the Balcony; The Ferris Wheel | **Best Director**: **Clas Lindberg – The Ferris Wheel**; Daniel Alfredson – The Man on the Balcony; Åke Sandgren – The Slingshot |
| **Best Actress in a leading role**: **Helena Bergström – The Ferris Wheel and Sista dansen**; Basia Frydman – The Slingshot; Marika Lagercrantz – Dreaming of Rita and Grandpa's Journey | **Best Actor in a leading role**: **Sven Lindberg – Spring of Joy**; Peter Haber – Sune's Summer; Simon Norrthon – Speak Up! It's So Dark |
| **Best Screenplay**: **Daniel Alfredson and Jonas Cornell – The Man on the Balcony**; Niklas Rådström – Speak Up! It's So Dark; Åke Sandgren – The Slingshot | **Best Cinematography**: **Jens Fischer – Sista dansen**; Göran Nilsson – The Slingshot; Peter Mokrosinski – The Man on the Balcony |
| **Best Foreign Film**: **The Piano (New Zealand)**; Three Colors: Blue (France); Orlando (United Kingdom) | **Creative Achievement**: **Anette Lykke Lundberg**; **Arne Sucksdorff**; **Bengt Schöldström** |
**The Ingmar Bergman Award**: **Jannike Åhlund**
