= Grandpa's Journey =

1993 film

- Directed by: Staffan Lamm
- Written by: Lars Forssell; Staffan Lamm
- Starring: Max von Sydow
- Cinematography: Esa Vuorinen
- Release date: 29 January 1993
- Running time: 82 minutes
- Country: Sweden
- Language: Swedish

Grandpa's Journey (Swedish: Morfars resa) is a 1993 Swedish drama film directed by Staffan Lamm. Marika Lagercrantz was nominated for the award for Best Actress at the 29th Guldbagge Awards.

== Cast ==
- Max von Sydow as Simon S.L. Fromm
- Mai Zetterling as Elin Fromm
- Marika Lagercrantz as Karin
- Carl Svensson as Göran
- Ina-Miriam Rosenbaum as Vera
- Sharon Brauner as Sara
- Hagen Müller-Stahl as Dr. Bratt
- Bernhard-Heinrich Herzog as Student (as Bernhard Heinrich Herzog)
- Svante Weyler as Post-office Employee
- Annmari Kastrup as Astrid
