= Something Must Break =

Swedish drama film

- Directed by: Ester Martin Bergsmark
- Written by: Eli Levén
- Starring: Saga Becker
- Cinematography: Lisabi Fridell; Minka Jakerson
- Release date: 24 January 2014 (GIFF)
- Running time: 1h 25min
- Country: Sweden
- Language: Swedish

Something Must Break (Swedish: Nånting måste gå sönder) is a 2014 Swedish drama film directed by Ester Martin Bergsmark. It is based on the novel You Are the Roots That Sleep at My Feet and Keep the Earth in Place by Eli Levén. Something Must Break tells the story of Sebastian (later, Ellie), a young, suicidal transfeminine person who first seeks joy through external validation — sex, love and romance —, before discovering their true identity and finding joy within themself. Saga Becker won the Guldbagge Award for Best Actress in a Leading Role for her performance as Sebastian/Ellie.

== Cast ==
- Saga Becker - Sebastian/Ellie
- Iggy Malmborg - Andreas
- Shima Niavarani - Lea
- Mattias Åhlén - Mattias

== Summary ==
Sebastian is a young transfeminine person from Stockholm, Sweden. They dress in bright pink jackets, wear pearl necklaces, and have long, luscious hair. Sebastian's femininity is undeniable and inevitable, but they struggle to find happiness as their current self — as Sebastian. Sebastian believes, however, that they'll find joy through love, or at least a good fuck.

Hungry for connection, Sebastian approaches a man in a public washroom. The man shoves Sebastian to the ground and begins to beat them. Another man, who later introduces himself as Andreas, comes to Sebastian's defense. Noticing Andreas’ nose is bleeding, Sebastian hands him a tissue. Andreas cleans up, throws the tissue to the ground, and continues on with his day. Sebastian picks up the bloody tissue, and brings it home with them.

Ever since their first encounter, Sebastian is completely magnetized to Andreas. Their paths unexpectedly cross again at a party in a park. They first lock eyes while Andreas is urinating. Andreas politely nods, acknowledging Sebastian, but Sebastian needs more. They follow Andreas throughout the night. When Sebastian finally closes the distance, they exchange names and, from that moment on, embark on adventures together. They explore empty construction sites, dance on rooftops, and steal liquor from convenience stores and rich older men.

At Andreas’ apartment, after one of their adventures in which they laid in a field together, Andreas insists that they check each other for ticks. They undress and examine each other's bodies. With Andreas, naked, lying in front of them, Sebastian is overcome by their lust and passion. Their actions become sexual. They caress and kiss Andreas’ skin, and eventually finger Andreas until climax.

In their next adventure together, Sebastian and Andreas kiss for the first time. The morning after, Andreas wakes up in Sebastian's bed. Sebastian is making breakfast, ready to spend another day with their dream man. Andreas insists on leaving, though. He's confused; he's unequivocally attracted to Sebastian, but he's also not gay. To that, Sebastian replies, “Me neither.” Sebastian's already ambiguous identity blurs even more.

Andreas’ absence fuels Sebastian's desire. Sebastian watches videos on their phone of Andreas sleeping, they lay their head beside the muddy footprints that Andreas left behind, and cover their face with the blood-stained tissue. But that's not enough. Sebastian stalks Andreas, following him to a restaurant where Andreas is meeting some friends. Sebastian approaches their table and is welcomed by the group. Andreas, however, is uncomfortable, and excuses himself to the washroom. Sebastian follows. Alone in the washroom, Sebastian confesses to Andreas that they belong together. They are interrupted by Andreas’ friend, Mattias. Andreas exits, leaving Mattias and Sebastian alone. Mattias seemingly compliments Sebastian. But behind his kind words, Sebastian perceives a homophobic and transphobic threat. Unsettled, Sebastian bursts out of the washroom and swiftly leaves.

In the midst of their complicated love affair with straight-identifying Andreas, Sebastian increasingly aligns with a more feminine identity, and takes on the name Ellie.

One night, Andreas returns to Ellie. They reignite their sexual and romantic relationship. Laying in bed, they fantasize about their dream life together. Ellie admits that in this new life, they will need to change their name, from Sebastian to Ellie.

Later, Andreas invites Ellie to a party at Mattias’ brother's place. Ellie is apprehensive, reminded of Mattias’ threatening remarks. Andreas reassures them that it will be okay, so long as they go “easy on the girlie stuff.” This comment shocks, hurts, and confuses Ellie. Andreas apologizes and begs Ellie to stay. But Ellie now understands that Andreas has no place in their future, and must move forward without him.

Unexpectedly and despite splitting with Andreas, Ellie attends the party. They are adorned in full feminine attire and makeup. They go to the bathroom to touch up their lip gloss and when they emerge, Andreas is singing karaoke and dancing up on Mattias. Ellie smashes a beer bottle over Mattias’ head and storms out. Andreas runs after them. Ellie explains to Andreas that when they first met, they wanted to die, but now, they see a life ahead for themself. They kiss one last time, and Ellie walks away in power, heading forward into a new chapter of their life.

== Discussion on Filth ==
Ester Bergsmark's Something Must Break distinguishes itself from other romance films in how it not just includes but reclaims and reappropriates the element of filth. Imagery of pollution, toxicity, contamination, and bodily fluids are omnipresent throughout the film. The aestheticized abject imagery creates “a cinematic world [characterized] as uniquely reflective of trans embodiment”. Something Must Break explores in filth the potential of a uniquely trans world-making, one that does not seek to conform or assimilate to what is considered pure and natural by cisheteronormative standards, but one that redefines the terms altogether, and in which the “impure” becomes a space of vulnerability, transformation and intimacy.

The representation of filth in the film can be divided into two categories: contaminated environment and contaminated body.

=== Contaminated Environment ===
Something Must Break positions trans bodies in contaminated environments — polluted ponds, garbage dumps, and bathrooms. These spaces are marginalized, on the periphery of society, hidden from sight to “remove the threat of toxic contamination,” ultimately creating the illusion that society can be cleansed of its waste. These contaminated environments are parallel to the trans body. The trans body is equally marginalized, decentralized, and is a threat of “contamination” to the dominant society. Moreover, the common narrative of the transgender experience often focuses on a beginning and an end — a before and after, where “after” is assimilation into the cisheteronormative society. Similarly to the contaminated environment, there is the illusion that society can be cleansed of the contaminated trans body, in this case through assimilation.

However, in Something Must Break, Bergsmark challenges these narratives by displacing the centre and the periphery. They propose a vantage point from which “new images and stories can emerge,” one that centralizes marginalized bodies in marginalized spaces. No longer an anomaly to be examined in reference to the cisgender body, the trans body can flourish. The trans body becomes its own, whole being, and trans itself becomes “the process through which beingness and thingness are constituted [...] [ — ] the with, through, of, in, and across that make life possible”. Therefore, the contaminated environment becomes a “[site] of creation and possibility” for the trans body.

Furthermore, in Something Must Break, it is in the contaminated environment that “the ‘unnaturalness’ of the gender non-conforming body and Sebastian and Andreas's confused relationship finds shelter”. Near the beginning of the film, Sebastian/Ellie's voice-under echoes this sentiment: “In the darkness, amongst the shadows, is where I am free. Is where I can breathe” (0:05:21). In the marginalized, peripheral spaces, Sebastian/Ellie finds refuge from the codes, norms, and structures of the dominant society. Similarly, in these spaces, Sebastian/Ellie and Andreas can explore unimpeded intimacy. For example, the couple ventures into a forest and bathes naked in a secluded pond. They playfully splash each other until coming together for a passionate kiss. Unlike other romance films with similar scenes, in Something Must Break, Sebastian/Ellie and Andreas’ enchanted oasis is a polluted pond, with litter scattered among the landscape and a concrete sewer conduit in the background. In this way, the trans body, submerged in the contaminated environment, “offers itself to the idea of pollution as a space of world-making, to an intimacy with and among other Others,” and the contaminated environment “becomes a space of intimate, vibrant entanglements. [...] A space of connection with otherness, of proximity to other discarded beings and things”.

=== Contaminated Body ===
The contaminated body is foremost represented by the trans body, itself “framed as a threat to cisheteronormative future generations via genetic contamination”. In the history of the Western world, the trans body has been medicalized and pathologized, viewed as deviant, perverted, contaminated, and mentally ill. Researcher Wibke Straube, referencing the story of Leslie Feinberg — a trans activist and historian who suffered from Lyme disease for over three decades, but who did not receive proper treatment until the last few years of their life —, attributes to the trans body the notion of the unloved Other: “ the one that seems disposable, possibly even killable”. In Something Must Break, the portrayal of the unloved Other, the trans body, subverts its very definition. Sebastian/Ellie is entirely non-disposable, given that their character is the central point of the film. Moreover, Sebastian/Ellie's contaminated body and the pleasure it receives are repeatedly shown in their full expression, and are also at the origin of queer connection. Most notably, in the scene leading up to Sebastian/Ellie and Andreas’ first sexual encounter, Andreas suggests they check each other for ticks. Andreas explores Sebastian/Ellie's naked body, including their genitals, with genuine curiosity. Both the trans body and the tick, itself a contaminated body and unloved Other, become catalysts for “queer intimacy, and new ways of being in the world”.

Something Must Break further represents the contaminated body through the aestheticization of bodily fluids. Bodily fluids — waste, contaminants that are released from the body — are often portrayed in the film in the context of sex. Particularly, in the back room of a sex club, Sebastian/Ellie is shown among two other men enjoying kinky sex, including piss play. This highly stylized scene reminds the viewer of religious imagery and Renaissance paintings. In doing so, Something Must Break subverts the Western society's conception of purity (religion) through the sanctification and beautification of the abject. Bodily fluids and the contaminated body transform into new images of beauty and pleasure.

Furthermore, in Something Must Break, there is a constant association between bodily fluids and intimacy. In a voice-under, Sebastian/Ellie states, “Spit at me. Hit me. Piss in my mouth if it'll make you love me” (0:06:47). In a similar way, bodily fluids play a critical role in the development of Sebastian/Ellie and Andreas’ relationship: Andreas’ blood is the first souvenir Sebastian/Ellie keeps of their relationship… They next meet while urinating… Andreas’ vomit prompts Sebastian/Ellie to introduce themself… Engaging in knife play, Andreas’ blood is the result of sexual excitement, exploration, and desire… Therefore, bodily fluids, in this context, “embody an opening-up, a vulnerability, a becoming that molds new forms of relationships, new forms of love”.
