= Åke Sandgren =

Swedish-Danish film director and screenwriter

- Born: 13 May 1955 (age 71); Umeå, Sweden
- Occupations: Film director, screenwriter, film producer
- Years active: 1983–present
- Partner: Annette K Olesen
- Children: 3

Åke Sandgren (born 13 May 1955) is a Swedish-Danish film director and screenwriter. He has written and directed a number of films in a variety of genres, mostly in Denmark where he now lives.

== Biography ==
Sandgren studied Film Science and Philosophy at Stockholm University from 1976 to 1979 and then moved to Denmark where he studied film direction at the National Film School of Denmark from 1979 to 1982. After graduation, he worked as a writer and director of films in both Sweden and Denmark.

He won the Golden Bear award for Best Short Film at the 1984 Berlin International Film Festival with his film Cykelsymfonien (The Bicycle Symphony). His 1989 film Miraklet i Valby (Miracle at Valby) won the Grand Prize at the 2nd Yubari International Fantastic Film Festival held in February 1991. It also won the awards for Best Film, Best Director and Best Screenplay at the 25th Guldbagge Awards. He was nominated again for the Guldbagge Award for Best Director in 1993 for the film The Slingshot.

He has collaborated with a number of other Danish film directors including Søren Kragh-Jacobsen, Stig Håkan Larsson, and Lars von Trier.

== Filmography ==
Work	Year	Credit	Notes
The Shooter (2013 film)	2013	Screenplay	Feature
Headhunter	2009	Producer	Feature
Super Brother	2009	Screenplay	Feature
To Love Someone	2008	Direction	Feature
Awakening	2008	Script consultant	Short fiction
Accused	2005	Associate producer	Feature
The Big Day	2005	Associate producer	Feature
Flies on the Wall	2005	Direction	Feature
The Babylon Disease	2004	Producer	Feature
Move Me!	2003	Producer	Feature
Reconstruction	2003	Producer	Feature
Truly Human	2001	Direction	Feature
Beyond (2000 film)	2000	Direction	Feature
Big Men, Little Men	1995	Direction	Feature
The Slingshot	1993	Direction	Feature
Miracle in Valby	1989	Direction	Feature
Emma's Shadow	1988	Screenplay assistance	Feature
Drengen i træet	1988	Direction	Short fiction
Peter von Scholten (film)	1987	Assistant director	Feature
The Secret of John	1985	Direction	Short fiction
The Element of Crime	1984	Assistant director	Feature
Rainfox	1984	Assistant director	Feature
Thunderbirds	1983	Assistant director	Feature
Haiti Express	1983	Assistant director	Feature
Cykelsymfonien	1983	Direction	Short fiction
Rubber Tarzan	1981	Assistant director	Feature
