= Marika Lagercrantz =

Swedish actress

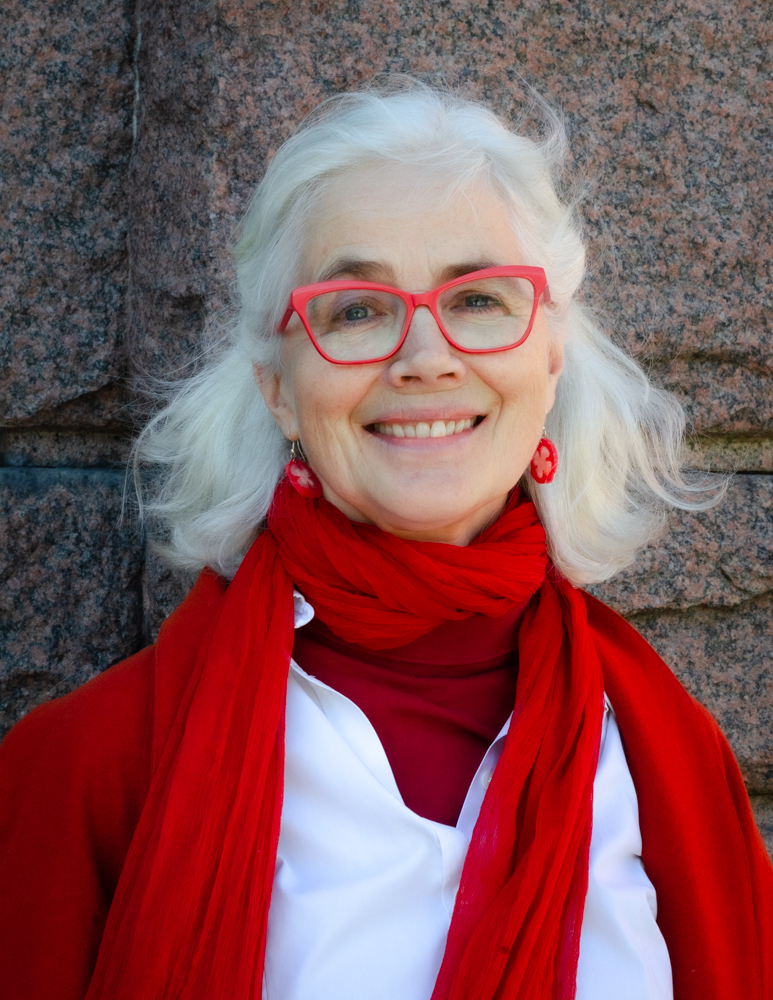
- Lagercrantz in 2021.
- Born: Marika Karen Louise Lagercrantz; 12 July 1954 (age 71); Solna, Sweden
- Occupation: Actress
- Years active: 1967–present
- Spouse(s): Chris Torch (divorced); Peter Bergared
- Children: 1
- Parent(s): Olof Lagercrantz; Martina Ruin
- Relatives: David Lagercrantz (brother); Hans Ruin (grandfather)

Marika Karin Louise Lagercrantz (born 12 July 1954) is a Swedish actress. Between 2011 and 2014, she was Sweden's cultural attaché at the Berlin embassy in Germany.

Lagercrantz was born in Solna. She is the daughter of Olof Lagercrantz, granddaughter of Hans Ruin, sister of David Lagercrantz, and cousin of Lars and Johan Lönnroth. Lagercrantz got her start in acting at Vår teater, a Swedish children's theatre, at six years of age. She participated in season 10 of Stjärnorna på slottet which was broadcast on SVT.

== Filmography ==
Year	Title	Role	Notes
1993	Grandpa's Journey		Nominated for Best Actress at the 29th Guldbagge Awards
1993	Dreaming of Rita		Nominated for Best Actress at the 29th Guldbagge Awards
1995	All Things Fair	Viola	Best Actress
2000	Gossip	Karin Kalters	
2009	The Girl with the Dragon Tattoo	Cecilia Vanger	

=== Television ===
- Rapport till himlen (1994)
- Emma Åklagare(1997)
- Längtans Blåa Blomma (1998)
- Folk med ångest (2021)
