= Jewish Theatre, Stockholm =

Cultural center in Stockholm, Sweden

Coordinates: 59°19′48″N 18°8′0″E

The Jewish Theatre
- Judiska teatern
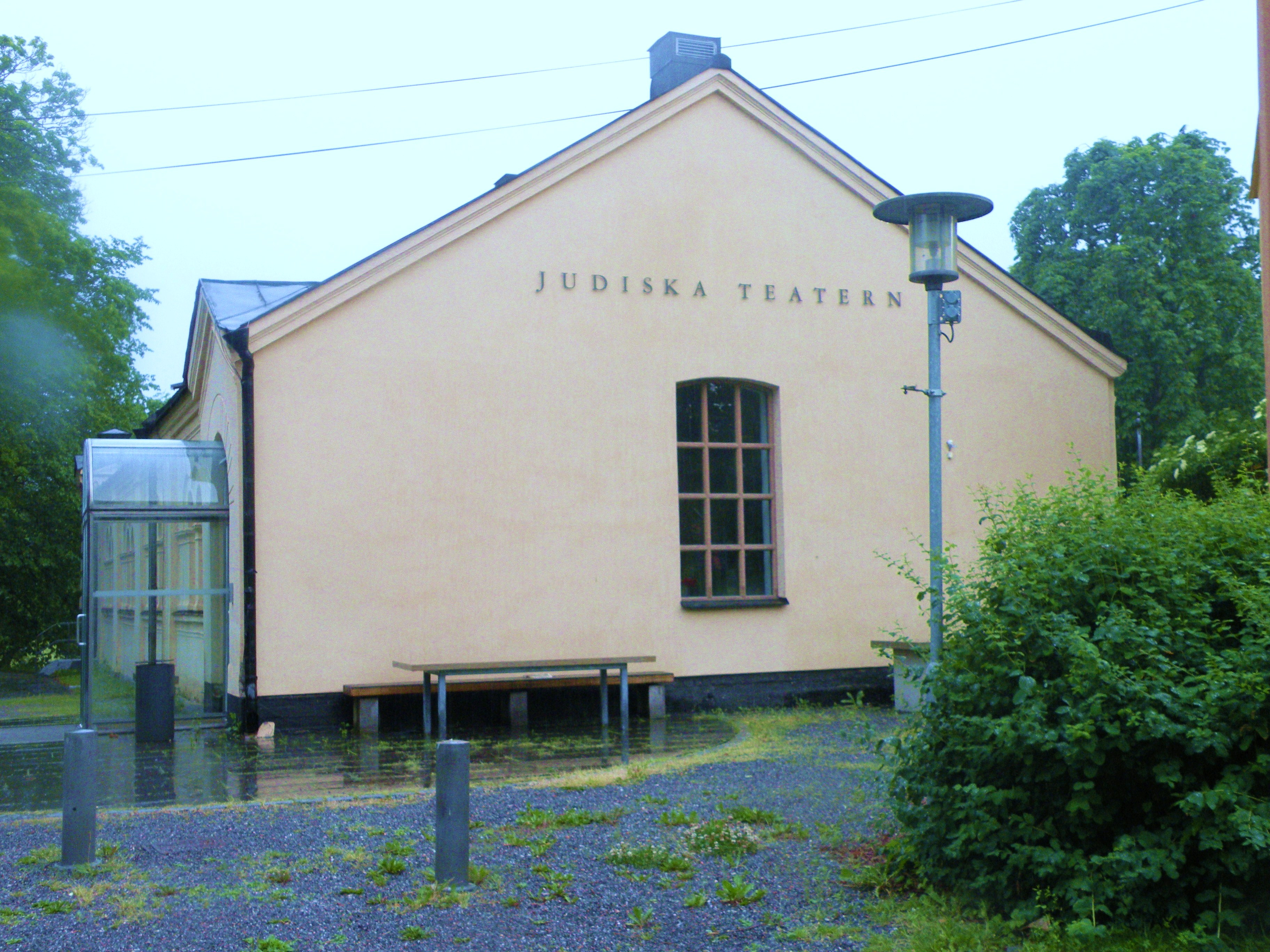
- The building formerly known as Stora Kägelbanan and the Jewish Theatre at Djurgårdsbrunn
- Interactive map of The Jewish Theatre
- Address: Djurgårdsbrunnsvägen 59; Stockholm; Sweden
- Type: Theatre

Construction
- Opened: 1995
- Closed: 2013

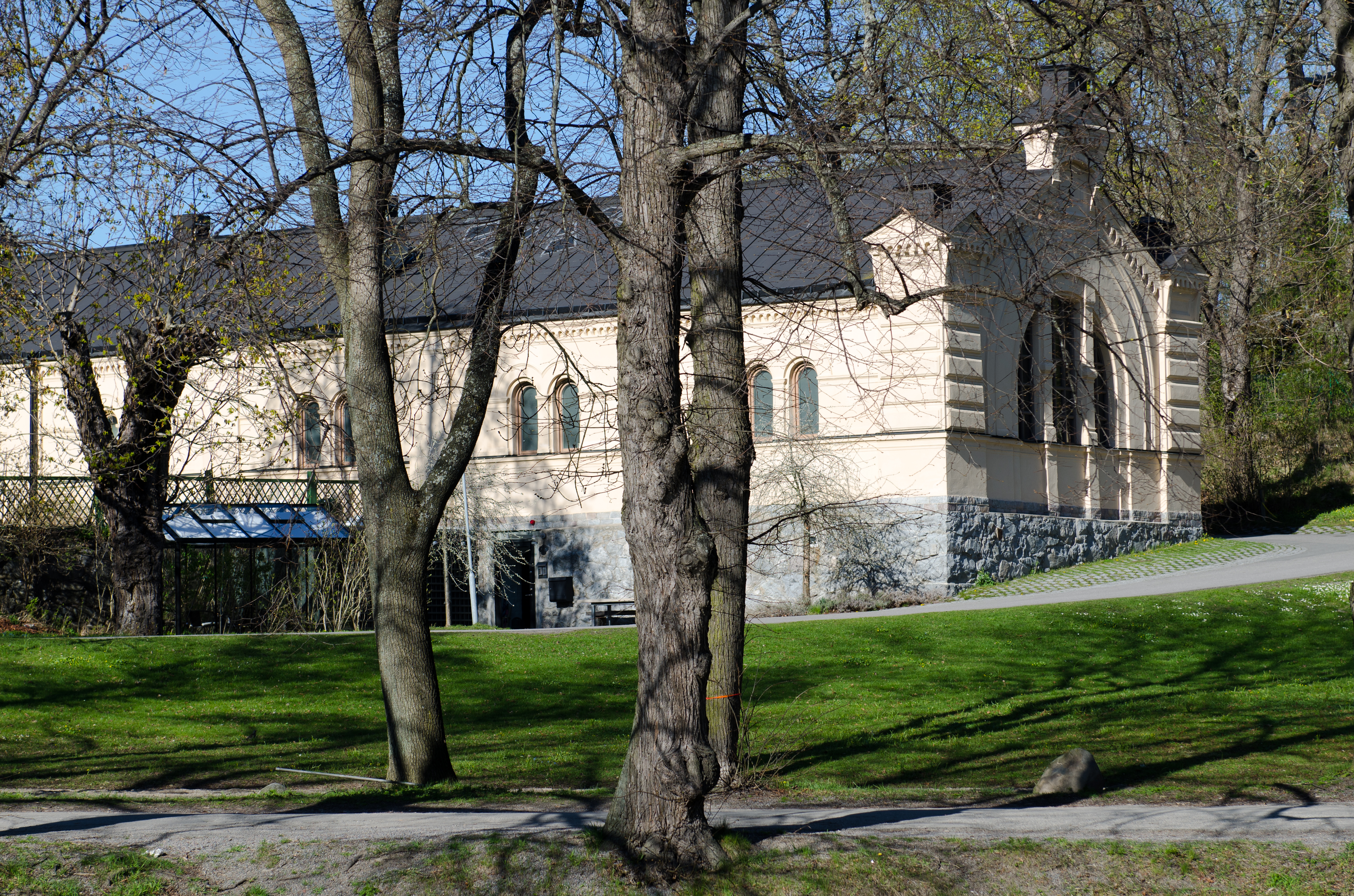
The building from the south.

The Jewish Theatre (Swedish: Judiska teatern) was a privately owned Swedish theatre and an experimental scenic cultural center on Jewish cultural grounds in Stockholm, Sweden.

== History ==
During the 20th century, there has been a few standalone Jewish theatre ensembles and productions accruing in Stockholm. Between 1995 and 2015 a Jewish cultural theatre place was created, when the Judiska teatern started its activity with productions, especially with cooperation with Dramaten, Riksteatern och Radioteatern. The theatre has been located in its own building in a modernized skittle alley from the 1880s by Djurgårdsbrunnsvägen 59 at Djurgården, however since 2013 the theatre is closed with a possible future in a different form. The organization was driven and financed mainly by the financier Robert Weil and his company Proventus since 1997 and with director Pia Forsgren as artistic director. The company was not limited to only Jewish authors or cooperators, but had a Jewish-culturual perspective on productions, such as Stilla vatten by Lars Norén, Aska by Harold Pinter, Försoningsdagen by Marianne Goldman, Kristallvägen by Katarina Frostenson, Savannah Bay by Marguerite Duras, and many successful directors, actors, musicians, et al. that have participated over the years.

The company was not limited to traditional theatre, but often has an experimental approach, was not limited to tradicional theatre, but had an experimental approach, and all productions within, as dance, music, fiilm, poetry and exhibitions, as the noticed Flykt och förvandling - Nelly Sachs, författare, Berlin/Stockholm (2010) about the exiled nobelpristagaren Nelly Sachs. In connection with this, also the youth literature prize Lilla Nelly Sachspriset (after the German role model Nelly Sachs Pris) related to the theatre.The first prize 2010 went to 17-åriga Greta Maria Asgeirsdottir. The Prize has supposedly not been handed out again.

The Jewish Theatre (Judiska teatern) was from 2004 also of the dividends of the Swedish Cikada-priset to the memory of poet Harry Martinson.

== Remarkable performances ==
- 1997 - About Night Reads The Stars - Basia Frydman and Tana Ross.
- 1999 - Ashes To Ashes
- 2002 - Crystal Roads
- 2003 - About Spoonface Steinberg
- 2004 - We're Not Falling
- 2006 - About Shadowtime
- 2006 - FURO (reopened in Tel Aviv in 2008)
