= The Slingshot (film) =

1993 Swedish film directed by Åke Sandgren

- Theatrical release poster
- Directed by: Åke Sandgren
- Written by: Åke Sandgren
- Based on: Kådisbellan by Roland Schütt
- Produced by: Waldemar Bergendahl; Miro Vostiar
- Starring: Jesper Salén; Stellan Skarsgård; Basia Frydman; Frida Hallgren; Ernst-Hugo Järegård; Axel Düberg; Reine Brynolfsson
- Cinematography: Göran Nilsson
- Distributed by: Svenska Filminstitutet (Scandinavia); Sony Pictures Classics (International)
- Release date: 24 September 1993 (Sweden)
- Running time: 102 minutes
- Country: Sweden
- Language: Swedish
- Box office: $309,117 (USA)

The Slingshot (Swedish: Kådisbellan) is a Swedish drama film which was released to cinemas in Sweden on 24 September 1993, starring Jesper Salén, Stellan Skarsgård and Basia Frydman. Directed by Åke Sandgren, the film was based on Roland Schütt's 1989 autobiographical novel of the same name (translates to "The Condom Slingshot").

== Plot ==
Roland (Salén) is the 12-year-old son of a Russian Jewish mother (Frydman) and a socialist father (Skarsgård), coming of age in 1920s Stockholm. Due to his family's background he has become an outcast, a constant target of bullying by his peers, and often humiliated and physically punished by a sadistic schoolteacher (Ernst-Hugo Järegård) in front of classmates. In retaliation against his tormentors, Roland steals condoms from his mother's tobacco shop inventory and turns them into crude slingshot weapons. He also falls in love with a neighbourhood girl (Frida Hallgren) but as Roland attempts to toughen up and improve his troubled life, he also allies with the wrong group of friends and inadvertently makes himself a juvenile offender.

== Shooting ==
Most outdoor scenes were shot in Prague as the Stockholm townscape at the time was considered to have undergone too many changes to depict the 1920s.

== Cast ==
- Jesper Salén as Roland Schütt
- Stellan Skarsgård as Fritiof Schütt
- Basia Frydman as Zipa Schütt
- Niklas Olund as Bertil Schütt
- Ernst-Hugo Järegård as Teacher Lundin
- Ernst Günther as Principal
- Axel Düberg as Inspector Gissle
- Reine Brynolfsson as Hinke Berggren
- Heinz Hopf as Shoe salesman
- Frida Hallgren as Margit
- Tomas Norström as Boxing Trainer
- Ing-Marie Carlsson as Karin Adamsson
- Rolf Lassgård as Prisoner

== Reception ==
=== Critical response ===
The Slingshot has an approval rating of 89% on review aggregator website Rotten Tomatoes, based on 9 reviews, and an average rating of 6.9/10.

AllMovie critic Clarke Fountain called the film an "affectionate, richly detailed portrait", while film critic James Berardinelli gave the film three and a half out of four stars and called it "a wonderful mix of tragedy, humor, and triumph." Conversely, the Washington Post had an unfavorable view of the movie and called the story "a catalogue of catastrophes that surely left the real protagonist with many emotional scars."

=== Awards and nominations ===
At the 29th Guldbagge Awards the film won the award for Best Film. Åke Sandgren was nominated for both Best Director and Best Screenplay, while Basia Frydman was nominated for Best Actress.

The film was the Swedish submission to the 66th Academy Awards for Best Foreign Language Film, but did not make nomination.

=== Year-end lists ===
- Best "sleepers" (not ranked) – Dennis King, Tulsa World

== See also ==
- List of submissions to the 66th Academy Awards for Best Foreign Language Film
- List of Swedish submissions for the Academy Award for Best Foreign Language Film
