= Ester Martin Bergsmark =

Swedish director and screenwriter (born 1982)

- Born: 1982 (age 43–44); Stockholm, Sweden
- Occupations: Film director; screenwriter

Ester Martin Bergsmark (born 1982) is a Swedish movie director and screenwriter of the documentaries Maggie in Wonderland and She Male Snails. Bergsmark's first fiction feature Something Must Break (2014) has won ten awards, including the Tiger Award, 43rd Rotterdam International Film Festival, the Grand Jury Award in Outfest Los Angeles LGBT Film Festival or Best Film and Best Performance for Saga Becker in the Lisbon International Queer Film Festival.

== Biography ==
Bergsmark was born in 1982, in Stockholm, Sweden. They studied documentary filmmaking at Biskops Arnö Nordens Folkhögskola and were also trained at the Swedish University College of Arts Crafts and Design. Together with Swedish director Mark Hammarberg, Bergsmark directed the short film Svälj (2006) and the documentary Maggie in Wonderland (Swedish: Maggie Vaknar på Balkongen) (2008). In Maggie in Wonderland they worked together with Maggie Beatrice "Maggie" Andersson and also participated in Svälj. Maggie in Wonderland was rewarded with a Guldbagge Award for best documentary the same year as it was released.

In 2009, Bergsmark took part in a feminist project in which several directors and artists directed twelve short movies for a collection called Dirty Diaries. The collection was made with the aim of rethinking pornography; Bergsmark's segment is called Fruitcake. 2009 was also the year in which Bergsmark got the legal right to change their first name to Ester. Before it had not been possible as the previous name law in Sweden had denied people from adding or changing their name to one from another legal gender.

Bergsmark received another Guldbagge Award nomination for best documentary 2012 for the movie She Male Snails. The movie was made in collaboration with Swedish author Eli Levén. Bergsmark and Levén had previously been in a relationship that ended a couple of months before the filming of She Male Snails begun. The movie protests against the binary gender system that consists of women and men and begins with Bergsmark talking about the first time they saw Levén as a teenager and the fact that Levén dared being something beyond boy or girl. In interviews Bergsmark has said that while not wanting to live as a woman they consider themself a trans person and find security in not having to have a static gender identity. The movie is a mix of documentary and fiction and received financial support for feature movies.

In the fall of 2011 Bergsmark and Levén moved to Berlin and worked together in a mutual office on the manuscript to Bergsmark's film Something Must Break. The film opened the Gothenburg Film Festival 2014 and was nominated for a Dragon Award for Best Nordic picture. The movie is based on a book by Levén (Swedish title: Du är rötterna som sover vid mina fötter och håller jorden på plats). Just like She Male Snails Something Must Break deals with the topic of belonging somewhere in between what is considered being male and what is considered being female. It also circles around young love and beginning to accept yourself.

2014 Bergsmark received the Mai Zetterling-scholarship, a scholarship for movie directors working with short movies or documentaries. The scholarship was handed out at the Gothenburg Film Festival on the January 24 that year.

== Filmography ==
- 2006 – Svälj
- 2008 – Maggie in Wonderland (Original Title in Swedish: Maggie Vaknar på Balkongen
- 2009 – Dirty Diaries (Fragment: Fruitcake)
- 2012 – She Male Snails (Original Title in Swedish: Pojktanten)
- 2014 – Something Must Break (Original Title in Swedish: Nånting Måste Gå Sönder)
- 2018 – Swedish Candy, Some Violence and a Bit Of Cat

== Prizes and awards ==
- Guldbagge Award for best documentary – Maggie in Wonderland
- Tempo Documentary Festival honorable mention
- The International Film Festival of the Art of Cinematography honorable mention – Pojktanten

=== Something must break ===
- Tiger Award, 43rd Rotterdam International Film Festival
- Mai Zetterling Grant (Ester Martin Bergsmark), 37th Gothenburg Film Festival
- Frameline38 Wells Fargo First Feature Award, Frameline38 – San Francisco International LGBT Film Festival
- Grand Jury Award, International features, 2014 Outfest LA
- Best Feature Film and Best Performance (Saga Becker), Lisbon International Queer Film Festival 18
- Silver Hugo Q Award, Chicago Film Festival 2014
- Jury Prize, 25th Hamburg Queer Filmfestival
- Sunny Bunny Winner, Molodist- 45th Kyiv International Film Festival
- Best Film, 15th Mezipatra Queer Film Festival (Prague)
- Best Feature, Side by side LGBT International Film Festival (St Petersburg)
- Ocaña Award-Best LGTBI Film, Seville European Film Festival 2014
