= Janicke Askevold =

Norwegian director

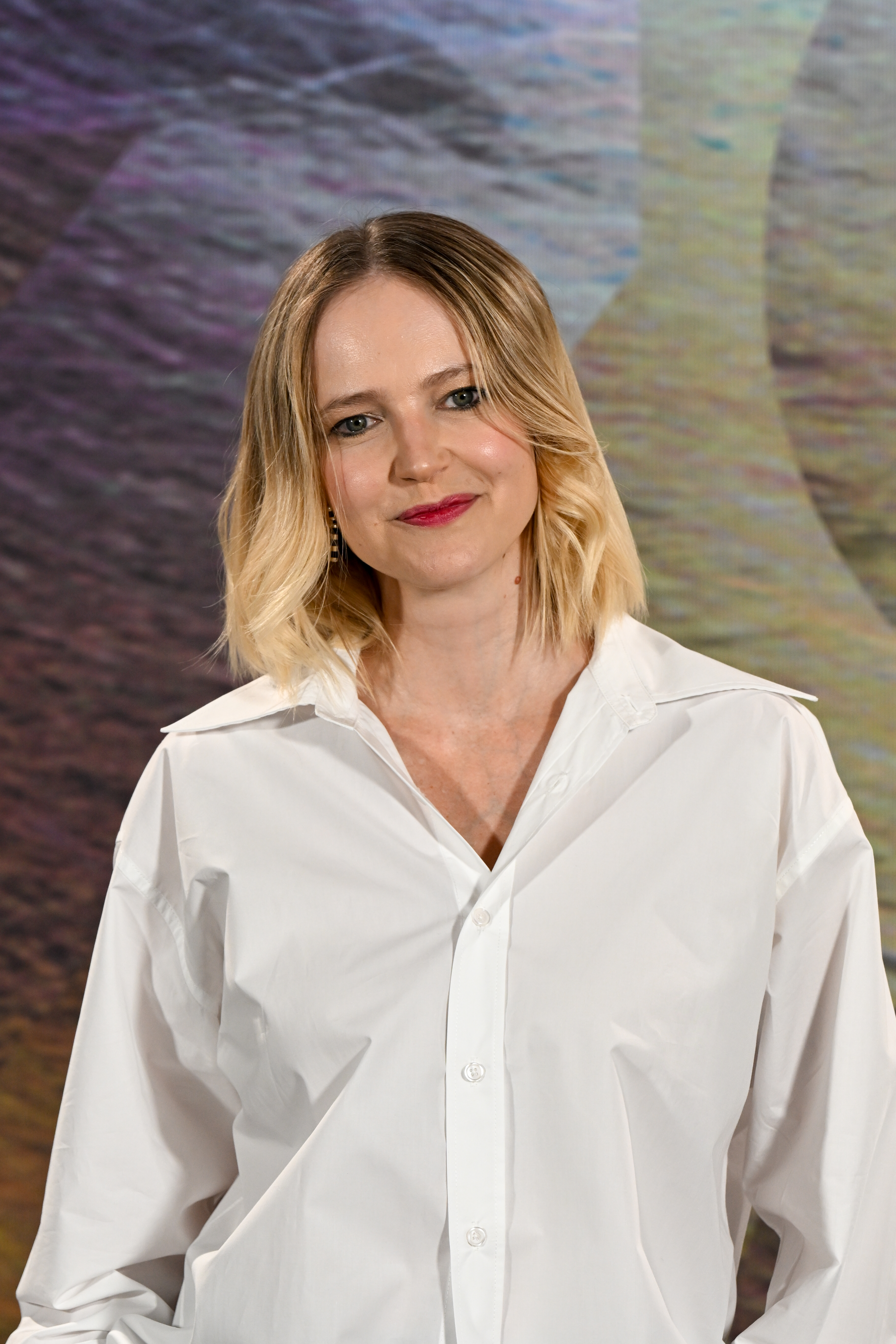
- At the Locarno Film Festival, 11 August 2025
- Born: April 29, 1980 (age 45); Stavanger, Norway
- Occupations: film director, actress, and model

Janicke Askevold (born 29 April 1980) is a Norwegian film director, actress, and model. Askevold has acted in several notable films, including China Salesman and My Way. She also directed the 2021 film Together Alone.

== Biography ==
Askevold was born in Bærum, Norway. At the age of 19, she was recruited by a modelling agency, and promptly left for Milan. Askevold had her first major acting role in 2012, when she acted as Sophia in My Way. In 2017, Askevold starred in the Chinese action film China Salesman, portraying the character Susanna.

In 2021, Janicke Askevold released her first feature-length film, Together Alone. The Norwegian Kinomagasinet rated the movie at five out of six stars, calling it a "really good Norwegian film experience, with competent actors". Stavanger Aftenblad branded it a "boring bickering film".

== Filmography ==
Films as actor

- 2009 – A Cat, a Cat by Sophie Fillières as Bélinda
- 2012 – Blood from a Stone by Jacques Maillot as top model
- 2012 – My Way by Florent-Emilio Siri as Sofia
- 2017 – China Salesman by Tan as Suzanna

Films as director

- 2021 – Together Alone
- 2025 – Solomamma, It will premiere in main competition at the 78th Locarno Film Festival.

Television (series and TV movies)

- 2017 – Love at First Sight at Christmas by Arnauld Mercadier as Anna
