= Johannes Bah Kuhnke =

Swedish actor and singer

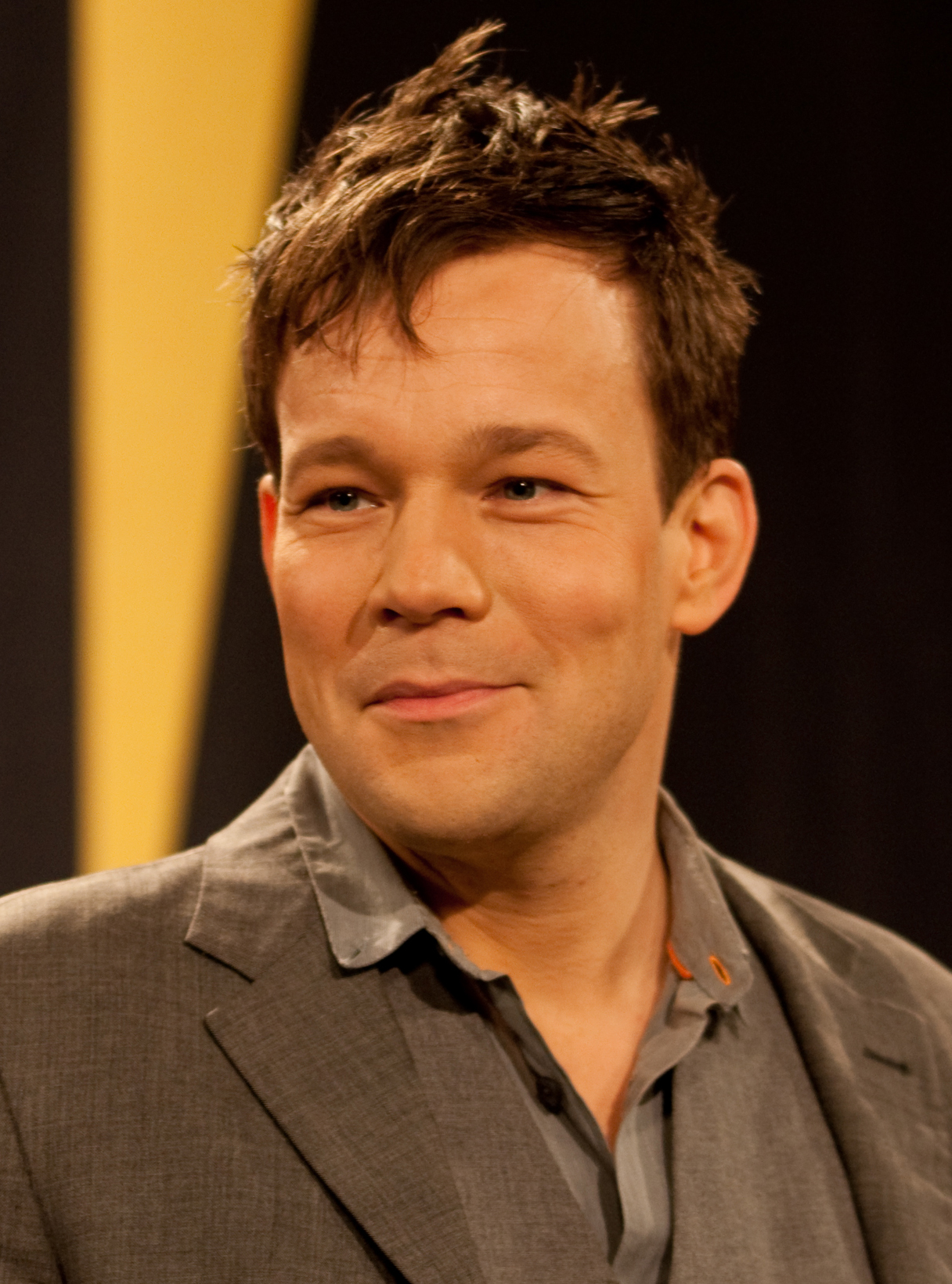
- Johannes Bah Kuhnke (2009)
- Born: Kjell Dietrich Johannes Kuhnke; 17 April 1972 (age 53); Strömsund, Sweden
- Occupations: Actor, singer
- Years active: 2001–present
- Spouse: Alice Bah (m. 2003; div. 2023)
- Children: 3

Kjell Dietrich Johannes Bah Kuhnke (né Kuhnke; born 17 April 1972) is a Swedish actor and singer. He has acted in several films and received international attention in 2014 for his role in the film Force Majeure. In 2010, he participated as a singer in Melodifestivalen with the song "Tonight". In addition to acting in films and on television, he has performed in plays such as Cabaret and The Jungle Book. He was married to Swedish politician Alice Bah Kuhnke.

== Biography ==
=== Early life ===
Johannes Bah Kuhnke was born in Strömsund and became interested in acting, and studied at a theater gymnasium in Gothenburg and then at Malmö Theatre Academy.

=== Career ===
He has acted in plays including Three Musketeers, Hedwig and the Angry Inch, Cabaret, The Jungle Book, and The Marriage of Figaro at Stockholm's Stadsteater. He has also performed plays at the Backa Teater, Göteborgs Stadsteater, Malmö Stadsteater and Teater Tribunalen. In films and television Bah Kuhnke has acted in Ella Lemhagens "Om inte", the film Ögat, Järnvägshotellet, Älskade du, Så olika, and Real Humans. In 2014 he played the leading role in the Ruben Östlund critically acclaimed film Force Majeure (sv:Turist). The film was awarded the jury's prize at the 2014 Cannes Film Festival, and was also chosen as Sweden's nominee for the Academy Award in the category Best Foreign Film. In 2014, Bah Kuhnke auditioned for the role of Jonas Hollander, Carrie Mathison's boyfriend in season five of the series Homeland. He did not win the role, instead it went to German actor Alexander Fehling.

Bah Kuhnke participated in Melodifestivalen 2010 with the song "Tonight". The song was performed in the second semi-final in Gothenburg, where it was eliminated in the first round of voting by the public. In 2016 Bah Kuhnke will have one of the leading roles in the TV3 series Black Widows acting opposite Peter Stormare and Cissi Forss.

== Personal life ==
Since 2003, Johannes Bah Kuhnke has been married to politician Alice Bah Kuhnke; the couple have three children together. The couple met after Alice went to watch the play The Portrait of Dorian Gray in Malmö in which Johannes had the leading role.

== Filmography ==
- 2001 – Om inte
- 2003 – Järnvägshotellet
- 2003 – Solbacken: Avd. E
- 2009 – Så olika
- 2011 – Bilar 2 (voice acting)
- 2012–14 – Real Humans
- 2013 – Wallander – Sorgfågeln
- 2014 – Force Majeure
- 2016 – Black Widows
- 2018 – The Rain
- 2018, 2021 – The Hunters
- 2020 – Kärlek och anarki
- 2021 – Tigrar
- 2023 – Barracuda Queens
