= Saga Becker =

Swedish actress (born 1988)

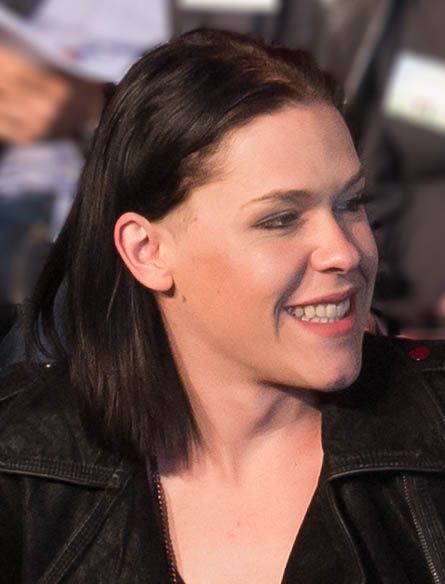
- Saga Becker in 2015
- Born: 1988 (age 37–38); Eringsboda, Sweden
- Occupation: Actress
- Years active: 2006–present
- Known for: Something Must Break (2014)

Saga Becker (born 1988) is a Swedish actress. Becker is known for her performance as Sebastian in Something Must Break (2014) for which she was nominated for a Rising Star Award at the Stockholm Film Festival in 2014 and won a Guldbagge Award for Best Female Lead Role in 2015.

== Early life ==
Becker grew up in Eringsboda, Sweden, in a wooded area outside Ronneby. Today she resides in Stockholm. Becker is the eldest child of her parents and has two younger brothers.

When discussing her experience growing up transgender, she said she knew she was different and tried to create a dream world where she saw herself as a girl falling in love with a man. In school, she was bullied and received death threats and as a result of the harassment began to drink alcohol, and both starve and cut herself.

== Career ==
She made her film debut in director Ester Martin Bergsmark's movie Something Must Break (2014) which was based on the novel You Are the Roots That Sleep at My Feet and Keep the Earth in Place by Eli Levén. In April 2014, Becker traveled to New York for the premiere showing at the Tribeca Film Festival. For her role as the character Sebastian/Ellie in the film she won a Guldbagge Award for Best Female Lead Role in 2015 and thereby became the first transgender actress both to be nominated and win a Guldbagge Award.

Becker was nominated for a Rising Star Award at the Stockholm Film Festival in 2014. In 2015 Becker became the ambassador for the organization Suicide Zero, an organization that works to prevent suicides. Becker had talked about being suicidal before her gender reassignment operation. Becker will, working with Suicide Zero, focus on transgender and gay people at risk.

Becker has demanded that the Swedish film industry give more roles to transgender actors and actresses. In March 2015, Becker became the first person to get tested for HIV at the RFSL's new testing station Testpoint in Stockholm as it had its opening day. Earlier, in February 2015, she had been a guest on the TV4 talk show Malou Efter Tio presented by Malou von Sivers.

On 3 July 2015, Becker hosted Sommar i P1, broadcast on Sveriges Radio, where she talked about her career and her life as a transgender actress and described her life experience as a transgender person by saying,

Sometimes life has edges, sharp jagged edges that can cut ... and I cut myself all the time for it is difficult to live in a world if one does not exist. To deny oneself to fit in is stressful for both the body and the psyche. Not being able to be [myself] could mean the end. I can not lie anymore. This is my truth.

== Awards ==
Year	Nominee / work	Award	Result
2014	Something Must Break	Stockholm Film Festival Rising Star Award	Nominated
2015	Something Must Break	Guldbagge Award, Best Female Lead Role	Won
