= Ossian Elgström =

Swedish writer and illustrator

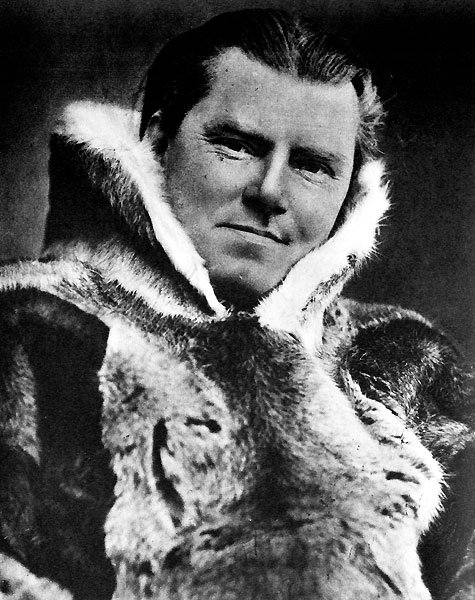
- Born: 19 November 1883; Strövelstorp, Sweden
- Died: 20 May 1950 (aged 66); Båstad
- Other names: Illustrator and writer
- Education: Royal Swedish Academy of Fine Arts
- Relatives: Anna Lenah Elgström (sister)

Josef David Ossian Elgström (19 November 1883 – 20 May 1950) was a Swedish illustrator and writer.

== Personal life ==
Born in Strövelstorp, Elgström was a brother of writer and visual artist Anna Lenah Elgström.

== Career ==
Elgström studied at the Royal Swedish Academy of Arts from 1906 to 1907, and then with Kristian Zahrtmann in 1907 and with Christian Krohg in 1908. He contributed to the magazines Strix, Söndags-Nisse and Puck. He collected folkloristic material from Siberia, Greenland and Lappland, which he used in his books. Among his books are Lapska myther (1914), Lappalaiset (1919), and Karesuando-lapparna (1922). His work was also part of the painting event in the art competition at the 1936 Summer Olympics.
