= House of Angels – Third Time Lucky =

- Film poster
- Swedish: Änglagård – tredje gången gillt
- Directed by: Colin Nutley
- Written by: Colin Nutley
- Produced by: Colin Nutley
- Cinematography: Jens Fischer
- Release date: 25 December 2010 (Sweden)
- Running time: 117 minutes
- Country: Sweden
- Language: Swedish

House of Angels – Third Time Lucky (Swedish: Änglagård – tredje gången gillt) is a Swedish film directed by Colin Nutley. It premiered on 25 December 2010 in Swedish cinemas. It is the third film of the Änglagård film trilogy.

== Cast ==
- Helena Bergström as Fanny Zander
- Reine Brynolfsson as Henning Collmer
- Molly Nutley as Alice Zander
- Jakob Eklund as Mårten Flogfält
- Sven Wollter as Axel Flogfält
- Rikard Wolff as Zac
- Jan Mybrand as Per-Ove Ågren
- Ing-Marie Carlsson as Eva Ågren
- Lena T Hansson as Mona
- Maria Lundqvist as Anki
