= 2005 Shanghai International Film Festival =

Chinese film festival

The 8th Shanghai International Film Festival was a film festival held in 2005. The president of the 8th SIFF was Wu Tianming (China).

== Jury members ==
- Wu Tianming (China)
- Jiang Wenli (China)
- Kang Je-gyu (Korea)
- Lisa Lu (USA/China)
- Marc Rothemund（Germany）
- Imanol Uribe (Spain)
- Régis Wargnier (France)

== Winners ==
=== Golden Goblet ===
- Best Feature Film: Mura no shashinshuu, The Village Photobook, by Mitsuhiro Mihara (Japan)
- Jury Grand Prix: Gimme Kudos, by Huang Jianxin (China)
- Best Director: Rumle Hammerich, Young Andersen (Denmark)
- Best Actress: Zhao Wei, A Time To Love (China)
- Best Actor: Tatsuya Fuji, The Village Album (Japan)
- Best Screenplay: Huang Xin/Yi Fan, Gimme Kudos (China)
- Best Cinematography: Stuart Dryburgh, In My Father's Den (New Zealand)
- Best Music: Dang Huu Phuc, A Time Far Past (Vietnam/France)

=== Special Jury Award ===
- Official Selection Feature: Zee-Oui, by Buranee Rachjaibun, Nida Suthat Na Ayutthaya (Thailand)

=== Asian New Talent Award ===
- Audience Award: Mongolian Ping Pong, by Hao Ning (China)
- Best Director: Hassan Yektapanah, Story Undone (Persia)

=== Press Prize ===
- Best Custom Design: Young Andersen, by Rumle Hammerich (Denmark)
- Best Feature: Qiuqiu ni, biaoyang wo, Gimme Kudos, by Huang Jianxin (China)
- Exploring Spirit Award: Qiuqiu ni, biaoyang wo, Gimme Kudos, by Huang Jianxin (China)
