= Jacob Groth =

Danish composer

- Born: 12 May 1951 (age 74); Copenhagen, Denmark
- Genres: Film scores
- Occupation: Film composer
- Years active: 1970s–present
- Website: www.jacobgroth.com

Jacob Groth (born 12 May 1951) is a Danish film composer. He is most known for scoring the film trilogy based on Stieg Larsson's Millennium series and a number of award-winning Danish TV series as well as the CBS series Unforgettable. Among his most known works are "Would Anybody Die (For Me)" from The Girl Who Played with Fire and the opening song "Forgiveness" from the DR series The Eagle, both of which have lyrics and vocals by his spouse, Misen Groth.

== Biography ==
Jacob Groth was born in Copenhagen. He began his career in music as a rock musician, playing in various bands in the 1950s and 1970s. Instigated by his childhood friend, Rumle Hammerich he began to make film music for students at the Danish Film School in the late 1970s. He also worked on Søren Kragh-Jacobsen's feature film debut Vil du se min smukke Navle? (1978) and had his professional debut as a film composer on Henning Kristiansen's drama Charly & Steffen (1979).

The initial acquaintance with Kragh-Jacobsen led to a decades-long collaboration on films such as The Boys from St. Petri (1991) and Skagerrak (2003), while his children's film laburnum first time in 1989 to Robert, the price of the Danish Film Academy earned. Groth's score for Kragh-Jacobseb's TV series Guldregn won him his first Danish Film Academy Award for Best Film Score in 1090. Since the early 1980s, Groth also collaborated with Rumle Hammerich on several films, including Otto is a Rhino (1983), Fasadklättraren (1991), Deadly Desire (1992) and Headhunters (2009). Groth also composed the music for the theme song for the Emmu-winning DR-TV series The Eagle and Toung Andersen.

Since the television series taxa Groth also works regularly with the film and television director Niels Arden Oplev. In 2009, he received is second Danish Film Academy Award for his work on Oplev's Worlds Apart, Denmark's official entry for the nomination for Best Foreign Language Film at the Academy Awards.

Groth's score for Oplev's The Girl with the Dragon Tattoo was performed by Athelas Sinfonietta Copenhagen during the "préludes musicaux" in Cannes. It won him a nomination for Best Composer at the European Film Awards.

== Private life ==
Groth is married to the singer/songwriter Misen Groth. They live in Copenhagen. He also owns an apartment and recording studio in Hollywood Hills, Los Angeles.

== Selected filmography ==
=== Feature films ===
- Svart Lucia (1992)
- Chop Chop (2001)
- Drømmen (2006)
- The Girl with the Dragon Tattoo (2009)
- The Girl Who Played with Fire (2009)
- The Girl Who Kicked the Hornets' Nest (2009)
- Dead Man Down (2013)
- Speed Walking (2014)
- Skin Trade (2015)

=== TV series ===
- Första Kärleken (1992)
- Taxa (1997–1999)
- Unit One (2000–2004)
- The Eagle (2004–2006)
- Young Andersen (2005)
- Unforgettable (2011–present)
- Modus (2015–2018)
- Wisting (2019)

== See also ==
- List of Danish composers
