= Elsa Andersson =

Sweden's first female aviator and stunt parachutist

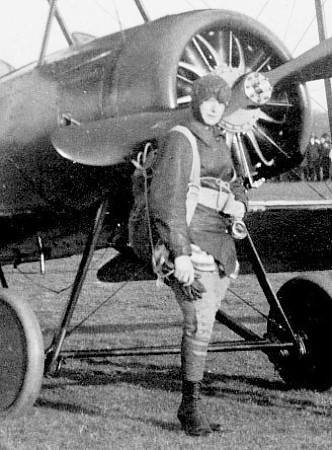
- Elsa Andersson in c. 1921
- Born: 27 April 1897; Strövelstorp, Sweden
- Died: 22 January 1922 (aged 24); Alsen, Sweden
- Occupations: aviator, stunt parachutist

Elsa Teresia Andersson (27 April 1897 in Strövelstorp, Sweden – 22 January 1922) was Sweden's first female aviator and stunt parachutist.

She was the daughter of a poor farmer in Strövelstorp in the Scanian countryside. Her mother died when she was aged six. Her elder brother left the family and sought a new life in America.

Always showing determination and ambition, she wanted to become more than just a farmer's wife and so, aged 21, in 1920, she learned to fly, becoming Sweden's first woman pilot. Her diploma was "no. 203". Not content with that, she went to Germany to learn parachute jumping.

In 1922, Andersson was killed on her third jump in Askersund, Sweden. Thousands of spectators were gathering below on the ice of the frozen lake Alsen. She had trouble releasing her parachute, which finally opened only a small distance from the treetops and she crashed violently into the ground.

In 1926, the Swedish Aero Club erected a three-metre-high obelisk as a memorial in the place where she was found dead.

== Novel and film ==
- In 1996 the Swedish novelist Jacques Werup adapted her life in his novel Den ofullbordade himlen ("The Imperfect Sky").
- In 2001 the novel was the basis for the film by Jan Troell Så vit som en snö (a.k.a. As White as a Snow) in which Andersson was played by the actress Amanda Ooms. The film was awarded the Swedish critics' prize for best Swedish film of the year. The film depicted her as having affairs with both sexes, but it is not clear how accurately this reflected Andersson's real life.
- Werup, Jacques: Den ofullbordade himlen. [Stockholm] : Bonnier, 1996. - ISBN 91-0-056231-9 (Swedish edition).
