= 28th Guldbagge Awards =

Annual Swedish film awards ceremony

- Date: 1 March 1993
- Site: Cirkus, Stockholm, Sweden

Highlights
- Best Picture: House of Angels
- Most awards: House of Angels (2); The Best Intentions (2)
- Most nominations: The Best Intentions (6)

The 28th Guldbagge Awards ceremony, presented by the Swedish Film Institute, honored the best Swedish films of 1992, and took place on 1 March 1993. House of Angels directed by Colin Nutley was presented with the award for Best Film.

== Winner and nominees ==
=== Awards ===
Winners are listed first and highlighted in boldface.

**Best Film**: **House of Angels**; Night of the Orangutan; The Best Intentions	**Best Director**: **Colin Nutley – House of Angels**; Kjell-Åke Andersson – Night of the Orangutan; Bille August – The Best Intentions
**Best Actress in a leading role**: **Pernilla August – The Best Intentions**; Helena Bergström – House of Angels; Tova Magnusson Norling – Svart Lucia	**Best Actor in a leading role**: **Rolf Lassgård – Night of the Orangutan**; Thommy Berggren – Sunday's Children; Samuel Fröler – The Best Intentions
**Best Screenplay**: **Ingmar Bergman – The Best Intentions**; Kjell-Åke Andersson and Magnus Nilsson – Night of the Orangutan; Colin Nutley – House of Angels	**Best Cinematography**: **Tony Forsberg – Sunday's Children**; Jens Fischer – Svart Lucia; Jörgen Persson – The Best Intentions; Jens Fischer – House of Angels
**Best Foreign Film**: **Husbands and Wives (United States)**; Raise the Red Lantern (China, Hong Kong); Fried Green Tomatoes (United States)	**Creative Achievement**: **Anna Asp**; **Ernst Günther**
**The Ingmar Bergman Award**: **Gunnar Fischer**
