= The Journey to Melonia =

Voyage to Melonia
- Theatrical release poster
- Directed by: Per Åhlin
- Screenplay by: Per Åhlin; Karl Rasmusson
- Based on: The Tempest by William Shakespeare
- Produced by: Katinka Faragó; Klas Olofsson
- Starring: Allan Edwall; Robin Carlsson; Olle Sarri; Tomas von Brömssen
- Edited by: Per Åhlin
- Music by: Björn Isfält
- Production companies: PennFilm Studio AB; Svenska Filminstitutet; Sveriges Television; Filmhuset; Norsk Film; Sandrews
- Distributed by: Sandrew Metronome
- Release dates: 15 December 1989 (Sweden); 7 February 1990 (Norway)
- Running time: 104 minutes
- Countries: Sweden; Norway
- Language: Swedish
- Budget: SEK 22 million

Voyage to Melonia (Swedish: Resan till Melonia; full English title: Voyage to Melonia: A fantasy loosely based on Shakespeare's 'The Tempest') is a 1989 Swedish-Norwegian animated adventure fantasy film directed by Per Åhlin, loosely based on William Shakespeare's The Tempest, with further inspiration from Jules Verne's Propeller Island and Charles Dickens' Oliver Twist. It was Åhlin's first fully animated feature film, as his earlier films Out of an Old Man's Head and Dunderklumpen! had both used a mix of animation and live action.

The film won two Guldbagge Awards for Best Creative Achievement (a category with three awards for technical achievements without their own categories); the first to Åhlin for the animation, the second to Björn Isfält for the score.

== Plot ==
The beautiful paradise island Melonia is inhabited by the sorcerer Prospero with his daughter Miranda, the albatross Ariel, the good-natured vegetable-faced gardener Caliban and William the dog-nosed poet. They live a generally peaceful life, except for Caliban who has to work hard with the garden. A few miles away lies the dark island Plutonia, where the greedy capitalists Slug and Slagg rule. Once as green and flourishing as Melonia, Plutonia is now perceived as hell on earth, where children are forced to, under slave conditions, build weapons and tools of war, which Slug and Slagg believe is the way of the future. With Plutonia's resources nearly exhausted, Slug and Slagg turn their gaze on the unexploited Melonia, scheming to take it over with a gigantic drill.

The movie begins with one of the child slaves, a boy named Ferdinand, escaping from Plutonia in a box, and ends up on Melonia, where Miranda and Prospero nurse him back to health. Prospero has just finished a magical growth elixir (humorously labelled "power soup" for the remainder of the movie), which Caliban is entrusted. Slug and Slagg kidnap Caliban and bring him to Plutonia. Ferdinand, Miranda, Prospero and some others journey to Plutonia in order to free Caliban, which eventually turns into a quest to free Ferdinand's enslaved friends. Eventually, Miranda helps the children escape by transforming them into birds and transporting them into an old theater, where William the poet is making a less than successful attempt at staging Shakespeare's The Tempest. After breaking out of his prison, the thirsty Caliban thoughtlessly drinks the elixir. Slug and Slagg, encouraged by Caliban's growth, attempt to coax him into working for them, but their rants of superiority by arms falls upon deaf ears. They then attempt to destroy Caliban using the great drill, but he easily lifts it off the ground and plunges it into the floor, causing the island to sink to the bottom of the ocean in a gigantic maelstrom. Slug and Slagg are unable to escape the maelstrom. The theater almost sinks as well, but is saved by Caliban. Prospero loses his magical powers, but accepts it readily, knowing that everybody's power will replace his magic. He frees Caliban and Ariel from his service, and the movie ends with a singing Ariel flying off into the sunset.

== Voice cast ==
- Allan Edwall as Prospero
- Robin Carlsson as Miranda
- Olle Sarri as Ferdinand
- Tomas von Brömssen as Ariel
- Jan-Olof Strandberg as William
- Ingvar Kjellson as Kapten Julgransfot (Captain Christmas tree stand)
- Ernst Günther as Caliban
- Eva Rydberg as Kockan (Cookie)
- Jan Blomberg as Slug (Sly)
- Hans Alfredson as Slagg (Slag)
- Nils Eklund as Rorsman (Helmsman)

== Production ==
With a budget of 22 million SEK (roughly US$3.1 million), Voyage to Melonia was, at the time, the most expensive Swedish animated film produced, much because of the long production process from 1982 to 1989. When making the script, Per Åhlin and Karl Rasmussen would pick lines from The Tempest they thought they might have use of, and then put them together into a coherent synopsis. An influence for the visual style was Jules Verne's Propeller Island from 1895.

== Critical reception ==
The reviews were generally very positive, with film magazine Chaplin's reviewer Göran Ribe comparing it to Jiří Trnka's A Midsummer Night's Dream and Paul Grimault's The King and the Mockingbird. Some critique was given regarding the slow pace and ambiguous tone, making it hard to distinguish whether it was a children's film or aimed for adults. Others complained about the somewhat naïve message.

The most negative review came from Variety, where Keith Keller wrote: "The Voyage to Melonia by Per Åhlin, Sweden's past master of animated films, probably has aimed over everybody's head with this go at The Tempest. Seven years in the making at a locally extraordinary cost $3.5-million, pic looks big but soon sags dangerously, and eventually ruptures."
