= Gossip (2000 Swedish film) =

Swedish comedy/drama film directed by Colin Nutley

DVD-cover.

Gossip is a 2000 Swedish comedy/drama film. It was directed and written by Colin Nutley.

An unrelated American film with the same name as the Swedish film was released by Warner Bros. on April 21 that same year to negative reviews from critics.

== Plot ==
Ten actresses screen test for the title role of a remake of Queen Christina.

== Cast ==
- Pernilla August ... as Molly Fischer
- Helena Bergström ... as Stella Lindberg
- Lena Endre ... as Rebecca Olsson-Frigårdh
- Stina Ekblad ... as Eivor Pellas
- Harriet Andersson ... Camilla Steen
- Ewa Fröling ... Georgina Seth
- Margaretha Krook ... Ingrid Seth
- Marika Lagercrantz ... Karin Kalters
