= As White as in Snow =

2001 film by Jan Troell

- Swedish DVD cover
- Directed by: Jan Troell
- Written by: Jacques Werup (novel); Jan Troell; Karl-Erik Olsson-Snogerod; Jimmy Karlsson
- Produced by: Lars Hermann; Kerstin Bonnier; Erik Crone; Johan Mardell
- Starring: Amanda Ooms; Rikard Wolff; Björn Granath; Björn Kjellman
- Edited by: Jan Troell
- Music by: Score; Magnus Dahlberg
- Distributed by: Svensk Filmindustri
- Release date: 16 February 2001 (Sweden)
- Running time: 154 minutes
- Country: Sweden
- Language: Swedish
- Budget: SEK 30 million

As White as in Snow (Swedish title: Så vit som en snö) is a Swedish film which was released to cinemas in Sweden on 16 February 2001, directed by Jan Troell. It won three Guldbagge Awards, for best film, best direction and best cinematography, and was nominated for best screenplay.

The screenplay is based on the novel Den ofullbordade himlen by Jacques Werup, which in turn is very loosely inspired by the life of Elsa Andersson, the first woman aviator in Sweden. She is portrayed by Amanda Ooms in the movie. Other key characters are played by Björn Granath, Stina Ekblad, Shanti Roney, Björn Kjellman, Reine Brynolfsson and Rikard Wolff.

The grammatically awkward title (literally translated "As white as a snow") is a quote from a poem/song ("Lejonbruden"), which is performed in the movie.

== Cast ==
- Amanda Ooms - Elsa Andersson
- Rikard Wolff - Robert Friedman
- Björn Granath - Sven Andersson
- Björn Kjellman - Erik Magnusson
- Stina Ekblad - Stine
- Shanti Roney - Lars Andersson
- Hans Pålsson - Felix Hansson
- Antti Reini - Koivunen
- Reine Brynolfsson - Enoch Thulin
- Maria Heiskanen - Merja
