= Krakel Spektakel =

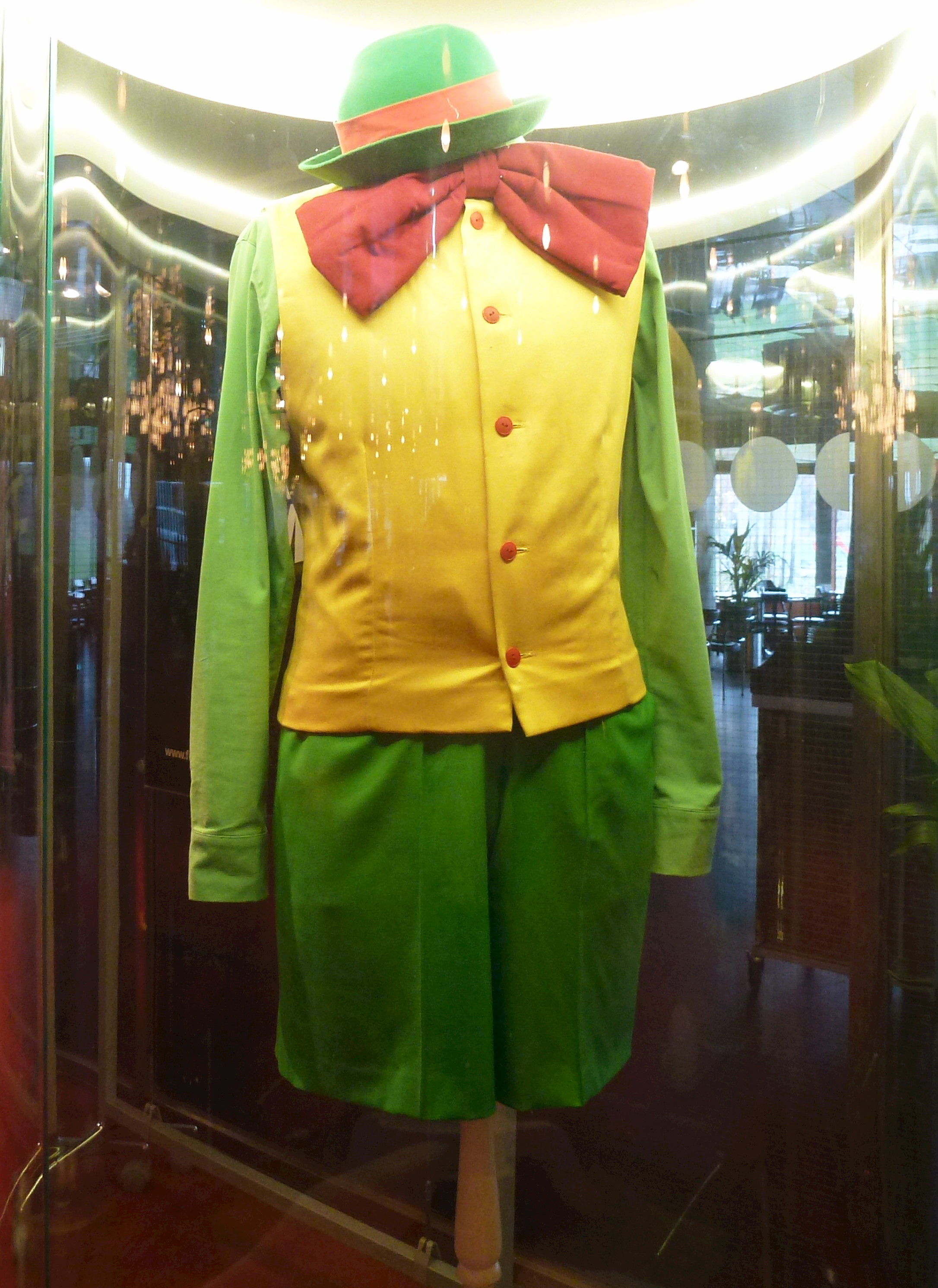
- Krakel Spektakel's costume
- Directed by: Elisabet Gustafsson
- Written by: Torbjörn Jansson
- Based on: Poems and stories by Lennart Hellsing
- Starring: Lea Stojanov; Vanja Blomkvist; Anton Lundqvist
- Cinematography: Alex Lindén
- Production company: Filmlance International AB
- Release date: September 5, 2014
- Running time: 75 minutes
- Country: Sweden
- Language: Swedish

Krakel Spektakel is a 2014 Swedish children's film musical directed by Elisabet Gustafsson, based on the character of the same name created by Lennart Hellsing.

The film was produced by Ulf Synnerholm for Filmlance International AB. The script was written by Torbjörn Jansson and cinematography was by Alex Lindén. The film uses live action with painted backdrops.

== Plot ==
Annabell Olsson (Lea Stojanov) is a girl looking for the wizard who turned himself into a glass of lemonade and drank himself, 700 years ago (in the children's song "Trollkarlen från Indialand", with lyrics by Hellsing).

== Cast ==
- Lea Stojanov – Annabell Olsson
- Vanja Blomkvist – Grandpa/Man in the moon
- Anton Lundqvist – Krakel Spektakel
- Lina Ljungqvist – Cousin Vitamin
- Martin Eliasson – Opsis Kalopsis
- Anki Larsson – Berit Blomkål
- Olof Wretling – Brother Gurka 1
- Sven Björklund – Brother Gurka 2
- Ika Nord – Coachman
- Ivan Mathias Petersson – Peter Palsternack
- Shima Niavarani – Selma Selleri
- Michael Jonsson – Gabriel Gräslök
- Henrik Dorsin – Emperor of China
- Carl Englén – Dinkelidunk, the monk
- Mikael Odhag – Man in the moon
- Vanna Rosenberg – Mama
- Andreas La Chenardière – Papa

== Reception ==
One critic found the film a delightful new creation based on various works by Hellsing, and also referring to classics like The Wizard of Oz, The Lord of the Rings, and Alice in Wonderland, while another considered it a failed attempt to profit from Hellsing's beloved characters.
