= Reine Brynolfsson =

Swedish actor (born 1953)

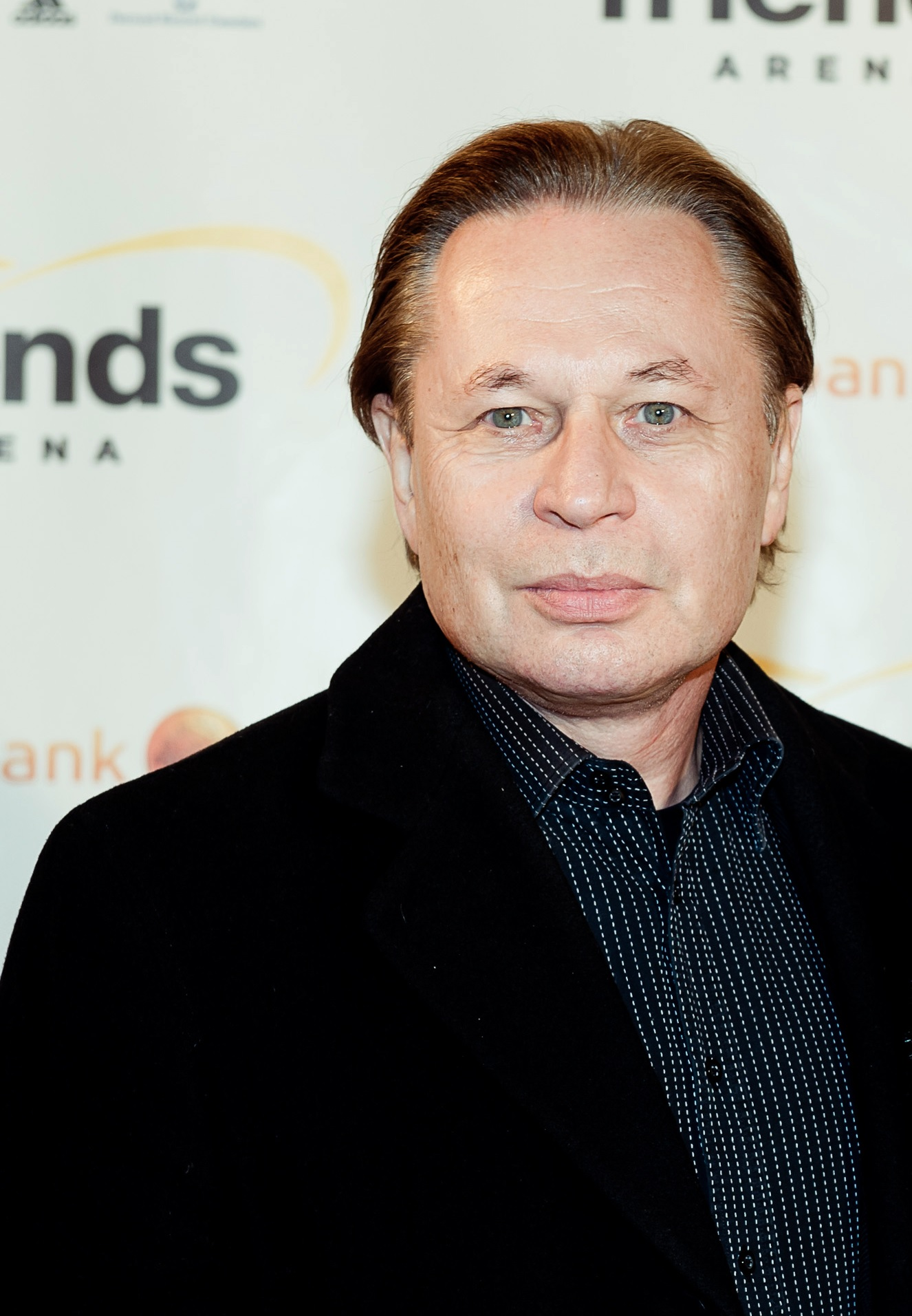
- Reine Brynolfsson in 2012.
- Born: Reine Claes-Göran Brynolfsson; 15 January 1953 (age 73); Gothenburg, Sweden
- Occupation: Actor
- Years active: 1982–present
- Children: 2

Reine Claes-Göran Brynolfsson (born 15 January 1953) is a Swedish actor. He was born in Gothenburg.

== Filmography ==
Year	Title	Role	Notes
1985	Ofelia kommer til byen	John	
1986	Moa	Harry	
1986	The Serpent's Way	Jani	
1988	In the Shadow of the Raven	Trausti	
1990	Blankt vapen	Bruno	
1990	Blackjack	Robert Mårbrink	
1991	The White Viking		
1992	Hammar	Drawe	
1992	House of Angels	Henning Collmer, vicar	
1992	Svart Lucia	Spielman, Teacher	
1993	The Slingshot	Hinke Berggren	
1993	Murder at the Savoy	Hampus Broberg	
1993	Sista dansen	Claes Särlefalk	
1994	Pillertrillaren	Larsson	
1994	Illusioner	Erik	
1994	House of Angels – The Second Summer	Henning Collmer, vicar	
1996	Jerusalem	Tim	
1996	Rusar i hans famn	Tore	
1997	Adam & Eva	Sven	
1997	En kvinnas huvud	Wilhelm	
1997	Spring för livet	Närpolisen Tommy	
1998	The Last Contract	Bo Ekman	
1998	Les Misérables	Captain Beauvais	
1999	Ungfrúin góða og húsið	Hans	
2000	Knockout	Råttan	
2000	Anna	Morten	
2001	A Song for Martin	Biederman	
2001	As White as in Snow	Enoch Thulin	
2001	Deadline	Spiken	
2003	Kitchen Stories	Malmberg	
2003	Paradiset (2003 film)	Spiken	
2005	Bang Bang Orangutang	Åke's Boss	
2005	Blodsbröder	Olle	
2006	7 miljonärer	André / Kowalski	
2006	Sökarna: Återkomsten	Roger	
2007	Parents	Johann	
2010	House of Angels – Third Time Lucky	Henning Collmer	
2013	Shed No Tears	Bosse	
2016	Under pyramiden	Bo Lauritz	
2017	Ravens	Agne	
2020	Love & Anarchy	Friedrich Jägerstedt	
