= Ernst Günther =

Swedish actor

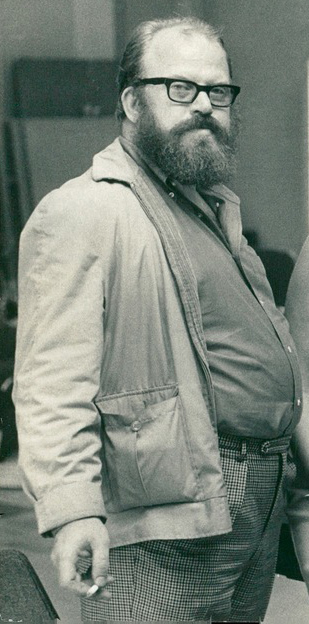
- Günther in 1968
- Born: Ernst Harry Ingemar Günther; 3 June 1933; Karlskrona, Sweden
- Died: 8 December 1999 (aged 66); Glemmingebro, Skåne län, Sweden
- Occupation: Actor
- Years active: 1962–1999

Ernst Harry Ingemar Günther (3 June 1933 – 8 December 1999) was a Swedish actor. He appeared in 66 films and television shows between 1962 and 1999. He starred in the 1974 film Gangsterfilmen, which entered into the 25th Berlin International Film Festival. At the 28th Guldbagge Awards he won the Creative Achievement award.

== Partial filmography ==
- Out of an Old Man's Head (1968) - Man som kastar bildäck
- Som natt och dag (1969) - Sture
- Made in Sweden (1969) - Party guest
- Rötmånad (1970) - Jansson
- A Handful of Love (1974) - Finland
- Gangsterfilmen (1974) - Anders Andersson
- Ungkarlshotellet (1975) - Man
- Förvandlingen (1976) - Gregor's Father
- Vi har många namn (1976) - Police Inspector
- Games of Love and Loneliness (1977) - Jacob Randel
- Måndagarna med Fanny (1977) - Butcher
- Chez Nous (1978) - Melin
- Linus eller Tegelhusets hemlighet (1979) - Eriksson
- Gå på vattnet om du kan (1979) - Mr. Löv
- Sverige åt svenskarna (1980) - Karl Ragnar
- Brusten himmel (1982) - Molin
- Fanny and Alexander (1982) - Rector Magnificus - Teatern
- Sköna juveler (1984) - Gustav
- The Man from Majorca (1984) - Dahlgren
- Åke and His World (1984) - Reverend
- Smugglarkungen (1985) - Strauss
- Love Me! (1986) - Socialinspektören
- I lagens namn (1986) - Walltin
- The Serpent's Way (1986) - Ol Karlsa
- Valhalla (1986) - Thor (voice)
- The Journey to Melonia (1989) - Caliban (voice)
- Exit (1990) - Panda (voice)
- Hjälten (1990) - The Old Man
- Goda människor (1990) - The father
- House of Angels (1992) - Gottfrid Pettersson
- The Best Intentions (1992) - Freddy Paulin
- Karlakórinn Hekla (1992) - Foreldri Möggu
- Kådisbellan (1993) - Principal
- Sista dansen (1993) - Opera Director
- Good Night, Irene (1994) - Otto
- House of Angels – The Second Summer (1994) - Gottfrid Pettersson
- Hundarna i Riga (1995) - Fadern
- Den vita lejoninnan (1996) - Fadern
