= Blackjack (1990 film) =

- Directed by: Colin Nutley
- Screenplay by: Colin Nutley; Johanna Hald
- Produced by: Waldemar Bergendahl
- Starring: Helena Bergström; Jan Mybrand; Johannes Brost; Reine Brynolfsson; Carl Kjellgren; Ing-Marie Carlsson
- Music by: Bert Månson
- Production company: Svensk Filmindustri
- Release date: 7 October 1990 (Sweden)
- Running time: 111 minutes
- Country: Sweden
- Language: Swedish

Blackjack is a Swedish drama comedy film directed by Colin Nutley which was released to cinemas in Sweden on 7 October 1990.

== Plot ==
Blackjack is set in a dansband environment in Hedesunda and around Gävle during the Christmas and holiday season.

== See also ==
- List of Christmas films
