= Headhunter (film) =

- Directed by: Rumle Hammerich
- Written by: Rumle Hammerich
- Starring: Lars Mikkelsen; Charlotte Munck
- Cinematography: Dan Laustsen
- Distributed by: Nordisk Film
- Release date: 28 August 2009
- Running time: 1h 48min
- Country: Denmark
- Language: Danish

Headhunter is a 2009 Danish thriller film directed by Rumle Hammerich.

== Cast ==
- Lars Mikkelsen - Martin Vinge
- Charlotte Munck - Nina
- Burkhard Forstreuter - Christian Vestergaard
- Søren Spanning - Vestergaards stemme
- Charlotte Fich - Pernille
- Troels Lyby - Troels
