= Per Åhlin =

Swedish artist and film director (1931–2023)

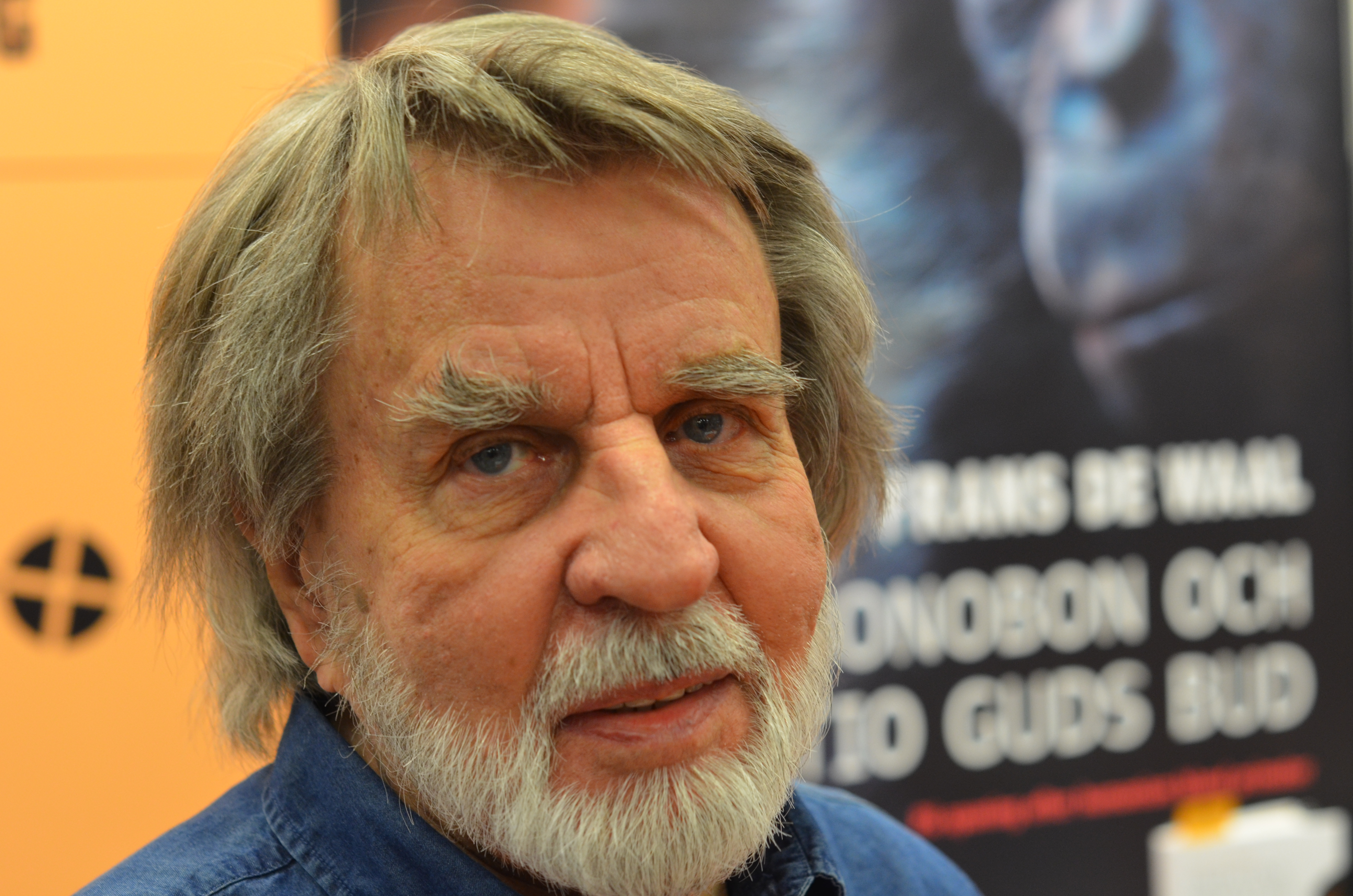
- Åhlin in 2013
- Born: 7 August 1931; Hofors, Sweden
- Died: 1 May 2023 (aged 91)
- Occupation(s): Film director, artist
- Years active: 1964–2023

Per Johan Axel Åhlin (7 August 1931 – 1 May 2023) was a Swedish artist and director of animated films. He is known for his collaborations with the comedy duo Hasse & Tage and for his own projects such as the animated short film and television film Sagan om Karl-Bertil Jonssons julafton and the feature film Voyage to Melonia.

== Life and career ==
Åhlin started his career as an artist for the Hasse & Tage production Svenska bilder from 1964. After that he worked on several other Hasse & Tage films, including the largely animated Out of an Old Man's Head from 1968, and The Adventures of Picasso from 1978, where he provided and animated Picasso's paintings. In 1970 he started his own animation studio, PennFilm Studio AB situated in Hököpinge, and directed many feature-length films and several shorts, including Sagan om Karl-Bertil Jonssons julafton which is shown on television every Christmas Eve in Sweden, Norway, and Finland.

In 1975 at the 11th Guldbagge Awards, Åhlin won a special achievement award for Dunderklumpen!. In 1990 at the 25th Guldbagge Awards he won the Creative Achievement award.

Although eventually best known for his work on children's film, Åhlin was always more interested in films for adult audiences. He has commented on the difficulties of making animated films with adult themes: "I don't know whether the problem lies in the audience or the marketing. But think like this: if you draw like Picasso, Doré or Sergel, then those are images that have no connection to film. If they then would be animated and suddenly started to move – would they become children's film then? I can't understand this!"

Åhlin died on 1 May 2023, at age 91.

== Selected filmography ==
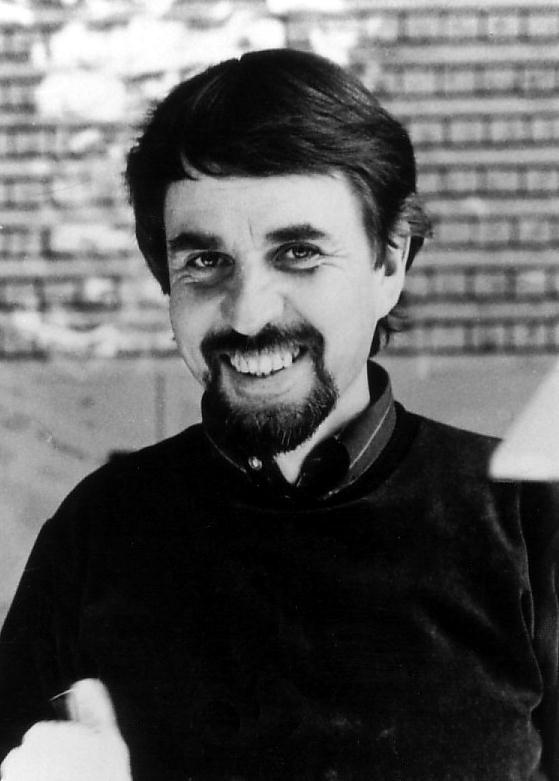
Åhlin in the 1960s

- Out of an Old Man's Head (I huvet på en gammal gubbe) (1968)
- Dunderklumpen! (1974)
- Sagan om Karl-Bertil Jonssons julafton (1975) short film
- Voyage to Melonia (Resan till Melonia) (1989)
- The Dog Hotel (Hundhotellet) (2000)
- That Boy Emil (2013)

=== Unfinished projects ===
Åhlin had developed several films which had never been finished due to lack of funding or interested producers. His personal dream project, which had been in development since 1992, was the feature film Hoffmanns ögon ("Hoffmann's eyes"), which is based on Jacques Offenbach's opera The Tales of Hoffmann. As of 2009, Åhlin had said that he still occasionally worked on the project on his own: "Hopefully it can become a few minutes which can give potential producers remorse in the future". Other unfinished films include Den magiska saxofonen ("The magic saxophone"), HC Andersen, and an adaptation of Eric Linklater's The Wind on the Moon, with a screenplay by Ulf Stark. Designs and other finished material from these projects have been exhibited multiple times at events in Sweden.
