= Bianca Kronlöf =

Swedish actress, comedian and screenwriter

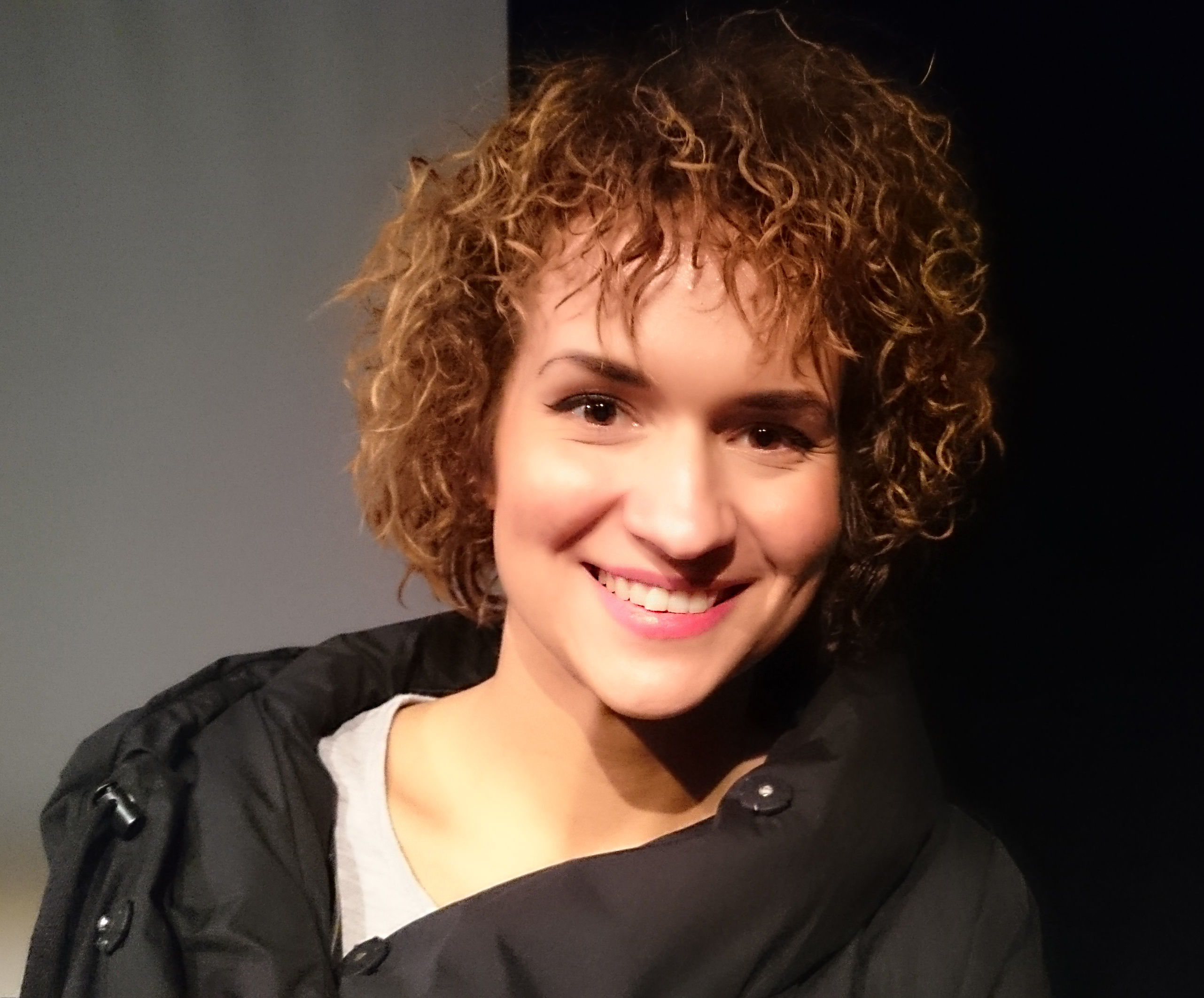
- Kronlöf in January 2015
- Born: Bianca Alicia Kronlöf; 30 March 1985 (age 41); Stockholm, Sweden
- Occupations: Actress, comedian and screenwriter
- Notable work: Musikhjälpen

Bianca Alicia Kronlöf (born 30 March 1985) is a Swedish actress, comedian and screenwriter.

== Life ==
Born and raised in Stockholm, Kronlöf is Sweden-Finnish as her parents are from Vaasa, Finland; her father is a Swedish-speaking Finn, mother Finnish, maternal grandmother Scottish, and through her maternal grandfather she has Afro-Trinidadian ancestry. Kronlöf grew up in Nynäshamn and studied at the Stockholm estetiska gymnasium and went on to study at the Teaterhögskolan at University of Gothenburg between 2007 and 2011. She has worked as an illustrator for, among others, SIDA and Barnens rätt i samhället better known as BRIS. Kronlöf has also participated in video-art at Liljevalchs konsthall. She is known for her satirical humor and her work for feminism.

In 2012, she garnered attention for her YouTube videos in which she played the role of Snubben ("the dude") and highlights the subjects of racism and sexism. During her years of studies in Gothenburg, Kronlöf along with two other classmates started the feminist theater group Gruppen.

In 2013, she was a travelling reporter for the Sveriges Radio and Sveriges Television charity show Musikhjälpen. She travelled to Bangladesh to report on the situation for women in the country. When Kronlöf's comedy show Full patte had its 2014 premiere on SVT Flow, her sister Tiffany Kronlöf also participated in the show.

The magazine Nöjesguiden labeled Kronlöf and her sister Tiffany as "two of the biggest feminist role models in the country". During 2014, Kronlöf participated in the comedy series Hårdvinklat on TV3.

In 2014 and 2015, she had lead roles in two films, the Swedish feature Underdog (Swedish title Svenskjävel) and the Norwegian feature Verden venter. She is also part of the theater play Gruppen och herrarna! at Stora Teatern in Gothenburg.

Kronlöf won the Métronews Best Actress award at 2014's Les Arcs Film Festival for her performance in Underdog.

== Partial filmography ==
=== Films ===
- Underdog (2014)
- Verden venter (2014)
- Så länge hjärtat slår (2024)

=== Television ===
- Musikhjälpen (2013) – herself
- Hårdvinklat (2014) – herself
- Full patte (2014–2017)
- Bäst i test (2017) – herself
- Jakten på tidskristallen (2017)
- Thin Ice (2020)
