= Thin Ice (2020 TV series) =

Swedish crime drama television series

- Tunn Is
- Genre: Thriller; Crime drama
- Written by: Birkir Blær Ingólfsson, Jónas Margeir Ingólfsson, Jóhann Ævar Grímsson
- Directed by: Cecilie A. Mosli, Thale Persen, Guðjón Jónsson
- Country of origin: Sweden
- Original languages: Swedish; English; Greenlandic; Danish
- No. of series: 1
- No. of episodes: 8

Production
- Running time: 44 minutes
- Production company: C More TV4 Yellow Bird

Original release
- Release: 3 February 2020

Thin Ice is a 2020 television series set in Greenland and the Icelandic seas. A co-production between Icelandic, French and Swedish companies the first season was broadcast in 2020. It is the most expensive TV series ever produced in Iceland.

== Synopsis ==
An attack on a Swedish oil exploration vessel and the disappearance of its crew takes intelligence officer Liv Hermanson to the Greenland village of Tasiilaq to investigate. The cast includes Davíð Guðbrandsson, Lena Endre, Bianca Kronlöf and Guðjón Ragnarsson.

== Production ==
Although the series is mostly set in Greenland, filming largely took place in Iceland with the town of Stykkishólmur serving as one of the main settings.
