= House of Angels =

1992 film

- DVD cover art
- Directed by: Colin Nutley
- Written by: Colin Nutley
- Produced by: Lars Jönsson; Lars Dahlquist
- Starring: Helena Bergström, Rikard Wolff, Sven Wollter, Reine Brynolfsson, Ernst Günther, Viveka Seldahl
- Cinematography: Jens Fischer
- Release date: 21 February 1992 (Sweden)
- Running time: 127 minutes
- Countries: Sweden, Denmark, Norway
- Language: Swedish

House of Angels (Swedish: Änglagård) is a Swedish drama film which was released to cinemas in Sweden on 21 February 1992, about a little village in Västergötland, Sweden, where an aging recluse lives in a mansion on a large wooded property. One day he is accidentally killed and an unknown relative by the name of Fanny Zander inherits the mansion and land. When she and her friend Zac arrive, they turn life in the staid village upside down.

The film was screened out of competition at the 1992 Cannes Film Festival. At the 28th Guldbagge Awards the film won the awards for Best Film and Best Director. It was also nominated for Best Actress (Helena Bergström), Best Screenplay and Best Cinematography (Jens Fischer). The film was selected as the Swedish entry for the Best Foreign Language Film at the 65th Academy Awards, but was not accepted as a nominee.

A sequel, Änglagård – andra sommaren, was produced in 1994. A second sequel, Änglagård – tredje gången gillt, was released on DVD and Blu-ray on 25 May 2011.

== Cast ==
- Helena Bergström as Fanny Zander
- Rikard Wolff as Zac
- Sven Wollter as Axel Flogfält
- Reine Brynolfsson as Henning Collmer, vicar
- Ernst Günther as Gottfrid Pettersson
- Viveka Seldahl as Rut Flogfält
- Per Oscarsson as Erik Zander
- Tord Peterson as Ivar Pettersson
- Ing-Marie Carlsson as Eva Ågren
- Jan Mybrand as Per-Ove Ågren
- Peter Andersson as Ragnar Zetterberg
- Jakob Eklund as Mårten Flogfält
- Carl-Einar Häckner as Guest at Party
- Görel Crona as Guest at Party
- Thabo Motsieola as Guest at Party

== Stage musical ==
A Swedish stage musical adaptation of the film written by Edward af Sillen, who is also directing, and Daniel Réhn, with music by Fredrik Kempe will open at the Oscarsteatern in Stockholm on September 10, 2023. Starring two of Sweden's biggest musical theatre names Helen Sjöholm and Tommy Körberg.

== Reception ==
=== Critical response ===
House of Angels has an approval rating of 80% on review aggregator website Rotten Tomatoes, based on 5 reviews, and an average rating of 7.3/10.

== See also ==
- List of submissions to the 65th Academy Awards for Best Foreign Language Film
- List of Swedish submissions for the Academy Award for Best Foreign Language Film
