= Annika (1984 TV series) =

- Genre: Romantic drama
- Written by: Colin Nutley; Sven-Gösta Holst
- Directed by: Colin Nutley
- Starring: Christina Rignér; Jesse Birdsall; Vas Blackwood; Don Henderson
- Countries of origin: United Kingdom; Sweden
- Original languages: English; Swedish
- No. of series: 1
- No. of episodes: 3

Production
- Executive producers: Lewis Rudd; Ingrid Edstom
- Producer: Colin Nutley
- Cinematography: Jens Fischer
- Running time: 3 x 60 minute episodes
- Production company: Central Independent Television

Original release
- Network: ITV
- Release: 10 August – 24 August 1984

Annika is a three-part miniseries written and produced by Colin Nutley and Sven-Gösta Holst and televised in 1984. It tells the story of a romance between Pete, an eighteen-year-old Isle of Wight deck chair attendant (played by Jesse Birdsall), and a Swedish foreign language student, the titular Annika (played by Christina Rignér).

== Cast ==
- Christina Rignér as Annika Sellberg
- Jesse Birdsall as Pete Daniels
- Ann-Charlotte Stålhammar as Pia
- Birger Österberg as Per
- Anders Bongenhielm as Torbjörn
- Vas Blackwood as Alan
- Lia Williams as Karen
- Mark Drewry as Bill Bartender
- Christer Boustedt as Mr. Sellberg
- Don Henderson as Mr. Daniels
- Lena Strömdahl as Mrs. Sellberg

== Episodes ==
No.	Episode	Directed by	Written by	Original release date
1	The Beginning	Colin Nutley	Colin Nutley	10 August 1984
Pete is working another summer as a deck chair attendant in Ryde on the Isle of Wight. His life changes when he meets Annika, a Swedish foreign language student visiting the Island for the summer.
2	The Middle	Colin Nutley	Colin Nutley	17 August 1984
Annika returns home to Stockholm. Pete misses her and decides to follow her to Sweden. He stays with her family but finds some aspects of Swedish culture difficult to adapt to.
3	The End	Colin Nutley	Colin Nutley	24 August 1984
Pete and Annika's relationship is under strain following tragic events. Without anywhere to live Pete eventually decides to return to the United Kingdom.

== Production ==
=== Background ===
Swedish foreign language students from companies such as EF have been regular visitors to the Isle of Wight since the 1970s and romances such as the one depicted in this series were not uncommon.

=== Filming locations ===
The series was filmed in and around Ryde, parts of London and in Sweden, Stockholm and the surrounding area. Ryde locations included the head of Ryde Pier (at the start of episode 1) and the Prince Consort bar.

=== Music ===
Episode 1 featured scenes in the Prince Consort bar with live music being played by the, then popular, Isle of Wight band The Waltons.

== Home media ==
A region 2 DVD entitled Annika The Complete Series was released by Network in 2011.

DVD cover for 2011 Network DVD release
