= Colin Nutley =

Sweden-based English filmmaker

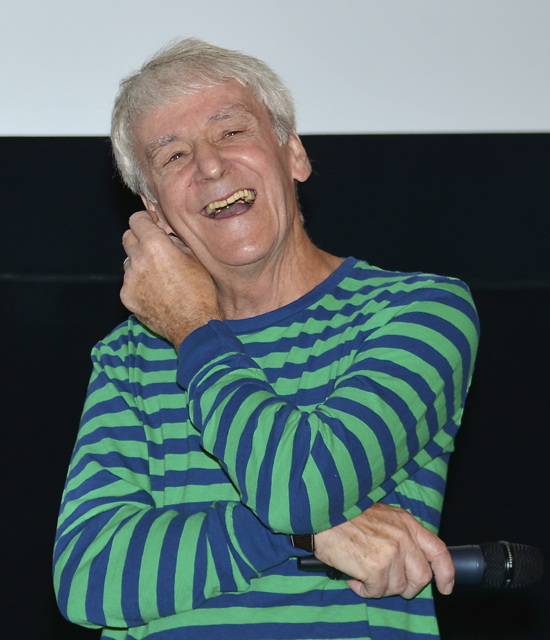
- Nutley in August 2014
- Born: 28 February 1944 (age 81); Gosport, England
- Occupation: Filmmaker
- Years active: 1976–present
- Spouse: Helena Bergström (m. 1990)
- Children: 3, including Molly

Colin James Nutley (born 28 February 1944) is an English filmmaker who has become known for his work in Sweden's film and television industry.

== Early life ==
Colin James Nutley was born in Gosport on 28 February 1944. He attended an art college in Portsmouth.

== Career ==
Nutley began his career in British television as a graphic designer. He then turned to drama and documentary filmmaking for ITV, BBC, and Channel 4. He directed the first two episodes of children's television series Press Gang, but was unhappy with the final edit and asked for his name to be removed from the credits. He was the driving force behind Southern Television's ITV-networked children's series The Flockton Flyer, taking personal responsibility for much of the casting and acting as a producer of the first series (1977) before producing and directing the second series (1978).

Nutley's work in Sweden began with the making of Annika, a TV series about a Swedish girl who spent three weeks on England's Isle of Wight as a language student. Then came the documentary Where Roses Never Die, a film about life in a small Swedish country village which was also the inspiration for House of Angels. His first feature The Ninth Company was a black comedy, the story of a group of young conscripts that tries to make a smart economic killing. Blackjack, was about love and betrayal in a small town, set against the backdrop of dance-music bands. House of Angels opened in 1992 and is to date one of the most loved Swedish films of all time. The film was awarded two Guldbagge Awards for "Best Film" and "Best Direction" at the Swedish Film Awards that year.

The Last Dance was a black comedy about a rollercoaster friendship between two big city couples, and won "Best Actress" and "Best Photography" awards at the 1993 Swedish Film Awards. House of Angels – the Second Summer opened on Christmas Day 1994 and was an immediate box office success. Such Is Life, a drama comedy about love, broken promises and fulfilled dreams, opened in Sweden in October 1996. Under the Sun, a story about trust, friendship and love set in the mid-1950s, opened on Christmas Day 1998 and Gossip, starring an ensemble cast of ten of Sweden's top actresses, opened all over Sweden on Christmas Day 2000. Deadline (2001) and Paradise (2003) were both based on Liza Marklund's best-selling novels. The Queen of Sheba's Pearls (2004) was an English language film set in post war England in the 1950s. Heartbreak Hotel opened in 2006 and Nutley's latest feature Angel in 2008.

House of Angels, The Last Dance and Under the Sun have all been nominated by the Swedish Film Institute to represent Sweden as Best Foreign Language Film at the Academy Awards (1993, 1994 and 1999). House of Angels was screened out of competition at the 1992 Cannes Film Festival. Under the Sun was nominated for an Academy Award for Best Foreign Language Film and also received the Special Jury Prize at the San Sebastian Film Festival.

== Personal life ==
In 1990, Nutley married Swedish actress Helena Bergström, whom he met while filming Blackjack. He is 20 years older than her and was married when they met. They have a son named Timothy and a daughter named Molly, who is an actress. He also has a son named Daniel from his previous marriage. They split their time between an apartment in Kungsholmen in central Stockholm and a house on Lovön.

== Filmography ==
=== TV ===
- Annika (1983) TV series
- Where Roses Never Die (Där Rosor Aldrig Dör) 1984 documentary
- Fifth Generation (Femte Generationen) 1985 series
- Long Way Home (Vägen Hem) 1989
- Tillsammans med Strömstedts 2017 TV series
- Saknad 2017 TV series
- Bröllop, begravning och dop 2019 TV series

=== Film ===
- The Ninth Company (Nionde Kompaniet) 1987
- Blackjack (Blackjack) 1990
- House of Angels (Änglagård) 1992
- The Last Dance (Sista Dansen) 1993
- House of Angels – The Second Summer (Änglagård – Andra Sommaren) 1994
- Such Is Life (Sånt är Livet) 1996
- Under the Sun (Under Solen) 1998
- Gossip (Gossip) 2000
- Deadline (Sprängaren) 2001
- Paradise (Paradiset) 2003
- The Queen of Sheba's Pearls 2004
- Heartbreak Hotel 2006
- Angel 2008
- House of Angels – Third Time Lucky (Änglagård – Tredje gången gillt) 2010
- Medicinen 2014
