= The Queen of Sheba's Pearls =

2004 Swedish-British drama film

Swedish cover.

The Queen of Sheba's Pearls is a 2004 Swedish-British drama film set in England post-WWII.

== Plot introduction ==
Helena Bergström plays Nancy Ackerman who mysteriously arrives on the Pretty family's doorstep. Ackerman looks eerily similar to Jack Bradley's (James Hawkins) mother who inexplicably died in an WWII-related accident eight years prior. As the film progresses, it becomes clear that Ackerman is the identical twin separated from Jack's mother at birth. Meanwhile Jack's father, a former marine, has clouded feelings for Ackerman; he cannot decide if his feelings for her are growing on their own merits or are based on those towards his deceased wife. Ackerman also proves to be an unsettling force in Jack's life by offering advice that turns out to be eerily omniscient and fairy godmother-like.

== Production ==
The movie was produced, directed and written by Colin Nutley who is married to the film's lead, Helena Bergström.

== Cast ==
- Helena Bergström ... Nancy Ackerman/Emily Bradley
- Lorcan Cranitch ... Harold Bradley
- Lindsay Duncan ... Audrey Pretty
- Tim Dutton ... Father Talbot
- Rolf Lassgård ... Deafy
- Natasha Little ... Peggy Pretty
- Elizabeth Spriggs ... Laura Pretty
- Peter Vaughan ... Edward Pretty
- Rollo Weeks ... Jack Bradley
- Eileen Atkins ... School matron
- Marc Pickering ... Dinger Bell
- Simon Day ... Rektorn
- Bohdan Poraj ... Teacher
- John Joe Regan ... Geoffrey Thicket
- James Hawkins ... Young Jack Bradley
- Alexander Goggins ... Mr Jenkins

== Awards and recognition ==
According to IMDb, Jens Fischer was nominated for the Silver and Gold Frogs and won the Silver Frog at the 2005 Camerimage Festival for his work as the lighting director for the film. The Guldbagge Film Festival awarded Lasse Liljeholm and Eddie Axberg Best Achievement for sound editing and Jens Fischer was also awarded Best Cinematography. Finally, Colin Nutley was nominated for the Crystal Globe at the Karlovy Vary International Film Festival.

== Reception and reviews ==
A number of positive reviews followed the release of The Queen of Sheba's Pearls. Variety magazine called the film "unquestionably [Nutley's] most substantial movie to date." Sandra Hall, an Australian critic, provided a more mixed review of the film, saying that Nutley is "not great on plot mechanics and narrative dovetailing. He's into vignettes rather than the big picture. Yet in its anecdotal way, the film somehow hangs together, shaping itself into a benign and sunny take on a plot device we've often seen before in films - about a fraying household rejuvenated by the presence of a seductive stranger." However, while critics, film analysts, and awards committees agreed that the film has superb casting and behind the scenes elements, it is not especially popular or well-known with the general public, as evidenced by the lack of comments and support on a number of public review sites including Flixster and Rotten Tomatoes.
