= Jens Fischer =

Swedish cinematographer (born 1946)

- Born: 24 August 1946 (age 79); Stockholm, Sweden
- Occupation: Cinematographer
- Years active: 1972–present

Jens Fischer (born 24 August 1946) is a Swedish cinematographer. According to Criterion Cast, Jens Fischer is known as "one of the most distinguished Swedish cinematographers of the 1990s and 2000s."

== Early life and education ==
Jens Fischer was born in Sweden. His mother Gull Söderblom was the sister of Åke Söderblom, while his father Gunnar Fischer was a film director and photographer who worked closely with Ingmar Bergman. Both Jens and his brother Peter went on to become cinematographers.

== Career ==
In 1974, he worked with his father Gunnar Fischer on Parade by Jacques Tati. Jens and his brother Peter also played the sons of Eva Dahlbeck in Waiting Women. According to Criterion Cast, Jens Fischer was "one of the most distinguished Swedish cinematographers of the 1990s and 2000s."

In 1998, Fischer, who previously won the Guldbagge for best cinematography, was the recipient of the first George Eastman prize at the Guldebaggen. Among other recent projects, he was a cinematographer along with Eric Kress on the 2010 film The Girl With the Dragon Tattoo. At the 15th Pune International Film Festival (PIFF) in 2017, he served as a judge for the competition section.

At the 28th Guldbagge Awards in 2014 he was nominated for the award for Best Cinematography for the films Svart Lucia and House of Angels. At the 29th Guldbagge Awards he won the Best Cinematography award for the film Sista dansen. He has worked on more than 35 films and television shows since 1972.

== Selected filmography ==
- The Children of Noisy Village (1986)
- Allra käraste syster (1988)
- Ingen rövare finns i skogen (1988)
- Svart Lucia (1992)
- House of Angels (1992)
- Sista dansen (1993)
- The Queen of Sheba's Pearls (2004)
- Göta kanal 2 – Kanalkampen (2006)
- Göta kanal 3: Kanalkungens hemlighet (2009)
- Änglagård – tredje gången gillt (2010)
