= Anton Lundqvist =

Swedish actor (born 1989)

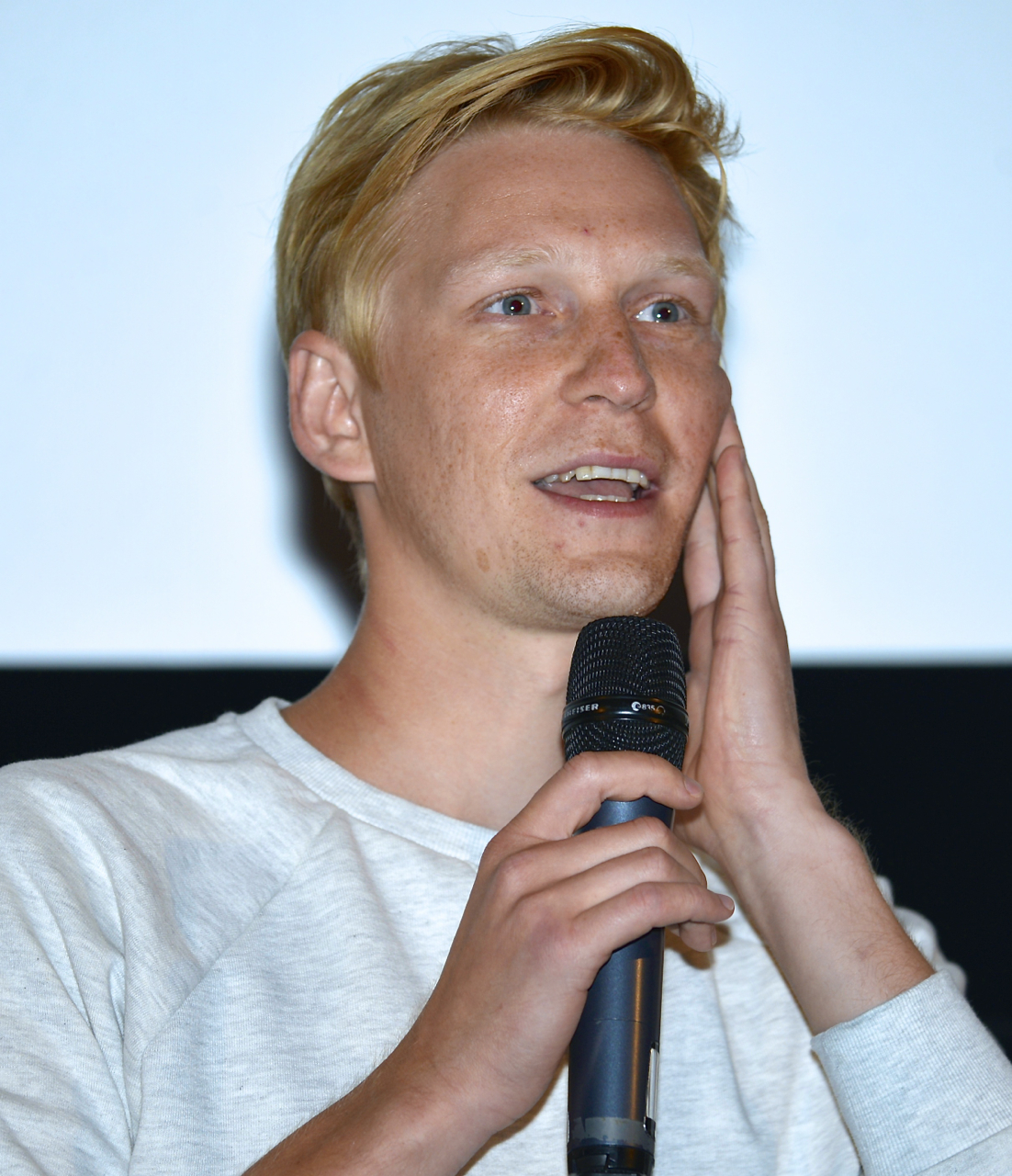
- Lundqvist in 2014
- Born: 16 September 1989 (age 35); Gothenburg, Sweden
- Occupation(s): Actor, singer
- Years active: 2005–present

Anton Bengtsson Lundqvist (born 16 September 1989) is a Swedish actor. He has played in several musicals such as Romeo & Julia and Blodsbröder. He has also presented a web-show for Allsång på Skansen. In 2015 he played the part of "Oscar" in the film En underbar jävla jul opposite his actress mother Maria Lundqvist.

== Early life ==
Born in Gothenburg, Anton Lundqvist is the son of actors Mikael Bengtsson and Maria Lundqvist, and is the oldest of four children.

== Career ==
Lundqvist plays the leading role of "Erik" in the 2005 film Kim Novak badade aldrig i Genesarets sjö. In 2010 he played the role of "Rolle" in the Swedish version of the musical Grease at the Göta Lejon theatre in Stockholm. He has also performed the role of "Gavroche" in the play Les Misérables Scandinavian Tour alongside singer Carola Häggkvist.

In 2011, Lundqvist played the part of "Mercutio" in the musical Romeo & Julia at Göta Lejon. In the summer of 2011 he presented the web-broadcast of the SVT sing-along show Allsång på Skansen. He did the presenting for one season in 2012; he was replaced by actor Robert Rydberg. In 2011 and 2012, he participated in the SVT show Gäster med gester. In December 2012 Lundqvist played the leading role in the play Peter Pan och Wendy at the Stockholm City Theatre. In 2013 he acted in the musical Blodsbröder along with actor Albin Flinkas. In 2014 he played the leading role in the film about Krakel Spektakel.

In 2015, Lundqvist played the part of "Oscar" in the film En underbar jävla jul, opposite his real-life mother, Maria Lundqvist. In the film he plays a homosexual man who invites his family for Christmas Eve celebration to tell them about him and his partner's planned surrogacy with their best friend.

Lundqvist is a friend of singer and Eurovision winner Måns Zelmerlöw.

== Filmography ==
- 2005 – Kim Novak badade aldrig i Genesarets sjö
- 2011 – Arthur och julklappsrushen
- 2013 – Förtroligheten
- 2014 – Krakel Spektakel
- 2015 – I nöd eller lust
- 2015 – En underbar jävla jul
- 2015 – The Bridge
