= Sagan om Karl-Bertil Jonssons julafton =

1975 Swedish animated TV film directed by Per Åhlin

- Release poster
- Written by: Tage Danielsson
- Directed by: Per Åhlin
- Starring: Tage Danielsson; Per Andrén; Toivo Pawlo; Marianne Stjernqvist; Åke Fridell; Catrin Westerlund
- Narrated by: Tage Danielsson
- Country of origin: Sweden
- Original language: Swedish

Production
- Producers: Lance H. Robbins; Cheryl Saban
- Cinematography: Thomas L. Callaway
- Running time: 23 minutes

Original release
- Network: TV1
- Release: 24 December 1975

Sagan om Karl-Bertil Jonssons julafton (lit. 'The Tale of Karl-Bertil Jonsson's Christmas Eve'), also known as Christopher's Christmas Mission, is a 1975 Swedish animated short film and television film directed by Per Åhlin, adapted from Tage Danielsson's short story of the same name, telling the tale of a boy who steals Christmas gifts from the wealthy to give to the poor people of Stockholm while working in a post office on Christmas Eve. The short story is also published in English with drawings by Per Åhlin by Trollboken AB 2018. The film has gained huge popularity in Sweden, and is broadcast every Christmas Eve on Swedish and Norwegian national television. It is also often shown on Christmas Eve by FST in Finland.

The film was dubbed into English in 1987, with Bernard Cribbins as the voice-over.

== Plot ==
14-year-old Karl-Bertil Jonsson lives with his father Tyko and his mother Mrs Jonsson. Karl-Bertil works at the Swedish postal service, sorting and delivering items. One Christmas Eve, Karl-Bertil, who highly admires Robin Hood, secretly decides to sort Christmas presents addressed to rich people into a separate bag and instead deliver them to many different poor people. After being asked by Mrs Jonsson about a porcelain plate meant for Tyko that had been delivered to another family, he decides to be open and honest to his parents about what he has done. This makes Mrs Jonsson cry and makes Tyko seriously upset at him, calling him a communist and sending him to bed early that night. The next day Tyko forces Karl-Bertil to visit all the people whose presents he had misdelivered to apologise. When he and Tyko visit these rich people the following day, they are met with positive reactions from everyone. Karl-Bertil is eventually celebrated as a hero by the various negatively-affected people by being tossed into the air in the midst of cries of ”hip hip hooray”. The short film ends with Tyko proclaiming Karl-Bertil a good person.

== Cast ==
- Tage Danielsson as narrator
- Per Andrén as Karl-Bertil Jonsson
- Toivo Pawlo as Tyko Jonsson, Karl-Bertil's father
- Marianne Stjernqvist as Mrs Jonsson, Karl-Bertil's mother
- Åke Fridell as H.K. Bergdahl
- Catrin Westerlund as Mrs Bergdahl

== Background and production ==
The film is an adaptation of the short story of the same title in Tage Danielsson's 1964 book Sagor för barn över 18 år (lit. "Fairy tales for children over 18 years old"). Commissioned by Sveriges Television, it was made into an animated film by Per Åhlin in 1975.

The story appears to take place sometime between 1942 and 1944, with details such as wood gas cars, the slogan En svensk tiger and the sight of a Nazi flag on a car, but the film features several anachronisms. Karl-Bertil and his father watch television, which was not introduced in Sweden until the 1950s, a glimpse of a television show that premiered in 1971 is seen, and one of the Christmas presents Karl-Bertil gives away includes Jean-Paul Sartre's book Les Mots, which was first published in 1963. It has been suggested that, rather than mistakes, these anachronisms are fully intentional to emphasize the timelessness of the story.

== Criticism ==
Debate about the tale's morality has arisen in Sweden every few years since SVT started broadcasting it annually, with critics arguing that it is too political and that stealing is not really part of the traditional Christmas spirit, while others defend the story. Danielsson himself found too-serious analysis of the tale embarrassing.

== See also ==
- List of Christmas films
