= Jakten på tidskristallen =

- Country of origin: Sweden
- Original language: Swedish
- No. of seasons: 1

Production
- Production company: SVT

Original release
- Release: 1 December – 24 December 2017

Related
- Selmas saga (2016); Storm på Lugna gatan (2018)

Jakten på tidskristallen (The hunt for the time crystal) is the Sveriges Television's Christmas calendar for 2017. It is an adaptation of the book trilogy Speglarnas hemlighet by Erika Vallin.

For Rikard Wolff, the series became his final role, as he died on November 17 the same year.

== Cast ==
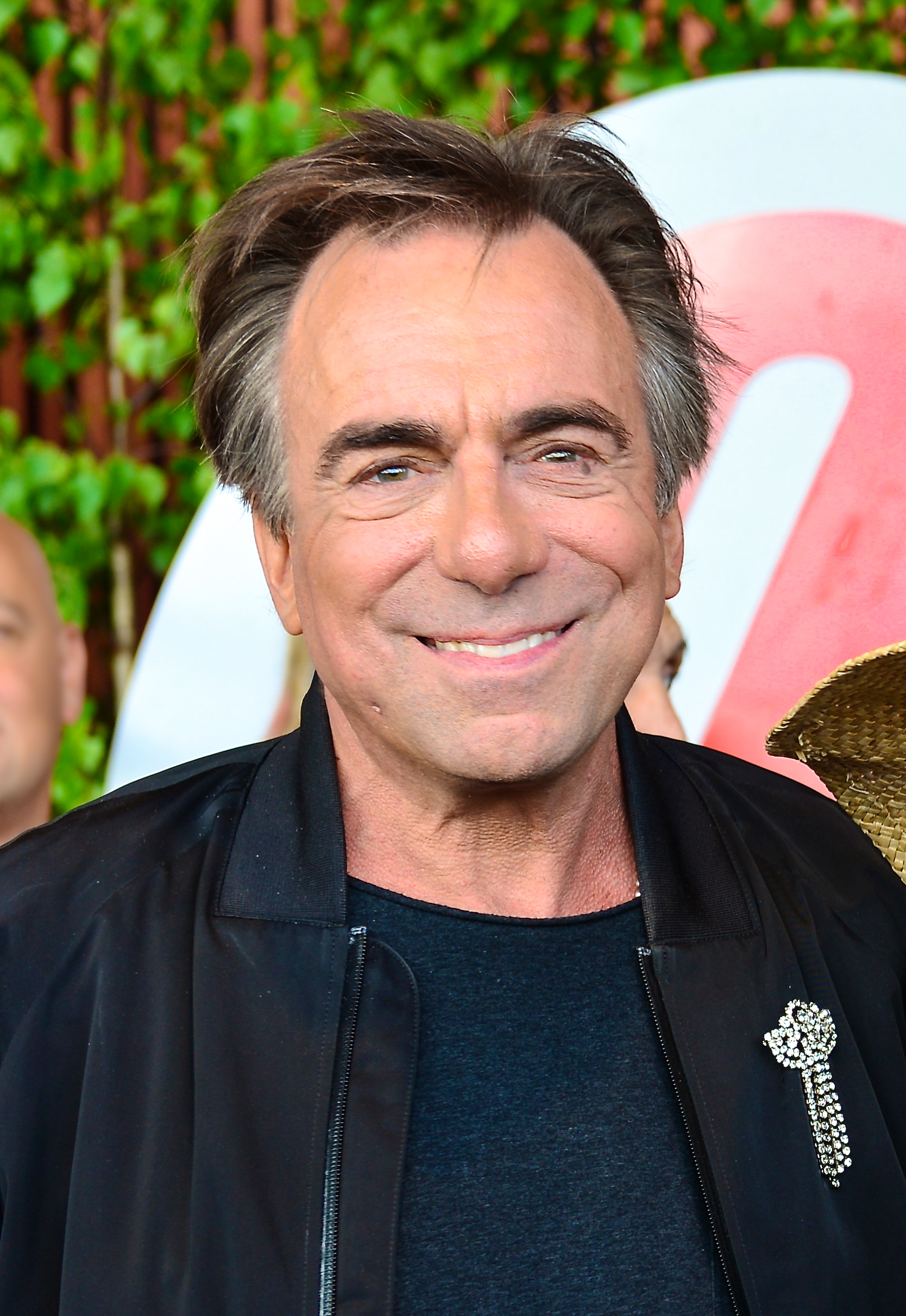
The series became Rikard Wolff's final role before his death.

- Eva Rydberg – Professor Siv Styregaard
- Monna Orraryd – Asrin
- Vincent Wettergren – Max
- Naima Palmaer – Lima
- Rikard Wolff – Dr Ruben
- Klas Wiljergård – Lucas
- Felice Jankell – Fiona
- Fredde Granberg – Gert
- Kodjo Akolor – Limas Pappa
- Julia Ragnarsson – Amalia
- Sissela Benn – Limas mamma
- David Wiberg – Vaktchefen
- Bianca Kronlöf
- Patrik Elgh – Jungle monster
