= Holy Mess =

- Directed by: Helena Bergström
- Written by: Edward af Sillén; Daniel Réhn; Helena Bergström
- Produced by: Petra Jönsson
- Starring: Maria Lundqvist; Robert Gustafsson; Anastasios Soulis
- Cinematography: Peter Mokrosinski
- Edited by: Tess Lindberg
- Music by: Per Andréasson
- Production company: Sweetwater Production AB
- Distributed by: Svensk Filmindustri
- Release date: 13 November 2015 (Sweden)
- Country: Sweden
- Language: Swedish

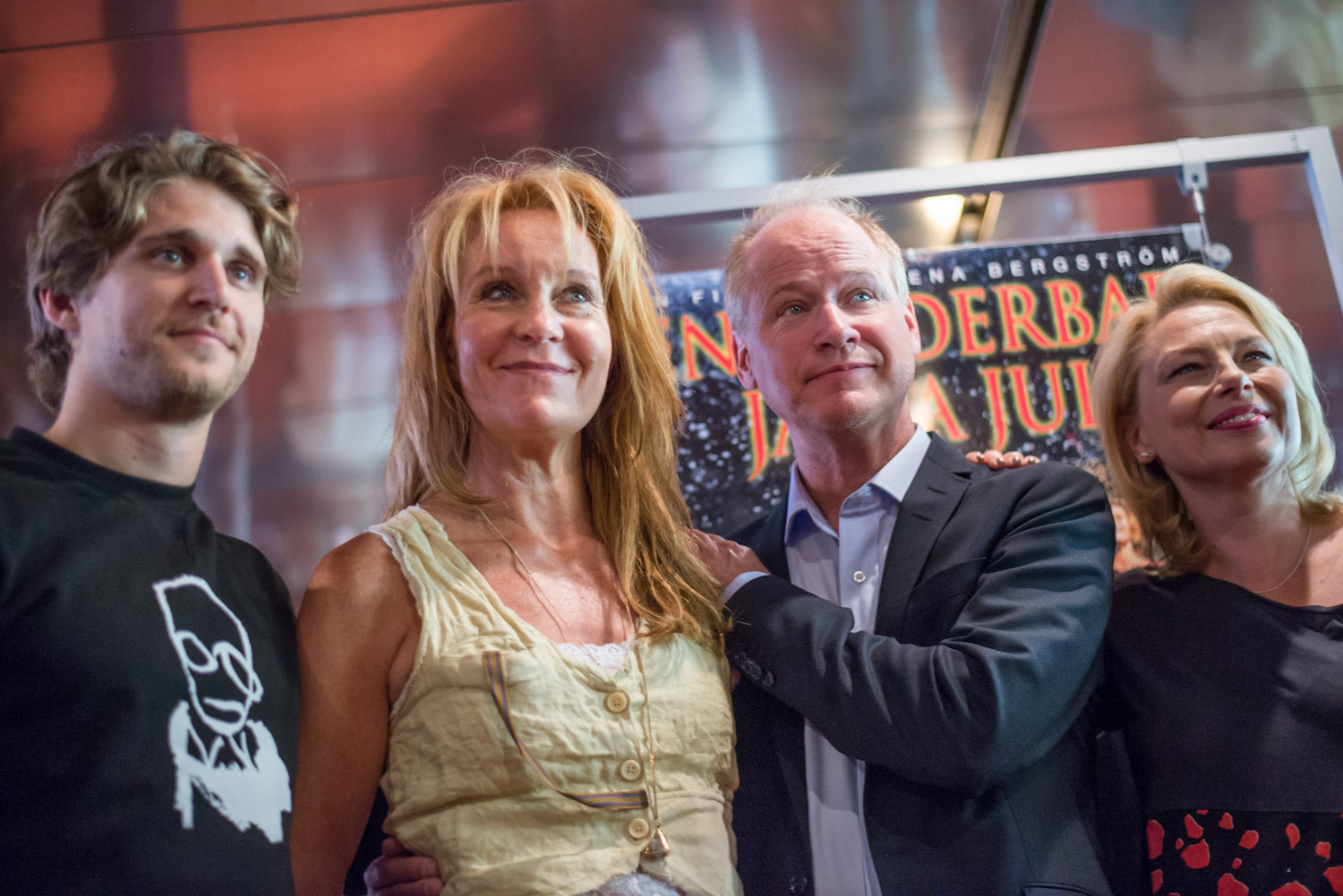
Anastasios Soulis, Maria Lundqvist, Robert Gustafsson and Helena Bergström at the presentation of En underbar jävla jul in 2015.

Holy Mess (Swedish: En underbar jävla jul) is a Swedish comedy film which premiered on 13 November 2015. The film is directed by Helena Bergström who also wrote the script along with Edward af Sillén and Daniel Réhn. The film shows how relations become strained at Christmas Eve celebrations in a modern Swedish family.

== Plot ==
The film is centering around Simon (Anastasios Soulis) and Oscar (Anton Lundqvist), a gay couple that is expecting a child along with their close friend Cissi (Rakel Wärmländer). The problem is that their respective families don't know about this pregnancy yet, and what better time to tell their families than Christmas Eve.

== Roles ==
- Maria Lundqvist – Monica
- Robert Gustafsson – Ulf
- Anastasios Soulis – Simon
- Anton Lundqvist – Oscar
- Rakel Wärmländer – Cissi
- Michalis Koutsogiannakis – Millitiadis
- Inga Landgré – Gunn-Britt
- Helena Bergström – Carina
- Kajsa Ernst – Annica
- Peshang Rad – Rami
- Gustav Levin – Håkan
- Frida Beckman – Sofia
- Neo Siambalis – Alex
- Paulina Pizarro Swartling – Ebba
- Rikard Wolff – julvärd
- Kerstin Widgren – Lady in the Subway sandwich store

== Remake ==
A Finnish remake of the film was released in 2022 under the title Kulkuset kulkuset.

== See also ==
- List of Christmas films
