= Peter Andersson (actor) =

Swedish actor (born 1953)

- Born: Ulf Harry Peter Andersson; 12 February 1953 (age 73); Gothenburg, Sweden
- Occupation: Actor
- Years active: 1983–present

Ulf Harry Peter Andersson (born 12 February 1953) is a Swedish actor, famous in Denmark for his role as gang kingpin The Faroese in the 2000 film Flickering Lights, he came to international prominence for his portrayal of predatory attorney Nils Bjurman in the 2009 film The Girl with the Dragon Tattoo.

== Early life ==
He was born on 12 February 1953 in Masthugget, Gothenburg.

== Career ==
He played a retired professor in An Honest Life (2025), which earned him praise from Wanda Bendjelloul in Dagens Nyheter. His performance was also described as phenomenal in Göteborgs-Posten.

== Filmography ==
Film
Year	Title	Role	Notes
1988	Jungfruresan	Leif	
1988	Venus 90	Peter O.	
1991	Freud Leaving Home	Adrian	
1992	House of Angels	Ragnar Zetterberg	
1993	Sista dansen	Lennart Waltner	
1994	House of Angels – The Second Summer	Ragnar Zetterberg	
1995	Älskar älskar inte	Henrik	
1995	Passageraren	Passenger	
1996	Pusher	Hasse	
1996	Kalle Blomkvist - Mästerdetektiven lever farligt	Polisinspektör Strand	
1997	Spring för livet	Kriminalinspektören	
1999	Zero Tolerance	Leo Gaut	
2000	Flickering Lights	Færingen (The Faroese)	
2000	Gossip	Tomas Berg	
2001	Deadline	The Source	
2003	Daybreak	Olof	
2005	Carambole	Pieter Clausen	
2005	Mouth to Mouth	Mats / Vera's father	
2008	The Kautokeino Rebellion	Lars Johan Bucht	
2009	The Girl with the Dragon Tattoo	Nils Bjurman	
2009	The Girl Who Played with Fire	Nils Bjurman	
2009	The Girl Who Kicked the Hornets' Nest	Nils Bjurman	
2011	Happy End	Mårten	
2011	Någon annanstans i Sverige	Ove	
2011	Arme Riddere	Lasse	
2012	Hamilton: In the Interest of the Nation	Staffan Wärnman	
2012	The Last Sentence	Christian Günther	
2013	Ego	Göran	
2014	Jack Ryan: Shadow Recruit	Dimitri Lemkov	
2014	In Order of Disappearance	Wingman - Egil Dickman	
2014	Flugparken	Berndt	
2015	Jordskott	Gustaf Borén	10 episodes
2015	The Vatican Tapes	Cardinal Bruun	
2016	Underworld: Blood Wars	Vidar	
2018	Innan vintern kommer	Soldier	
2019	Quick	Jan Olsson	
2020	Orca	Allan	
2023	Estonia	Jörgen Berglund	6 episodes
2025	An Honest Life	Charles	
