= Helena Bergström =

Swedish actress (born 1964)

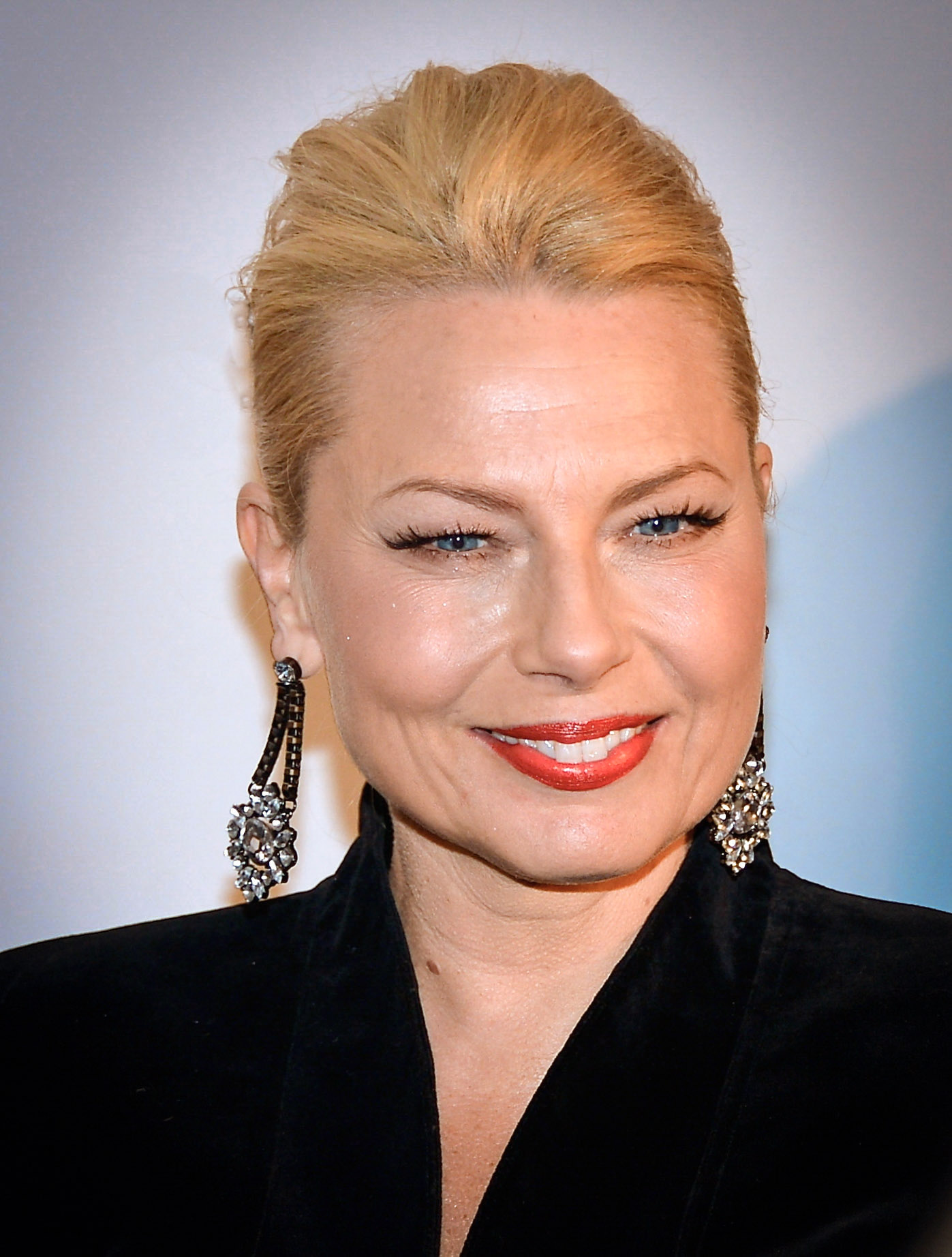
- Bergström in 2013
- Born: Helena Kristina Bergström; 5 February 1964 (age 62); Gothenburg, Sweden
- Occupations: Actress, director
- Years active: 1988–present
- Spouse: Colin Nutley
- Children: Molly, Timothy
- Parent(s): Hans Bergström; Kerstin Widgren
- Relatives: Olof Widgren (grandfather)

Helena Kristina Bergström Nutley (Swedish pronunciation: [hɛˈlêːna ˈbæ̂rjstrœm]; born 5 February 1964) is a Swedish actress and film director. From an acting family, she began her career in 1982. She has appeared on the stages of the Royal Dramatic Theatre (Dramaten) and the Stockholm City Theatre, but is best known for her work in films. The Women on the Roof is considered a breakout role for her. Her most awarded film is The Last Dance, for which she received the Guldbagge Award for Best Actress in a Leading Role and Festival Awards in Montreal and Istanbul. Her husband, Colin Nutley, has directed her in several movies. In 2007, she directed for the first time for the film Mind the Gap. She is also a screenwriter and a singer.

== Early and personal life ==
Bergström was born in Kortedala, Gothenburg, the daughter of actress Kerstin Widgren and Hans Bergström, a director and actor. Her maternal grandfather, Olof Widgren, was also an actor.

Bergström studied in Mississippi in the United States as an exchange student when she was a teenager.

She is married to Colin Nutley, with whom she has two children, Molly and Timothy, and a stepson, Daniel Nutley. They met while filming Blackjack. At the time, Nutley was married and was 20 years her senior. They live in an apartment on Kungsholmen, an island in central Stockholm, where her grandparents lived. They also have a house in the country.

== Career ==
She first appeared in a movie directed by her father in 1978, entitled Sweet Home. Bergström embarked on a film career in 1982, working in the television mini-series "Time Out". A year later she appeared in the satirical comedy series Vidöppet, or Wide Open in English. In 1988, she graduated from "Teaterhögskolan", the theatre academy, in Stockholm, after which she worked at the Royal Dramatic Theatre and at the Stockholm City Theatre.

In 2008, she starred in a drama about Nobel Prize-winning author Selma Lagerlöf. She is known for her work in films, such as Miss Julie and House of Angels. The Woman on the Roof is described as the role that made her a noted actress. Although it was not a box office success, it was praised by the film critics. She became more notable after her "vivid portrayal of a tough city girl" during World War II in 1939. In 1990, she received the Swedish Film Academy Kurt Linder scholarship, and in 1992 Teaterförbundet Daniel Engdahl scholarship.

She has been directed by her husband in films including Black Jack, House of Angels, The Last Dance. Her husband has directed Bergström in films involving sex scenes; she said he found this to be uncomfortable.

With Tove Alsterdal, a playwright and journalist, she wrote her first screenplay, Så olika (2009), or So Different in English. She first directed Mind the Gap , which was released in 2007. In 2015, she directed her fourth film, Holy Mess (Swedish: En underbar jävla jul) She is also a singer, singing more than 100 songs of Édith Piaf at the City Theatre. In 2002, she recorded an album of Piaf songs.

== Filmography ==
| Year | Swedish title | English title | Role | Award |
|---|---|---|---|---|
| 1982 | Time Out | Time Out (TV series) | actor | |
| 1983 | Vidöppet (TV series) | Wide Open (TV series) | actor | |
| 1987 | Uppvaknandet | The Awakening | actor | |
| 1988 | Friends | Friends | actor | |
| 1989 | Husbonden (TV series) | The Master | actor | |
| 1989 | Kvinnorna på taket | The Women on the Roof | actor | |
| 1989 | 1939 | 1939 | actor | |
| 1990 | Black Jack | Blackjack | actor | |
| 1992 | Änglagård | House of Angels | actor | Nominated for Guldbagge Award for Best Actress and Prize (Stockholm) |
| 1993 | Pariserhjulet | The Ferris Wheel | actor | Guldbagge Award for Best Actress |
| 1993 | Sista dansen | The Last Dance | actor | Guldbagge Award for Best Actress and Festival Award (Montreal, Istanbul) |
| 1994 | Änglagård – andra sommaren | House of Angels – The Second Summer | actor | |
| 1996 | Jägarna | The Hunters | actor | |
| 1996 | Sånt är livet | Such Is Life | actor | |
| 1998 | Under solen | Under the Sun | actor | |
| 1998 | Still Crazy | Still Crazy | actor | |
| 2000 | Livet är en schlager | Once in a Lifetime | actor | |
| 2001 | Sprängaren | Deadline | actor | Nominated for Guldbagge Award for Best Actress |
| 2002 | Mrs Klein (TV) | Mrs. Klein (TV) | actor | |
| 2003 | Paradiset | Paradise | actor | |
| 2004 | The Queen of Sheba's Pearls | The Queen of Sheba's Pearls | actor | |
| 2005 | Fordringsägare | Creditors | actor | |
| 2006 | Heartbreak Hotel | Heartbreak Hotel | actor | Festival Award (Festroia) |
| 2007 | Se upp för dårarna | Mind the Gap | director | |
| 2008 | Angel | Angel | actor | |
| 2008 | Ernst-Hugo | Ernst-Hugo | actor | |
| 2008 | Selma (TV) | Selma (TV) | actor | |
| 2009 | Så olika | So Different | screenwriter, director | |
| 2010 | Änglagård – tredje gången gillt | Angels – Third Time Lucky | actor | |
| 2011 | Någon annanstans i Sverige | Somewhere Else | actor | Nomination - Guldbagge Award for Best Actress - Supporting role |
| 2013 | Julie | Julie | director | |
| 2014 | Medicinen | Medicine | actor | |
| 2014 | Den fjärde mannen | The Fourth Man | actor | |
| 2015 | En underbar jävla jul | A Holy Mess | screenwriter, actor | |
| 2017 | Vilken jävla cirkus | Mending Hugo's Heart | screenwriter, director | |
| 2021 | Dancing Queens | Dancing Queens | director | |
| 2022, 2024 | Bäckström | Bäckström | actor | |
