= Jacques Werup =

Swedish musician, author, poet, stage artist and screenwriter (1945-2016)

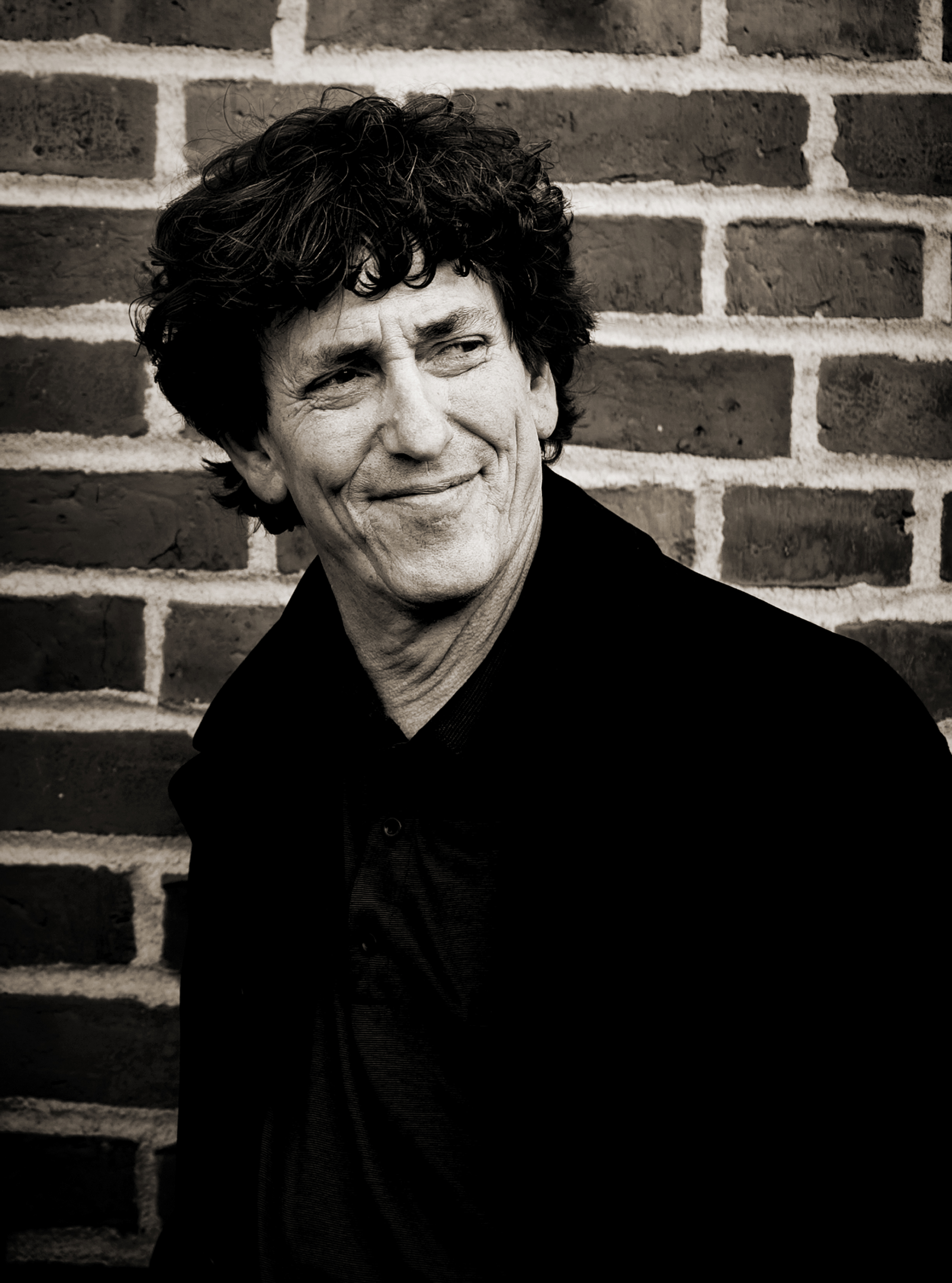
- Born: 14 January 1945
- Died: 12 November 2016 (aged 71)
- Occupation(s): musician, author, poet, stage artist and screenwriter
- Years active: 1971–2016

Jacques Werup (14 January 1945 – 12 November 2016) was a Swedish musician, author, poet, stage artist and screenwriter, born in Malmö. Werup's poetry is often associated to jazz. He was a childhood friend of Mikael Wiehe and Göran Skytte and had his first novel published in 1971. He has co-written many songs with long-time collaborator and composer Michael Saxell for various projects including Gör mig lite levande which is a CD and nationwide stage show with Swedish singer Lill Lindfors and En känsla av ljus, which is a concert Werup and Saxell wrote and performed with Mats Ronander and Benneth Fagerlund. Werup lived in Ystad.

In 1997 Werup got the Ferlinpriset together with Ola Magnell, and was 2003 awarded a scholarship by the Swedish Royal Academy. Was also awarded Litteraturfrämjandets stora romanpris in 1980.

== Bibliography ==
- Returbiljett Polen (1971)
- Ett å... Två å... Tre å... Fyr! (1971)
- Streber (1972)
- Tiden i Malmö, på jorden (1974)
- Swiss Made (1975)
- Fläckar av liv (1977)
- Casanovas senare resor (1979)
- 48 dikter från Österlen (1980)
- Hemstaden (1981)
- Den skräddarsydda sorgen (1982)
- L'heure bleue (1983)
- Shimonoffs längtan (1983)
- Mellan rotfrukt och måne (1983)
- Boulevarder och fågelsträck (interpretations) (1984)
- Vem är Nora Prentiss? (1984)
- Från dörren till hemligheten (1985)
- Handbagage (1986)
- Den sjungande kroppen (1986)
- Ett steg på de älskandes ö (tolkningar) (1986)
- Stjärnan i periferin (1987)
- Pornografens död (1988)
- Den elektroniska synden (1989)
- I ögonhöjd (1990)
- Septemberljus (1990)
- Den sjungande kroppen (prose version, with Madeleine Pyk) (1986)
- Dikter (1991)
- 42 minuter från Paris (1992)
- Det omvända skriket (interpretations) (1992)
- Ängeln på Rue de la Lune (Bonniers Christmas book) (1992)
- Aptiten och ledan (1994)
- Den ofullbordade himlen (1996)
- Det stora preludiet (1997)
- Människan är vem som helst (1998)
- Hemmavid (1999)
- Oldboy (2000)
- Herbarium (med Georg Oddner) (2000)
- Lev länge, dö ung (2001)
- Livet går fort, timmarna sakta (2001)
- Provliv 1–10 (2002)
- Hundra dikter (2005)
- Levande tillsammans (2006)
- Trötta mäns skönhet (2008)
- Medan jag levde (2011)
- Du har funnits här – poesi på liv och död (2015)
- Restaurangmusik/Spilla (2017)

In addition:

- Gör mig lite levande
- Ljudet av rullande stenar
- Året då natten var kort

== Film scripts and TV scripts ==
- 2001 – Så vit som en snö
- 1972 – N.P. Möller, fastighetsskötare

== Prizes and awards ==
- Litteraturfrämjandets stora romanpris 1980
- PiratenPriset 1989
- Lengertz litteraturpris 1991
- De Nios Vinterpris 1996
- Ferlinpriset 1997
- De Nios stora pris 2006

== See also ==
- Gunnar Harding
