= Under the Sun (1998 film) =

1998 film

- Swedish cover
- Directed by: Colin Nutley
- Written by: H. E. Bates (novel); Johanna Hald
- Starring: Rolf Lassgård; Helena Bergström; Johan Widerberg
- Distributed by: AB Svensk Filmindustri
- Release date: 25 December 1998 (Sweden)
- Running time: 118 minutes
- Country: Sweden
- Language: Swedish

Under the Sun (Swedish: Under solen) is a Swedish film which was released to cinemas in Sweden on 25 December 1998, directed by Colin Nutley, adapted from the short story The Little Farm by H. E. Bates. The film stars Rolf Lassgård, Helena Bergström (who is married to director Nutley), and Johan Widerberg. Set in Sweden in the mid-1950s, the film was nominated for the 1999 Academy Award for Best Foreign Language Film.

== Plot ==
The film begins with a voice-over quotation of a verse from the Book of Ecclesiastes, which includes the language, "for every thing there is a season, and a time for every purpose under heaven."

After the death of his mother over a decade ago, Olof (Rolf Lassgård), an illiterate farmer, lives alone on his family farm. Olof can't read, so his young friend Erik (Johan Widerberg)—who has been a sailor and claims to have known various American celebrities while staying in the United States and to have bedded hundreds of women—handles all the business of the farm. One day, Olof puts out an ad for a woman in a local newspaper, asking applicants to include a photograph. The beautiful woman from outside the village responds; Ellen (Helena Bergstrom).

As Ellen takes over more and more of the business of the farm, the farmer and the newcomer fall in love. Erik becomes convinced she is a gold-digger who is after Olof's money. Erik and Ellen quarrel, and Erik threatens to 'find out where you come from and who you are.' When he does find out that Ellen is married, he implies to Ellen that he will expose her.

Ellen leaves the farm, leaving behind a note to Olof in which she discloses that she is already married, and apologizes for having "betrayed his trust." She says she must go back and "sort things out" and closes by saying that she will always love Olof. Olof asks Erik to read the note to him. At first, Erik refuses. When he does read the note, he alters the text by inserting a sentence saying that Erik has repaid some money he borrowed from Olof, and that Ellen has taken the payments for herself. He also omits Ellen's declaration of eternal love for Olof.

Erik then announces he is going back to sea, on the SS Andrea Doria, and departs. The ship that later the same year collided with M/S Stockholm, and 49 people died.

Some time passes, and one day in the fall (the characters are wearing coats and Olof is bird hunting) when Olof is on a road, a passing car stops, and from it steps Ellen. Olof has Ellen's note with him and asks that she read it to him, confessing for the first time that he cannot read. Ellen reads the note and asks if Olof wants her back. The two are reunited, and the film ends.

== Cast ==
- Rolf Lassgård as Olof
- Helena Bergström as Ellen Lind
- Johan Widerberg as Erik Jonsson
- Gunilla Röör as Newspaper Receptionist
- Jonas Falk as Preacher
- Linda Ulvaeus as Lena
- Bergljót Arnadóttir as Shop assistant
- Per Sandberg as Undertaker

== Reception ==
=== Critical response ===
Under the Sun has an approval rating of 74% on review aggregator website Rotten Tomatoes, based on 34 reviews, and an average rating of 6.6/10. The website's critical consensus states: "A modest and touching story about first love". Metacritic assigned the film a weighted average score of 60 out of 100, based on 18 critics, indicating "mixed or average reviews".

== See also ==
- List of submissions to the 72nd Academy Awards for Best Foreign Language Film
- List of Swedish submissions for the Academy Award for Best Foreign Language Film
