= Maria Lundqvist =

Swedish actress and comedian

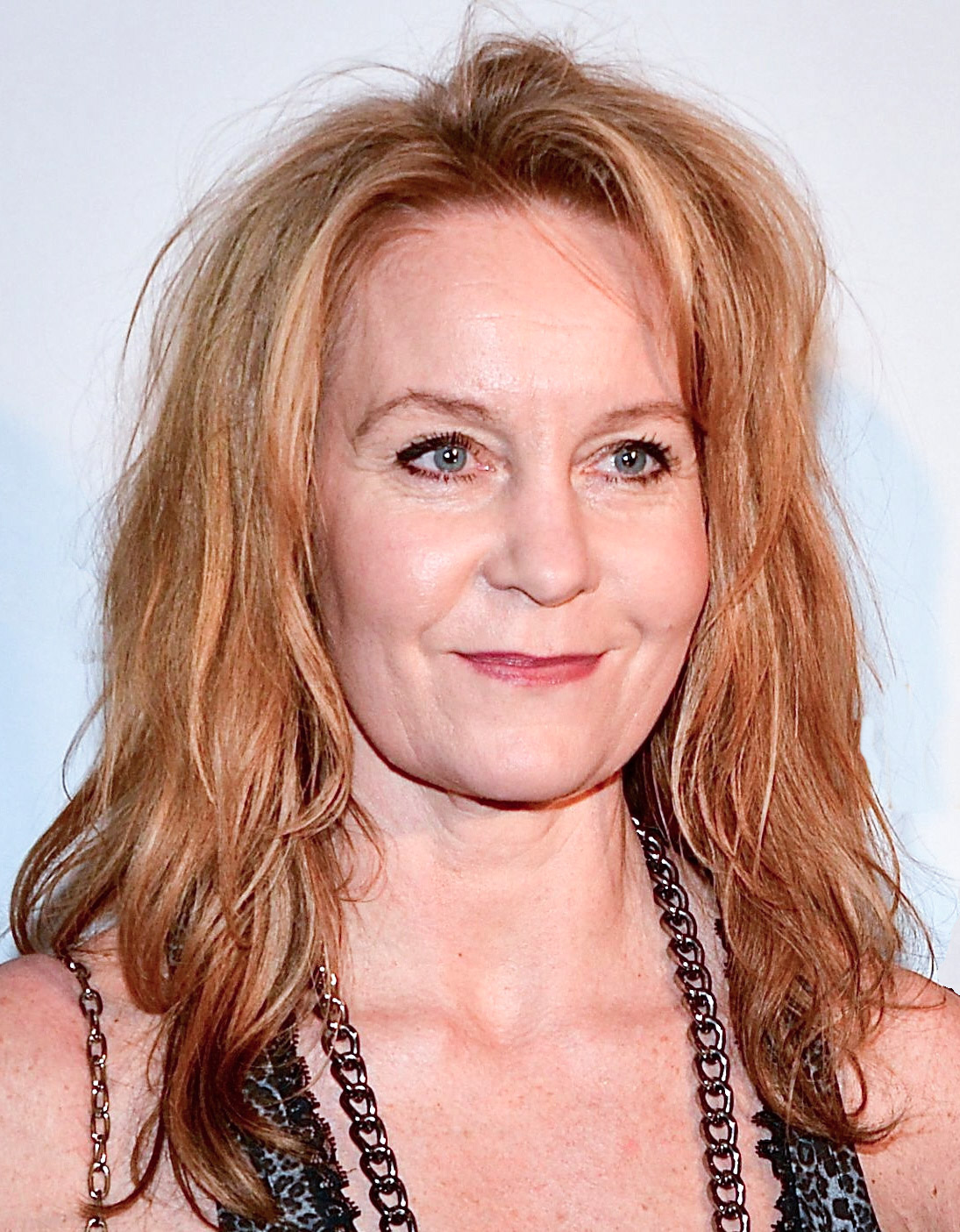
- Lundqvist in 2013
- Born: Annika Maria Lundqvist; 14 October 1963 (age 62); Gothenburg, Sweden
- Occupations: Actress; comedian
- Years active: 1986–present
- Partner(s): Mikael Bengtsson (1986–2010); Kristoffer Hellström (2010–)
- Children: 4, including Anton Lundqvist

Annika Maria Lundqvist (born 14 October 1963) is a Swedish actress and comedian.

Annika Maria Lundqvist was born on 14 October 1963 in Västra Frölunda, a borough of Gothenburg. Lundqvist studied acting at the Gothenburg Theatre Academy and has since been acting at various Swedish theatres, including the Royal Dramatic Theatre in Stockholm.

Her breakthrough as a comedian came when she portrayed a comic character named Sally in a TV-show with the same name in 1998. She has also starred in musicals in Sweden.

She had a major role in Involuntary (2008).

For her film acting, she has received two Guldbagge awards. She had a leading role in the 2015 comedy film En underbar jävla jul.

She has four children, one of them is actor Anton Lundqvist.

== Selected filmography ==
Film
| Year | Title | Role | Notes |
|---|---|---|---|
| 2008 | Everlasting Moments | | |
| 2008 | Involuntary | | |
| 2005 | Mother of Mine | | |
| 2001 | Deadline | | |
