= Svart Lucia =

1992 film

- Film poster
- Directed by: Rumle Hammerich
- Written by: Carina Rydberg, Rumle Hammerich
- Produced by: Waldemar Bergendahl
- Cinematography: Jens Fischer
- Edited by: Camilla Skousen
- Music by: Jacob Groth
- Release date: 11 December 1992 (Sweden)
- Running time: 114 minutes
- Countries: Sweden, Denmark
- Language: Swedish
- Budget: SEK 14,500,000 (estimated)
- Box office: SEK 11,467,057 (Sweden)

Svart Lucia (lit. "Black Lucia" or "Black Saint Lucy's Day") is a Swedish-Danish film which was released to cinemas in Sweden on 11 December 1992, directed by Rumle Hammerich. At the 28th Guldbagge Awards Tova Magnusson Norling was nominated for the Best Actress award.

== Plot ==
Secondary school student Mikaela writes an erotic novel and gives it to her teacher.

== Cast ==
- Tova Magnusson-Norling as Mikaela Holm
- Figge Norling as Joakim
- Björn Kjellman as Max
- Liv Alsterlund as Sandra
- Malin Berghagen as Justine
- Niklas Hjulström as Johan
- Lars Green as Göran
- Agneta Ekmanner as Gunvor Holm
- Marie Göranzon as Birgitta
- Reine Brynolfsson as Spielman (the teacher)

and Thomas Roos, Catherine Hansson, Gunnel Fred, Josefin Ankarberg, Annmari Kastrup, Anna Godenius, Mattias Knave, Joakim Jennefors, W. Moses J. Bone, Frida Hallgren, Berit Palm, Caroline af Ugglas, Rumle Hammerich.
