= Young Andersen =

2005 Danish television serial

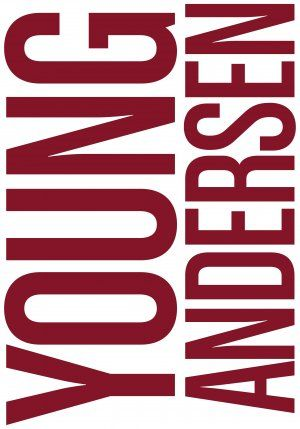
- Genre: Historical drama
- Written by: Rumle Hammerich; Ulf Stark
- Directed by: Rumle Hammerich
- Starring: Simon Dahl Thaulow
- Composer: Jacob Groth
- Country of origin: Denmark
- No. of episodes: 2

Production
- Executive producers: Erik Crone; Kim Magnusson
- Producer: Tina Dalhoff
- Production locations: Copenhagen, Denmark
- Cinematography: Nicolai Brüel
- Running time: 110 min
- Production companies: Nordisk Film; SVT; NRK

Original release
- Network: DR, SVT, NRK
- Release: 11 March 2005

Young Andersen (Danish: Unge Andersen) is a 2005 two-part Danish television serial directed by Rumle Hammerich and co-written by Hammerich and Ulf Stark. It chronicles the formative boarding school years of fairy tale writer Hans Christian Andersen and his subsequent arrival at Copenhagen where he struggles for success and recognition. It is produced principally by Nordisk Film, while additional production funding was provided by SVT and NRK.

== Cast ==
- Simon Dahl Thaulow as Hans Christian Andersen
- Peter Steen as the old Hans Christian Andersen
- Lars Brygmann as Jonas Collin
- Stine Fischer Christensen
- Annemarie Malle Klixbüll
- Søren Bertelsen
- Niels Hinrichsen
- Tuva Novotny
- Steen Stig Lommer
- Peter Hesse Overgaard
- Troels II Munk
- Gert Vindahl
- Nina Reventlow
- Mikkel Rosenberg

== Awards ==
Awards:

Year	Award	Category	Nominee	Result
2005	International Emmy Award	Best TV Movie/Mini-series	Young Andersen	Won
2005	Shanghai International Film Festival	Best director	Rumle Hammerich	Won
2005	Shanghai International Film Festival	Best Custom Design	Disa Persson	Won
2005	Shanghai International Film Festival	Best Film	Young Andersen	Nominated
2006	Danish Academy Awards	Best Costume Design	Manon Rasmussen	Won
2006	Danish Academy Awards	Best Make-Up	Anne Cathrine Sauerberg; Charlotte Laustsen	Nominated
