= Anna Lenah Elgström =

Swedish writer

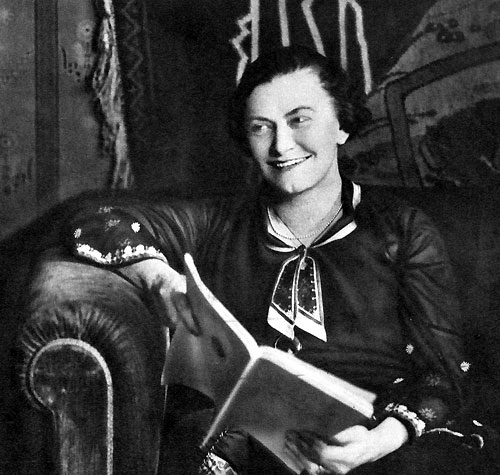
- Elgström in 1930
- Born: 29 December 1884; Helsingborg, Sweden
- Died: 23 December 1968 (aged 83); Stockholm, Sweden
- Occupation: Novelist
- Spouse: Gustaf Collijn
- Children: Ragnhild

Signature
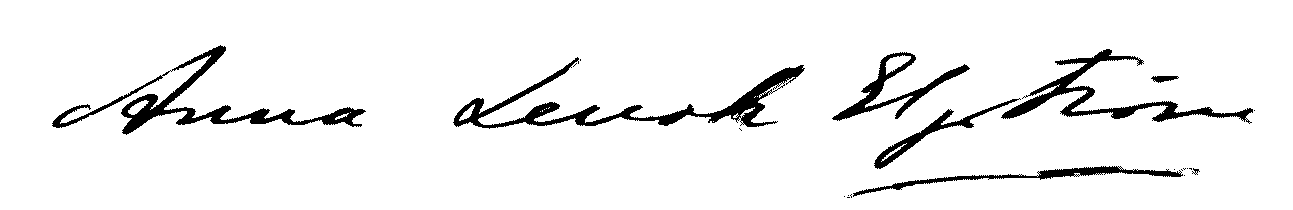

Anna Helena Maria "Anna Lenah" Elgström (29 December 1884 in Helsingborg – 23 December 1968 in Stockholm) was a Swedish author.

== Life and career ==
Elgström studied art in Stockholm and Paris and wrote in Social-Demokraten until 1948. She was Catholic and active in the women's and peace movement. She married in 1912 with the theatre director Gustaf Collijn, with whom she had a daughter, Ragnhild, circa 1914.

She debuted as an author in 1911 with the book "Gäster och främlingar" (Guests and Strangers) which was well received. During the First World War she was active as an anti-war author. Her most famous work is the "Den kloka Elsa" (The Clever Elsa) trilogy, which began in 1928, and told the story of the upbringing and development of a young woman by the name of Elsa Holm.

Elgström was one of the founders of Save the Children in 1919. She was the sister of Ossian Elgström and the aunt of Jörgen Elgström. She was a life-long catholic.

== Bibliography ==
- Gäster och främlingar [novel] (Åhlén & Åkerlund, 1911)
- Havsboken (Bonnier, 1912)
- Fattigfolk [novel] (Åhlén & Åkerlund, 1912)
- Stjärnan vars namn är malört: krönikor och berättelser (Bonnier, 1915)
- Den sjunde basunen (Tiden, 1915)
- En dröm (Svenska andelsförlaget, 1916)
- Mödrar [novel] (Bonnier, 1917). 7. uppl. 1938
- Dansk översättning: Mødre (1919)
- Nederländsk översättning: Moeders (1922)
- Den kinesiska muren: Rosika Schwimmers kamp för rätten och hennes krig mot kriget (Anna-Lenah Elgström, Frida Stéenhoff, Elin Wägner, Wilma Glücklich, Ellen Hagen, Mia Leche, Paula Pogany) (Dahlberg, 1917)
- Samtal och brev (Tiden, 1918)
- Martha och Maria [novel] (Bonnier, 1921)
- En romantikers hustru: roman (Åhlén & Åkerlund, 1922)
- Elfenbenstornet och andra reseskisser från Medelhavsländer (Bonnier, 1923)
- Myrstacken: ett vardagsäventyr [romance] (Bonnier, 1923)
- Äventyr: noveller (Bonnier, 1926)
- Revolutionsnoveller (Bonnier, 1926)
- U.S.A.: liv och teater (with Gustaf Collijn) (Bonnier, 1927)
- Den kloka Elsa [romance] (Bonnier, 1928)
- Elsa och kärleken: far och dotter (Bonnier, 1932)
- Noveller i urval (Bonnier, 1934)
- U. S. A. i örnens tecken (Bonnier, 1934)
- Hollywood inifrån (Åhlén & Åkerlund, 1934)
- Elsa i männens värld (Bonnier, 1936)
- Från år noll till tre: roman (Bonnier, 1938)
- Innan det blir för sent (Bonnier, 1940)
- Italiens elfte timma (Steinsvik, 1943)
- Tidens kvinnor (Steinsvik, 1944)
- De trogna: noveller (Bonnier, 1944)
- Spanien under Francos regim (Utrikespolitiska institutet, 1946)
- Ett fritt hjärta: valda noveller (Norstedt, 1946)
- Den målade öknen (Norstedt, 1948)
