= Rikard Wolff =

Swedish actor (1958–2017)

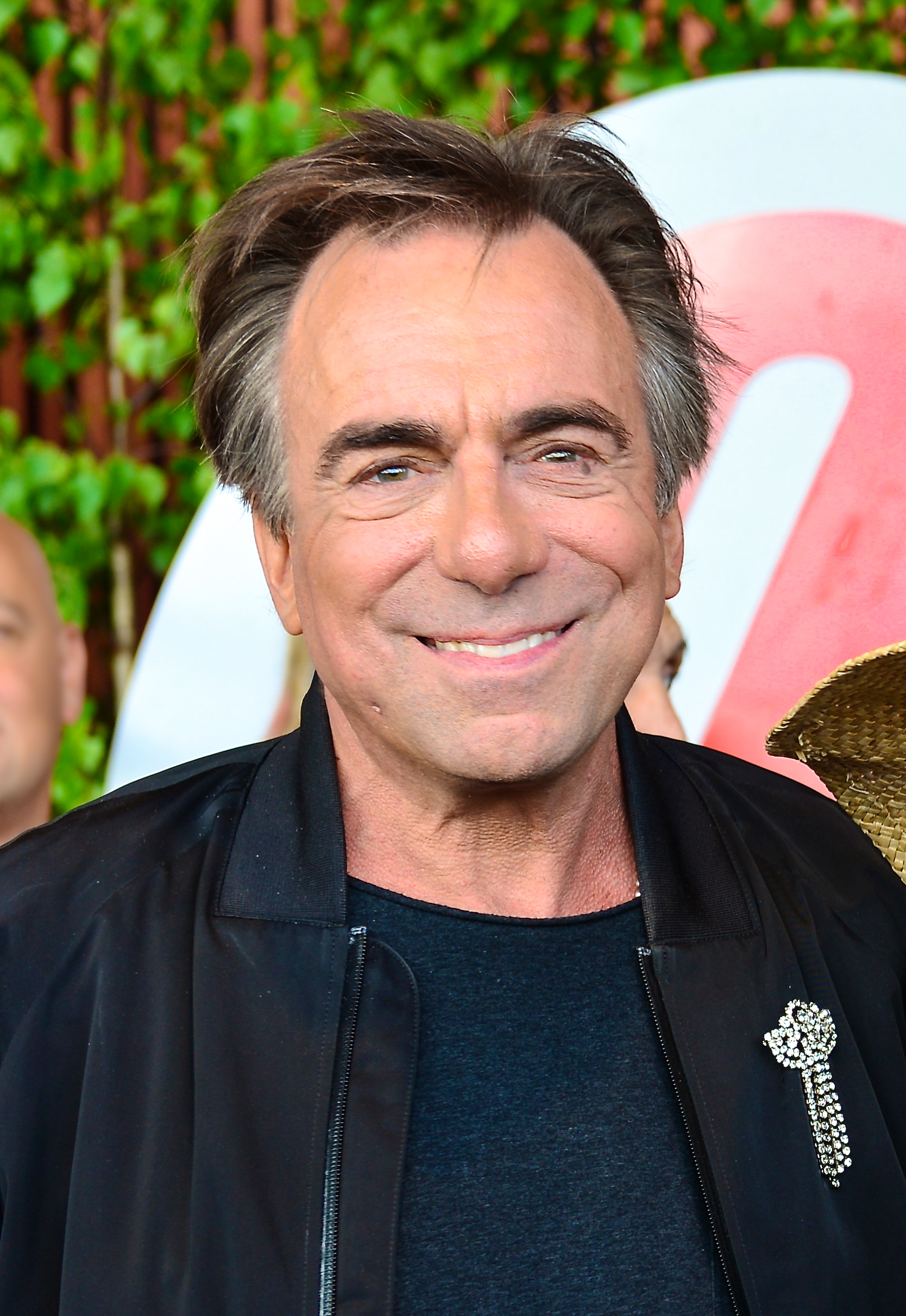
- Wolff in 2013
- Born: Jan Rikard Wolff; 8 April 1958; Farsta, Sweden
- Died: 17 November 2017 (aged 59); Stockholm, Sweden
- Occupations: Actor; singer
- Years active: 1980–2017
- Children: 1

Jan Rikard Wolff (8 April 1958 – 17 November 2017) was a Swedish actor and singer. His career included both film roles in House of Angels and its two sequels and theatre roles such as in Waiting for Godot at Royal Dramatic Theatre, and A Chorus Line at The Göteborg Opera. He was made a Knight of the Legion of Honour for his work with French music. He had also been awarded a Grammis, and received the Swedish Academy's 2017 prize for theatre, as well as a royal medal for his service as an actor.

In Sweden, he was also associated with voice-acting, most notably the Swedish voice for Scar in The Lion King.

== Life and career ==
Wolff grew up in Gubbängen in Farsta and moved to Karlstad at the age of ten. He started to study acting at Skara skolscen in 1978 and then began his professional career in the theatre group Vågspel in Södertälje. From 1980 to 1982, he worked at Teater Aurora, where he played the lead role in Friedrich Schiller's play Don Carlos. He toured with several successful song repertoires performing French chanson, with his inspirations Édith Piaf, Jacques Brel and Barbara.

Between 1984 and 1987, he studied at the Swedish National Academy of Mime and Acting in Malmö, where he came into contact with and started a co-operation with director Rickard Günther, which led to a role in the play Mefisto. During his study years he worked with Suzanne Osten in Affären Danton, and acted in Osten's directoral debut film, Lethal Film, in 1988. His role as the poet Paul Andersson in the television series Apelsinmannen led to his big breakthrough in the Swedish public in 1990.

The voice Scar in the Swedish dub of The Lion King was Wolff. He also starred in the movie House of Angels, and its two sequels, among other films. Wolff had also done various plays, such as Midsommarnatts Dröm (a Swedish version of A Midsummer Night's Dream), and solo acts such as Chanson Suicide and music tours.

His albums included Pojken på månen and Du får mig (om jag får dig).

Wolff took part in Melodifestivalen 2013 with the song "En förlorad sommar", written by Tomas Andersson Wij, in a bid to represent Sweden during Eurovision Song Contest. He performed the song on 9 February 2013 during semi-final 2 of the competition, placing seventh and not qualifying further.

He had expanded his theatre career by acting in the play Waiting for Godot at the Royal Dramatic Theatre in Stockholm in 1990, Hamlet at Östgötateatern in 1995, A Chorus Line in 2002 at The Göteborg Opera, Richard III at the National Swedish Touring Theatre in 2006, and conferencier at Colin Nutleys Cabaret at Stockholm City Theatre.

Throughout the years he wrote and performed his own songs and recorded several albums, and in 2001 he won a Grammis award for "Allra störst är kärleken". Wolff took part in the opening ceremony for the Friends Arena in Stockholm, where he performed one of his best known songs, "Pojken på månen".

His final work as an actor was playing Dr. Ruben in 24 episodes of the Sveriges Television's Christmas calendar titled Jakten på tidskristallen, to be shown in December 2017.

== Honours ==
In 2001, Wolff won a Grammis for Min allra största kärlek. In 2011 he was awarded the royal medal Litteris et Artibus for his services as an actor. In June 2013, French president François Hollande made him a Knight of the Legion of Honour for his dedication and work with French music. In addition he was awarded several prizes and stipends, including the 2017 theatre prize of the Swedish Academy.

== Personal life ==
Wolff was openly gay. He had one daughter with Stina Gardell, a Swedish producer and journalist, sister of the Swedish novelist, playwright, screenwriter and comedian Jonas Gardell and the religion scholar Mattias Gardell.

== Death ==
Wolff suffered from pulmonary emphysema since 1988 due to the genetic disease alpha-1 antitrypsin deficiency and died on 17 November 2017, aged 59.

== Filmography ==
- 1980: Sverige åt svenskarna - (uncredited)
- 1988: Livsfarlig film - Sminkör, "kött och ben"
- 1990: Den svarta cirkeln (TV series) - Killander, fotograf
- 1990: Blankt vapen - Eberhardt
- 1990: Honungsvargar
- 1991: Oxen - Johannes
- 1992: House of Angels - Zac
- 1992: Jönssonligan & den svarta diamanten - Romanoff
- 1993: Sista dansen - Vicar
- 1994: Zorn - Isaac Grünewald
- 1994: Lejonkungen (Swedish dub for The Lion King character Scar)
- 1994: Änglagård – andra sommaren - Zac
- 1998: Under the Sun (1998) - Narrator (voice)
- 2000: Vägen till El Dorado (Swedish dub for The Road to El Dorado character Tzekel-Kan)
- 2000: Gossip - Karl-Johan Steen
- 2001: Så vit som en snö - Robert Friedman
- 2001: Lime - Frikk
- 2001: Jolly Roger - Sorte Bill
- 2004: Tre solar - Isak Målare
- 2006: Desmond & träskpatraskfällan - Helmut Sebaot (voice)
- 2007: Elias og kongeskipet - Hoff (Swedish version, voice)
- 2008: Angel - Jess
- 2010: Så olika - Max Scheele
- 2010: Änglagård – tredje gången gillt - Zac
- 2010: Alice i underlandet (Swedish dub for Alice in Wonderland character Absolem)
- 2015: En underbar jävla jul - TV personality
- 2016: Bajsfilmen - Dolores och Gunellens värld - Narrator (voice)
- 2017: Jakten på tidskristallen (TV series) - Dr. Ruben (final appearance)

== Discography ==
- 1991: Recital
- 1995: Pojken på månen
- 1997: Stjärnklara nätter
- 2000: Min allra största kärlek
- 2001: Desemberbarn (with Norwegian Kari Bremnes)
- 2003: Du får mig om jag får dig
- 2004: Chanson suicide
- 2005: Allt du kan önska!
- 2009: Tango
- 2013: Första lågan
