= Strövelstorp =

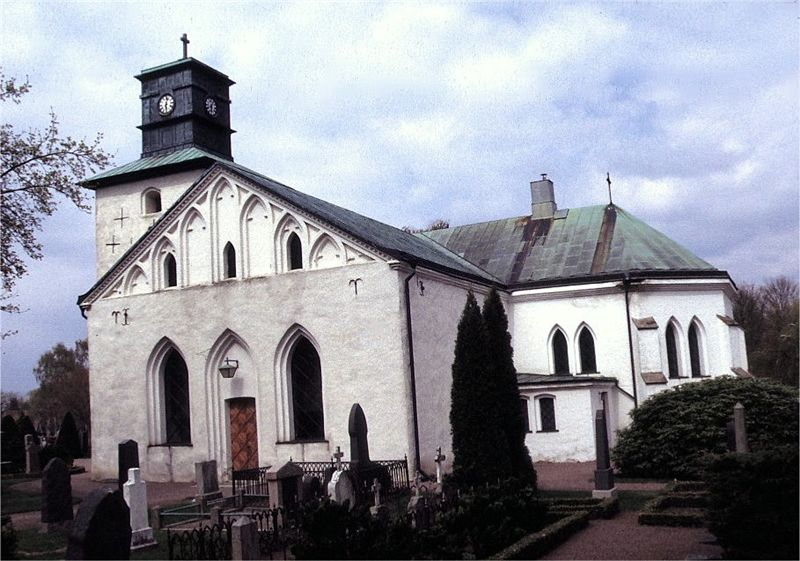
- Strövelstorp Church

- Location within Skåne Location within Sweden
- Coordinates: 56°09′N 12°49′E
- Country: Sweden
- Province: Skåne
- County: Skåne County
- Municipality: Ängelholm Municipality

Area
  - Total: 0.86 km^{2} (0.33 sq mi)

Population (31 December 2010)
  - Total: 1,087
  - Density: 1,270/km^{2} (3,300/sq mi)
- Time zone: UTC+1 (CET)
  - Summer (DST): UTC+2 (CEST)

Strövelstorp is a locality situated in Ängelholm Municipality, Skåne County, Sweden with 1,087 inhabitants in 2010.
