= Hans Bergström =

Swedish-American journalist

Nils Hans Ingemar Bergström (born 13 May 1948) is a Swedish-American journalist and political scientist.

== Biography ==
Bergström was born in Ambjörby, Torsby Municipality, Värmland County, Sweden. His father was a local politician of the Social Democratic Party and editor of the local newspaper Värmlands Folkblad. He studied at Karlstad campus of the University of Gothenburg from 1967 to 1970 and earned a B.A. in political science, economics, cultural geography and statistics. Thereafter he was employed as a secretary at the People's Party's parliament office (during his studies Bergström also served as deputy chairman of the Liberal Youth of Sweden, the youth wing of the People's Party). In 1972 he became a speech writer and assistant to People's Party leader Gunnar Helén. He kept this role until 1980 with future party leaders Per Ahlmark and Ola Ullsten.

From 1980 to 1985, Bergström was executive editor of the newspaper Nerikes Allehanda. In addition to his work at the newspaper, Bergström studied for a doctorate in political science and finished his thesis in 1987. In the same year he became an editorialist for the newspaper Dagens Nyheter, and became its executive editor in 1995. From 2000 to 2001, he studied at Stanford University and at Harvard University, in the United States. During these studies he wrote the study Age in the Press, published by the Joan Shorenstein Center on the Press, Politics and Public Policy in 2001. From 2001 to 2003, Bergström again served as executive editor of Dagens Nyheter. Since 2003 he is an independent columnist for the newspaper.

Bergström currently lives in southern Florida and in Upstate New York in the United States. Bergström has a son from an earlier marriage. He is now married to Barbara. Bergström became a naturalized citizen of the United States in 2007.
