= Rumle Hammerich =

Danish film director, screenwriter and film company director

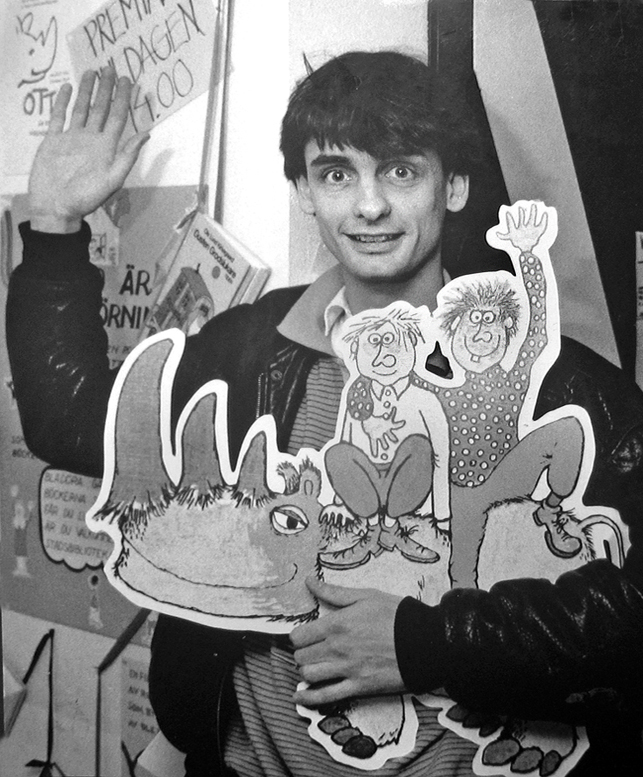
Rumle Hammerich 1988 at the Malmö opening of his first film Otto Is a Rhino.

Jens Peter Hammerich, better known as Rumle Hammerich (born 16 November 1954), is a Danish film director, screenwriter and film company director. He is currently creative director at Nordisk Film.

His filmography consists of both feature films and television films and mini series in Denmark as well as Sweden. His mini series Young Andersen—which describes the formative boarding school years of Hans Christian Andersen— won an Emmy Award for Best international TV Movie/Mini Series in 2005. His crime series The Protectors (Danish: Livvagterne) won the 2009 International Emmy Award for the best television drama series.

== Biography ==
Jens Peter Hammerich was born on 16 November 1954 in Copenhagen to translator Ida Elisabeth Hammerich and Paul Hammerich, journalist, writer and editor in chief at the national Danish newspaper Politiken. From an early age he was called Rumle and when his father in 1959 asked her mother to translate Charles M. Schulz's comic strip Peanuts for Politiken, she gave the perpetually dirty boy Pig-Pen her son's nickname.

He graduated from the National Film School of Denmark in 1979, and had his debut as a feature film director in 1983 with the children film Otto er et næsehorn "Otto Is a Rhino". After working in Sweden in the early 1990s, directing films such as the horror film Svart Lucia and the children film Kan du vissla Johanna?, he was made the director of national Danish television station DR's fiction department in 1994. In 1998 he left DR and the following year he joined Nordisk Film, where he led the subsidiary Nordisk Film Produktion until 2003 when he was made creative director of the company.

== Filmography ==
=== Film ===
Year	Title	Director	Writer
1981	Den Sidste detalje	No	Yes
1981	Cirkus Casablanca	No	Yes
1983	Otto the Rhino	Yes	Yes
1988	Skyggen af Emma	No	Yes
1989	The Dog That Smiled	Yes	No
1992	Svart Lucia	Yes	Yes
2009	Headhunter	Yes	Yes

Producer

- Cliff Forrest (2007) (Documentary)

Executive producer

- Once in a Lifetime (2000)
- Lykkevej (2003)
- En som Hodder (2003)
- Facing the Truth (2002) (Documentary)

Associate producer

- I Am Dina (2002)

Co-producer

- Suxxess (2002)

Creative producer

- Strings (2004)

=== Television ===
Year	Title	Director	Writer	Executive Producer	Notes
1988–90	Dårfinkar & dönickar	Yes	No	No	3 episodes
1993	Satirica	No	Yes	No	
1994	Lærerværelset	Yes	No	No	6 episodes
1995	Mellem venner	No	Idea	No	
1997	Taxa	Yes	No	Yes	2 episodes
2000	Rejseholdet	No	Yes	No	
2000	Herr von Hancken	Yes	No	No	mini series
2005	Young Andersen	Yes	Yes	No	mini series
2018	The Bridge	Yes	No	No	Series 4

Executive producer

- Leif Panduro (1998)
- Rundt om Panduro (1998)
- Beck (1 episode, 2002)
- Forsvar (2003)

TV movies

Year	Title	Director	Writer
1987	Quark and the Vikings	No	Story
1991	Fasadklättraren	Yes	Yes
1994	Kan du vissla Johanna?	Yes	No
