= Van Veeteren =

Fictional character created by Håkan Nesser

- First appearance: The Mind's Eye
- Last appearance: The G File
- Created by: Håkan Nesser
- Portrayed by: Sven Wollter

In-universe information
- Gender: Male
- Title: Detective Chief Inspector
- Occupation: Police detective (retired), antique bookshop owner

Van Veeteren is a fictional retired Detective Chief Inspector and the main character in a series of eleven novels by Håkan Nesser, of which nine have been filmed. In the films, Van Veeteren is portrayed by Sven Wollter.

== Setting ==
The novels take place in a fictional town called Maardam, situated somewhere in a European country resembling the Netherlands, Sweden, Germany and Poland. Maardam has around 300 000 inhabitants (according to the first novel, The Mind's Eye).

== Character profile ==
The main character, Van Veeteren, is in his sixties. In the first five novels he is still a Detective Chief Inspector; in the last five novels he is retired, but sometimes he leaves his antiquarian book store to help out with investigations. In his youth, he was a student at the university of Maardam. Van Veeteren is a bit grumpy and cynical, enjoys dark beer and chess. He has two children, Erich (black sheep of the family with criminal history) and Jess (who moved to France, got married and has two children). Van Veeteren is divorced, but meets a new woman, Ulrike Fremdli, during the series. Van Veeteren is very intuitive when it comes to reading people. He has only one unsolved case in his résumé, The Case G.

== Books ==
- Det grovmaskiga nätet ("The Mind's Eye") - 1993
- Borkmanns punkt ("Borkmann's Point") - 1994
- Återkomsten ("The Return") - 1995
- Kvinna med födelsemärke ("Woman with Birthmark") - 1996
- Kommissarien och tystnaden ("The Inspector and Silence") - 1997
- Münsters Fall ("Münster's Case"/"The Unlucky Lottery") - 1998
- Carambole ("Hour of the Wolf") - 1999
- Ewa Morenos fall ("The Weeping Girl") - 2000
- Svalan, katten, rosen, döden ("The Strangler's Honeymoon") - 2001
- Fallet G ("The G File") - 2003

== Films ==
Veteran Swedish actor Sven Wollter played Van Veeteren in a series of television mini-series and direct-to-video films.

- Det grovmaskiga nätet (2000, 2 episodes)
- Återkomsten (2001, 3 episodes)
- Kvinna med födelsemärke (2001, 3 episodes)
- Münsters fall (2005)
- Carambole (2005)
- Borkmanns punkt (2005)
- Moreno & tystnaden (2006)
- Svalan, katten, rosen, döden (2006)
- Fallet G (2006)
