= Wede (surname) =

Surname

Wede is a surname. Notable people with the surname include:

- Lisa Wede (born 1951), Swedish journalist
- Anton Wede (born 1990), Swedish footballer
- Calle Wede (born 1990), Swedish footballer
