= S/Y Joy =

- Swedish theatrical poster
- Directed by: Göran du Rées
- Written by: Inger Alfvén (novel); Inger Alfvén (screenplay); Göran du Rées (writer)
- Produced by: Anders Birkeland; Börje Hansson
- Starring: See below
- Cinematography: Henrik Paersch
- Edited by: Carina Hellberg; Thomas Holéwa
- Music by: Göran Lagerberg
- Release date: 21 August 1989
- Running time: 93 minutes
- Country: Sweden
- Language: Swedish

S/Y Joy (Swedish: S/Y Glädjen) is a 1989 Swedish drama film directed by Göran du Rées, made after the book by Inger Alfvén.

== Plot ==
A young couple, devastated over the loss of their child in an accident, take a vacation aboard a yacht, but the wife quickly becomes obsessed with uncovering a similar tragedy that occurred on an earlier voyage.

== Cast ==
- Lena Olin as Annika Larsson
- Stellan Skarsgård as Klas Larsson
- Viveka Seldahl as Maja-Lena Skoog
- Hans Mosesson as Herbert Skoog

== Soundtrack ==
- Style - "Dover-Calais" (Written by Tommy Ekman & Christer Sandelin)

== Awards ==
At the 25th Guldbagge Awards, Viveka Seldahl won the award for Best Actress.
