= Hemsöborna (TV series) =

1966 Swedish television serial

- Genre: drama
- Based on: The People of Hemsö by August Strindberg
- Screenplay by: Herbert Grevenius
- Directed by: Bengt Lagerkvist
- Starring: Sif Ruud; Allan Edwall; Sven Wollter
- Composer: Bo Nilsson
- Country of origin: Sweden
- Original language: Swedish
- No. of episodes: 7 (1966), 3 (1971)

Production
- Producer: Leif Ringman
- Cinematography: Bertil Wiktorsson
- Editor: Lennart Arvidsson
- Running time: 210 minutes (1966); 180 minutes (1971)

Original release
- Network: Sveriges Television
- Release: 19 February – 2 April 1966

Hemsöborna is a 1966 Swedish drama television series directed by Bengt Lagerkvist, starring Sif Ruud, Allan Edwall and Sven Wollter. It follows the social dynamics when a widow hires a man to run her farm on an island in the Stockholm Archipelago. It is based on the 1887 novel The People of Hemsö by August Strindberg. Produced by Sveriges Television (SVT), it was the most expensive Swedish television production of all time when it was made.

SVT first broadcast Hemsöborna in 7 episodes of 30 minutes each from 19 February to 2 April 1966. A version edited into two episodes was broadcast in 1967 and a version with 3 60-minute episodes was broadcast multiple times from 1971 to 1999. The series was released on DVD in 2004.

The series was a great success both with critics and viewers, with viewership in the millions. It was a major breakthrough for Wollter. Lagerkvist went on to direct other high-profile television adaptations of Swedish literary classics, notably Strindberg's The Red Room in 1970, where he reunited with Hemsöborna's screenwriter Herbert Grevenius and cinematographer Bertil Wiktorsson.

== Cast ==
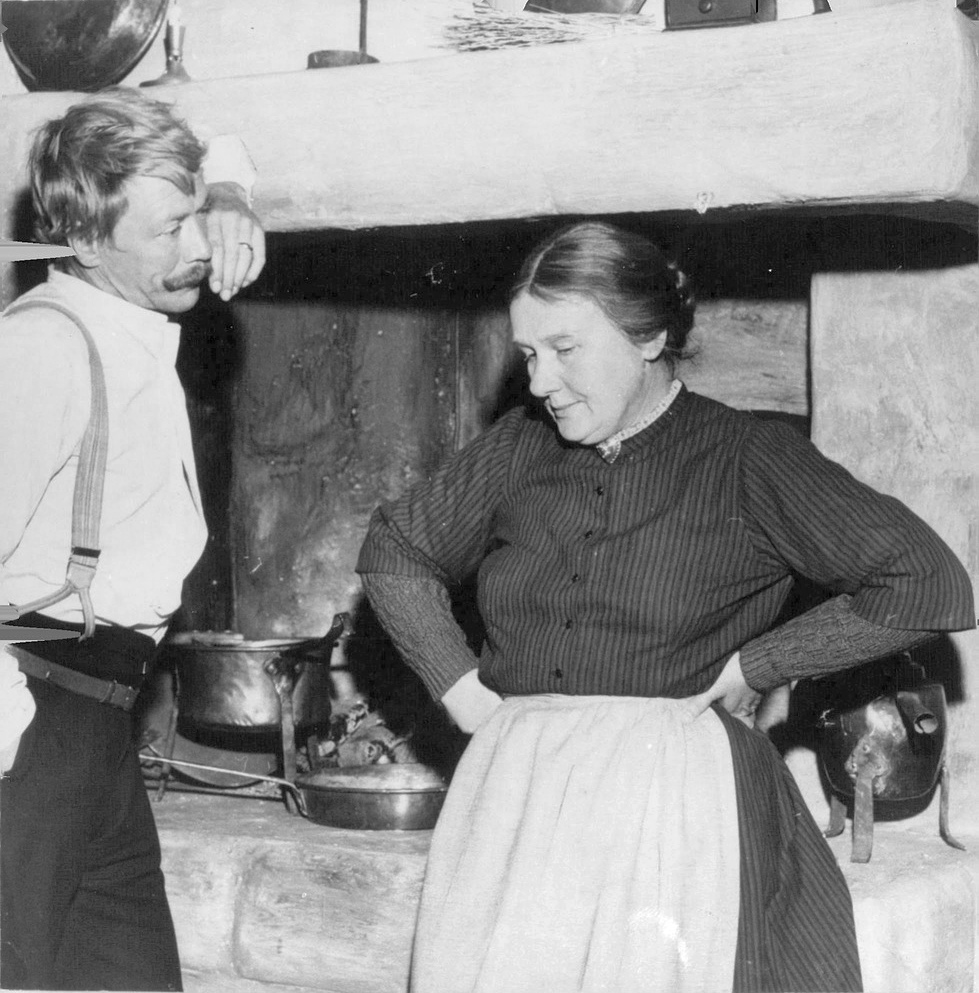
Allan Edwall and Sif Ruud on a press photo

- Sif Ruud as madam Flod
- Allan Edwall as Carlsson
- Sven Wollter as Gusten
- Hilding Gavle as Rundqvist
- Håkan Serner as Norman
- Julia Cæsar as the priest's maid
- Edvin Adolphson as Erik Nordström, the priest
- Ulf Palme as narrator

== See also ==
- The People of Hemsö (1944 film)
- The People of Hemsö (1955 film)
