= Sista leken =

1984 film

- Directed by: Jon Lindström
- Written by: Walentin Chorell
- Produced by: Bert Sundberg
- Starring: Sven Wollter
- Cinematography: Peter Mokrosinski
- Release dates: 16 March 1984 (Sweden); 24 August 1984 (Finland)
- Running time: 97 minutes
- Countries: Sweden; Finland
- Language: Swedish

Sista leken (Finnish: Viimeinen kesä) is a 1984 Finnish-Swedish drama film directed by Jon Lindström. Sven Wollter won the award for Best Actor at the 20th Guldbagge Awards.

== Cast ==
- Sven Wollter as Viktor
- Karolina Korpioja as Agneta
- Aino Seppo as Agneta's Mother
- Soli Labbart as Agneta's Grandma
- Tomas Laustiola as Agneta's Father
- Bibi Andersson as Viktor's Wife
- Jacob Hirdwall as Viktor's son
- Ulf Törnroth as Farmer
- Toni Regner as Farmer's wife
- Kalevi Kahra as Ferry man

== Production ==
Director Jon Lindström revealed that Karolina Korpioja wasn't his first choice for Agneta's role. "Instead of her, I'd chosen my own daughter (Yaba Holst), but the producer wouldn't let me. I was too close to her. But I really like to think of an actor when I'm writing. It's very stimulating," he said.
