= Skoindustrimuseet i Kumla =

Museum in Kumla, Sweden

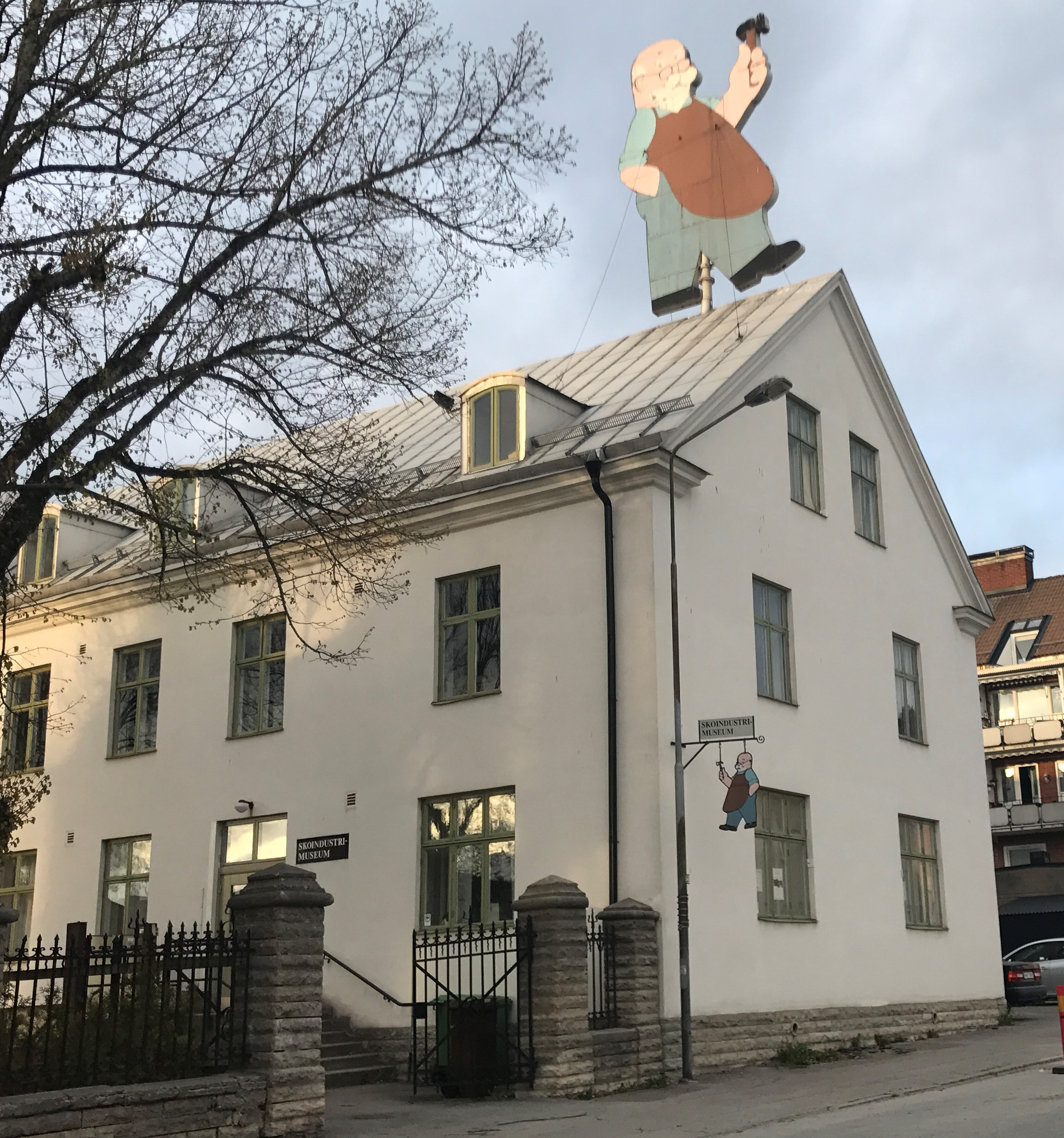
- Established: 1986
- Location: Sveavägen 19, Kumla, Sweden
- Coordinates: 59.126111°N 15.147222°E
- Type: Calceology
- Director: Lilian Edström
- Website: www.skoindustrimuseet.se

Skoindustrimuseet i Kumla, the Shoe Industry Museum in Kumla, Sweden is a museum memorialising the surrounding region’s history of shoe manufacturing. The museum houses exhibitions of the development of Sweden’s shoe industry and the country’s shoe fashion between 1890 and 1980. Its collections include several hundred shoes, tools and equipment for shoemaking. In addition, the museum has an active shoemaking establishment, and shoes produced on the premises are available for sale.

According to the museum, Kumla Municipality has had some 130 shoe manufacturers over the years. In the 1930s, half of the Sweden’s shoe manufacturers were located in Örebro County. The local industry suffered when shoe imports were deregulated in the 1950s, and by the 1970s only a few producers remained in the country. To keep alive the memory of this once important industry, a local trust set up the museum in the mid-1980s.
