= Karl Seldahl =

Swedish film director

- Born: Karl Joni Wollter; 12 June 1975 (age 50); Gothenburg, Sweden
- Occupation: Actor
- Years active: 1987–present
- Parent(s): Sven Wollter; Viveka Seldahl
- Relatives: Stina Wollter (half sister); Karl-Anders Wollter (uncle)

Karl Joni Seldahl (born Wollter 12 June 1975) is a Swedish film and theatre director and former child actor.

He was born in Gothenburg and is the son of Sven Wollter and Viveka Seldahl. He studied at Dramatiska Institutet.
