= Kumla =

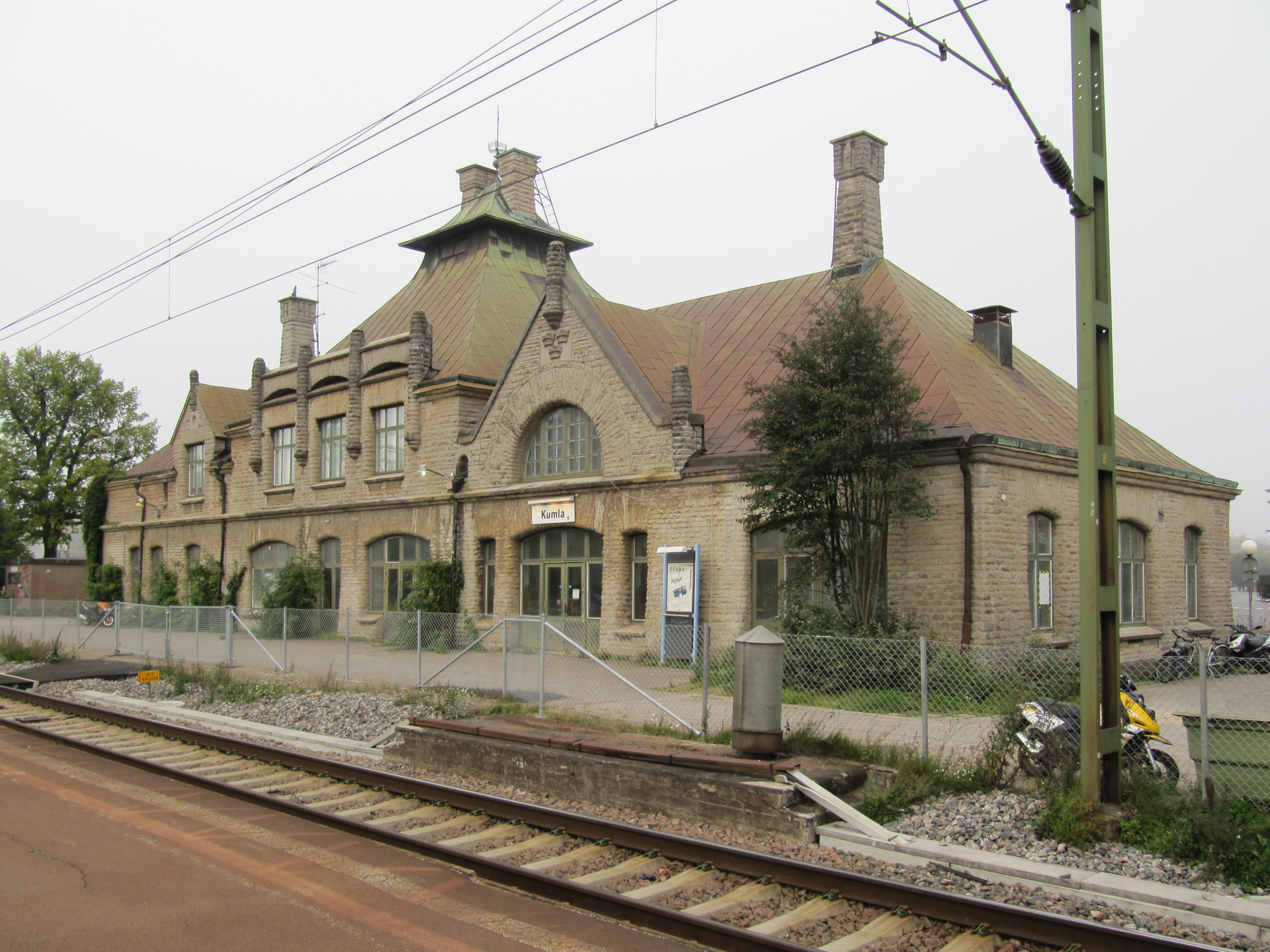
- Kumla Train Station

- Location within Örebro Location within Sweden
- Coordinates: 59°07′N 15°08′E
- Country: Sweden
- Province: Närke
- County: Örebro County
- Municipality: Kumla Municipality

Area
  - Total: 7.79 km^{2} (3.01 sq mi)

Population (31 December 2018)
  - Total: 21,640
  - Density: 1,806/km^{2} (4,680/sq mi)
- Time zone: UTC+1 (CET)
  - Summer (DST): UTC+2 (CEST)

Kumla is a locality and the seat of Kumla Municipality, Örebro County, Sweden with a population of 21,640 as of 2018.

== Geography ==
Kumla is situated roughly 15 kilometres south of neighbouring city Örebro, and is connected to its much larger neighbour with train and bus commuting. Kumla is unusual in terms of municipality seats in Svealand in that there is no connection to any kind of waterway in the centre of the town. However, three of the four biggest lakes in the country are within an hour's drive from the town. It is also an unusually flat town, since it is situated in the middle of the so-called Närke Plain. There is also a very agrarian landscape surrounding Kumla.

== Transport ==
Kumla is linked with several roads, including the highway E20 that is passing just west of the locality. The E20 is the fastest route to both Gothenburg and Stockholm, which Kumla is situated relatively close to the middle between the two largest Swedish cities. E20 passes Örebro as well, but there are several routes which go to the larger neighbour city from Kumla. The roads 51 (from Norrköping) and 52 (from Nyköping) also pass through Kumla.

Kumla also has a train station on the Stockholm-Gothenburg route driven by SJ.

== History ==
Kumla was known as a shoe manufacturing town since the first half of the 19th century. This history is memorialized in Kumla's Shoe Industry Museum, with a small-scale production of shoes.

Kumla got the title of a city in 1942, but is since 1971 the seat of the larger Kumla Municipality.

== Today ==
Today the industry is dominated by the manufacturing of jam at Bob Industries and communication systems at an Ericsson industry.

The name Kumla is renowned for its prison ("the Kumla Institution", or Kumlaanstalten, commonly known as 'The Bunker'), which is the largest prison in the country. Opened in 1965, it can currently allow 333 male inmates, with a similarly large staff, and is designated for "difficult" inmates and for those at the start of a life-term sentence. It is one of three Swedish prisons housing the most notorious and dangerous inmates.

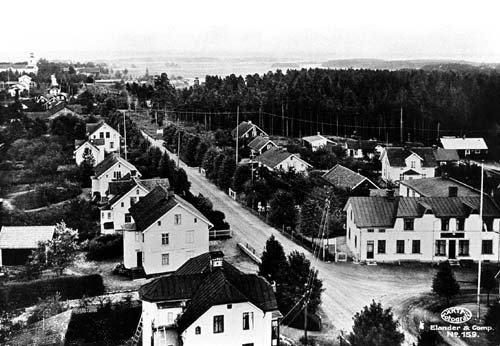
In 1920, Kumla was still a small town

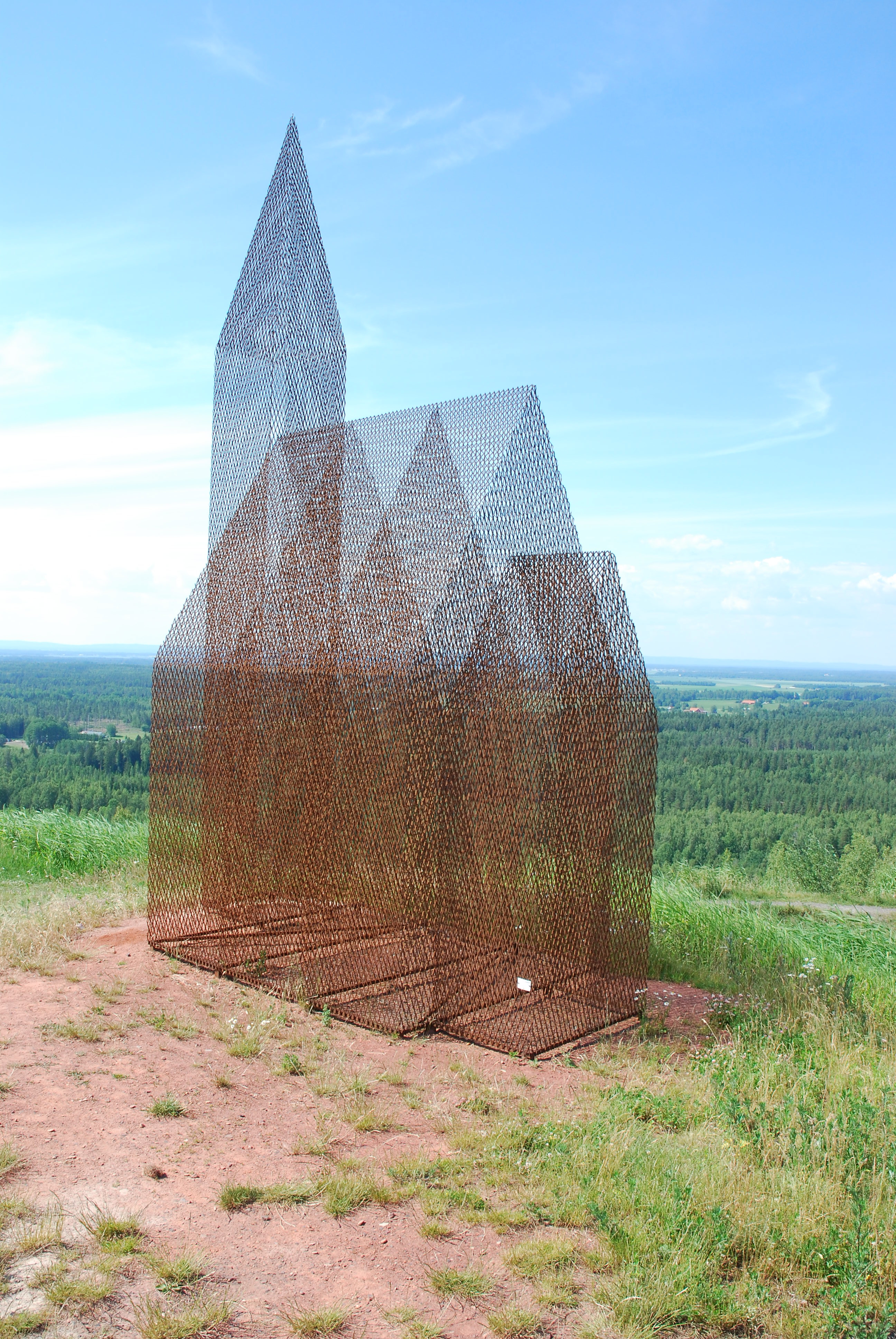
"Absit Omen" artwork by Swedish artist Kent Karlsson placed on the permanent exhibition "Konst på hög" in Kumla

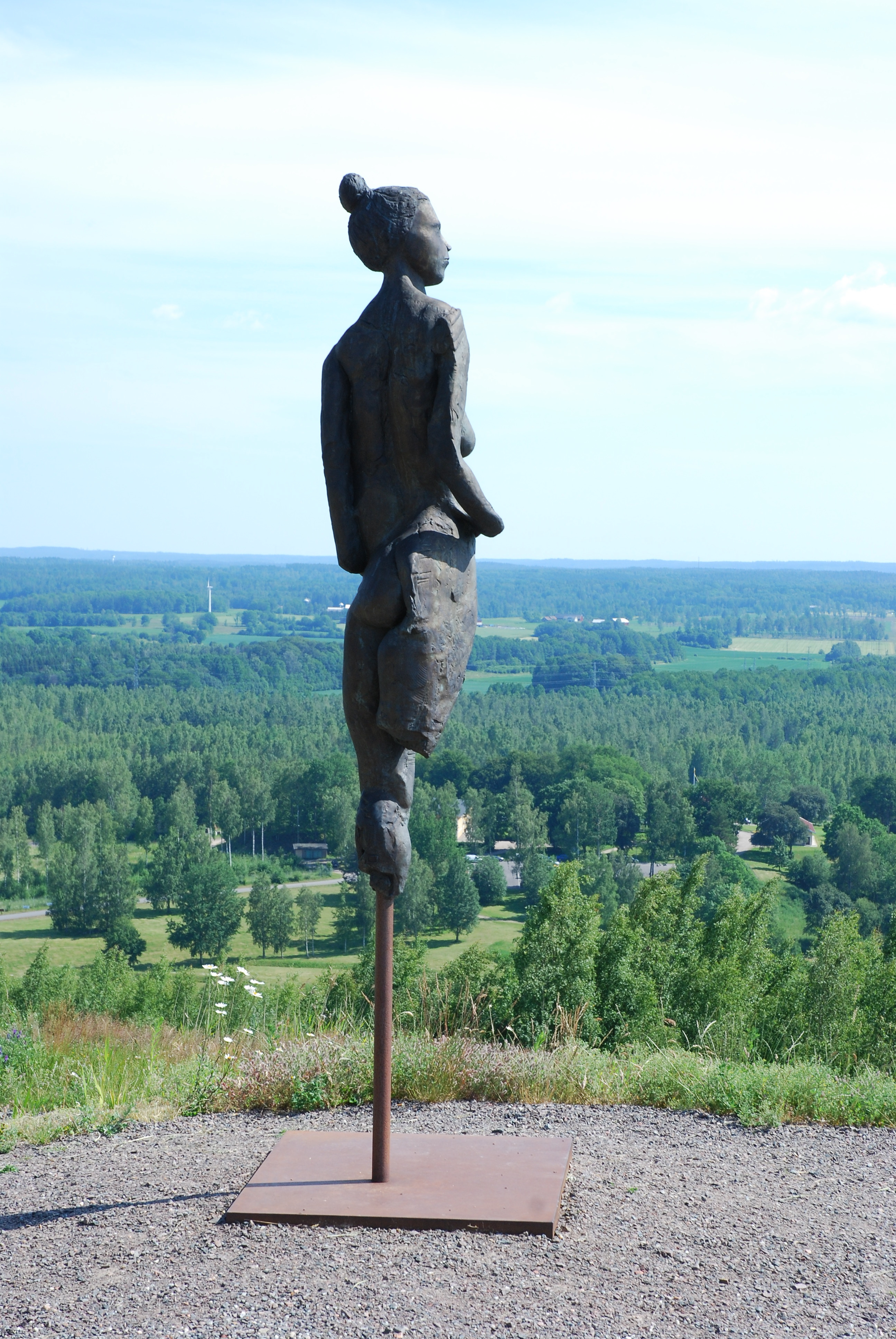
"Karyatid" by Richard Brixel, at the same exhibition

== Notable people ==
- Hampus Ericsson (2003–), racing driver
- Marcus Ericsson (1990–), racing driver, 2022 Indy 500 winner
- Pierre Bengtsson (1988–), association football player
- Fredrik Ekblom (1970–), racing driver
- Håkan Nesser (1950–), author
- Peter Stormare (1953–), actor, born in Kumla but grew up in Arbrå
