= Stellan Skarsgård =

Swedish actor (born 1951)

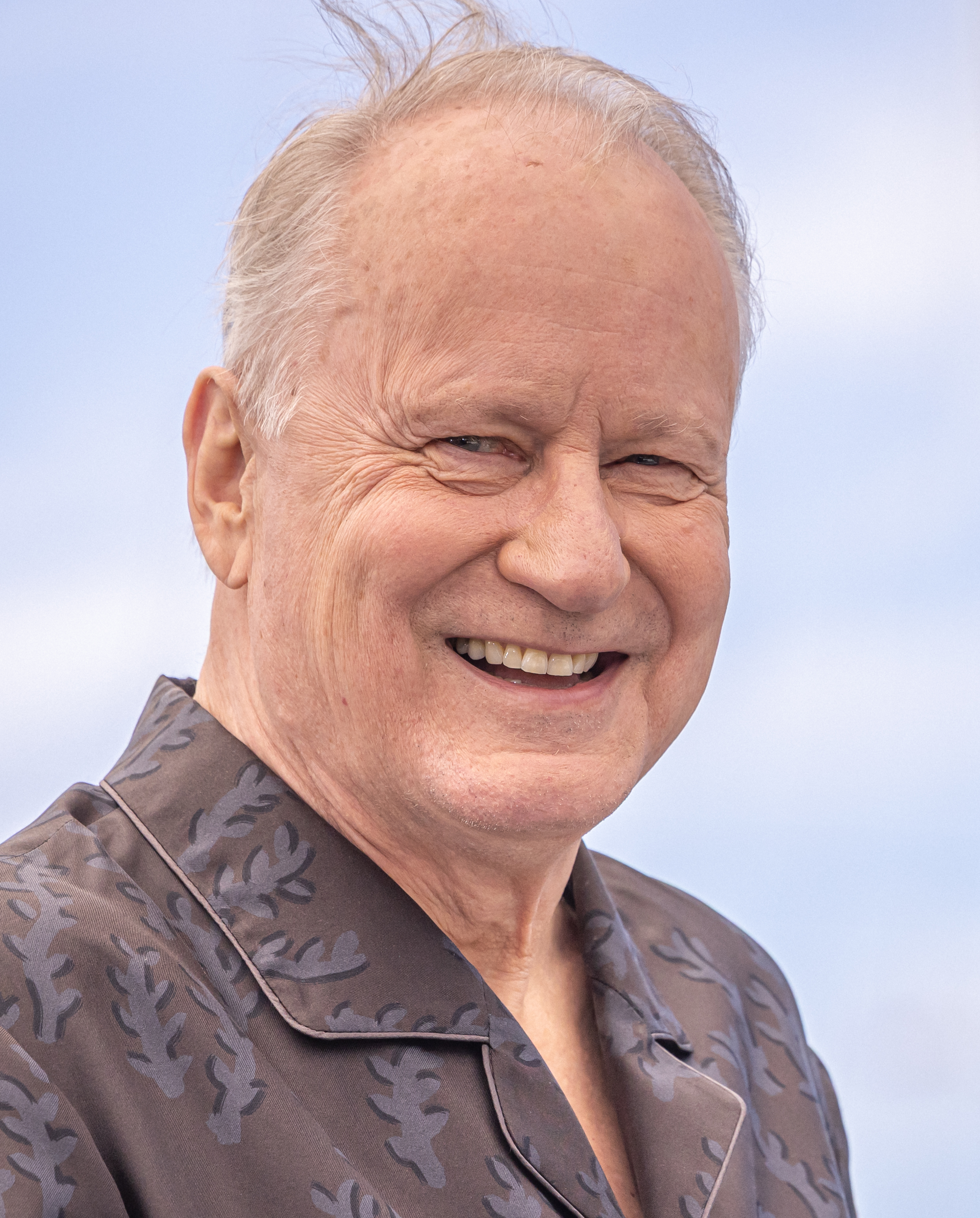
- Skarsgård at the 2025 Cannes Film Festival
- Born: Stellan John Skarsgård; 13 June 1951 (age 75); Gothenburg, Sweden
- Occupation: Actor
- Years active: 1968–present
- Spouses: My Skarsgård (m. 1975; div. 2007); Megan Everett (m. 2009)
- Children: 8, including Alexander, Gustaf, Bill, Valter, and Kolbjörn

Stellan John Skarsgård (/ˈstɛlən ˈskɑːrsɡɔːrd/ STEL-un SKARS-gord, Swedish: [ˈstɛ̂lːan ˈskɑ̌ːʂɡoːɖ]; born 13 June 1951) is a Swedish actor. His accolades include two Golden Globe Awards and a nomination for an Academy Award. He is known for his collaborations with director Lars von Trier, appearing in Breaking the Waves (1996), Dancer in the Dark (2000), and Melancholia (2011). His early Hollywood films include The Hunt for Red October (1990) and Good Will Hunting (1997).

Skarsgård has appeared in several film franchises, including Pirates of the Caribbean, the Marvel Cinematic Universe, and Dune. His other notable films include the musical Mamma Mia! (2008), the thriller The Girl with the Dragon Tattoo (2011), and Sentimental Value (2025), for which he earned a Golden Globe Award and an Academy Award nomination for Best Supporting Actor.

On television, he portrayed Boris Shcherbina in the HBO miniseries Chernobyl (2019), for which he won a Golden Globe Award and received a Primetime Emmy Award nomination. He also portrayed Luthen Rael in the Star Wars political spy thriller series Andor (2022–2025), for which he received critical acclaim.

== Early life and education ==
Stellan John Skarsgård was born on 13 June 1951 in Gothenburg, Sweden, the son of Gudrun (née Larsson; born 1930) and Jan Skarsgård (1920–1998). He moved often in his childhood and lived, amongst other places, in Helsingborg, Totebo, Kalmar, Marielund, and Uppsala.

== Acting career ==
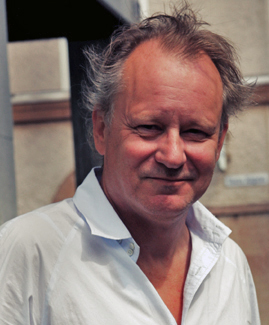
Skarsgård in 2009

Skarsgård started his acting career early; and, by the age of 21, his experience in film, TV and stage was considerable. Most of his early roles were in Swedish television (such as Bombi Bitt) and films. Of Skarsgård's work in Swedish film, he is known for Good Evening, Mr. Wallenberg, where he portrays Swedish diplomat Raoul Wallenberg, who worked to save Holocaust victims.

Skarsgård is particularly associated with director Lars von Trier and has appeared in six of the Danish auteur's features: The Kingdom, Breaking the Waves, Dancer in the Dark, Dogville, Melancholia, and Nymphomaniac. His most personal working relationship, however, is with Norwegian director Hans Petter Moland, who has directed the actor in Zero Kelvin, Aberdeen, In Order of Disappearance, and A Somewhat Gentle Man. Skarsgård considers Moland a close friend and, in 2009, he said of their relationship: "We're like an old married couple and I get separation anxiety." Another Scandinavian work that he is known for is the 1997 Norwegian film Insomnia, in which he plays the guilt-ridden policeman Jonas Engström.

Skarsgård's first American film was the 1985 film Noon Wine, directed by Michael Fields, in which Skarsgård played a mentally disturbed immigrant farmhand being chased by a bounty hunter. He acted opposite Fred Ward, who portrayed the farmer. In 1990, he starred in another American film, The Hunt for Red October, playing the character of Captain Tupolev, a Soviet submarine commander.

Primarily a character actor, he played one of Demi Moore's two love interests in Passion of Mind (2000), directed by Alain Berliner. Skarsgård appeared as a guest star on Entourage as Verner Vollstedt, the German director of the fictional film Smokejumpers, who is hostile to the main character Vincent Chase. Skarsgård appeared as Bootstrap Bill Turner in both Pirates of the Caribbean: Dead Man's Chest and Pirates of the Caribbean: At World's End. In 2008, he starred as Bill Anderson in Universal Pictures' Mamma Mia! and reprised the role 10 years later in its sequel Mamma Mia! Here We Go Again.

Skarsgård played Dr. Erik Selvig in the 2011 film Thor, and later reprised the role in Thor: The Dark World (2013) and Thor: Love and Thunder (2022), as well as The Avengers (2012) and Avengers: Age of Ultron (2015). Skarsgård reteamed with Thor director Kenneth Branagh for the 2015 live-action adaptation of Disney's Cinderella, in which he played The Grand Duke. In 2021, he played Vladimir Harkonnen in Denis Villeneuve's Dune (2021), and reprised the role in Dune: Part Two (2024). Skarsgård also co-starred alongside his son Gustaf Skarsgård in the Swedish psychological thriller What Remains (2022).

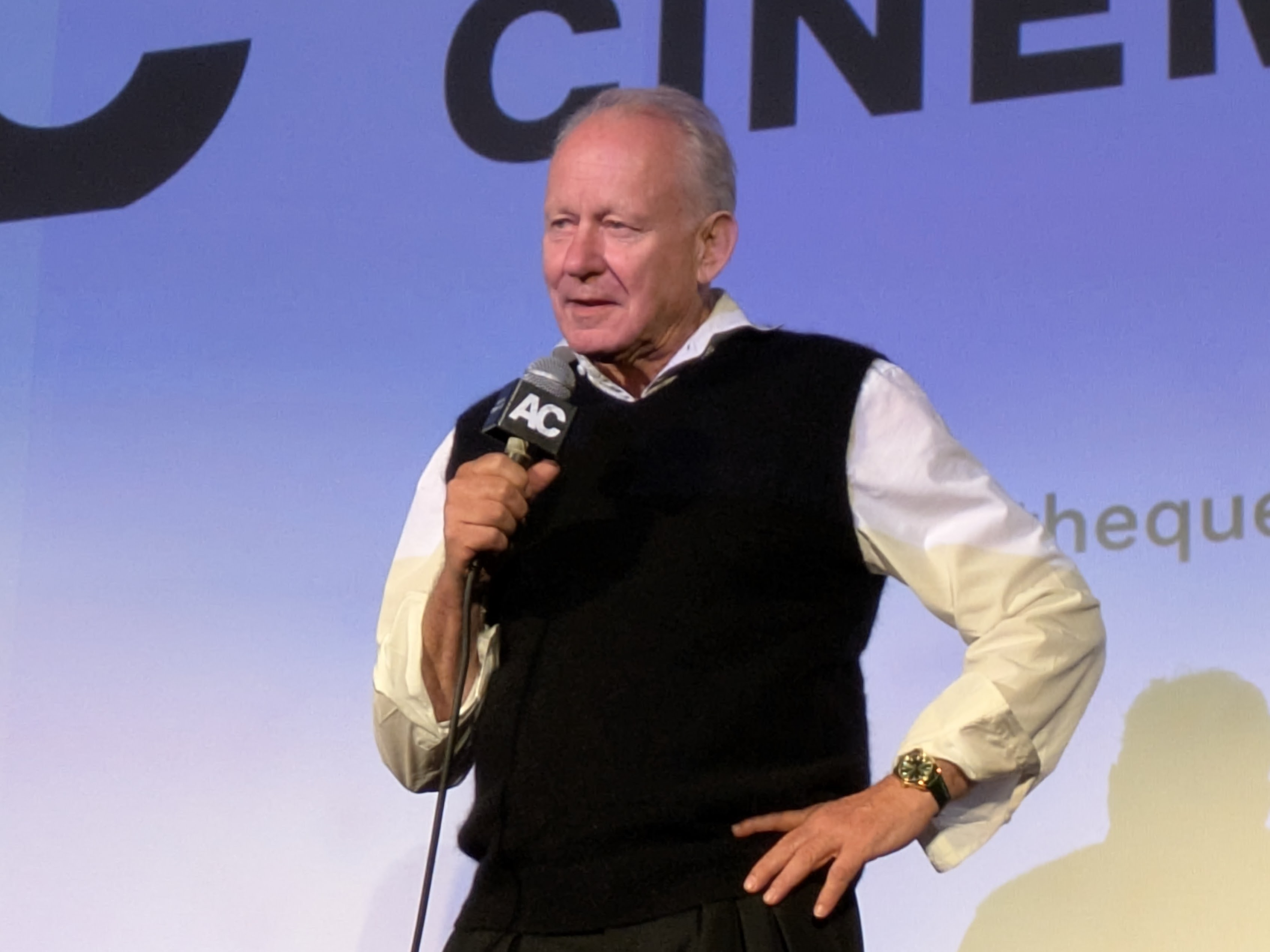
Skarsgård speaks in Los Angeles in Feb. 2026

From 2022 to 2025, Skarsgård played Rebel spymaster Luthen Rael in the Star Wars series Andor, for which he received critical acclaim. Skarsgård appeared in the 2025 Joachim Trier film Sentimental Value, for which he received the Golden Globe Award for Best Supporting Actor and an Academy Award for Best Supporting Actor nomination.

Skarsgård has appeared in music videos alongside fellow Swedes. He was in Eva Dahlgren's "Vem tänder stjärnorna" (Who Lights the Stars) in 1991 and Lykke Li's 2011 music video, "Sadness Is a Blessing".

== Personal life ==
In April 1975, Skarsgård married a Swedish doctor, My. Before divorcing My in 2007, they had six children together including Alexander, Gustaf, Bill, and Valter. In January 2009, Skarsgård married American screenwriter, producer and children's book author Megan Everett (born 1976). They have two sons together, one of whom is Kolbjörn. Six of his eight children are active actors in film and television. In 2016, Skarsgård said that he had a vasectomy because he felt that eight children was enough.

In an interview with Vulture in October 2025, Skarsgård revealed that he suffered a stroke in 2022, which affected his memory and language and led him to wear an earpiece with an assistant feeding him his lines during the filming of Dune: Part Two (2024) and Andor season 2 (2025). Skarsgård later added: "it was like balancing on a knife edge because I had to have a new way of working with prompters and stuff… I’m still working on it. But I’m glad that the core of the acting, the important thing, the essence of it, obviously survived."

=== Religious beliefs ===
Skarsgård was brought up by humanist, atheist parents, and had an atheist grandfather and a deeply religious grandmother. According to Skarsgård, this never led to any problems because of the family's mutual respect for each other's opinions. After the September 11 attacks, Skarsgård set out to read the Bible and the Quran, both of which he condemns as violent. Skarsgård is also a critic of religious independent schools in the Swedish educational system. He has said he considers the question of God's existence to be "absurd and completely uninteresting" since if a benevolent God were to exist he would judge only a person's deeds and not care for worship, but if God were actually so vain as to constantly demand worship, then he would not be worthy of it.

In 2009, Skarsgård, along with other non-religious artists, authors, and entrepreneurs including Christer Sturmark, Björn Ulvaeus, and Christer Fuglesang, wrote an article in Dagens Nyheter in support of secularity. The group also criticised the UN for its stance on blasphemy laws.

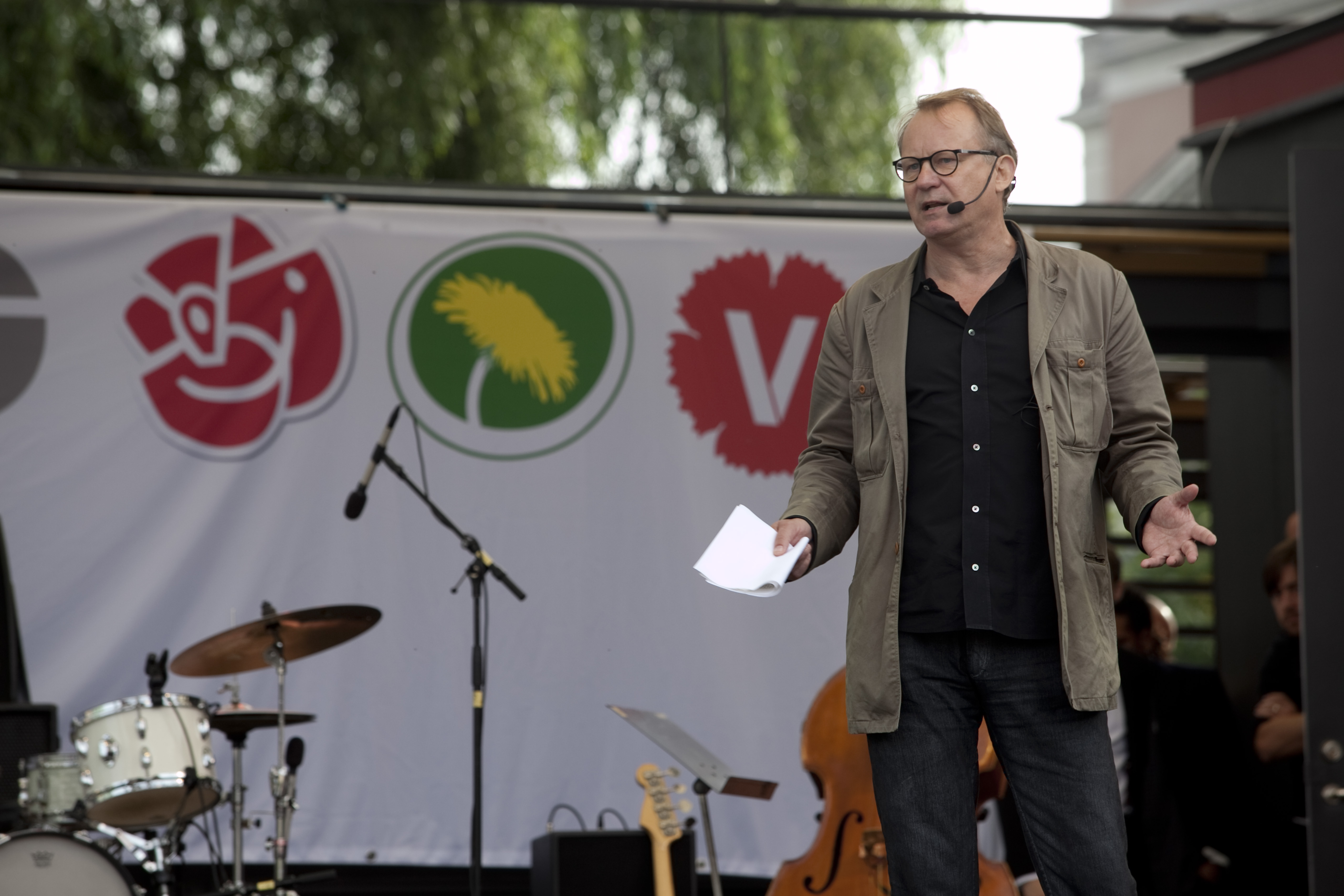
Skarsgård speaking at a Red-Green rally in Sweden, 2010

=== Political views ===
Skarsgård has voiced support for Swedish tax policies, and for a high income tax rate for high earners. He supported the Red-Greens in the 2010 general election. He is avowedly anti-nationalist.

Skarsgård is a supporter of Palestine, protesting the Israeli invasion of the Gaza Strip and auctioning off a signed Mamma Mia! record for a fundraiser for humanitarian aid.

== Filmography ==
=== Film ===
Year	Title	Role	Notes
1972	Strandhugg i somras	Erik	
1972	Firmafesten	Peter	
1973	Åttonde budet		Short
1973	Fem døgn i August	Christer	
1973	Bröllopet	Roffe Eriksson	
1973	Anita: Swedish Nymphet	Erik	
1974	Swedish Sex Games		Aka The Intruders and Let Us Play Sex
1977	Taboo	Jan-Erik	
1977	Hemåt i natten	Kurt Sjöberg	
1981	Kyssen		Short
1982	The Simple-Minded Murderer	Sven	
1983	P & B	Karl-Johan 'Charlie' Pettersson	
1984	Åke och hans värld	Ebenholtz	
1985	False as Water	Stig	
1985	Noon Wine	Olaf Helton	
1985	Peter-No-Tail in Americat	Pelle Swanson (voice)	
1986	Ormens väg på hälleberget	Karl Orsa Markström	
1987	Jim & Piraterna Blom	Gustav, Jim's Father	Also writer
1987	Hip hip hurra!	Peder Severin Krøyer	
1988	The Unbearable Lightness of Being	The Engineer	
1988	Vargens tid	Peder Ulfstand	
1988	Friends	Matt	
1988	The Perfect Murder	Axel Svensson	
1989	S/Y Glädjen	Klas Larsson	
1989	Täcknamn Coq Rouge	Carl Hamilton	
1989	Kvinnorna på taket	Willy	
1990	The Hunt for Red October	Captain 2nd rank Viktor Tupolev	
1990	Good Evening, Mr. Wallenberg	Raoul Wallenberg	
1991	The Ox	Helge Roos	
1992	The Democratic Terrorist	Carl Hamilton	
1992	Wind	Joe Heiser	
1993	The Slingshot	Fritiof Schütt	
1993	Sista dansen	Host in Norrköping	
1995	Jönssonligans största kupp	Herman Melvin	
1995	Zero Kelvin	Randbæk	
1995	The Dogs of Riga	Magnus Björk	
1996	Harry och Sonja	Harry Olsson	
1996	Breaking the Waves	Jan Nyman	
1997	Insomnia	Jonas Engström	
1997	My Son the Fanatic	Schitz	
1997	Good Will Hunting	Prof. Gerald Lambeau	
1997	Amistad	Tappan	
1998	Glasblåsarns barn	Albert	
1998	Savior	Peter Dominic	
1998	Ronin	Gregor	
1999	Deep Blue Sea	Jim Whitlock	
2000	Harlan County War	Warren Jakopovich	
2000	Passion of Mind	William Granther	
2000	Signs and Wonders	Alec	
2000	Timecode	Alex Green	
2000	Dancer in the Dark	Doctor	
2000	Aberdeen	Tomas	Also associate producer
2001	Kiss Kiss (Bang Bang)	Felix	
2001	The Hire	Harvey Jacobs	Short film: "Powder Keg"
2001	Taking Sides	Dr. Wilhelm Furtwängler	
2001	The Glass House	Terrence 'Terry' Glass	
2002	No Good Deed	Tyrone	
2002	City of Ghosts	Joseph Kaspar	
2003	To Kill a Child	Narrator	Short
2003	Dogville	Chuck	
2004	Eiffeltornet	Jakob	Short
2004	King Arthur	Cerdic	
2004	Exorcist: The Beginning	Father Lankester Merrin	
2005	Dominion: Prequel to the Exorcist	Father Lankester Merrin	
2005	Torte Bluma	Stangl	Short
2005	Beowulf & Grendel	Hrothgar	
2005	Guilty Hearts	Stangl	Segment: "Torte Bluma"
2006	Kill Your Darlings	Erik's Father	
2006	Goya's Ghosts	Francisco Goya	
2006	Pirates of the Caribbean: Dead Man's Chest	Bootstrap Bill Turner	
2007	Pirates of the Caribbean: At World's End	Bootstrap Bill Turner	
2007	The Killing Gene	Eddie Argo	
2007	Arn – The Knight Templar	Birger Brosa	
2008	Arn – The Kingdom at Road's End	Birger Brosa	
2008	Mamma Mia!	Bill Anderson	
2008	God on Trial	Baumgarten	
2009	Angels & Demons	Commander Maximilian Richter	
2009	Boogie Woogie	Bob Maccelstone	
2009	Metropia	Ralph Parker	Voice
2010	A Somewhat Gentle Man	Ulrik	
2010	Frankie and Alice	Dr. Oz	
2010	Moomins and the Comet Chase	Moominpapa / Hemulens	Voices
2010	Submission	Narrator	English version; documentary
2010	As If I Am Not There	Doctor	
2010	King of Devil's Island	Bestyreren	Also executive producer
2011	Melancholia	Jack	
2011	The Girl with the Dragon Tattoo	Martin Vanger	
2011	Thor	Erik Selvig	
2012	The Avengers	Erik Selvig	
2013	Thor: The Dark World	Erik Selvig	
2013	Romeo and Juliet	Prince of Verona	
2013	The Railway Man	Finlay	
2013	Nymphomaniac	Seligman	
2013	The Physician	Barber	
2014	In Order of Disappearance	Nils	Also executive producer
2014	Hector and the Search for Happiness	Edward	
2015	Cinderella	The Grand Duke	
2015	Avengers: Age of Ultron	Erik Selvig	
2016	Our Kind of Traitor	Dima	
2017	Return to Montauk	Max Frisch	
2017	Borg McEnroe	Lennart Bergelin	
2017	Moomins and the Winter Wonderland	Moominpappa	English dub
2017	Gordon & Paddy	Gordon	Voice
2018	The Man Who Killed Don Quixote	The Boss	
2018	Mamma Mia! Here We Go Again	Bill Anderson / Kurt Anderson	
2019	Out Stealing Horses	Trond	
2019	The Painted Bird	Hans	
2019	I'll Find You	Benno Moser	
2019	Hope	Tomas	
2021	Apstjärnan	Tord	
2021	Dune	Baron Vladimir Harkonnen	
2022	Thor: Love and Thunder	Erik Selvig	Cameo
2022	What Remains	Soren Rank	
2024	Dune: Part Two	Baron Vladimir Harkonnen	
2025	Sentimental Value	Gustav Borg	Also executive producer

=== Television ===
Year	Title	Role	Notes
1968	Bombi Bitt och jag	Bombi Bitt	5 episodes
1972	Magnetisören	Soldier	Television film
1981	Skärp dig, älskling	Georg	Episode: "Tack för igår"
1981	Babels hus	Dr. Mattsson	Episode: "Del 4"
1981	Olsson per sekund eller Det finns ingen anledning till oro	The tardy one	Television film
1983	Farmor och vår herre	Nathan	2 episodes
1983	Hustruskolan	Horace	Television film
1985	Den tragiska historien om Hamlet – Prins av Danmark	Hamlet	Television film
1985	August Strindberg: Ett liv	Verner von Heidenstam	2 episodes
1989	The Wild Duck	Gregers Werle	3 episodes
1989	Förhöret	Carl Hamilton	Television film
1990	S*M*A*S*H	Statssekreteraren	Episode: "Wow, håll käften!"
1990	Parker Kane	Nathan Van Adams	Television film
1994	Rapport till himlen	Gary	4 episodes
1997	The Kingdom II	Stig Helmer's advokat	Episode: "Gargantua"
2000	Harlan County War	Warren Jakopovich	Television film
2001	D-dag – Den færdige film	Lise's Mand	Television film
2003	Helen of Troy	Theseus	Television film
2008	Masterpiece Contemporary	Baumgarten	Episode: "God on Trial"
2008	Entourage	Verner Vollstedt	3 episodes
2010	Arn	Birger Brosa	6 episodes
2012	Rouge Brésil	Villegagnon	4 episodes
2012	Playhouse Presents	The Man	Episode: "The Man"
2014	Quarry	The Broker	Unaired pilot
2015	River	John River	6 episodes
2019	Chernobyl	Boris Shcherbina	5 episodes
2020	The Simpsons	Himself	Voice; episode: "Podcast News"
2022–2025	Andor	Luthen Rael	Main role; 18 episodes
2026	Saturday Night Live	Actor in Stench of a Family / Heiki's father	Episode: "Alexander Skarsgård/Cardi B"

=== Video games ===
Year	Title	Role	Notes
2026	Ontos	TBA	

== Awards and nominations ==
Award	Year	Category	Film	Result	Ref.
AARP Movies for Grownups Awards	2026	Best Supporting Actor	Sentimental Value	Nominated	
Academy Awards	2026	Best Supporting Actor	Sentimental Value	Nominated	
Astra Film Awards	2026	Best Supporting Actor – Drama	Sentimental Value	Won	
Astra Film Awards	2026	Best Cast Ensemble	Sentimental Value	Nominated	
Astra TV Awards	2024	Best Supporting Actor in a Streaming Series, Drama	Andor	Nominated	
Berlin International Film Festival	1982	Best Actor	The Simple-Minded Murderer	Won	
Bodil Awards	2014	Bodil Award for Best Actor	Nymphomaniac	Nominated	
British Academy Television Awards	2020	Best Supporting Actor	Chernobyl	Nominated	
Denmark's National Association of Film Critics	2004	Best Supporting Actor	Dogville	Nominated	
Critics' Choice Television Awards	2020	Best Supporting Actor in a Limited Series or Television Movie	Chernobyl	Won	
European Film Awards	1998	European Achievement in World Cinema	Amistad; Good Will Hunting	Won	
European Film Awards	2000	European Actor	Aberdeen	Nominated	
European Film Awards	2001	European Actor	Taking Sides	Nominated	
European Film Awards	2026	European Actor	Sentimental Value	Won	
Fangoria Chainsaw Awards	2006	Best Actor	Dominion: Prequel to the Exorcist	Nominated	
Golden Globe Awards	2020	Best Supporting Actor – Series, Limited Series or Television Film	Chernobyl	Won	
Golden Globe Awards	2026	Best Supporting Actor – Motion Picture	Sentimental Value	Won	
Gotham Independent Film Awards	2025	Outstanding Supporting Performance	Sentimental Value	Nominated	
Guldbagge Awards	1982	Best Actor	The Simple-Minded Murderer	Won	
Guldbagge Awards	1990	Best Actor	Täcknamn Coq Rouge; The Women on the Roof	Won	
Guldbagge Awards	2018	Best Supporting Actor	Borg McEnroe	Won	
International Press Academy	2008	Best Actor – Miniseries or Television Film	God on Trial	Nominated	
Jameson Dublin International Film Festival	2012	Career Achievement Award	–	Won	
Karlovy Vary International Film Festival	2025	Crystal Globe for Outstanding Artistic Contribution to World Cinema		Honoured	
Mar del Plata Film Festival	2002	Best Actor	Taking Sides	Won	
Norwegian International Film Festival	2010	Best Actor	A Somewhat Gentle Man	Won	
Palm Springs International Film Festival	2026	International Star Award	Sentimental Value	Honored (Note: Shared with Renate Reinsve, Inga Ibsdotter Lilleaas and Elle Fanning.)	
Peabody Awards	2022	Entertainment	Andor	Won	
People's Choice Awards	2009	Favorite Cast	Mamma Mia!	Nominated	
Primetime Emmy Awards	2019	Outstanding Supporting Actor in a Limited Series or Movie	Chernobyl	Nominated	
Robert Award	2004	Best Supporting Actor	Dogville	Nominated	
Santa Barbara International Film Festival	2026	Montecito Award	Sentimental Value	Honored	
Sarajevo Film Festival	2025	Honorary Heart of Sarajevo Award	Lifetime achievement	Honored	
Satellite Awards	2020	Best Supporting Actor in a Series, Miniseries or TV Film	Chernobyl	Nominated	
Screen Actors Guild Awards	1998	Outstanding Performance by a Cast in a Motion Picture	Good Will Hunting	Nominated	

== See also ==
- List of Nordic Academy Award winners and nominees
- List of actors nominated for Academy Awards for non-English performances
- List of atheists in film, radio, television and theater
