= 25th Guldbagge Awards =

Annual Swedish film awards ceremony

- Date: 5 February 1990
- Site: Berns salonger, Stockholm, Sweden

Highlights
- Best Picture: The Miracle in Valby

The 25th Guldbagge Awards ceremony, presented by the Swedish Film Institute, honored the best Swedish films of 1989, and took place on 5 February 1990. The Miracle in Valby directed by Åke Sandgren was presented with the award for Best Film.

== Awards ==
- Best Film: The Miracle in Valby by Åke Sandgren
- Best Director: Åke Sandgren for The Miracle in Valby
- Best Actor: Stellan Skarsgård for Codename Coq Rouge and The Women on the Roof
- Best Actress: Viveka Seldahl for S/Y Joy
- Best Screenplay: Åke Sandgren and Stig Larsson for The Miracle in Valby
- Best Cinematography: Göran Nilsson for Codename Coq Rouge
- Best Foreign Language Film: A World Apart by Chris Menges
- Creative Achievement:
  - Stefan Jarl
  - Björn Isfält
  - Per Åhlin
