= The People of Hemsö =

Book by August Strindberg

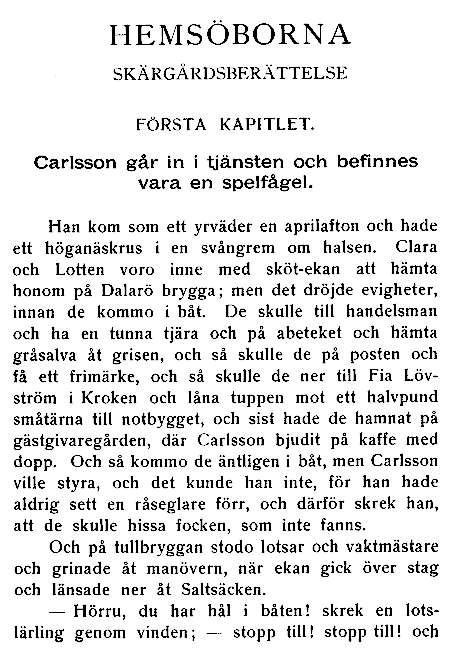
- Beginning of the first chapter
- Author: August Strindberg
- Original title: Hemsöborna
- Language: Swedish
- Published: 1887
- Publication place: Sweden

The People of Hemsö (Swedish: Hemsöborna) is an 1887 novel by August Strindberg about the life of people of the island Hemsö in the Stockholm archipelago. Hemsö is a fictional island, but it is based on Kymmendö where Strindberg had spent time in his youth. Strindberg wrote the book to combat his homesickness while living abroad in Germany and France.

Written during a difficult period in exile from Sweden, the novel paradoxically has a strong sense of place, and is a feat of straightforward folksy storytelling.

== Plot ==
Mrs. Anna Eva Flod, a widow of some means, hires Johannes Edvard Carlsson to run the farm on the island. As a newcomer and a landlubber among sailors and fishermen, Carlsson is implicitly distrusted by the locals as they try to discern whether Carlsson is a slippery confidence trickster preying on the lonely widow, or an honest, hard-working man revitalizing the neglected farm.

== Adaptations ==
Strindberg wrote a play based on the novel in 1887.

The first screen adaptation was the 1919 silent film Hemsöborna. The 1944 film The People of Hemsö was adapted from the novel. In 1955, another film based on the novel premiered.

In 1966, Sveriges Television premiered the television series Hemsöborna directed by Bengt Lagerkvist and starring Sif Ruud, Allan Edwall and Sven Wollter. This adaptation was very well received in Sweden.

== Sources ==
- Meyer, Michael. 1985. Strindberg: A Biography. Oxford Lives series. Oxford: Oxford University Press, 1987. ISBN 0-19-281995-X.
