= Münsters fall =

2005 film by Rickard Petrelius

Van Veeteren – Münsters fall
- Directed by: Rickard Petrelius
- Screenplay by: Björn Carlström; Mårten Skogman; Stefan Thunberg
- Based on: Münsters fall by Håkan Nesser
- Produced by: Jan Marnell
- Starring: Sven Wollter; Thomas Hanzon; Eva Rexed
- Cinematography: Rolf Lindström
- Edited by: Jan-Olof Svarvar
- Music by: Stefan Nilsson
- Production company: AB Svensk Filmindustri
- Release date: 14 December 2005 (Sweden)
- Running time: 90 minutes
- Country: Sweden
- Language: Swedish

Münsters fall, also released as Van Veeteren – Münsters fall, is a 2005 Swedish crime thriller film directed by Rickard Petrelius. It is based on Håkan Nesser's novel Münsters fall, part of the Inspector Van Veeteren series, and stars Sven Wollter, Thomas Hanzon and Eva Rexed.

== Premise ==
After wealthy wine merchant Waldemar Leverkuhn is killed, Münster leads the investigation while the retired Van Veeteren remains involved in the case.

== Release ==
The film was released direct to video in Sweden, with a Swedish DVD premiere on 14 December 2005.

== Reception ==
Filmdienst described the film as the second crime film in a six-part series of adaptations of Nesser's Van Veeteren novels. TV Spielfilm gave the film a positive editorial rating and wrote that, after a slow start, it developed more tension and a stronger profile than the previous instalment. Daniel Hofverberg of Dubbningshemsidan reviewed the film as well made and watchable, but also described it as a conventional crime drama.
