= The Mind's Eye (novel) =

1993 novel by Håkan Nesser

- First edition (Swedish)
- Author: Håkan Nesser
- Original title: Det grovmaskiga nätet
- Translator: Laurie Thompson
- Cover artist: Ilona Wellmann / Millenium Images, UK.
- Language: Swedish
- Series: Inspector Van Veteeren
- Genre: Crime, Mystery novel
- Publisher: Albert Bonniers Förlag
- Publication date: 1993
- Publication place: Sweden
- Media type: Print (Hardback)
- ISBN: 978-0-333-98986-9
- OCLC: 269433100
- Followed by: Borkmann's Point

The Mind's Eye (Swedish: Det grovmaskiga nätet) is a 1993 novel by Håkan Nesser in the Van Veeteren series, translated into English in 2008 by Laurie Thompson. Nesser was awarded the 1993 Swedish Crime Writers' Academy Prize for new authors for this novel.

A two-episode TV series based on the novel was produced in 2000, Det grovmaskiga nätet.
