= Göran Nilsson (cinematographer) =

Swedish cinematographer (1946–2012)

- Born: 16 July 1946; Stockholm, Sweden
- Died: 30 December 2012 (aged 66)
- Occupation: Cinematographer
- Years active: 1980-2000

Göran Nilsson (16 July 1946 – 30 December 2012) was a Swedish cinematographer. At the 25th Guldbagge Awards he won the award for Best Cinematography for the film Codename Coq Rouge. At the 29th Guldbagge Awards he was nominated for the same award for the film The Slingshot. He worked on more than 20 films and television shows between 1980 and 2000.

== Selected filmography ==
- Second Dance (1983)
- Lethal Film (1988)
- Codename Coq Rouge (1989)
- The Guardian Angel (1990)
- The Slingshot (1993)
- Credo (1997)
