= Stina Wollter =

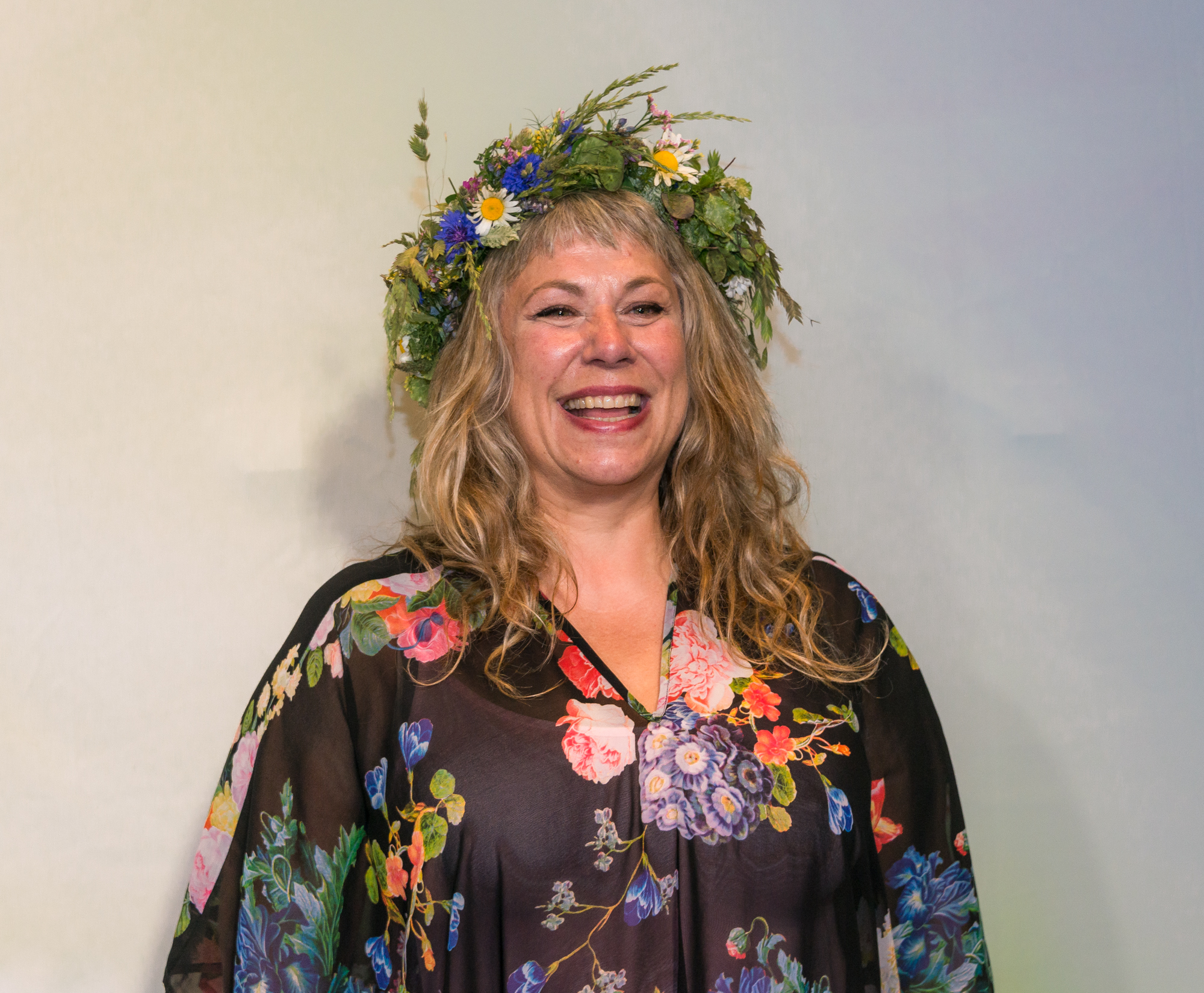
- Wollter in 2019
- Born: Stina Margareta Ulrika Wollter; 24 May 1964 (age 61); Sollentuna, Sweden
- Occupations: Artist, television presenter, author
- Spouses: Pär Meiling (m. 1986–1990) Micke Olsson Wollter (m. 2018)
- Children: 2
- Parent(s): Sven Wollter; Annie Jenhoff
- Relatives: Karl Seldahl (half brother); Karl-Anders Wollter (uncle)

Stina Margareta Ulrika Wollter (born 24 May 1964) is a Swedish artist, television presenter and author. She is the daughter of actor Sven Wollter.

Wollter works mostly as an artist but also does illustration, speaker and radio presenting. She presents the radio show Söndagarna med Stina Wollter on P4 Stockholm for Sveriges Radio. She has also presented the radio show Karlavagnen. She has competed in the SVT show På spåret along with her father. She has also performed music in 2014 she started the band Stina Wollter Band which plays country music and her husband Micke Olsson Wollter plays the guitar.

Wollter studied in KV Konstskola an art school in Gothenburg between 1980 and 1981, and Konstindustriskolan between 1981 and 1983. After that she studied arts at Nordiska konstskolan in Finland between 1983 and 1984, and between late 1984 and 1987 at the Gerlesborgsskolan in Bohuslän.

She competed in the celebrity dancing show Let's Dance 2017 broadcast on TV4.

== Filmography ==
- 1983 – Profitörerna
