= Håkan Nesser =

Swedish author and teacher (born 1950)

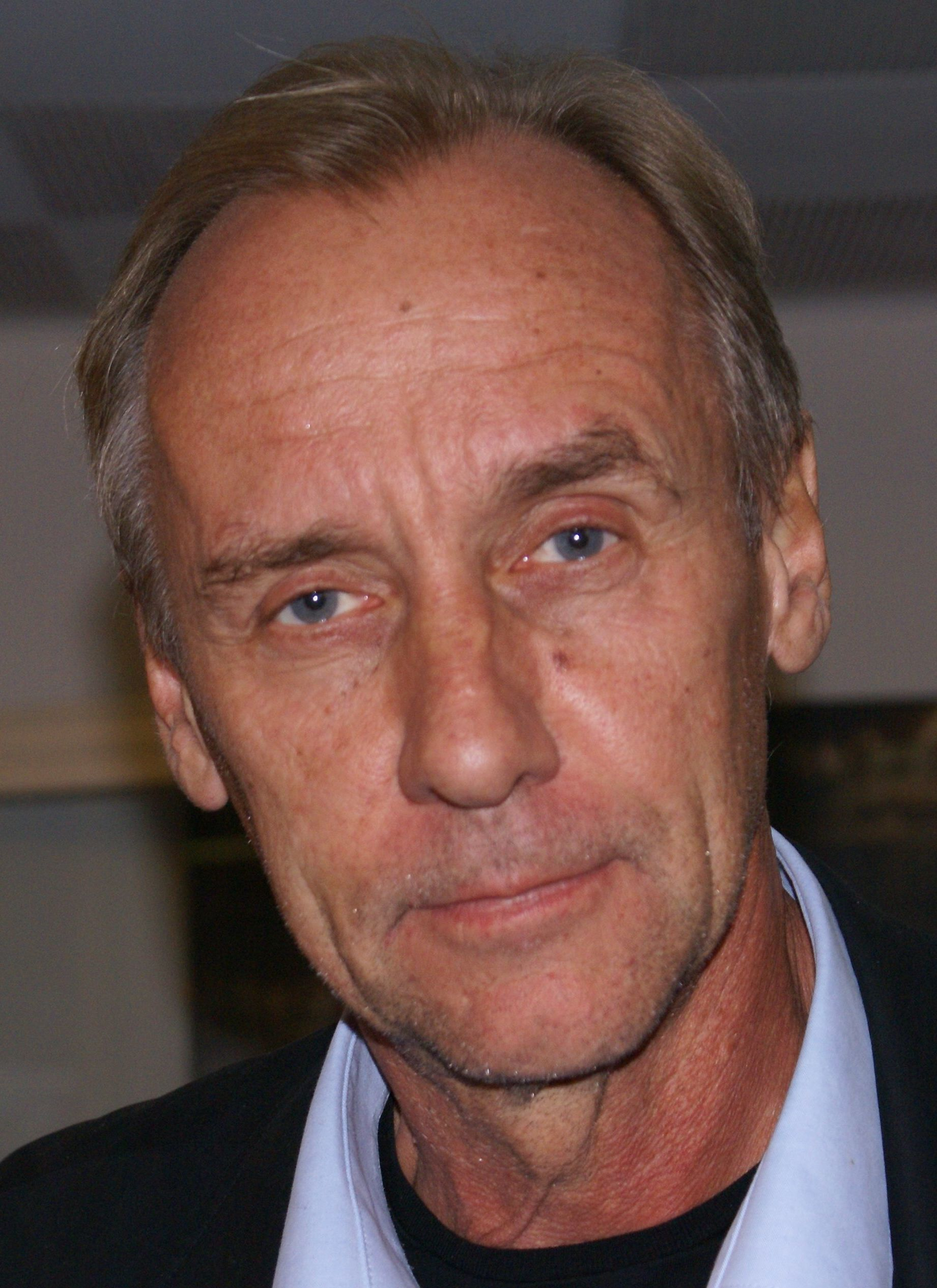
- Nesser in 2009
- Born: 21 February 1950 (age 76); Kumla, Örebro County, Sweden
- Writing career
- Years active: 1998–present
- Genre: Crime fiction
- Notable awards: Best Swedish Crime Novel Award; Glass Key award H. M. The King's Medal
- Website: nesser.se

Håkan Nesser (born 21 February 1950) is a Swedish author and teacher who mainly writes crime fiction. He has won Best Swedish Crime Novel Award three times, and his novel Carambole won the Glass Key award in 2000. His books have been translated from Swedish into more than twenty languages.

== Early life ==
Håkan Nesser was born and grew up in Kumla, Örebro County. His first novel was published in 1988. He worked as a teacher in Uppsala until 1998 when he became a full-time author. In August 2006, Håkan Nesser and his wife Elke (a psychiatrist) moved to Greenwich Village in New York. A few years later, they moved to London since it was easier for his wife to find work there. They now live in Furillen on the island Gotland in the Baltic Sea.

== Criminal conviction ==
On 14 June 2024, Håkan Nesser was sentenced by the Svea Court of Appeal to one year and six months in prison for three counts of aggravated tax evasion. In February 2025, the Supreme Court of Sweden decided to reject Nesser's request for leave to appeal. The crime had come to the attention of the judicial system thanks to the Paradise Papers.

== Characters and themes ==
A recurring main character is named Van Veeteren, a detective in the early novels and later the owner of an antique books shop. These books play out in a fictitious city named Maardam, said to be located in northern Europe in a country which is never named but resembles Sweden, the Netherlands, Poland and Germany. The names however are mostly Dutch.

With his 2006 crime novel Människa utan hund ("Human without Dog") Nesser introduced a new main character, Inspector Gunnar Barbarotti, a Swedish police inspector of Italian descent. He has remained the main protagonist in Nesser's crime books since then. Barbarotti is a more upbeat character than Van Veeteren and the books are firmly set in Sweden, although the town of Kymlinge is fictitious and named after an "abandoned tube station" in Stockholm.

In August 2011 he hinted on his own site that a future book (which became The Living and the Dead in Winsford) would take place in the "county of Somerset".

== Bibliography ==
=== Inspector Van Veeteren ===
- 1993 – Det grovmaskiga nätet; English translation: The Mind's Eye, 2008
- 1994 – Borkmanns punkt; English translation: Borkmann's Point, 2006
- 1995 – Återkomsten; English translation: The Return, 2007
- 1996 – Kvinna med födelsemärke; English translation: Woman with Birthmark, 2009
- 1997 – Kommissarien och tystnaden; English translation: The Inspector and Silence, 2010
- 1998 – Münsters fall: English translation: The Unlucky Lottery, 2011 (Münster's Case, USA, 2012)
- 1999 – Carambole; English translation: Hour of the Wolf, 2012
- 2000 – Ewa Morenos fall; English translation: The Weeping Girl, 2013
- 2001 – Svalan, katten, rosen, döden; English translation: The Strangler's Honeymoon, 2013
- 2003 – Fallet G; English translation: The G File, 2014

=== Inspector Barbarotti ===
- 2006 – Människa utan hund; English translation: The Darkest Day, 2017
- 2007 – En helt annan historia; English translation: The Root of Evil, 2018
- 2008 – Berättelse om herr Roos; English translation: The Secret Life of Mr. Roos, 2020
- 2010 – De ensamma'; English translation: The Lonely Ones, 2022
- 2012 – Styckerskan från Lilla Burma'; English translation: The Axe Woman, 2022
- 2020 – Den sorgsne busschauffören från Alster
- 2021 – Schack under vulkanen
- 2023 – Det kom ett brev från München
- 2024 – Ung mans färd mot natt
- 2025 – Det finmaskiga nätet

=== Other novels ===
- 1988 – Koreografen
- 1996 – Barins triangel
- 1998 – Kim Novak badade aldrig i Genesarets sjö; English translation by Saskia Vogel: A Summer with Kim Novak (2015), The Summer of Kim Novak (2020)
- 1999 – Flugan och evigheten
- 2002 – Och Piccadilly Circus ligger inte i Kumla
- 2002 – Kära Agnes!
- 2004 – Skuggorna och regnet
- 2005 – Från doktor Klimkes horisont
- 2005 - Villrosen
- 2009 – Maskarna på Carmine Street
- 2011 – Himmel över London
- 2014 – Levande och döda i Winsford; English translation: The Living and the Dead in Winsford (2015)
- 2016 – Eugen Kallmanns ögon
- 2017 – Nortons filosofiska memoarer; English translation: Norton's Philosophical Memoirs (2018)
- 2018 – INTRIGO (a collection of novellas: Tom (2018); Rein (1996); Dear Agnes (2002); The Flower from Samaria (2005); All the Information in the Case (2005))
- 2018 – De vänsterhäntas förening
- 2019 – Halvmördaran

== Filmography and adaptations ==
- Kim Novak Never Swam in Genesaret's Lake (Kim Novak badade aldrig i Genesarets sjö): A 2005 film directed by Martin Asphaug and starring Anton Lundqvist and Helena af Sandeberg.
- Levande och döda i Winsford, released internationally as Unmoored: A 2023 film directed by Caroline Ingvarsson and starring Mirja Turestedt.
- A series of television and film dramatisations of the Van Veeteren novels starring Sven Wollter:
  - Det grovmaskiga nätet (2000, TV)
  - Återkomsten (2001, TV)
  - Kvinna med födelsemärke (2001, TV)
  - Münsters fall (2005)
  - Carambole (2005)
  - Borkmanns punkt (2005)
  - Moreno och tystnaden (2006)
  - Svalan, katten, rosen, döden (2006)
  - Fallet G (2006)

== Awards ==
- 1994 – Best Swedish Crime Novel Award for Borkmanns punkt
- 1996 – Best Swedish Crime Novel Award for Kvinna med födelsemärke
- 2000 – Glass Key award for Carambole
- 2007 – Best Swedish Crime Novel Award for En helt annan historia
- 2016 – Honorary doctorate from Örebro University
- 2019 – H. M. The King's Medal for his work as an author
