= Codename Coq Rouge =

1989 Swedish film

- Directed by: Per Berglund
- Written by: Jan Guillou; Per Berglund
- Produced by: Peter Hald; Hans Iveberg
- Starring: Stellan Skarsgård
- Cinematography: Göran Nilsson
- Release date: 25 August 1989
- Running time: 90 minutes
- Country: Sweden
- Language: Swedish

Codename Coq Rouge (Swedish: Täcknamn Coq Rouge) is a 1989 Swedish thriller film directed by Per Berglund. Stellan Skarsgård won the award for Best Actor and Göran Nilsson won the award for Best Cinematography at the 25th Guldbagge Awards.

== Cast ==
- Stellan Skarsgård as Carl Hamilton
- Lennart Hjulström as Näslund
- Krister Henriksson as Fristedt
- Philip Zandén as Appeltoft
- Bengt Eklund as Den gamle
- Lars Green as Ponti
- Roland Hedlund as Folkesson
- Anette Kischinowsky as Fatumeh
- Nick Burnell as Meyer
- Harald Hamrell as Johansson
- Tjadden Hällström as Ljungdahl (as Lars 'Tjadden' Hällström)
- Tove Granditsky as Shulamit Hanegbi (as Tove Granditsky-Svenson)
- Lena T. Hansson as Eva Hamilton
- Gustaf Skarsgård as Erik Hamilton
