= Viveka Seldahl =

Swedish actress

- Born: Viveka Kristina Seldahl; 15 March 1944; Överammer, Sweden
- Died: 3 November 2001 (aged 57); Stockholm, Sweden
- Occupation: Actress
- Years active: 1967–2001
- Partner: Sven Wollter (1971–2001)
- Children: Karl Seldahl

Viveka Kristina Seldahl (15 March 1944 – 3 November 2001) was a Swedish actor.

Born in Överammer, Jämtland, she was partner with the Swedish actor Sven Wollter from 1971 to 2001, they have the son Karl Seldahl.

Besides doing television series and films, she worked at Stockholm City Theatre.

At the 25th Guldbagge Awards she won the award for Best Actress for her role in S/Y Joy.

Seldahl died from cervical cancer in Stockholm in 2001.

== Filmography ==
Year	Title	Role	Notes
1976	Raskens	Nergårds-Anna	5 episodes
1989	S/Y Joy	Maja-Lena Skoog	
1992	House of Angels	Rut Flogfält	
1993	För brinnande livet	Kvinnan	
1994	House of Angels – The Second Summer	Rut Flogfält	
1995	Alfred	Paulina Nobel	
1996	Harry och Sonja	Sonja	
1996	Jerusalem	Stina	
1996	Juloratoriet	Fanny Udde	
1999	Vägen ut	Hillevi	
1999	Lusten till ett liv	Maja	
1999	Mamy Blue	Lena	
2001	A Song for Martin	Barbara	
2002	I Am Dina	The Widow	Released posthumously
