= Sven Wollter =

Swedish actor, writer, and political activist (1934–2020)

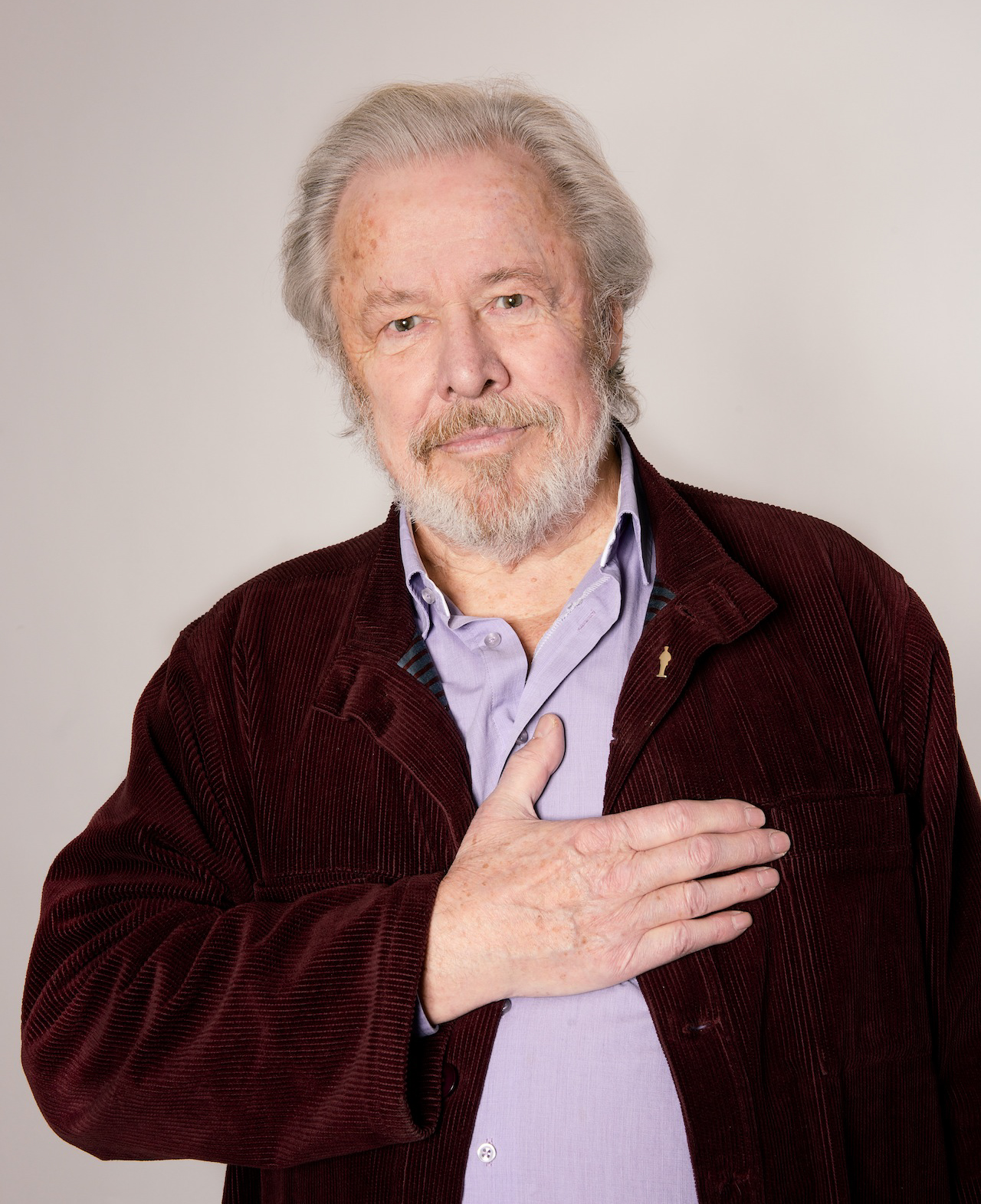
- Sven Wollter in 2014.
- Born: Sven Justus Fredrik Wollter; 11 January 1934; Gothenburg, Sweden
- Died: 10 November 2020 (aged 86); Luleå, Sweden
- Occupation: Actor
- Years active: 1966–2020
- Spouses: Maja-Brita Mossberg; (m. 1956–1958) Annie Jenhoff (m. 1960–1967): Lisa Wede; (m. 2003)
- Partner(s): Evabritt Strandberg (engage 1966–1970); Viveka Seldahl (1971–2001; her death); Maria Lindgren
- Children: Ylva (with Jenhoff); Stina (with Jenhoff); Lina (with Strandberg); Karl (with Seldahl); Magnus (with Lindgren)
- Relatives: Karl-Anders Wollter (brother); Christopher Wollter (grandnephew)

Sven Justus Fredrik Wollter (11 January 1934 – 10 November 2020) was a Swedish actor, writer, and political activist. Wollter is one of the most renowned Swedish actors, he was awarded Best Swedish actor twice. In his native country, he became widely known through his role as Madame Flod's son Gusten in Swedish Television's adaption of The People of Hemsö by August Strindberg in 1966. Later he had several notable roles, including in 1976 when he played Detective Sergeant Lennart Kollberg in Bo Widerberg's film The Man on the Roof. For international viewers, he is best known for his role Victor in the dramatic film The Sacrifice by Andrei Tarkovsky, and for a wider television audience as the retired Detective Chief Inspector Van Veeteren in the cinematic adaptations of Håkan Nesser's police novels.

== Biography ==
Sven Wollter was born in Gothenburg, Sweden. He was the son of editor Kjell Wollter (1884–1950) and Elsa, née Ekwall (1905–1980). After studying at Gothenburg City Theatre's student school 1953–1957, Wollter worked at a number of smaller Swedish theaters such as the Pionjärteatern 1954-1958 and the Bygdeteatern 1959. He was later employed at the National Swedish Touring Theatre 1960–1961, The Norrköping City Theatre 1961–1963, The Vasateatern 1964–1966 and The Swedish Television Theatre 1966–1967. He then returned to The Gothenburg City Theater where he performed 1967–1983, then at the Folkteatern i Gävleborg 1983–1986 followed by The Stockholm City Theatre as of 1986.

Wollter starred in many films such as Andrei Tarkovsky's The Sacrifice (1986), Bo Widerberg's The Man on the Roof (1976) and The Man from Majorca (1984), Colin Nutley's House of Angels (1992), and Bille August's Jerusalem (1996), based on the novel by Selma Lagerlöf. For his roles in The Man from Majorca and Sista leken he won the award for Best Actor at the 20th Guldbagge Awards.

He appeared in television series such as Hemsöborna (1966), based on the 1887 novel of the same name by August Strindberg, and Raskens (1976), based on the 1927 novel of the same name by Vilhelm Moberg, which helped launch Wollter's career. In later years he has played Van Veeteren in Håkan Nesser's thriller series. He has also been in many plays. Wollter has starred in Hollywood productions such as John McTiernan's The 13th Warrior (1999), in which he played a Viking chief.

== Political activism ==
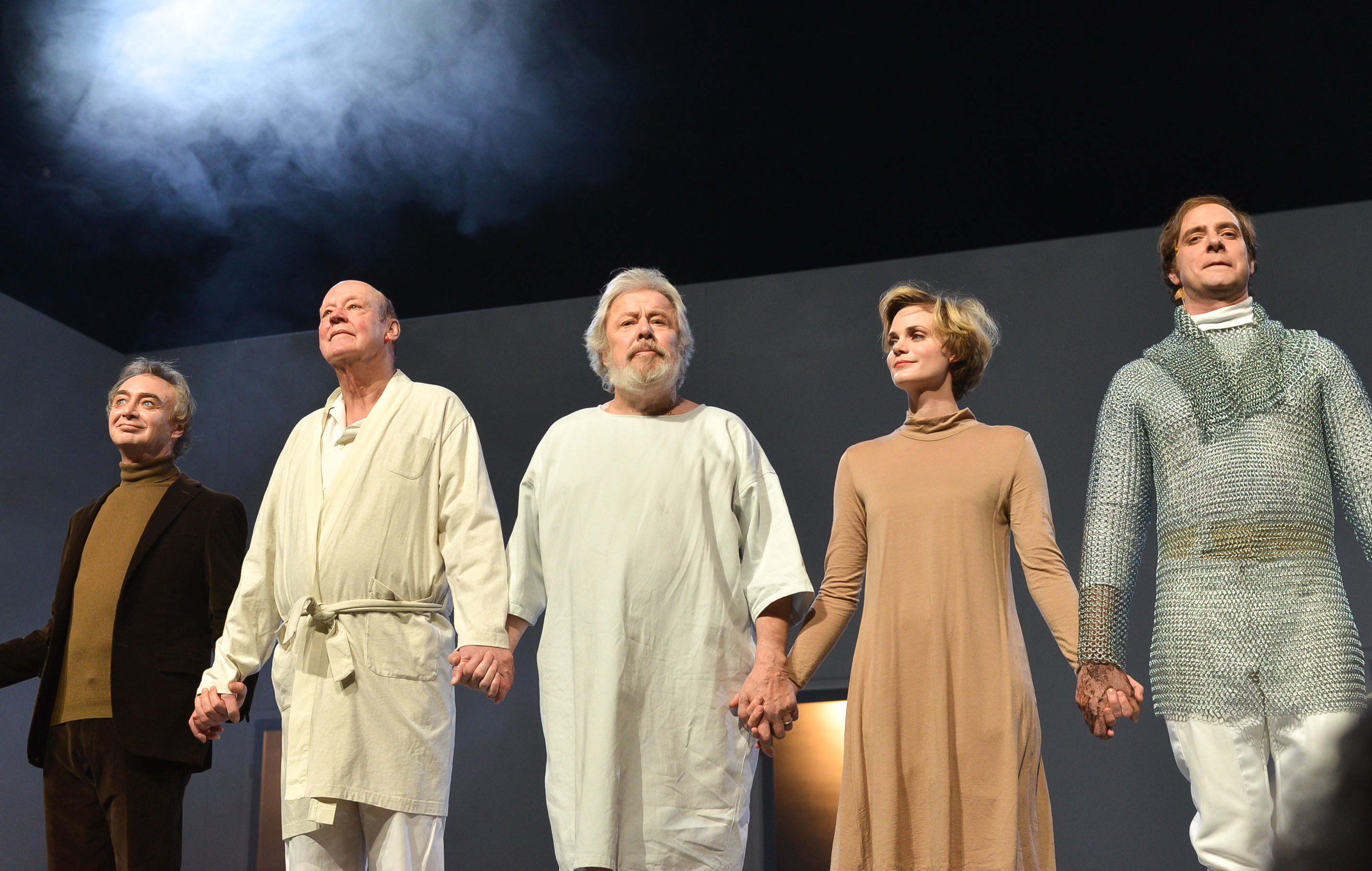
Wollter as King Lear on 8 January 2014 at his final stage performance, at The Stockholm City Theatre, From left: Mats Qviström, Sten Ljunggren, Sven Wolter, Liv Mjönes, and Andreas Kundler

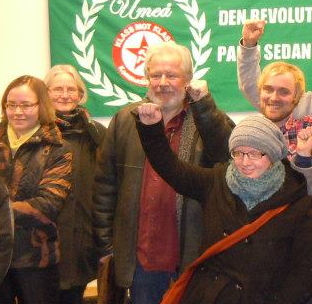
Wollter with progressive activists after delivering a speech "What does Communism want?" in 2013 at the People's Palace in Umeå

Wollter was active in the Swedish communist movement since his youth and was a longtime member of the Swedish Marxist–Leninist Communist Party (formerly KPML(r)). His activities included the theatre ensemble Fria Proteatern and the successful Tältprojektet, The Tent Project, a musical theatre performance based on the history of the Swedish working class that toured the country the summer of 1977. In 2018, he received the controversial Lenin Award of 100,000 Swedish krona (about 10,000 euro), a cultural award named after Vladimir Lenin.

== Personal life ==
Wollter had five children; Ylva (1962–1992) and Stina Wollter (born 1964) together with Annie Jenhoff, Lina Wollter together with Evabritt Strandberg, Karl Seldahl (born 1975) together with Viveka Seldahl and the youngest child Magnus together with Maria Lindgren. From 2003 until his death he was married to Lisa Wede.

== Death ==
Wollter died on 10 November 2020, in Luleå, Sweden, from complications caused by COVID-19 which he had been infected by during a visit to Stockholm. Prior to contracting the coronavirus, Wollter was diagnosed with COPD according to his daughter Stina Wollter. He was 86 years old.

== Filmography ==
- 1959: Rider in Blue as Press Photographer (uncredited)
- 1966: Hemsöborna (TV Mini Series) as Gusten
- 1967: I Am Curious (Yellow) as Captain (uncredited)
- 1968: Jag älskar, du älskar as Sten
- 1969: Nej (Short)
- 1973: Ett köpmanshus i skärgården (TV Series) as Janne
- 1974: Rymmare (TV Movie) as Klas
- 1975: Gyllene år (TV Series) as Björn Bjurhoff
- 1975: The White Wall as Kjell Larsson
- 1976: Raskens (TV Series) as Gustav 'Raskens' Rask
- 1976: The Man on the Roof as Lennart Kollberg
- 1978: Strandfyndet (TV Series) as Direktör Sallberg
- 1979: Linus eller Tegelhusets hemlighet as Daniel
- 1979: Charlotte Löwensköld as Foundry Proprietor Schagerström
- 1981: Sista budet as Police Inspector
- 1981: Kallocain (TV Mini Series) as Leo Kall
- 1983: Jacob Smitaren as Doctor
- 1983: Profitörerna (TV Series) as Jarnebring
- 1984: Sista leken as Viktor
- 1984: The Man from Majorca as Inspector Jarnebring
- 1985: Havlandet as Matti
- 1986: The Sacrifice as Victor
- 1986: I lagens namn as Jarnebring
- 1987: En film om kärlek as Peter
- 1987: Friends as Zeb
- 1988: Ein Treffen mit Rimbaud as Hinrich
- 1988: Enkel resa as Johannes
- 1988: Sweetwater as Doc
- 1989: Husbonden – piraten på Sandön (TV Movie) as Peter
- 1989-1991: Tre kärlekar (TV Series) as Eskil Enekrona
- 1990: Smykketyven as Jan Ström
- 1991: Menekse Koyu as Kerem
- 1992: House of Angels as Axel Flogfält
- 1993: Dockpojken as Fadern
- 1994: House of Angels – The Second Summer as Axel Flogfält
- 1995: Alfred as Alfred Nobel
- 1996: Jerusalem as Stor-Ingmar
- 1997: Oliver & Company as Sykes (voice in Swedish redub)
- 1998: The Tattooed Widow (TV Movie) as Erik Sandström
- 1998: Ögat as Poliskommissarien
- 1998: Ivar Kreuger (TV Series) as Häradshövding Wallenberg
- 1999: The 13th Warrior as King Hrothgar
- 1999: Sally (TV Series) as Rolf 'Roffe' Santesson
- 2000: Det grovmaskiga nätet (TV Series) as Van Veeteren
- 2000: A Song for Martin as Martin
- 2001: Kaspar i Nudådalen (TV Series) as Perols Erik
- 2001: Återkomsten as Van Veeteren
- 2001: Kvinna med födelsemärke (TV Series) as Van Veeteren
- 2001: Kira's Reason: A Love Story as Kira's Father
- 2002: Suxxess as Sigvard
- 2002: Dieselråttor & sjömansmöss as Mäster Estragon
- 2002: Treasure Planet as John Silver (voice in Swedish dub)
- 2005: Molly i världen as The narrator
- 2005: Van Veeteren – Carambole as Van Veeteren
- 2005: Störst av allt as Aron P Johansson
- 2005: Van Veeteren – Münsters fall as Van Veeteren
- 2005: Van Veeteren – Borkmanns punkt as Van Veeteren
- 2006: Van Veeteren – Moreno och tystnaden as Van Veeteren
- 2006: Sigillet as Vete von Vanders
- 2006: Van Veeteren – Svalan, Katten, Rosen, Döden as Van Veeteren
- 2006: Van Veeteren – Fallet G as Van Veeteren
- 2007: Elias: The Little Rescue Boat as The Royal Yacht (Swedish version, voice)
- 2009: Gnomes and Trolls: The Secret Chamber (Swedish dub) as Fassa (voice)
- 2010: House of Angels – Third Time Lucky as Axel Flogfält
- 2012: Flimmer as Barnard
- 2012: Samlaren (Short) as Lennart
- 2015: Våga älska as Piloten
- 2017: Solsidan as Maurtiz Schiller
- 2018: Videomannen as Grannen - The Neighbor
- 2022: The House as Odd Couple Husband (released posthumously; final film role)
