= The Women on the Roof =

- Directed by: Carl-Gustav Nykvist
- Written by: Carl-Gustav Nykvist; Lasse Summanen
- Produced by: Waldemar Bergendahl
- Starring: Amanda Ooms; Helena Bergström
- Cinematography: Ulf Brantås
- Edited by: Lasse Summanen
- Release date: 15 September 1989
- Running time: 89 minutes
- Country: Sweden
- Language: Swedish

The Women on the Roof (Swedish: Kvinnorna på taket) is a 1989 Swedish film written and directed by Carl-Gustav Nykvist. It stars Amanda Ooms and Helena Bergström. It was entered into the 1989 Cannes Film Festival. At the 25th Guldbagge Awards, Stellan Skarsgård won the award for Best Actor. The film was selected as the Swedish entry for the Best Foreign Language Film at the 62nd Academy Awards, but was not accepted as a nominee.

== Plot ==
An innocent and beautiful girl, Linnea (Amanda Ooms) rents an apartment in Stockholm just before World War I. As she works for an old man who owns a photography studio she meets Anna, a photographer (Helena Bergstrom) with whom she develops a complex friendship. Anna's circus-performer boyfriend and European politics complicate Linnea's routine.

== Cast ==
- Amanda Ooms - Linnea
- Helena Bergström - Anna
- Stellan Skarsgård - Willy
- Percy Brandt - Fischer
- Lars Ori Bäckström - Holger
- Katarina Olsson - Gerda
- Leif Andrée - Oskar
- Stig Ossian Ericson - Vicar
- Johan Bergenstråhle - Photographer Halling

== See also ==
- List of submissions to the 62nd Academy Awards for Best Foreign Language Film
- List of Swedish submissions for the Academy Award for Best Foreign Language Film
