= Inger Alfvén =

Swedish author and sociologist (1940–2022)

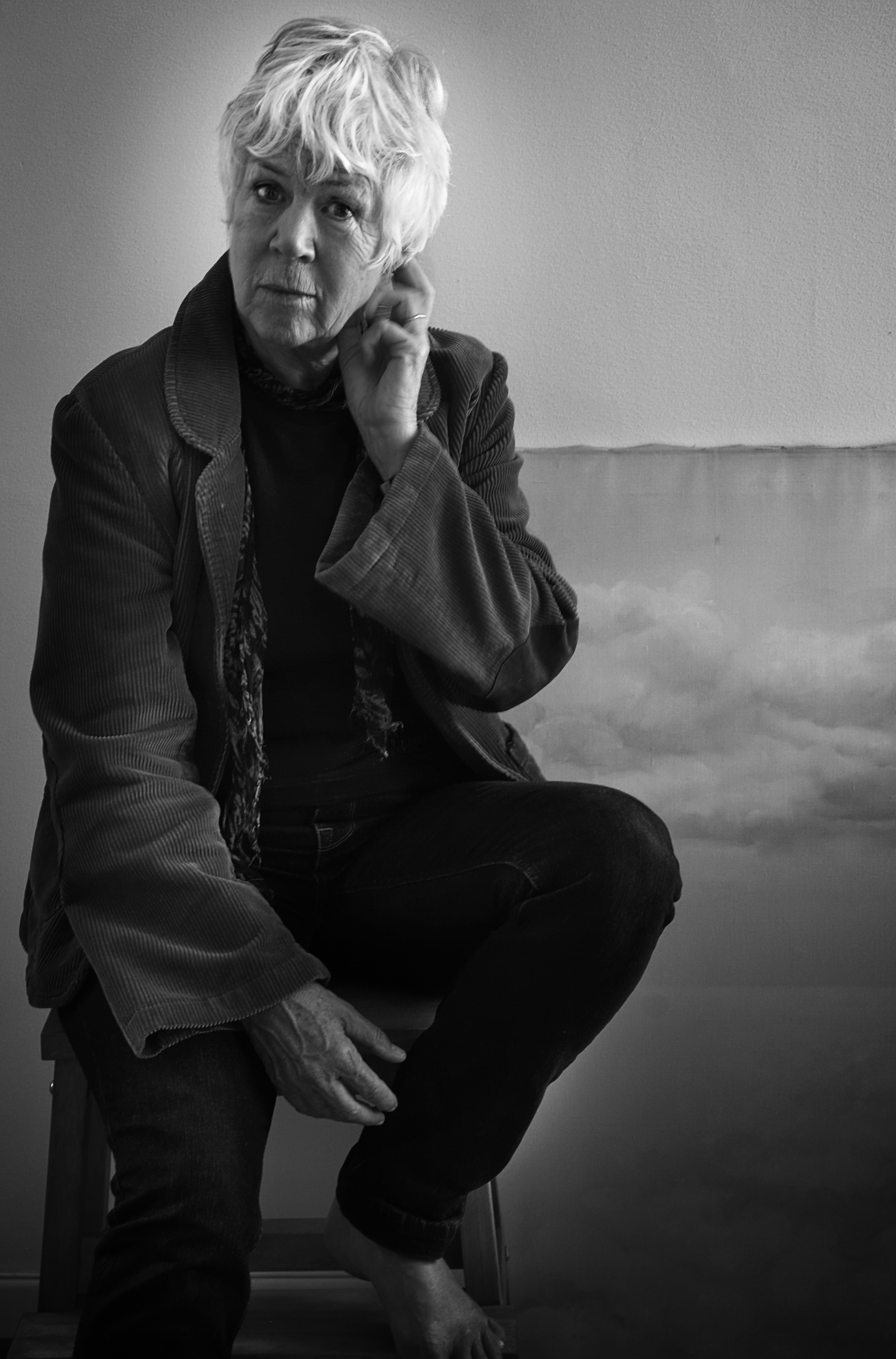
- Inger Alfvén
- Born: 24 February 1940; Solna, Stockholm County, Sweden
- Died: 26 July 2022 (aged 82)
- Citizenship: Sweden
- Occupation(s): Author and sociologist
- Father: Hannes Alfvén

Inger Maria Alfvén (24 February 1940 – 26 July 2022) was a Swedish author and sociologist from Solna in Stockholm County.

== Biography ==
Alfvén became a sociologist in 1964 and worked as a counselor.

Her books depict existential and moral conflicts such as inherited gender roles, love, lifelong friendship, and loneliness. She had her big breakthrough with the novel S/Y Glädjen in 1979.

In 2002, Alfvén made her debut as a playwright with the play The Rainbow's Root (Regnbågens rot), which is about three sisters' lives and development during the last decades of the last century.

Her books consisted often of what moves through human consciousness.

=== Family ===
Alfvén was married for the first time in 1962–1980 to medical licentiate Mikael von Heijne (born 1941), the second time from 1985 to 1991 to the author Lars-Olof Franzén (born 1936), and the third time from 1993 to the psychiatrist Johan Cullberg (born 1934).

She was the daughter of physics professor and Nobel laureate Hannes Alfvén and a grandniece of composer Hugo Alfvén.

== Works ==
=== Writing ===
- 1964 – Vinbergssnäckan
- 1969 – Tusentals äpplen
- 1971 – Lena-Bell
- 1972 – Ta ner månen
- 1976 – Städpatrullen
- 1977 – Dotter till en dotter
- 1979 – S/Y Glädjen (filmed in 1989)
- 1981 – Arvedelen
- 1984 – Ur kackerlackors levnad
- 1986 – Lyckans galosch
- 1989 – Judiths teater (also filmed as a TV series, Judith)
- 1992 – Elefantens öga
- 1992 – Kvinnornas svarta bok
- 1992 – Sex kvinnors lusta
- 1994 – En moder har fyra döttrar
- 1997 – Berget dit fjärilarna flyger för att dö
- 1998 – När jag tänker på pengar
- 1999 – Det blå skåpet
- 2002 – Någon kom i båten (written and filmed in 2002 as Vier Töchter)
- 2004 – Livets vatten
- 2006 – Mandelkärnan
- 2009 – När förnuftet sover
- 2012 – Allt vi aldrig gjorde med varandra
- 2015 – Berör mig inte, berör mig
- 2019 – Tvilling

=== Producing ===
- 2011 – When God Is Watching Us

== Awards ==
- 1978 – TCO Culture Prize
- 2001 – Signe Ekblad-Eldh Prize
- 2006 – The Nine Special Prize Society
- 2012 – Moa Prize
- 2012 – Eric and Ingrid Lilliehöök's scholarship
