= The Return (Nesser novel) =

1995 novel by Håkan Nesser

- First edition (Swedish)
- Author: Håkan Nesser
- Original title: Återkomsten
- Translator: Laurie Thompson
- Language: Swedish
- Series: Inspector Van Veteeren
- Genre: Crime, Mystery novel
- Publisher: Albert Bonniers Förlag
- Publication date: 1995
- Publication place: Sweden
- Media type: Print (Hardback & Paperback)
- ISBN: 0-333-98985-6
- OCLC: 166622765
- Preceded by: Borkmann's Point
- Followed by: Woman with Birthmark

The Return (Swedish: Återkomsten) is a 1995 novel by Håkan Nesser, translated into English in 2007 by Laurie Thompson.
