= Woman with Birthmark =

1996 novel by Håkan Nesser

- First edition (Swedish)
- Author: Håkan Nesser
- Original title: Kvinna med födelsemärke
- Language: Swedish
- Series: Inspector Van Veteeren
- Genre: Crime, Mystery novel
- Publisher: Albert Bonniers Förlag
- Publication date: 1996
- Publication place: Sweden
- Media type: Print (Hardback & Paperback)
- ISBN: 978-0-333-98987-6
- OCLC: 305152870
- Preceded by: The Return

Woman with Birthmark (Kvinna med födelsemärke) is a 1996 novel by Håkan Nesser, which won the Best Swedish Crime Novel Award in the same year. The English translation was published in 2009.

It was also made into a Swedish mini-series for TV in 2001.
