= Borkmann's Point =

1994 novel by Håkan Nesser

- First edition
- Author: Håkan Nesser
- Original title: Borkmanns punkt
- Translator: Laurie Thompson
- Language: Swedish
- Series: Inspector Van Veeteren
- Genre: Crime novel
- Publisher: Albert Bonniers Förlag
- Publication date: 1994
- Publication place: Sweden
- Media type: Print (Hardback & Paperback)
- ISBN: 0-333-98984-8
- OCLC: 70671139
- Preceded by: The Mind's Eye (novel)
- Followed by: The Return

Borkmann's Point (Swedish: Borkmanns punkt) is a prize-winning crime novel by Swedish writer Håkan Nesser, first published in Sweden in 1994 and translated into English by Laurie Thompson in 2006.

== Plot ==
The novel is set in the early 1990s when Chief Inspector Van Veeteren, a 30-year veteran of police work who appreciates fine food and drink, cuts short his vacation to help the police chief of the remote town of Kaalbringen and his small crew investigate two ax murders. Another identical murder occurs in the weeks leading up to the retirement of Police Chief Bausen and it's expected that solving them would not only complete their work while Van Veeteren is available, but would be a high point for Bausen's career exit. Bausen is determined that the cases are solved quickly and the public is safe again before he departs.

At a loose end in Kaalbringen, Van Veeteren accepts Bausen's collegial hospitality. A widower, Bausen generously shares from his expensive wine cellar and together they draw close over a love of chess. The sympathetic Van Veeteren wants to resolve the difficult investigation for his old friend's sake, which Bausen also appreciates.

The problem is that the killings are random with the victims completely unrelated, and the murderer is too clever to be found or even noticed. Significantly the corpses are discovered axed precisely in the same way with a butcher's chopper which shows the killer's attention to detail. Just when it seems that the Ax Murderer – so dubbed by the press – is on a roll, the killings stop at three. The work to find a connecting thread is shared by a crew that includes Beate Moerk, a dedicated, single female colleague with dreams of becoming a private detective; Münster, a detective whose career is creating cracks in his marriage and family life; and others like the nerdish Kropke who bring their professional skills as well as their personality traits to bear. All strive to solve the puzzle as time runs out, especially when Beate Moerk goes missing while jogging late at night.

== Title ==
The title of the work refers to a tipping point in the solving of crimes as proposed by an admired senior colleague of Van Veeteren during his time as a probationer in the force. Chief Inspector Borkmann alone considered the time aspect of investigation and maintained that there came a point where no more information was needed. On reaching that point the superior detective knows enough to solve the case which depends on "some decent thinking". Borkmann's point also marked the difference between a good investigator and a bad one. The good detective tries to establish when that point is reached, or passed; a bad one, lacking this ability, carries on unnecessarily.

== Awards ==
The novel won the Swedish Crime Writers' Academy Prize for Best Crime Novel in 2004, and on English publication it was shortlisted for the Duncan Lawrie International Dagger.

== Film ==
An eponymous film was made in 2005, directed by Erik Leijonborg.
