= Lisa Wede =

Swedish journalist

Inga-Lisa Wede (born 27 September 1951 in Övertorneå Municipality, Sweden) is a Swedish journalist, working for Sveriges Radio. From 2003 until his death in 2020 she was married to the actor Sven Wollter.
