= Guldbagge Award for Best Director =

Swedish film award

- Country: Sweden
- Presented by: Swedish Film Institute
- First award: 1964 (for direction in films released during the 1963/1964 film season)
- Winner(s): Levan Akin, Crossing (2024)
- Website: guldbaggen.se

The Guldbagge for Best Director is a Swedish film award presented annually by the Swedish Film Institute (SFI) as part of the Guldbagge Awards (Swedish: "Guldbaggen") to directors working in the Swedish motion picture industry.

== History ==
Throughout the past 50 years, SFI has presented a total of 50 Best Director awards to 40 different directors. Along with the categories Best Film, Best Actor in a Leading Role and Best Actress in a Leading Role, the award for Best director were one of the four original price categories which was presented at the first award ceremony in 1964. At the 1st Guldbagge Awards (1963/1964), Ingmar Bergman was awarded the first Guldbagge for his film The Silence. Since then, the prize has been awarded every year, except in 1971 where the only prize for best film was awarded, and in 1980 where only the categories Best Film, Best Actor along with the Ingmar Bergman Award. At both the 30th Guldbagge Awards (1994) and the 42nd Guldbagge Awards (2006), Best Director was presented to a co-directing team, rather than to an individual director.

The Guldbagge Awards for Best Director and Best Film have been very closely linked throughout their history. Of the 55 films that have been awarded Best Film, 24 have also been awarded Best Director. The first one to achieve this was Ingmar Bergman, whose film The Silence won the Best Film award at the first 1st Guldbagge Awards. The last one who achieved this was Magnus von Horn through his film, The Here After at the 51st Guldbagge Awards (2015).

The first woman who won the award for Best Director was Marianne Ahrne, for the film Near and Far Away (1976). Besides her, only nine women have ever been awarded for Best Director: Suzanne Osten for The Mozart Brothers (1986), Åsa Faringer for The Daughter of the Puma (1994), Ella Lemhagen for Tsatsiki, morsan och polisen (1999), Catti Edfeldt and Ylva Gustavsson for Kidz in da Hood (2006), Lisa Siwe for Glowing Stars (2009), Pernilla August for Beyond (2010), and Gabriela Pichler for Eat Sleep Die (2012). Since 1991, when the nomination system was introduced with three nominees, the number of female directors has increased significantly, with a total of 22 women. The first woman that got nominated was Susanne Bier for the film Freud Leaving Home (1991).

== Winners and nominees ==
Each Guldbagge Awards ceremony is listed chronologically below along with the winner of the Guldbagge Award for Directing and the film associated with the award. Before 1991 the awards did not announce nominees, only winners. In the columns under the winner of each award are the other nominees for best director, which are listed from 1991 and forward.

For the first nineteen ceremonies, the eligibility period spanned two calendar years. For example, the 2nd Guldbagge Awards presented on October 15, 1965, recognized films that were released between July, 1964 and June, 1965. Starting with the 20th Guldbagge Awards, held in 1985, the period of eligibility became the full previous calendar year from January 1 to December 31. The Awards presented at that ceremony were in respect of 18 months of film production owing to the changeover from the broken calendar year to the standard calendar year during 1984. Due to a mediocre film year, no awards ceremony was held in 1971.

Winners before the nomination system (1964–1990)
Winners under the nomination system (1991–present)

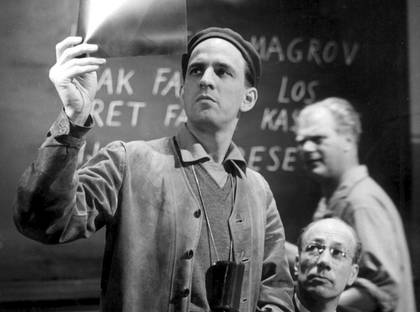
Ingmar Bergman won two awards, the first for The Silence, and the second for Fanny and Alexander.

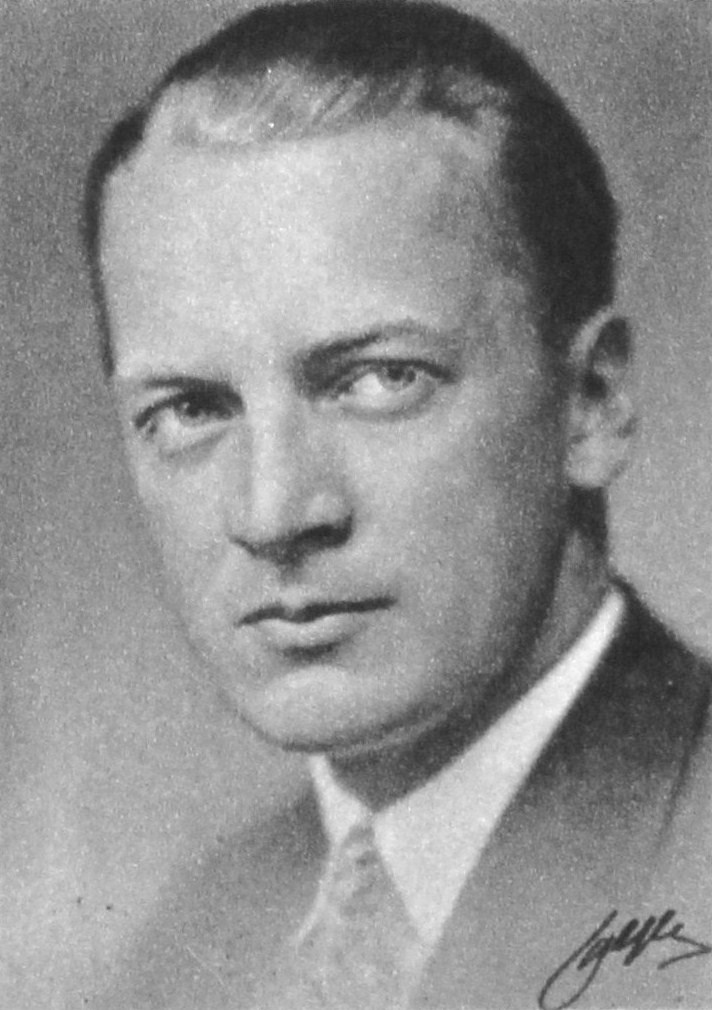
Alf Sjöberg won in 1965/66 for directing Ön.

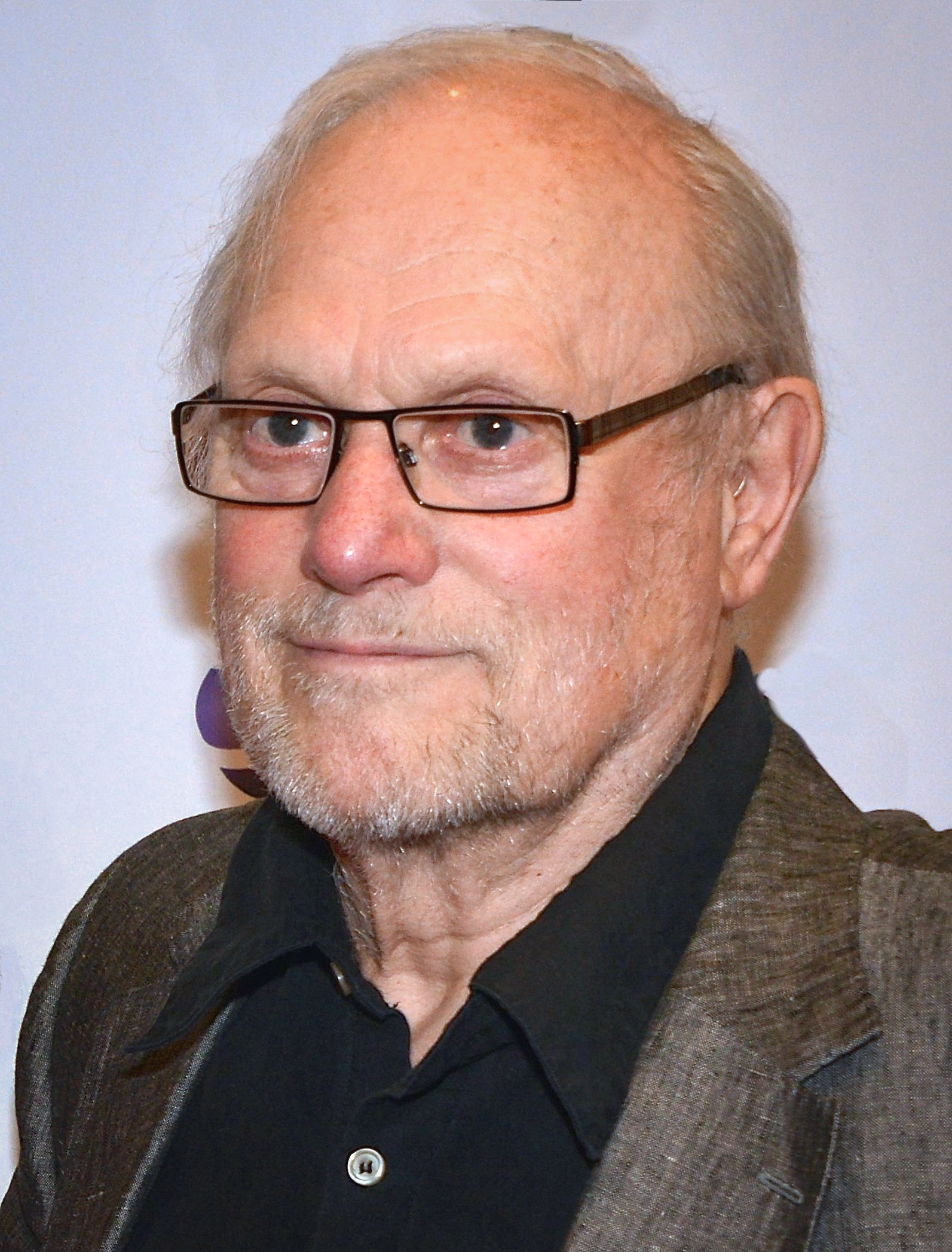
Jan Troell won two awards in this category, for Here's Your Life and As White as in Snow, and was nominated for two: Everlasting Moments and The Last Sentence.

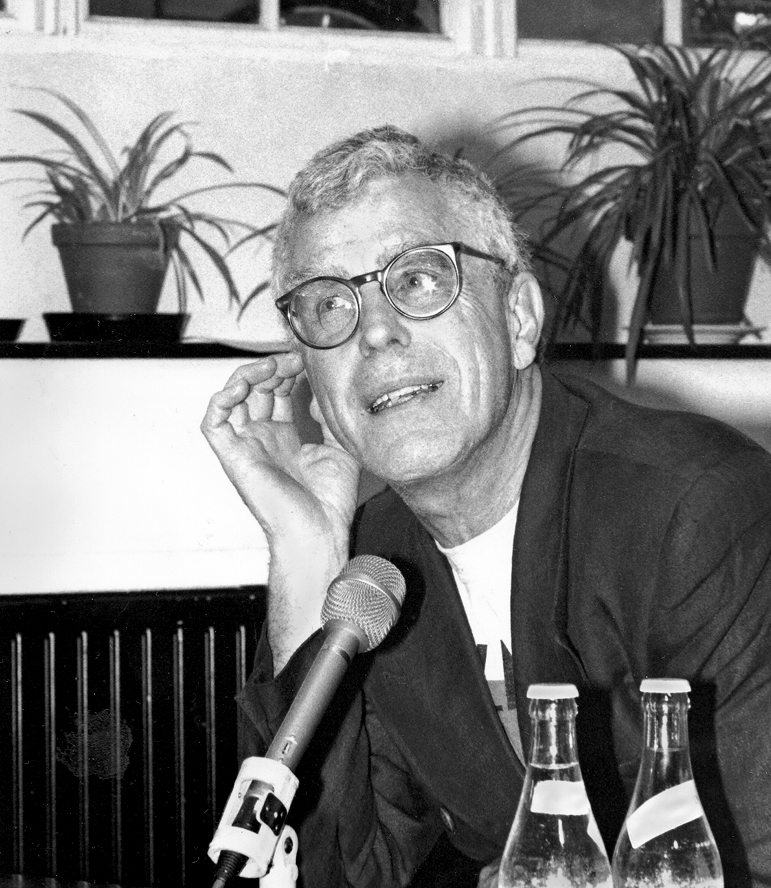
Bo Widerberg won two awards in this category, Ådalen 31, and All Things Fair.

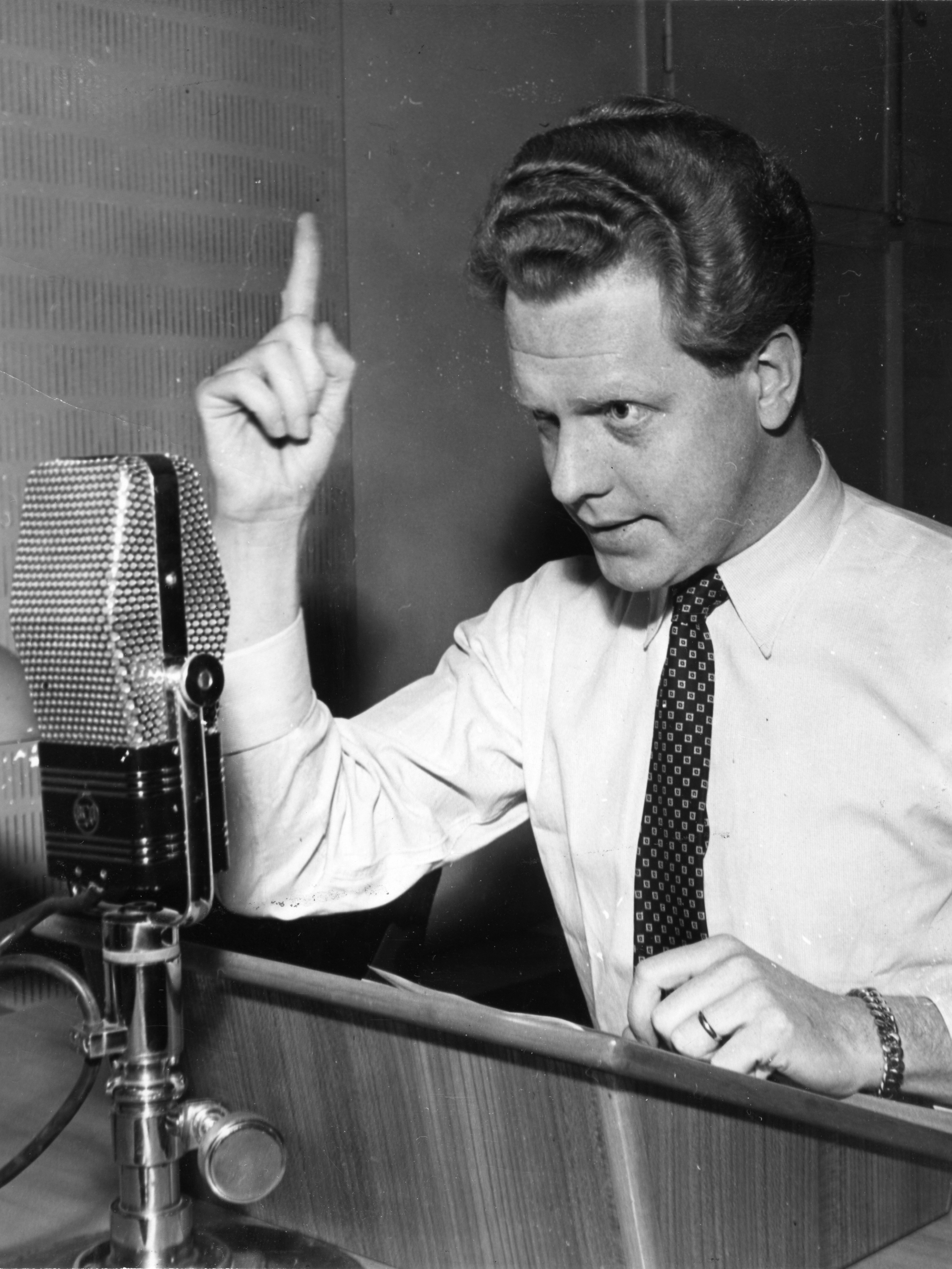
Tage Danielsson won in 1971/72 for directing The Apple War.

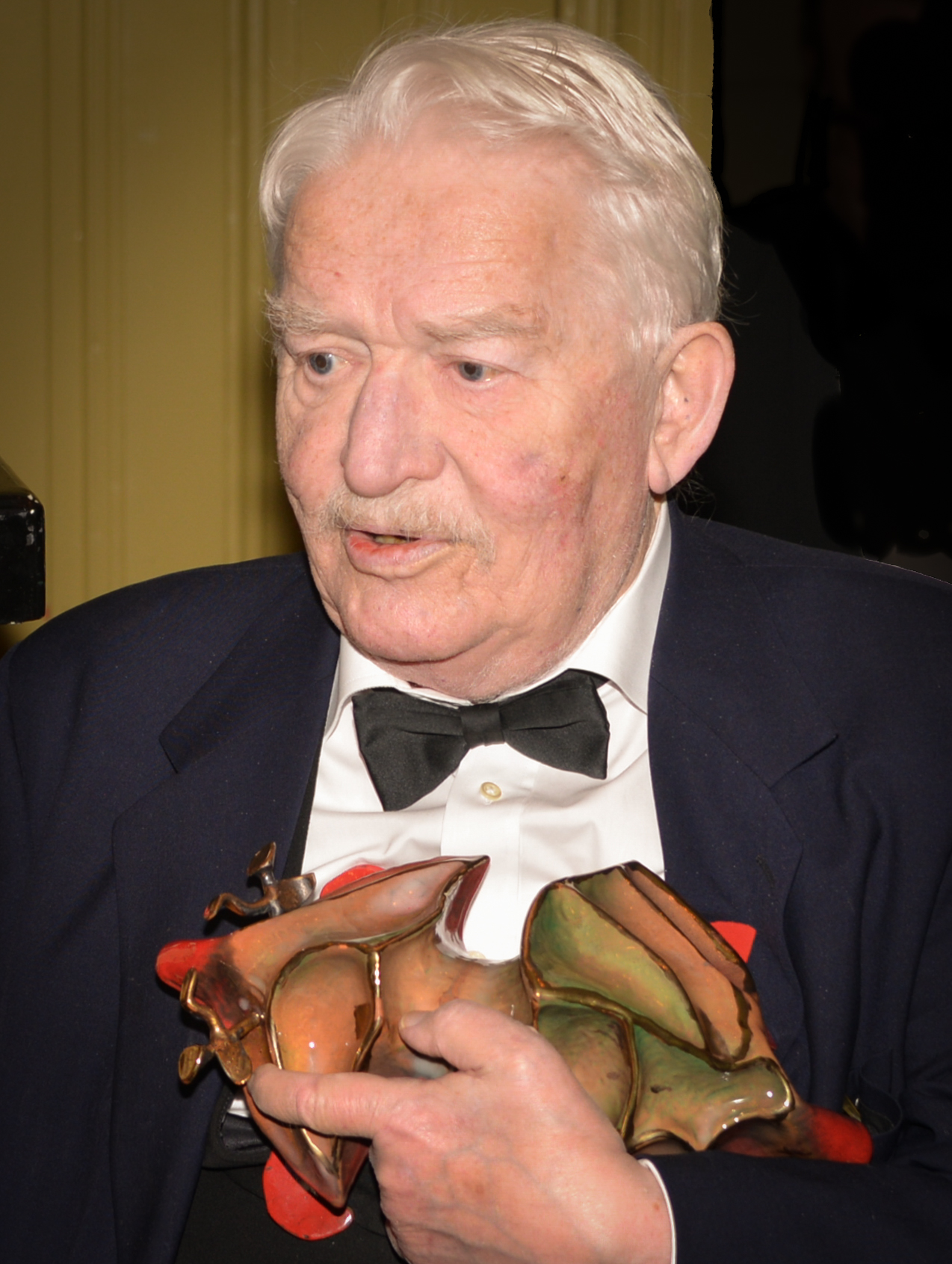
Hans Alfredsson won three awards in this category, Egg! Egg! A Hardboiled Story, The Simple-Minded Murderer, and False as Water.

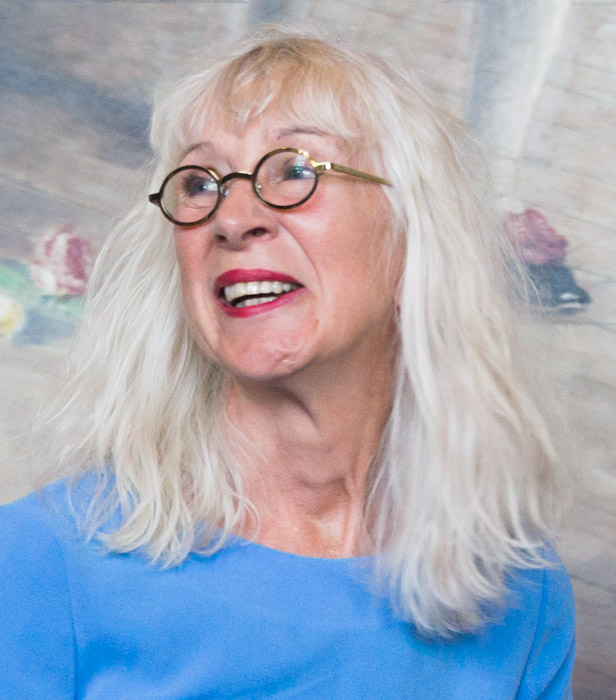
Suzanne Osten won in 1986 for directing The Mozart Brothers.

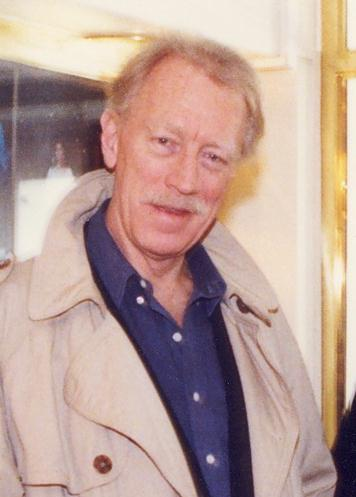
Max von Sydow won in 1988 for directing Katinka.

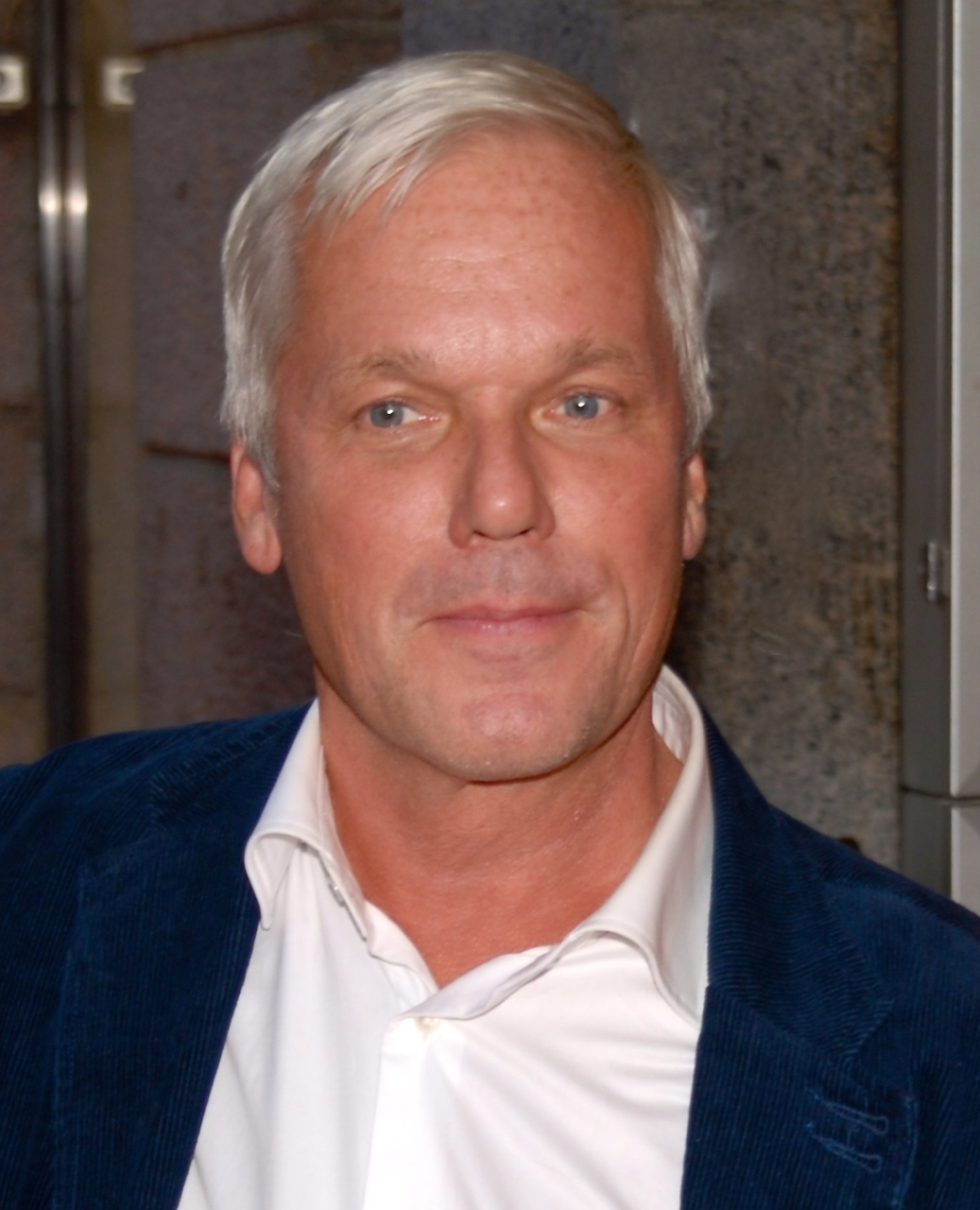
Kjell Sundvall won in 1996 for directing The Hunters.

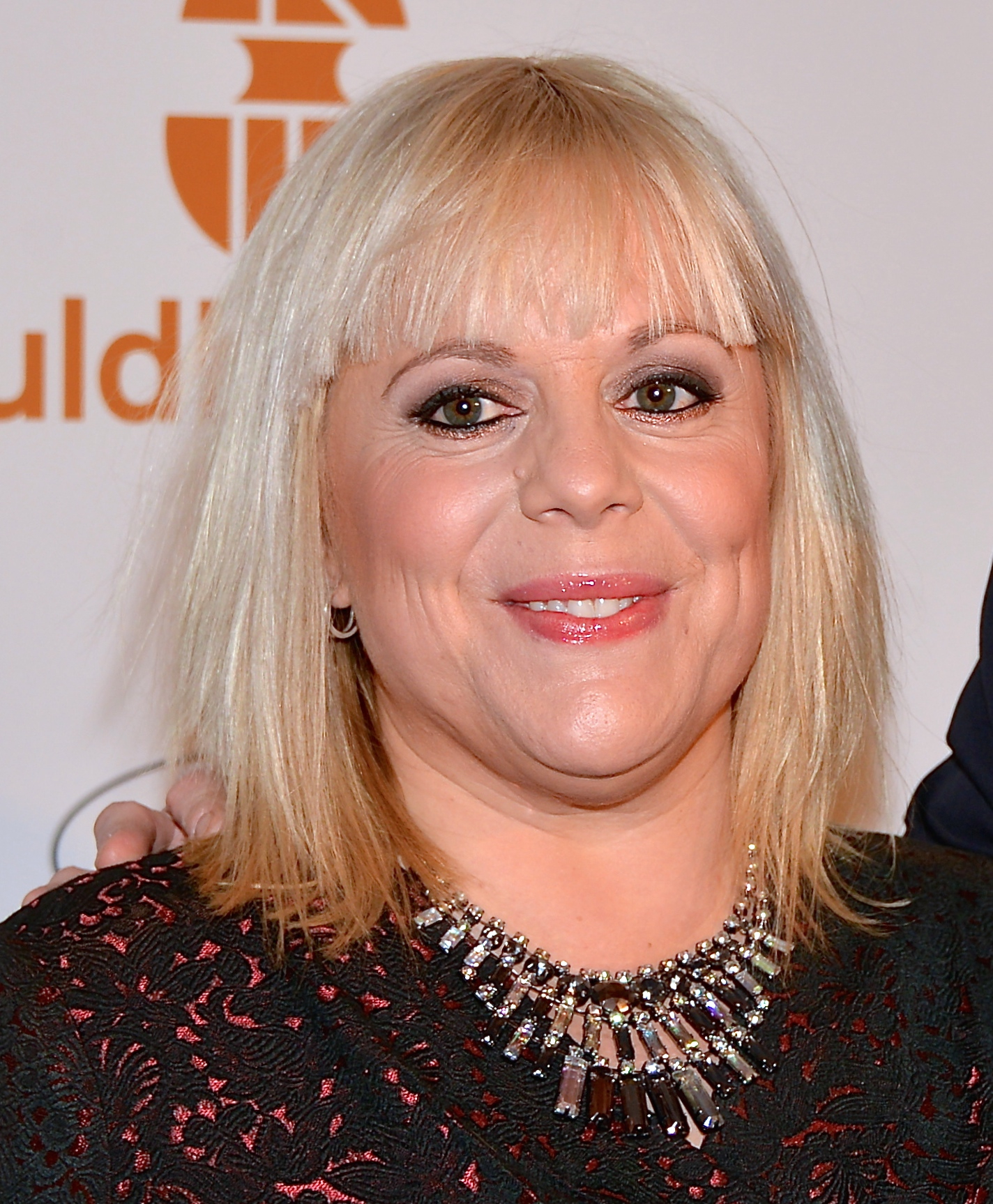
Ella Lemhagen won in 1999 for directing Tsatsiki, morsan och polisen.

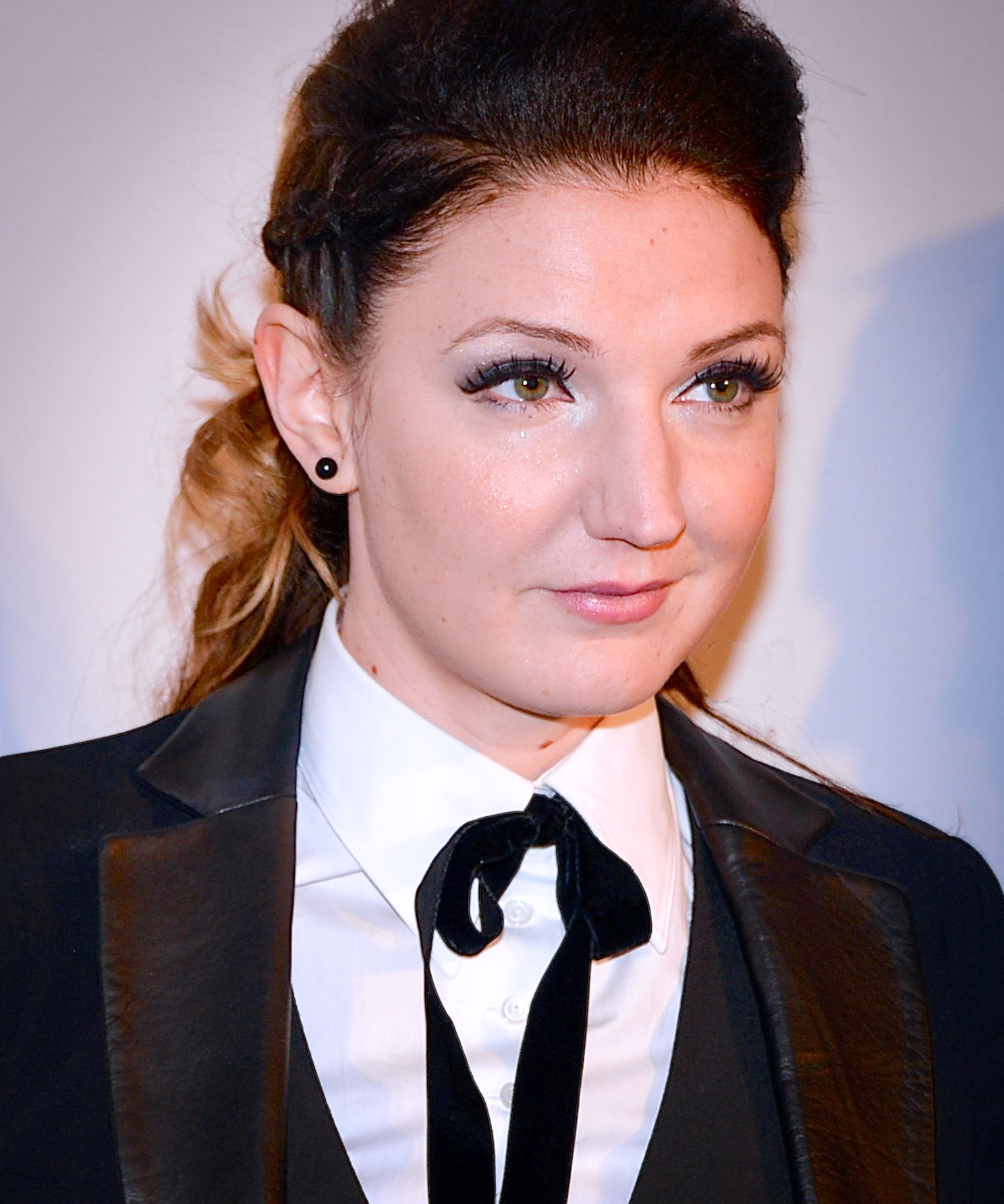
Gabriela Pichler won in 2012 for directing Eat Sleep Die.

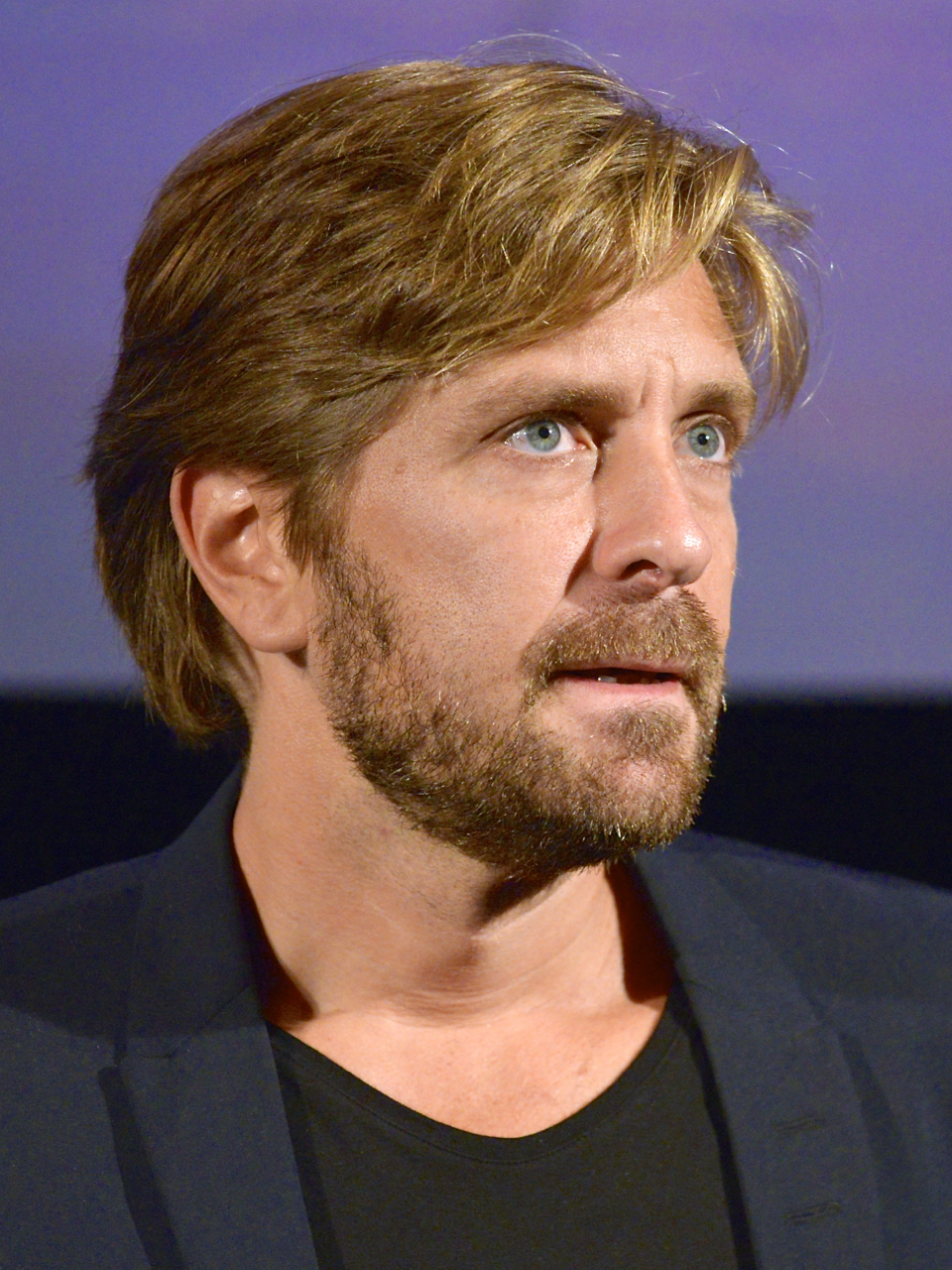
Ruben Östlund won three awards in this category, Play, Force Majeure, and The Square.

Year	Director(s)	Film	Ref.
1963/64 (1st)	Ingmar Bergman‡	The Silence	
1964/65 (2nd)	Arne Sucksdorff‡	My Home Is Copacabana	
1965/66 (3rd)	Alf Sjöberg‡	Ön	
1966/67 (4th)	Jan Troell‡	Here's Your Life	
1967/68 (5th)	Kjell Grede‡	Hugo and Josephine	
1968/69 (6th)	Bo Widerberg‡	Ådalen 31	
1969/70 (7th)	Lars Lennart Forsberg‡	Mistreatment	
1970/71	— (no award given)	— (no award given)	
1971/72 (8th)	Tage Danielsson‡	The Apple War	
1972/73 (9th)	Johan Bergenstråhle‡	Foreigners	
1973/74 (10th)	Vilgot Sjöman‡	A Handful of Love	
1974/75 (11th)	Hans Alfredson‡	Egg! Egg! A Hardboiled Story	
1975/76 (12th)	Jan Halldoff‡	Polare	
1976/77 (13th)	Marianne Ahrne‡	Near and Far Away	
1977/78 (14th)	Olle Hellbom‡	The Brothers Lionheart	
1978/79 (15th)	Stefan Jarl‡	A Respectable Life	
1979/80 (16th)	— (no award given)	— (no award given)	
1980/81 (17th)	Kay Pollak‡	Children's Island	
1981/82 (18th)	Hans Alfredson‡	The Simple-Minded Murderer	
1982/83 (19th)	Ingmar Bergman‡	Fanny and Alexander	
1984 (20th)	Hrafn Gunnlaugsson‡	When the Raven Flies	
1985 (21st)	Hans Alfredson	False as Water	
1986 (22nd)	Suzanne Osten‡	The Mozart Brothers	
1987 (23rd)	Kjell Grede‡	Hip hip hurra!	
1988 (24th)	Max von Sydow‡	Katinka	
1989 (25th)	Åke Sandgren‡	The Miracle in Valby	
1990 (26th)	Kjell Grede‡	Good Evening, Mr. Wallenberg	
1991 (27th)	Anders Grönros‡	Agnes Cecilia – en sällsam historia	
1991 (27th)	Susanne Bier	Freud Leaving Home	
1991 (27th)	Clas Lindberg	Underground Secrets	
1992 (28th)	Colin Nutley‡	House of Angels	
1992 (28th)	Kjell-Åke Andersson	Night of the Orangutan	
1992 (28th)	Bille August	The Best Intentions	
1993 (29th)	Clas Lindberg‡	The Ferris Wheel	
1993 (29th)	Daniel Alfredson	The Man on the Balcony	
1993 (29th)	Åke Sandgren	The Slingshot	
1994 (30th)	Ulf Hultberg‡ Åsa Faringer‡	The Daughter of the Puma	
1994 (30th)	Catti Edfeldt	Sixten	
1994 (30th)	Rainer Hartleb	A Pizza in Jordbro	
1995 (31st)	Bo Widerberg‡	All Things Fair	
1995 (31st)	Kristian Petri	Between Summers	
1995 (31st)	Tomas Alfredson	Bert: The Last Virgin	
1996 (32nd)	Kjell Sundvall‡	The Hunters	
1996 (32nd)	Kjell-Åke Andersson	Christmas Oratorio	
1996 (32nd)	Ella Lemhagen	The Dream Prince	
1997 (33rd)	Daniel Alfredson‡	Tic Tac	
1997 (33rd)	Måns Herngren; Hannes Holm	Adam & Eva	
1997 (33rd)	Christina Olofson	Sanning eller konsekvens	
1998 (34th)	Lukas Moodysson‡	Show Me Love	
1998 (34th)	Solveig Nordlund	Nelio's Story	
1998 (34th)	Lisa Ohlin	Waiting for the Tenor	
1999 (35th)	Ella Lemhagen‡	Tsatsiki, morsan och polisen	
1999 (35th)	Anders Nilsson	Zero Tolerance	
1999 (35th)	Kjell Sundvall	In Bed with Santa	
2000 (36th)	Roy Andersson‡	Songs from the Second Floor	
2000 (36th)	Geir Hansteen Jörgensen	The New Country	
2000 (36th)	Lukas Moodysson	Together	
2001 (37th)	Jan Troell‡	As White as in Snow	
2001 (37th)	Mikael Håfström	Days Like This	
2001 (37th)	Bille August	A Song for Martin	
2002 (38th)	Lukas Moodysson‡	Lilya 4-ever	
2002 (38th)	Ulf Malmros	We Can Be Heroes!	
2002 (38th)	Kjell Sundvall	Grabben i graven bredvid	
2003 (39th)	Björn Runge‡	Daybreak	
2003 (39th)	Mikael Håfström	Evil	
2003 (39th)	Kristian Petri	Details	
2004 (40th)	Tomas Alfredson‡	Four Shades of Brown	
2004 (40th)	Maria Blom	Dalecarlians	
2004 (40th)	Kay Pollak	As It Is in Heaven	
2005 (41st)	Ulf Malmros‡	Tjenare kungen	
2005 (41st)	Josef Fares	Zozo	
2005 (41st)	Björn Runge	Mouth to Mouth	
2006 (42nd)	Catti Edfeldt‡ Ylva Gustavsson‡	Kidz in da Hood	
2006 (42nd)	Jesper Ganslandt	Falkenberg Farewell	
2006 (42nd)	Anders Nilsson	When Darkness Falls	
2007 (43rd)	Roy Andersson‡	You, the Living	
2007 (43rd)	Josef Fares	Leo	
2007 (43rd)	Johan Kling	Darling	
2008 (44th)	Tomas Alfredson‡	Let the Right One In	
2008 (44th)	Jan Troell	Everlasting Moments	
2008 (44th)	Ruben Östlund	Involuntary	
2009 (45th)	Lisa Siwe‡	Glowing Stars	
2009 (45th)	Teresa Fabik	Starring Maja	
2009 (45th)	Fredrik Edfeldt	The Girl	
2010 (46th)	Pernilla August‡	Beyond	
2010 (46th)	Lisa Langseth	Pure	
2010 (46th)	Babak Najafi	Sebbe	
2011 (47th)	Ruben Östlund‡	Play	
2011 (47th)	Lisa Aschan	She Monkeys	
2011 (47th)	Lisa Ohlin	Simon and the Oaks	
2012 (48th)	Gabriela Pichler‡	Eat Sleep Die	
2012 (48th)	Mikael Marcimain	Call Girl	
2012 (48th)	Jan Troell	The Last Sentence	
2013 (49th)	Per Fly‡	Waltz for Monica	
2013 (49th)	Anna Odell	The Reunion	
2013 (49th)	Måns Mårlind; Björn Stein	Shed No Tears	
2014 (50th)	Ruben Östlund‡	Force Majeure	
2014 (50th)	Mikael Marcimain	Gentlemen	
2014 (50th)	Roy Andersson	A Pigeon Sat on a Branch Reflecting on Existence	
2015 (51st)	Magnus von Horn‡	The Here After	
2015 (51st)	Sanna Lenken	My Skinny Sister	
2015 (51st)	Peter Grönlund	Drifters	
2016 (52nd)	Goran Kapetanović‡	My Aunt in Sarajevo	
2016 (52nd)	Felix Herngren; Måns Herngren	The 101-Year Old Man Who Skipped Out on the Bill and Disappeared	
2016 (52nd)	Hanna Sköld	Granny´s Dancing on the Table	
2016 (52nd)	Alexandra-Therese Keining	Girls Lost	
2017 (53rd)	Ruben Östlund‡	The Square	
2017 (53rd)	Amanda Kernell	Sami Blood	
2017 (53rd)	Janus Metz Pedersen	Borg McEnroe	
2017 (53rd)	Tarik Saleh	The Nile Hilton Incident	
2018 (54th)	Carl Javér	Reconstructing Utøya	
2018 (54th)	Ali Abbasi	Border	
2018 (54th)	Måns Månsson and Axel Petersén	The Real Estate	
2018 (54th)	Gabriela Pichler	Amateurs	
2019 (55th)	Hugo Lilja and Pella Kågerman ‡	Aniara	
2019 (55th)	Levan Akin	And Then We Danced	
2019 (55th)	Roy Andersson	About Endlessness	
2019 (55th)	Jon Holmberg	Sune – Best Man	
2020 (56th)	Amanda Kernell ‡	Charter	
2020 (56th)	Nathan Grossman	Greta	
2020 (56th)	Maria Bäck	Psychosis in Stockholm	
2020 (56th)	Henrik Schyffert	Spring Uje spring	
2021 (57th)	Nathalie Álvarez Mesén ‡	Clara Sola	
2021 (57th)	Gorki Glaser-Müller	Children of the Enemy	
2021 (57th)	Ninja Thyberg	Pleasure	
2021 (57th)	Ronnie Sandahl	Tigers	

== International presence ==
As the Guldbagge Awards are based in Sweden and are centered on the Swedish film industry, the majority of Guldbagge Award winners have been Swedish. Nonetheless, there is significant international presence at the awards, as evidenced by the following list of winners of the Guldbagge Award for Best Director.

- Denmark: Per Fly
- Iceland: Hrafn Gunnlaugsson
- United Kingdom: Colin Nutley

However, no director has won for a film that is entirely in a foreign language.

Several international nominees include:

- Denmark: Susanne Bier and Bille August (nominated for 2 films)
- Germany: Rainer Hartleb

== See also ==
- Academy Award for Best Director
- BAFTA Award for Best Direction
- Golden Globe Award for Best Director
- Directors Guild of America Award for Outstanding Directing – Feature Film
