= Guldbagge Award for Best Actor in a Leading Role =

Swedish film award

- Country: Sweden
- Presented by: Swedish Film Institute
- First award: 1964 (for acting in films released during the 1963/1964 film season)
- Currently held by: Herbert Nordrum , The Hypnosis (2024)
- Website: guldbaggen.se

The Guldbagge for Best Actor in a Leading Role is a Swedish film award presented annually by the Swedish Film Institute (SFI) as part of the Guldbagge Awards (Swedish: "Guldbaggen") to actors working in the Swedish motion picture industry.

== Superlatives ==
Superlative	Best Actor		Best Supporting Actor		Overall	
Actor with most awards	Jarl Kulle; Göran Stangertz; Stellan Skarsgård; Sven Wollter; Max von Sydow; Rolf Lassgård; Sven-Bertil Taube; Krister Henriksson; Mikael Persbrandt	2	—	—	Jarl Kulle; Göran Stangertz; Stellan Skarsgård; Sven Wollter; Max von Sydow; Rolf Lassgård; Sven-Bertil Taube; Krister Henriksson; Mikael Persbrandt	2
Actor with most nominations	Mikael Persbrandt; Rolf Lassgård	5	Anders Ahlbom; Thommy Berggren; Kjell Bergqvist; Brasse Brännström; David Dencik; Dan Ekborg; Sverrir Gudnason; Michael Nyqvist; Shanti Roney; Sven-Bertil Taube; Johan Widerberg	2	Mikael Persbrandt; Rolf Lassgård	5

== Winners and nominees ==
Each Guldbagge Awards ceremony is listed chronologically below along with the winner of the Guldbagge Award for Actor in a Leading Role and the film associated with the award. Before 1991 the awards did not announce nominees, only winners. In the columns under the winner of each award are the other nominees for best actor, which are listed from 1991 and forward.

For the first nineteen ceremonies, the eligibility period spanned two calendar years. For example, the 2nd Guldbagge Awards presented on 15 October 1965, recognized films that were released between July 1964 and June 1965. Starting with the 20th Guldbagge Awards, held in 1985, the period of eligibility became the full previous calendar year from 1 January to 31 December. The Awards presented at that ceremony were in respect of 18 months of film production owing to the changeover from the broken calendar year to the standard calendar year during 1984. Due to a mediocre film year, no awards ceremony was held in 1971.

Winners before the nomination system (1964–1990)
Winners under the nomination system (1991–present)

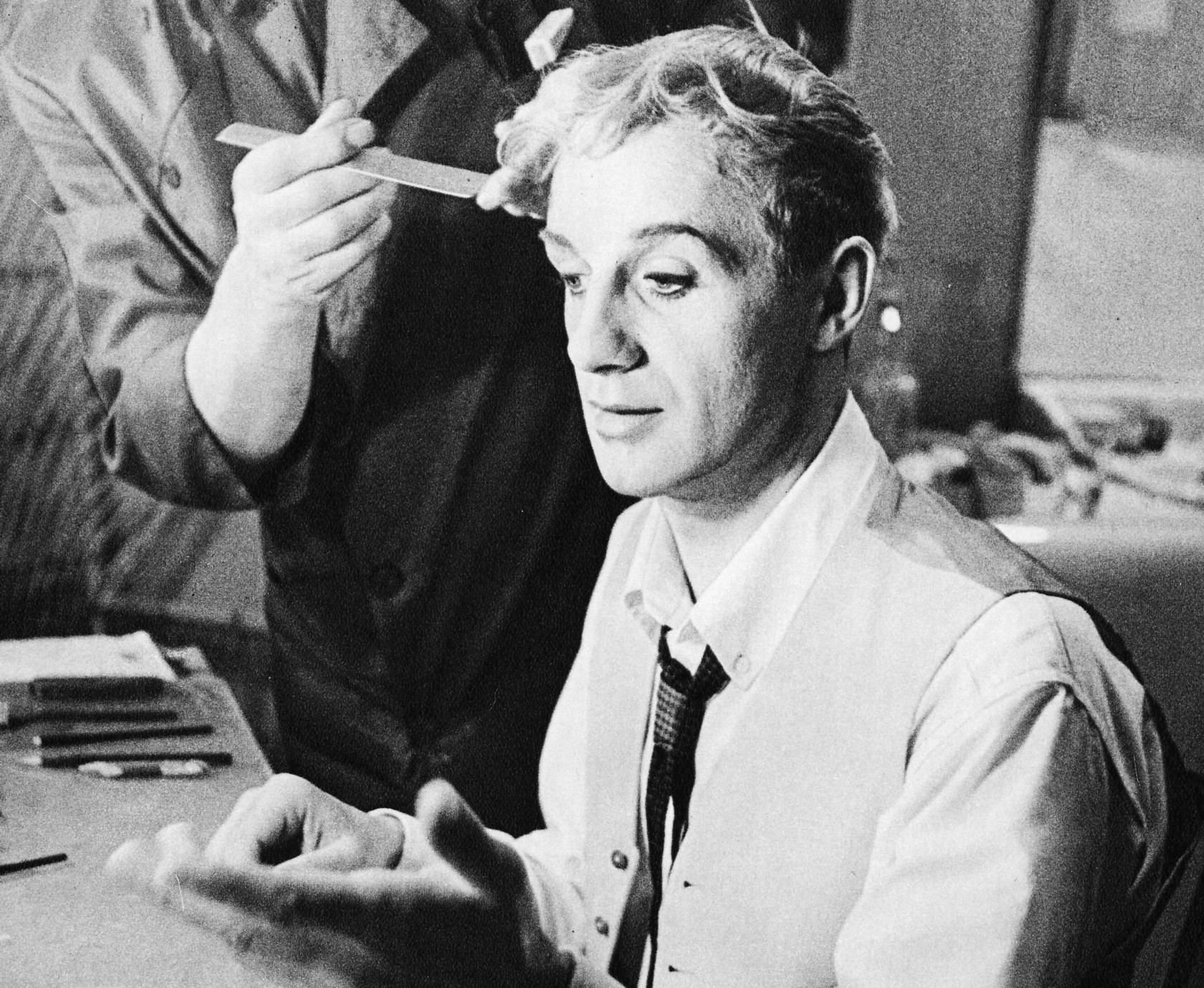
Jarl Kulle won twice for his roles in 1964's Swedish Wedding Night and 1983's Fanny and Alexander.

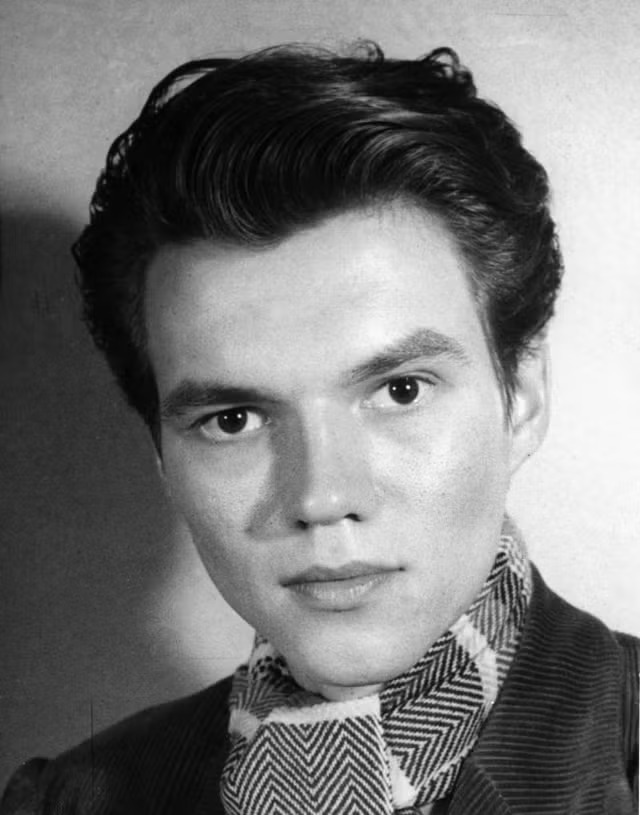
Per Oscarsson won in 1966/67 for his performance in Hunger.

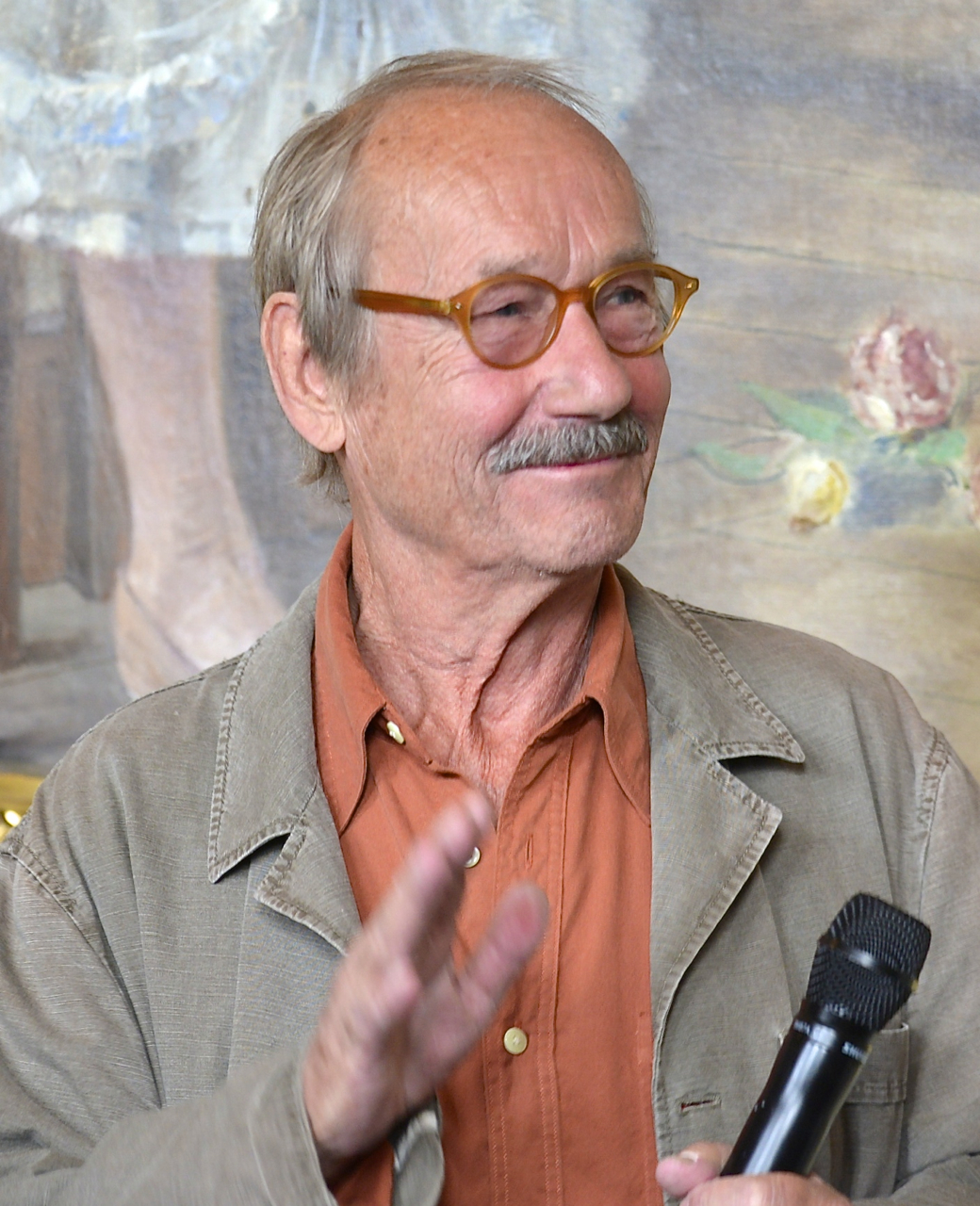
Gösta Ekman won in 1972/73 for his performance in The Man Who Quit Smoking.

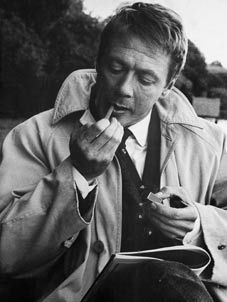
Allan Edwall won in 1973/74 for his performance in Emil and the Piglet.

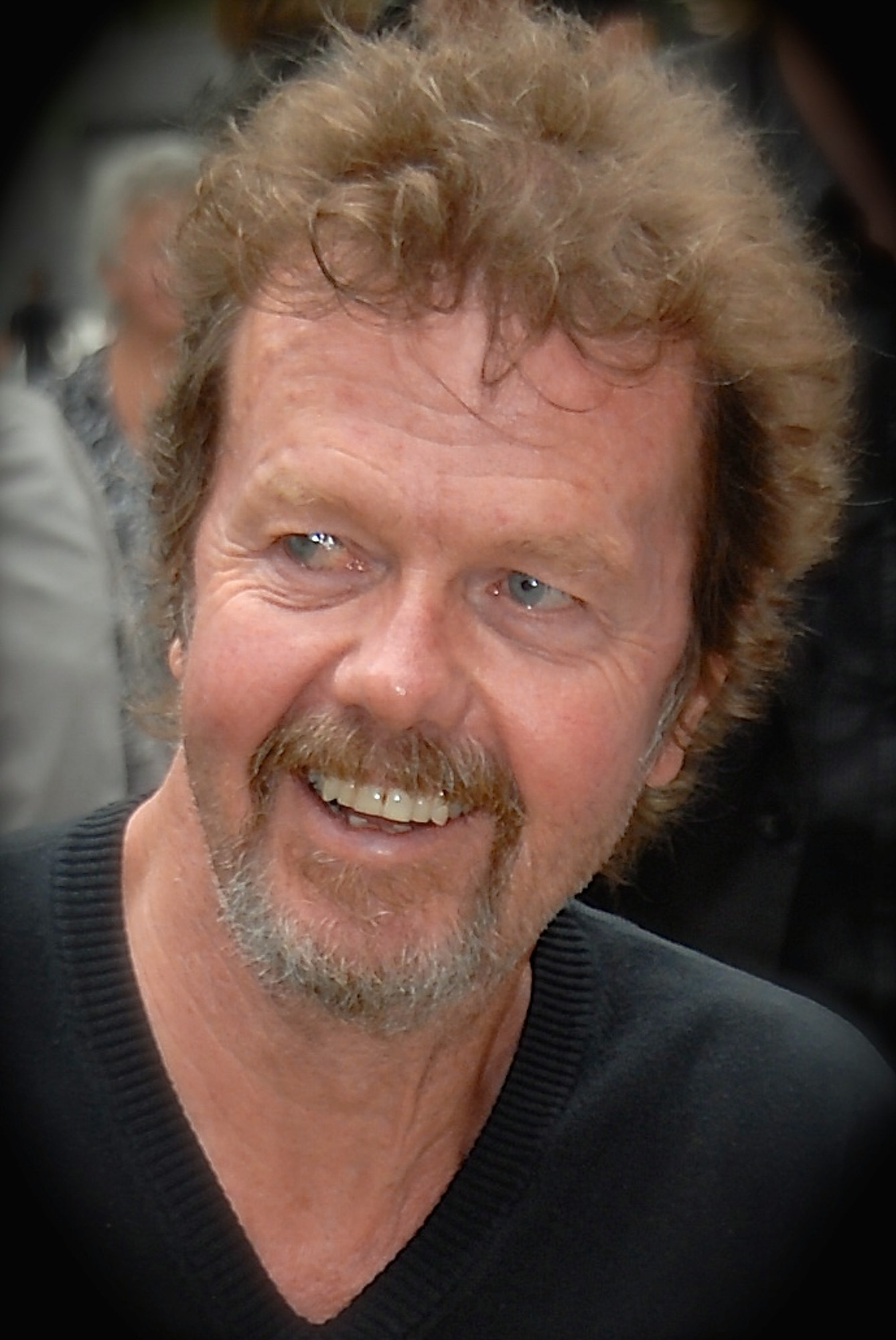
Göran Stangertz won twice for his roles in 1974/75's The Last Adventure and in 1997's Run for Your Life.

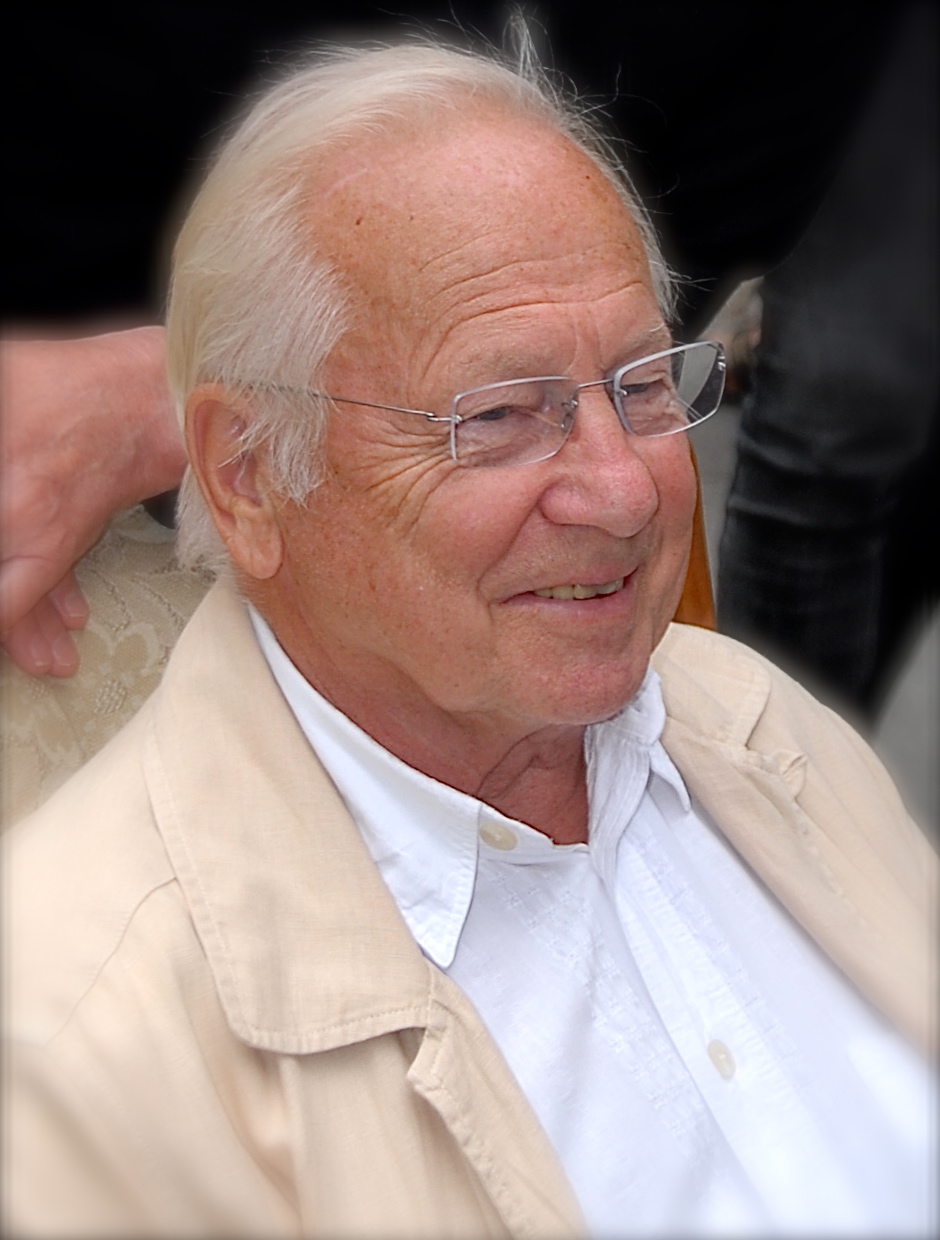
Ingvar Hirdwall won in 1980/81 for his performance in Children's Island.

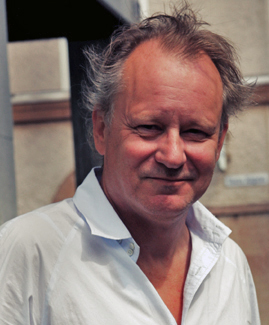
Stellan Skarsgård won twice for his roles in 1981/82's The Simple-Minded Murderer, and for 1989's films Codename Coq Rouge and The Women on the Roof.

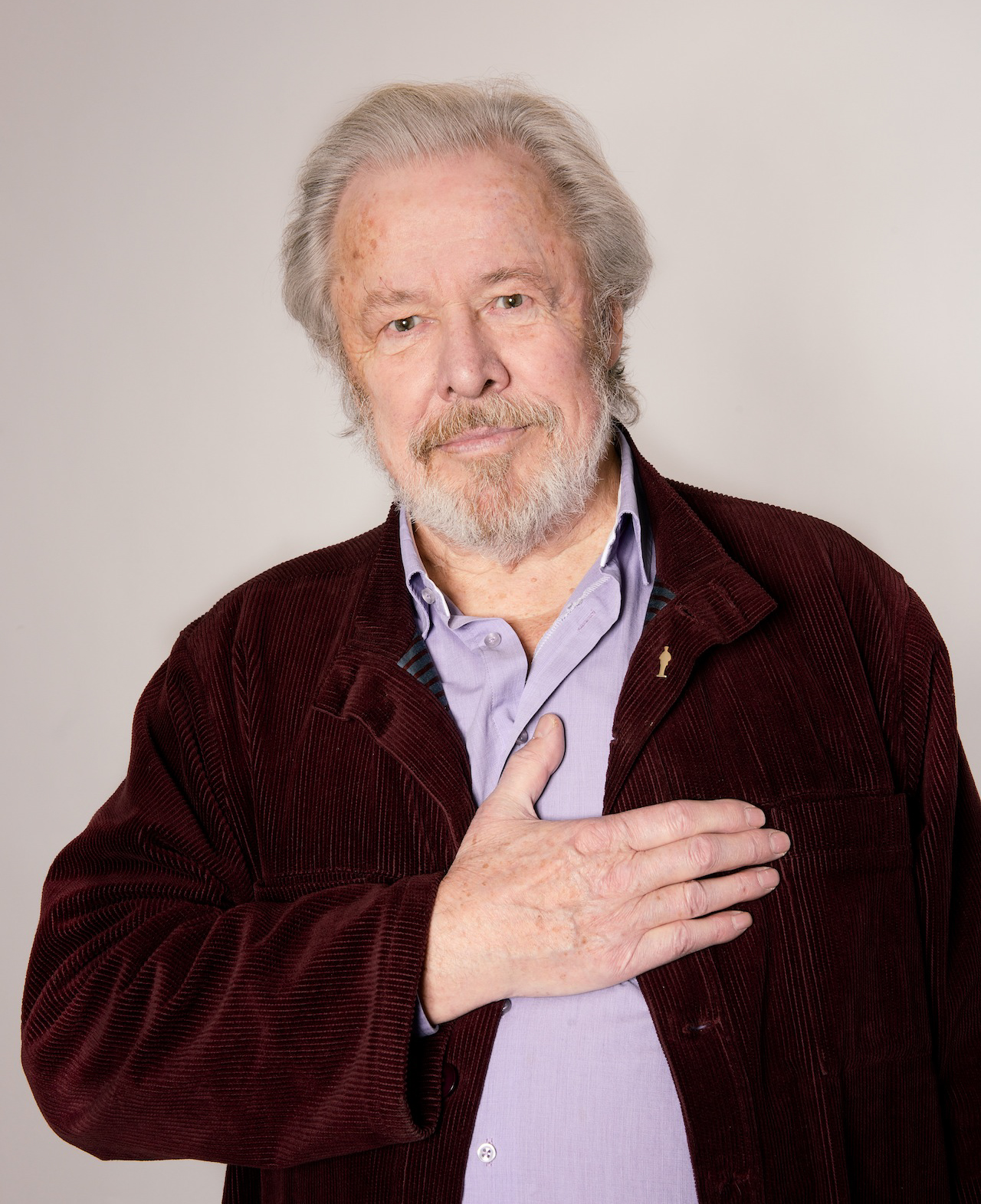
Sven Wollter won twice for his roles in 1984's films The Man from Majorca and Sista leken, and in 2001's A Song for Martin.

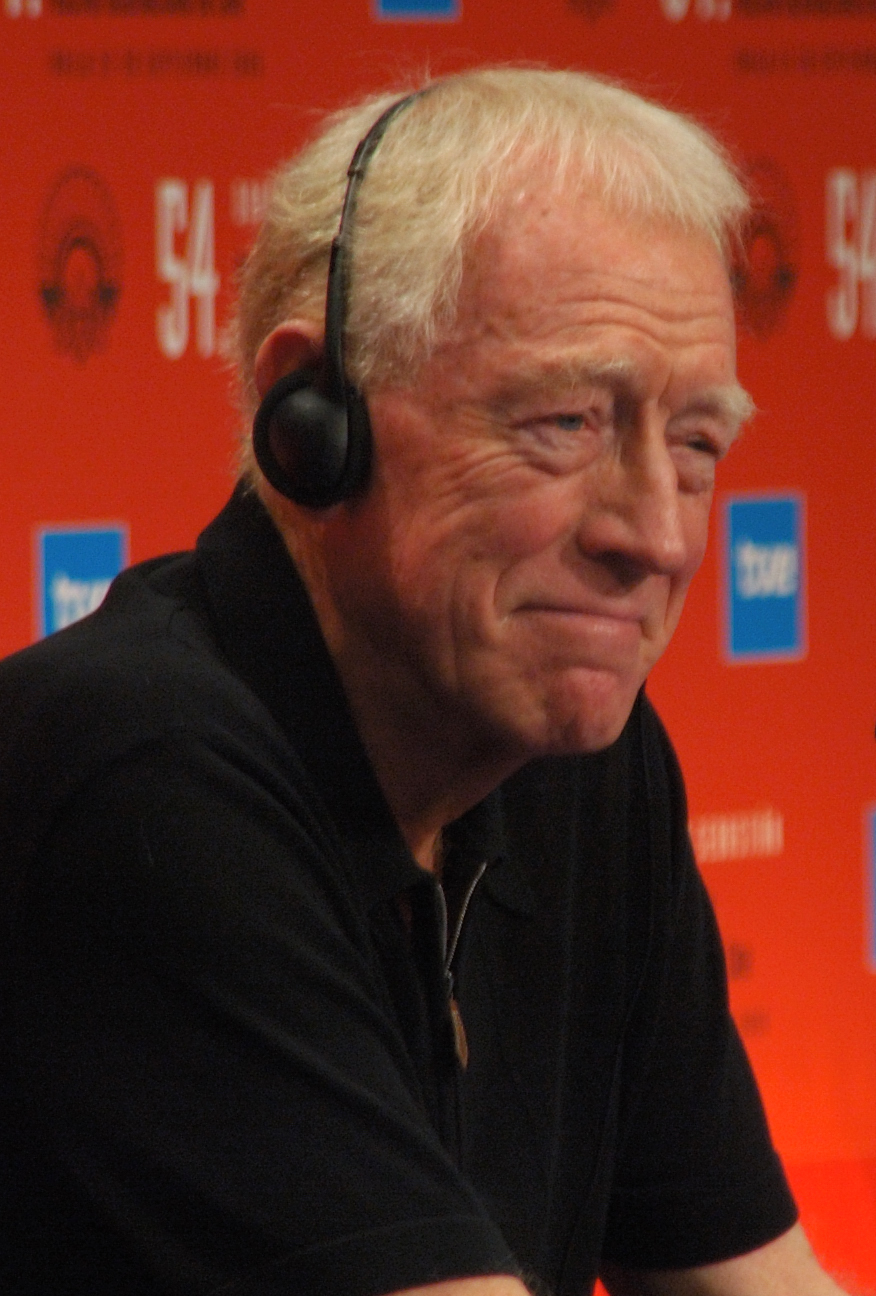
Max von Sydow won twice for his roles in 1987's Pelle the Conqueror and in 1996's Hamsun.

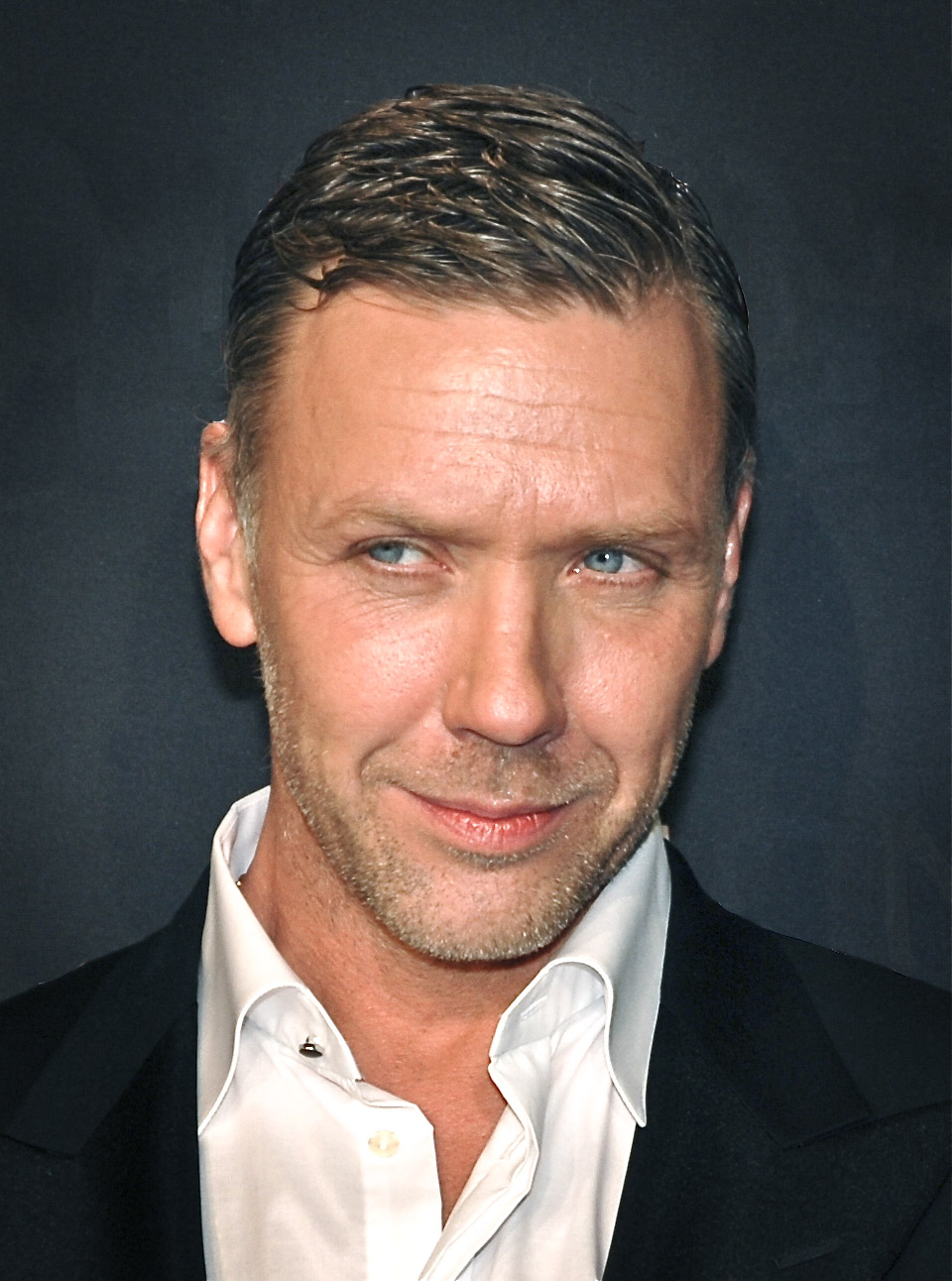
Mikael Persbrandt won twice for his roles in 2008's Everlasting Moments and 2013's Nobody Owns Me.

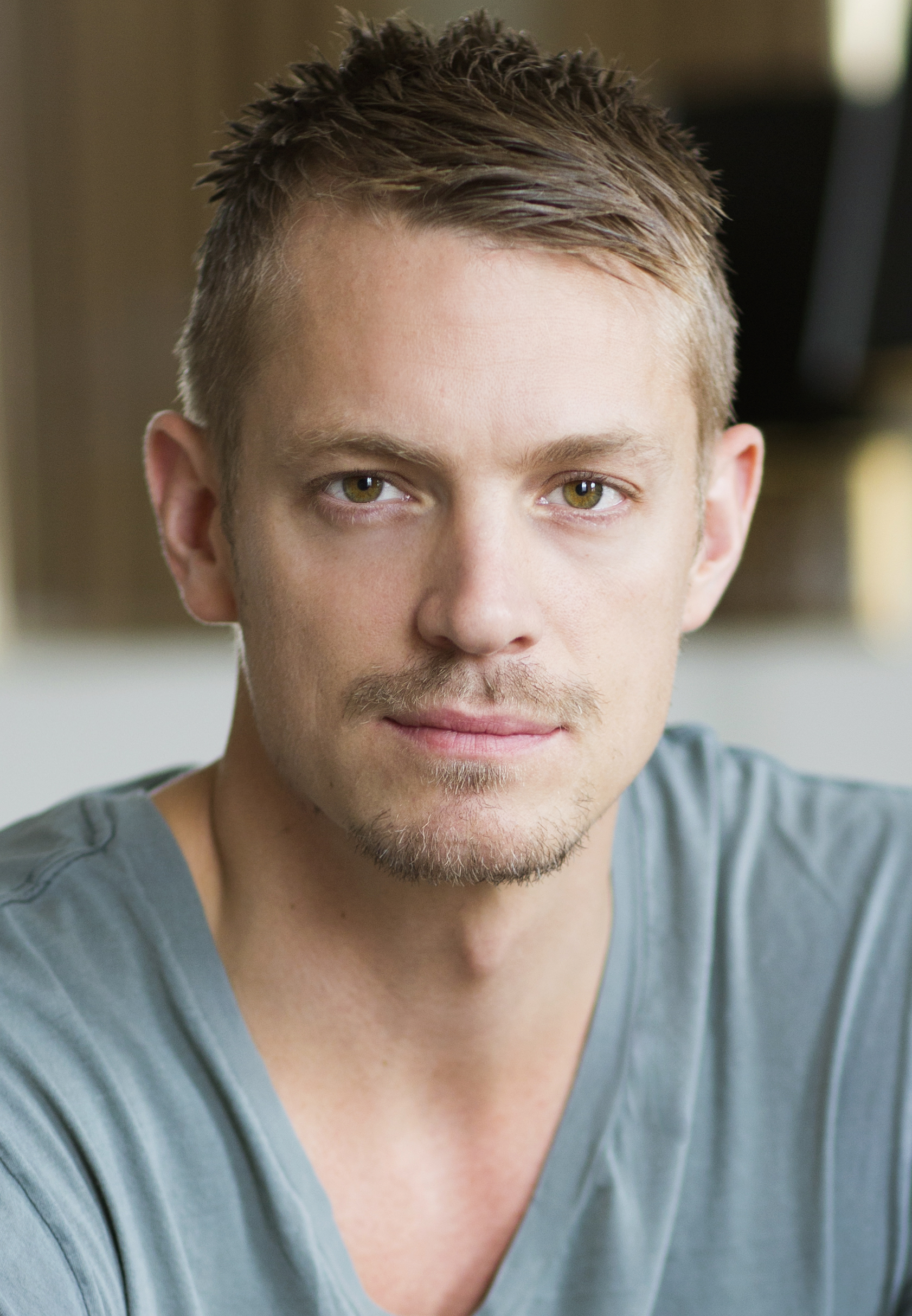
Joel Kinnaman won in 2010 for his performance in Easy Money.

Year	Actor	Film	Role(s)	Ref.
1963/64 (1st)	Keve Hjelm	Raven's End	The father	
1964/65 (2nd)	Jarl Kulle	Swedish Wedding Night	Hilmer Westlund	
1965/66 (3rd)	Thommy Berggren	Heja Roland!	Roland Jung	
1966/67 (4th)	Per Oscarsson	Hunger	Pontus	
1967/68 (5th)	Halvar Björk	Badarna	Knoppen Berglund	
1968/69 (6th)	Roland Hedlund	Ådalen 31	Harald	
1969/70 (7th)	Carl-Gustaf Lindstedt	Harry Munter	Valle	
1970/71	— (no award given)	— (no award given)	— (no award given)	
1971/72 (8th)	Eddie Axberg	The Emigrants; The New Land	Robert Nilsson	
1972/73 (9th)	Gösta Ekman	The Man Who Quit Smoking	Dante Alighieri	
1973/74 (10th)	Allan Edwall	Emil and the Piglet	Anton Svensson	
1974/75 (11th)	Göran Stangertz	The Last Adventure	Karl-Erik "Jimmy" Mattsson	
1975/76 (12th)	Toivo Pawlo	Hallo Baby	The girl's father	
1976/77 (13th)	Håkan Serner	The Man on the Roof; Bang!	Einar Rönn; Magnus Hinder	
1977/78 (14th)	Anders Lönnbro	The Score	Kennet Ahl	
1978/79 (15th)	Anders Åberg	Kejsaren	Elje (Jesaja) Ström	
1979/80 (16th)	Peter Lindgren	I Am Maria	Jon	
1980/81 (17th)	Ingvar Hirdwall	Children's Island	Stig Utler	
1981/82 (18th)	Stellan Skarsgård	The Simple-Minded Murderer	Sven	
1982/83 (19th)	Jarl Kulle	Fanny and Alexander	Gustav Adolf Ekdahl	
1984 (20th)	Sven Wollter	The Man from Majorca; Sista leken	Bo Jarnebring; Viktor	
1985 (21st)	Anton Glanzelius	My Life as a Dog	Ingemar	
1986 (22nd)	Erland Josephson	Amorosa; The Sacrifice	David Sprengel; Alexander	
1987 (23rd)	Max von Sydow	Pelle the Conqueror	Lasse Karlsson	
1988 (24th)	Tomas Bolme	Creditors	Adolf	
1989 (25th)	Stellan Skarsgård	Codename Coq Rouge; The Women on the Roof	Carl Hamilton; Willy	
1990 (26th)	Börje Ahlstedt	The Rabbit Man	Bengt Nääs	
1991 (27th)	Lasse Åberg	Den ofrivillige golfaren	Stig-Helmer Olsson	
1991 (27th)	Antti Reini	Il Capitano: A Swedish Requiem	Jari	
1991 (27th)	Rolf Lassgård	Önskas	Bosse	
1992 (28th)	Rolf Lassgård	Night of the Orangutan	Fritz Algot "Tjaffo" Nilsson	
1992 (28th)	Thommy Berggren	Sunday's Children	Erik Bergman	
1992 (28th)	Samuel Fröler	The Best Intentions	Henrik Bergman	
1993 (29th)	Sven Lindberg	Spring of Joy	Ragnar Persson	
1993 (29th)	Peter Haber	Sune's Summer	Rudolf	
1993 (29th)	Simon Norrthon	Speak Up! It's So Dark	Sören	
1994 (30th)	Sven-Bertil Taube	The Hands	Ralf	
1994 (30th)	Peter Haber	Sommarmord	Sture	
1994 (30th)	Tord Peterson	House of Angels – The Second Summer	Ivar Pettersson	
1995 (31st)	Loa Falkman	Like It Never Was Before	Rune Runeberg	
1995 (31st)	Peter Haber	White Lies	Palle Hagmann	
1995 (31st)	Johan Widerberg	All Things Fair	Stig Santesson	
1996 (32nd)	Max von Sydow	Hamsun	Knut Hamsun	
1996 (32nd)	Rolf Lassgård	The Hunters	Erik Bäckström	
1996 (32nd)	Gösta Ekman	Dad Is Tired Again	Father (Mr. Khopp)	
1997 (33rd)	Göran Stangertz	Run for Your Life	Mikael	
1997 (33rd)	Björn Kjellman	Adam & Eva	Adam	
1997 (33rd)	Jakob Eklund	Run for Your Life	Erik	
1998 (34th)	Krister Henriksson	Waiting for the Tenor	Hoffman/Henning	
1998 (34th)	Johan H:son Kjellgren	Waiting for the Tenor	Tomas	
1998 (34th)	Rolf Lassgård	Under the Sun	Olof	
1999 (35th)	Björn Kjellman	Vägen ut	Reine	
1999 (35th)	Mikael Persbrandt	Deathly Compulsion	Andreas Persson	
1999 (35th)	Jakob Eklund	Zero Tolerance	Johan Falk	
2000 (36th)	Kjell Bergqvist	Den bästa sommaren	Yngve Johansson	
2000 (36th)	Per Graffman	Before the Storm	Ali	
2000 (36th)	Michalis Koutsogiannakis	The New Land	Massoud	
2001 (37th)	Sven Wollter	A Song for Martin	Martin	
2001 (37th)	Örjan Ramberg	Powder	Ambel	
2001 (37th)	Kjell Bergqvist	Days Like This	Leif	
2002 (38th)	Michael Nyqvist	Grabben i graven bredvid	Benny Söderström	
2002 (38th)	Artyom Bogucharsky	Lilja 4-ever	Volodja	
2002 (38th)	Mikael Persbrandt	Everybody Loves Alice	Johan Lindberg	
2003 (39th)	Jonas Karlsson	Details	Stefan	
2003 (39th)	Jakob Eklund	Daybreak	Rickard	
2003 (39th)	Andreas Wilson	Evil	Erik Ponti	
2004 (40th)	Robert Gustafsson	Four Shades of Brown	Christer; Johan	
2004 (40th)	Michael Nyqvist	As It Is in Heaven	Daniel Daréus	
2004 (40th)	Johan Rheborg	Four Shades of Brown	Kjell Levrén; Ernst	
2005 (41st)	Krister Henriksson	Sex, Hope and Love	Bertil	
2005 (41st)	Peter Andersson	Mouth to Mouth	Mats	
2005 (41st)	Mikael Persbrandt	Bang Bang Orangutang	Åke Jönsson	
2006 (42nd)	Gustaf Skarsgård	Kidz in da Hood	Johan Sahlén	
2006 (42nd)	Jonas Karlsson	Offside	Anders	
2006 (42nd)	Anastasios Soulis	Suddenly	Jonas	
2007 (43rd)	Michael Segerström	Darling	Bernard	
2007 (43rd)	Jonas Karlsson	To Love Someone	Hannes	
2007 (43rd)	Leonard Terfelt	Leo	Leo	
2008 (44th)	Mikael Persbrandt	Everlasting Moments	Sigfrid Larsson	
2008 (44th)	Gustaf Skarsgård	Patrik, Age 1.5	Göran Skoogh	
2008 (44th)	Peter Stormare	Wolf	Klemens	
2009 (45th)	Claes Ljungmark	A Rational Solution	Sven-Erik	
2009 (45th)	Olle Sarri	The Ape	Krister	
2009 (45th)	Björn A. Ling	Bröllopsfotografen	Robin	
2010 (46th)	Joel Kinnaman	Easy Money	Johan "JW" Westlund	
2010 (46th)	Sebastian Hiort af Ornäs	Sebbe	Sebbe	
2010 (46th)	Bill Skarsgård	Simple Simon	Simon	
2011 (47th)	Sven-Bertil Taube	A One-Way Trip to Antibes	George	
2011 (47th)	Mikael Persbrandt	Stockholm East	Johan	
2011 (47th)	Kevin Vaz	Play	Kevin	
2012 (48th)	Johannes Brost	Avalon	Janne	
2012 (48th)	Bengt C.W. Carlsson	Lycka till och ta hand om varandra	Alvar	
2012 (48th)	Matias Varela	Easy Money II: Hard to Kill	Jorge Salinas Barrio	
2013 (49th)	Mikael Persbrandt	Nobody Owns Me	Hasse	
2013 (49th)	Robert Gustafsson	The Hundred-Year-Old Man Who Climbed Out the Window and Disappeared	Allan Karlsson	
2013 (49th)	Matias Varela	Easy Money III: Life Deluxe	Jorge Salinas Barrio	
2014 (50th)	Sverrir Gudnason	Flugparken	Kristian Keskitalo	
2014 (50th)	David Dencik	Gentlemen	Henry Morgan	
2014 (50th)	Johannes Bah Kuhnke	Force Majeure	Tomas	
2015 (51st)	Rolf Lassgård	A Man Called Ove	Ove	
2015 (51st)	Ulrik Munther	The Here After	John	
2015 (51st)	Filip Berg	Eternal Summer	Isak	
2016 (52nd)	Anders Mossling	The Yard	11811	
2016 (52nd)	Lennart Jähkel	Granny´s Dancing on the Table	The Father	
2016 (52nd)	Milan Dragišić	My Aunt in Sarajevo	Zlatan	
2016 (52nd)	Jonathan Silén	The Modern Project	Simon	
2017 (53rd)	Fares Fares	The Nile Hilton Incident	Noredin Mostafa	
2017 (53rd)	Claes Bang	The Square	Christian	
2017 (53rd)	Reine Brynolfsson	Ravens	Agne	
2017 (53rd)	Sverrir Gudnason	Borg McEnroe	Björn Borg	
2018 (54th)	Joakim Sällquist	Goliath	Roland	
2018 (54th)	Fredrik Dahl	Amateurs	Musse	
2018 (54th)	Sebastian Ljungblad	Goliath	Kimmie	
2018 (54th)	Mikael Persbrandt	The Cake General	Hasse P	
2019 (55th)	Levan Gelbakhiani	And Then We Danced	Merab	
2019 (55th)	Jonas Karlsson	The Perfect Patient	Hannes Råstam	
2019 (55th)	Johannes Kunhke	Jag kommer hem igen till jul	Anders	
2019 (55th)	Gustaf Skarsgård	438 dagar	Martin Schibbye	
2019 (55th)	Matias Varela	438 dagar	Johan Persson	
2020 (56th)	Uje Brandelius	Spring Uje spring	Uje Brandelius	
2020 (56th)	Adel Darwish	Ghabe	Monir	
2020 (56th)	Rolf Lassgård	My Father Marianne	Lasse / Marianne	
2020 (56th)	Johan Rheborg	Orca	Claes	

== See also ==
- Academy Award for Best Actor
- BAFTA Award for Best Actor in a Leading Role
- Critics Choice Movie Award for Best Actor
- Golden Globe Award for Best Actor – Motion Picture Drama
- Golden Globe Award for Best Actor – Motion Picture Musical or Comedy
- Screen Actors Guild Award for Outstanding Performance by a Male Actor in a Leading Role
