= 11th Guldbagge Awards =

Annual Swedish film awards ceremony

- Date: 13 October 1975
- Site: Operaterrassen, Stockholm, Sweden

Highlights
- Best Picture: The Last Adventure

The 11th Guldbagge Awards ceremony, presented by the Swedish Film Institute, honored the best Swedish films of 1974 and 1975, and took place on 13 October 1975. The Last Adventure directed by Jan Halldoff was presented with the award for Best Film.

== Awards ==
- Best Film: The Last Adventure by Jan Halldoff
- Best Director: Hans Alfredson for Egg! Egg! A Hardboiled Story
- Best Actor: Göran Stangertz for The Last Adventure
- Best Actress: Lis Nilheim for Maria
- Special Achievement: Per Åhlin for Dunderklumpen!
