= Wallis Grahn =

Swedish actress (1945-2018)

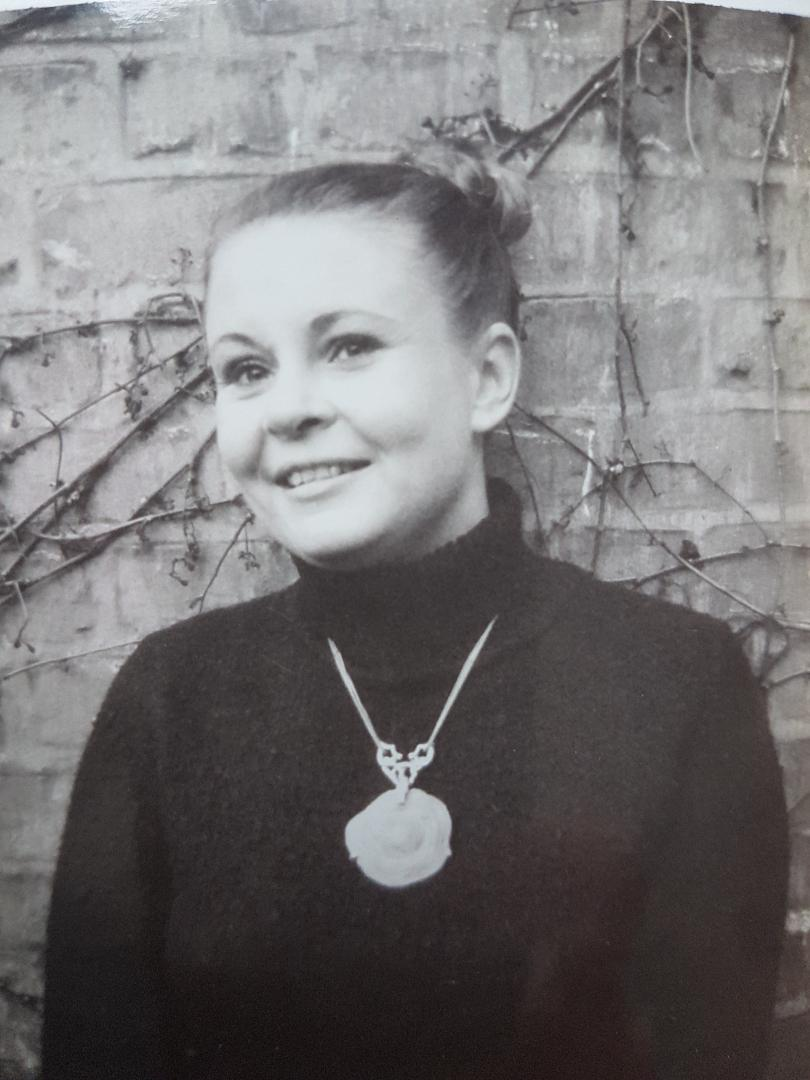
- Wallis Grahn outside the theatre Intiman in Malmö, Sweden 1983
- Born: 13 February 1945; Stockholm, Sweden
- Died: 18 January 2018 (aged 72); Stockholm, Sweden
- Occupation: Actress

Wallis Grahn (13 February 1945 – 18 January 2018) was a Swedish actress.

== Biography ==
Grahn grew up in a working-class family, something she considered to be significant for her work as an actress. She went to Stockholm's music classes and Adolf Fredrik's Music School. She initially planned to become a writer or journalist but was persuaded by Per Ragnar to seek a theater education at Marieborg Folk High School in Norrköping in 1964. In 1965 she joined the Marionette Theater in Stockholm, and from 1967 to 1970 she studied at the Scenen School in Malmö. Between 1980 and 2005, Grahn worked as an actress at Malmö City Theatre.

In addition to the theater, Grahn was an actor in film and television. In 1974, she played in Jan Halldoff's The Last Adventure. That same year she played Vera in the play Jösses Flickor befrielsen är nära, directed by Suzanne Osten, and also participated in the play's soundtrack recording. Osten wrote the role of the movie guard in her debut film Mamma (1982) especially for Grahn.

Grahn also had roles in The Simple-Minded Murderer, Night of the Orangutan, Babels hus, Eva & Adam, Svenska Slut, Goltuppen, Morrhår och ärtor, Rederiet, and Henning Mankell's The Fifth Woman.

Grahn died in Stockholm, at the age of 72.

== Selected filmography ==
- 1977 – Mackan
- 1981 – Babels hus (TV)
- 1981 – Pelle Svanslös
- 1981 – The Simple-Minded Murder
- 1982 – Profitörerna (TV)
- 1984 – Slagskämpen
- 1986 – Anmäld försvunnen (TV)
- 1986 – Morrhår och ärtor
- 1989 – 1939
- 1992–93 – Rederiet (TV)
- 1993 – Roseanna
- 1995 – Torntuppen (TV)
- 1996 – Att stjäla en tjuv
- 1999 – Eva & Adam (TV)
- 2002 – Den 5:e kvinnan
- 2002 – Svenska Slut (TV)
- 2003 – The Man Who Smiled
- 2005 – Wallander – Innan frosten
- 2006 – LasseMajas detektivbyrå (TV series)
- 2009 – Andra Avenyn (TV)
- 2009 – Wallander – Skulden
