= The Pig Hunt =

The Pig Hunt may refer to:

- Pig Hunt
- Grisjakten or The Pig Hunt
