= The Simple-Minded Murderer =

1982 Swedish drama film

- Swedish cover.
- Den Enfaldige Mördaren
- Directed by: Hans Alfredson
- Written by: Hasse Alfredson
- Starring: Stellan Skarsgård; Hasse Alfredson; Maria Johansson
- Narrated by: Stellan Skarsgård
- Cinematography: Rolf Lindström, Jörgen Persson
- Edited by: Jan Persson
- Music by: Rolf Sersam, Giuseppe Verdi
- Distributed by: Svensk Filmindustri (SF)
- Release date: 12 February 1982 (Sweden)
- Running time: 108 minutes
- Country: Sweden
- Language: Swedish

The Simple-Minded Murderer (Swedish: Den enfaldige mördaren) is a 1982 Swedish drama film directed by Hans Alfredson, starring Stellan Skarsgård as the feeble-minded Sven Olsson. It was released to cinemas in Sweden on 12 February 1982.

== Plot ==
The story takes place in 1930s Skåne, Sweden, and focuses on Sven, who is hare-lipped and thus cannot speak correctly. Most people consider him stupid, and call him an idiot.

The film begins with Sven and a woman, who we later learn is called Anna, driving a Horch 830 motor car across the landscape. The sun is setting, and in the sky Sven sees three angels. He and Anna hide in an old house, and while Anna makes herself comfortable, Sven throws a huge, bloodstained blade into a well. He lies down beside Anna and starts his inner monologue about how it all began.

When Sven's mother died, he was "taken care of" by Höglund (Hans Alfredsson), an evil, rich factory owner who is a member of the local Swedish Nazi party, and lives on a farm. Sven must work on Höglund's farm without payment, and sleep among cows in the stables, where he is tormented by a rat. Being very goodhearted, Sven cannot make himself drown the animal once he has caught it, because he simply can't take another life.

Having read the Bible, a gift from his sister, Sven imagines he is visited by three angels from time to time, whom he speaks to in a clear voice, making it clear that this dialog takes place in his own mind. One day he meets the wheelchair-using Anna (Maria Johansson), whom he falls in love with, and having been mistreated at Höglund's, Sven escapes to Anna's family, who gladly take him in. At Anna's house, Sven is finally treated as an adult. He is given a real bed, gets to work at their own farm, and is paid by Anna's father, Mr. Andersson (Per Myrberg), "in real money", as he points out when Höglund comes and wants to take Sven back to his farm. Although Andersson wins the argument, Sven faints from fear.

Sven decides to buy himself a motorcycle, a real Indian. But Höglund, now out for revenge, pulls some strings and uses his contacts to ensure Sven can't get a driver's license. After a long media battle arranged by Andersson, Sven gets his license and starts riding his motorcycle around town. Höglund, however, does not surrender that easily. The Anderssons' farm is thrown in financial crisis, and Höglund's new chauffeur (Gösta Ekman) steals Sven's motorcycle and destroys it.

Anna starts to scream at Sven, in her desperation blaming him for all that has happened. Sven angrily pushes her out of her wheelchair, but immediately regrets it. Furious at Höglund, and all the pain he has put Sven and his loved ones through, Sven takes the blade from Andersson's chaff cutter, and marches off to Höglund's factory, followed by the three angels singing Verdi's Requiem. Attacking Höglund, Sven steals the evil man's car, then picks up Anna on the run, taking her to the deserted house where the movie begins. It begins to dawn and police start to surround the building. The Anderssons beg for Sven's life. A couple of shots are heard, and the film ends with a picture of the sun rising over the southern Swedish landscape.

== Cast ==
- Stellan Skarsgård as Sven
- Maria Johansson as Anna
- Hans Alfredson as Höglund
- Per Myrberg as Andersson
- Lena-Pia Bernhardsson as Mrs. Andersson
- Nils Ahlroth as Månsson
- Lars Amble as Bengt
- Carl-Åke Eriksson as Wallin
- Cecilia Walton as Vera
- Wallis Grahn as Mrs. Höglund
- Else-Marie Brandt as Sven's mother
- Gösta Ekman as The new driver
- Carl Billquist as Flodin
- Lena Nyman as Woman without legs
- Björn Andrésen as Angel

== Awards and reception ==
The film was loved by critics and viewers alike. It won the awards for Best Director (Hans Alfredsson), Best Film and Best Actor (Skarsgård) at the 18th Guldbagge Awards. Skarsgård also won the Silver Bear for Best Actor at the 32nd Berlin International Film Festival for his role as Sven.

The well-known Swedish film director Ingmar Bergman also enjoyed the film. Calling it: "A deep indignation, turned into a powerful fairy-tale. Hasse Alfredssons resources seem unlimited and my admiration for his creativity and the wealth of his ideas are absolute".

== Production ==
The story is based on a short chapter in Alfredson's book En ond man (An Evil Man). The chapter was called "Idiotens berättelse" ("The Idiot's Story") and was an inner monologue held by the then nameless narrator. Another inspiration for the movie came when Alfredson first heard Requiem by Giuseppe Verdi, a piece of music he found very powerful and knew he wanted to use in a movie.

Alfredson has stated in an interview that the character of Sven is loosely based on a real person, named Hans, whom he once knew. Höglund is also based on a real person and a scene from the movie, when Höglund throws a poor farmers money into the fireplace on Christmas Eve is based on a true story.

In preparation for the role as the evil Höglund, Alfredson used to curse and stamp on the ground in order to get really angry.
