= Kejsaren =

1979 film

- Directed by: Jösta Hagelbäck
- Written by: Jösta Hagelbäck; Sten Holmberg; Birgitta Trotzig
- Produced by: Anna-Lena Wibom
- Starring: Anders Åberg
- Cinematography: Sten Holmberg
- Edited by: Peter Emanuel Falck
- Release date: 24 February 1979
- Running time: 97 minutes
- Country: Sweden
- Language: Swedish

Kejsaren is a 1979 Swedish drama film directed by Jösta Hagelbäck. At the 15th Guldbagge Awards, Anders Åberg won the award for Best Actor. It was entered into the 29th Berlin International Film Festival, where cinematographer Sten Holmberg won the Silver Bear for an outstanding single achievement.

== Cast ==
- Anders Åberg - Elje Ström
- Sigurd Björling - Vicar
- Grazyna Brattander - Polish whore
- Kent-Arne Dahlgren - Matros
- Jan Dolata - Pimp
- Rune Ek - Farmhand
- Gunnar Ekström - Anton
- Göte Fyhring - Rättare
- Per Gavelius - Harbour Guard
- Ralf Glaerum - Kock
- Olle Grönstedt - Man i keps
- Gerissa Jalander - Moder
- Jan Jönsson - Dåre
- Anne-Lie Kinnunen - Sångerska
- Jan Kruse - Embassy official
