= Anders Åberg (actor) =

Swedish actor (1948–2020)

- Born: 4 September 1948; Gothenburg, Sweden
- Died: 8 March 2020 (aged 71)
- Occupation: Actor
- Years active: 1979–2000

Anders Åberg (born 4 September 1948 – 8 March 2020) was a Swedish actor. At the 15th Guldbagge Awards he won the award for Best Actor for his role in Kejsaren. He appeared in twelve films and television shows between 1979 and 2000.

== Selected filmography ==
- Långt bort och nära / Near and Far Away (1976)
- Kejsaren / The Emperor (1979)
- Andra dansen / Second Dance (1983)
- Sömnen / Sleep (1984)
