= False as Water =

1985 film

- Swedish poster
- Directed by: Hans Alfredson
- Written by: Hans Alfredson
- Produced by: Hans Alfredson; Waldemar Bergendahl
- Starring: Malin Ek
- Cinematography: Jörgen Persson
- Edited by: Jan Persson
- Music by: Stefan Nilsson
- Production companies: Svensk Filmindustri; Svenska Ord
- Distributed by: Svensk Filmindustri
- Release date: 8 November 1985
- Running time: 102 minutes
- Country: Sweden
- Language: Swedish

False as Water (Swedish: Falsk som vatten) is a 1985 Swedish drama film directed by Hans Alfredson. Alfredson won the award for Best Director and Malin Ek won the award for Best Actress at the 21st Guldbagge Awards.

== Cast ==
- Malin Ek as Clara
- Sverre Anker Ousdal as John
- Marie Göranzon as Anna (as Mari Göranzon)
- Stellan Skarsgård as Stig
- Örjan Ramberg as Carl
- Lotta Ramel as Fia
- Philip Zandén as Jens (as Philip Zanden)
- Catharina Alinder as Tina
- Martin Lindström as Lill-John
- Magnus Uggla as Schüll, shop owner
- Folke Lind as The Old Man
- Ing-Marie Carlsson as Göteborgskan
- Gunilla Olsson as New Tenant (as Gunilla Ohlsson)
- Jan Wirén as Doctor (as Jan Wiren)
