= Honeymoon (1972 film) =

1972 film

- Directed by: Claes Lundberg
- Written by: Claes Lundberg
- Starring: Lena-Pia Bernhardsson
- Cinematography: John Olsson
- Edited by: Lars Hagström
- Release date: 22 May 1972
- Running time: 110 minutes
- Country: Sweden
- Language: Swedish

Honeymoon (Swedish: Smekmånad) is a 1972 Swedish drama film directed by Claes Lundberg. It was entered into the 22nd Berlin International Film Festival.

== Cast ==
- Lena-Pia Bernhardsson as Eva
- Carl Billquist as Salesman
- Christer Enderlein as Carl
- Lena Lindgren as Inger
- Tord Peterson as Manager of Konsum
- Meta Velander as Mrs. Erikson
- Marvin Yxner as Tarzan
