= 1st Guldbagge Awards =

Annual Swedish film awards ceremony

- Date: 25 September 1964
- Site: Grand Hôtel Royal, Stockholm

Highlights
- Best Picture: The Silence

The 1st Guldbagge Awards ceremony, presented by the Swedish Film Institute, honored the best Swedish 1963 and 1964, and took place on 25 September 1964. The Silence directed by Ingmar Bergman was presented with the award for Best Film.

== Awards ==
- Best Film: The Silence by Ingmar Bergman
- Best Director: Ingmar Bergman for The Silence
- Best Actor: Keve Hjelm for Raven's End
- Best Actress: Ingrid Thulin for The Silence
