= Hans Alfredson =

Swedish author, actor, comedian and film director (1931–2017)

Hasse Alfredson
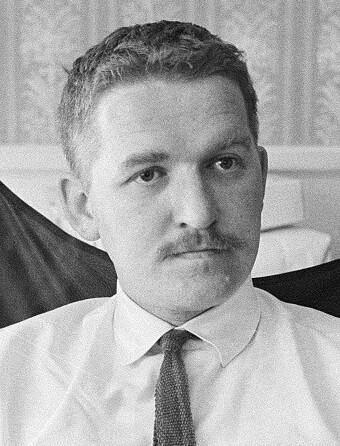
- Alfredson in 1963
- Born: Hans Folke Alfredson; 28 June 1931; Malmö, Sweden
- Died: 10 September 2017 (aged 86); Stockholm, Sweden
- Occupations: Actor, film director, writer, comedian
- Years active: 1948–2012
- Known for: Hasse & Tage
- Children: 4; including Daniel and Tomas

Hans Folke "Hasse" Alfredson (28 June 1931 – 10 September 2017) was a Swedish actor, film director, writer, and comedian. Born in Malmö, Sweden, he is known for his collaboration with Tage Danielsson as the duo Hasse & Tage and their production company AB Svenska Ord ("Swedish Words Ltd"). His most celebrated contribution to their brand of humorist humanism was his ability to extemporize wildly absurd comic situations, for example in the Lindeman dialogues.

Towards the end of his life, Alfredson made it clear that he preferred his real name, Hans, over the commonly used nickname "Hasse".

He was the father of directors Daniel and Tomas Alfredson.

== Career ==
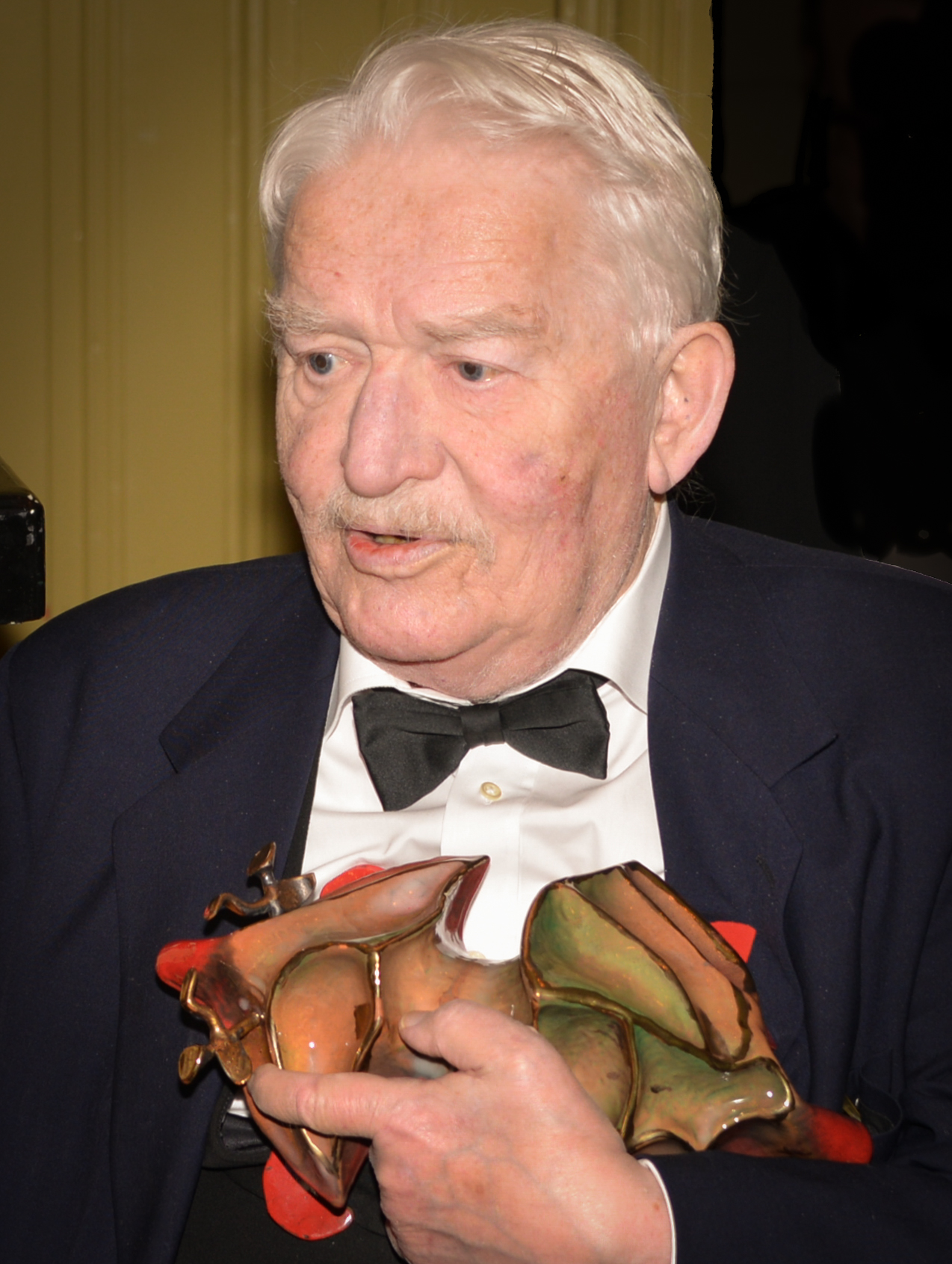
Alfredson in 2013

Through his collaboration with Danielsson, with whom he produced several revue shows and films, Alfredson became one of Sweden's best-known comedians and a major, enduringly popular celebrity. Already in 1970, however, he performed a less sympathetic role in Grisjakten. Later in his life, Alfredson would more or less completely turn around to become an author and director of serious, non-comedic works. In 1982 he directed and starred as the antagonist in the film The Simple-Minded Murderer, based on his novel En ond man (An evil man). With just a brief return to revue comedy in 1984, he rarely revisited the genre after the 1985 death of Tage Danielsson. In addition to shows and movies, he authored numerous books, including Monty Python-style comedies as well as tragic and melancholy works.

Between 1992 and 1994, Alfredson was head of the open-air museum Skansen in Stockholm.

In the mid-00s, Alfredson participated in the Danish TV series The Eagle. His last cinematic work was the 2009 adaption of Stieg Larsson's novel The Girl Who Kicked the Hornets' Nest, directed by his son Daniel Alfredson.

== Awards ==
His work, alone and with Danielsson, won several awards. At the 11th Guldbagge Awards, he won the Best Director award for his 1975 film Egg! Egg! A Hardboiled Story. His 1981 film The Simple-Minded Murderer won three awards at the 18th Guldbagge Awards and was entered into the 32nd Berlin International Film Festival. His 1985 film False as Water won the award for Best Director at the 21st Guldbagge Awards.

== Selected works ==
=== Acting ===
- 1958: A Difficult Parish – Redaktör
- 1963: Havoc in Heaven – Storyteller (Sweden) (voice)
- 1964: Swedish Portraits – Timjan
- 1965: Docking the Boat – Garbo
- 1967: Stimulantia – Jacob Landelius
- 1967: Skrållan, Ruskprick och Knorrhane – Ruskprick
- 1968: Lådan
- 1968: Shame – Fredrik Lobelius, antikhandlare
- 1968: Out of an Old Man's Head – Gubben – Johan Björk
- 1970: Grisjakten – Lennart Siljeberg
- 1970: Pippi on the Run – Konrad
- 1971: The Emigrants – Jonas Petter
- 1971: The Apple War – Severin Lindberg
- 1972: The New Land – Jonas Petter
- 1974: Dunderklumpen! – Bee (voice)
- 1974: Gangsterfilmen – Manager at the pool hall
- 1975: Egg! Egg! A Hardboiled Story – Tramp
- 1975: Release the Prisoners to Spring – Erlandsson
- 1977: Games of Love and Loneliness – Freutiger
- 1978: The Adventures of Picasso – Don José
- 1981: Sista budet – Joakim Berger
- 1981: SOPOR – Åtskilliga typer
- 1982: The Simple-Minded Murder – Höglund
- 1983: P & B – Drunkard
- 1985: False as Water – Clara's Father (uncredited)
- 1987: Jim & piraterna Blom – Kolavippen
- 1989: The Journey to Melonia – Slagg (voice)
- 1990: Macken – Roy's & Roger's Bilservice – Edvard, the father
- 1991: The Great Day on the Beach – Morfar
- 1992: The Best Intentions – Kyrkoherde Gransjö
- 1993: Drömkåken – Hans Alfredson
- 1996: Jerusalem – Mats Hök
- 1996: Private Confessions (TV Movie) – Biskop Agrell
- 1999: Sophie's World – Socrates
- 2000: Hundhotellet – Sture (voice)
- 2004: Dag och Natt – Bilisten
- 2008: Everlasting Moments – Prison Guard
- 2009: Gnomes and Trolls: The Secret Chamber – Leif (voice)
- 2009: The Girl Who Kicked the Hornets' Nest – Evert Gullberg
- 2012: Isdraken – Janitor

=== Directing ===
- 1975: Egg! Egg! A Hardboiled Story
- 1982: The Simple-Minded Murderer
- 1983: P & B
- 1985: False as Water
- 1987: Jim & Piraterna Blom
- 1988: Vargens tid

=== Books ===
- 1961: En liten bok om att bränna löv, ris, kvistar och annat avfall i ett hörn av trädgården
- 1962: Ernst Semmelmans minnen
- 1963: Gentlemannens årsbok. Kalender från Mosebacke (with Carl-Uno Sjöblom)
- 1965: Blommig falukorv och andra bitar för barn
- 1966: Gummitummen - Skizzer ur en fren dagbok
- 1967: Å, vilken härlig fred! (with Tage Danielsson)
- 1967: Rosa rummet eller Operabaren eller dylikt
- 1968: F. En överdriven äventyrsberättelse
- 1968: Varför är det så ont om Q? (for children)
- 1975: Ägget är löst
- 1976: Bästa vägen till Muckle Flugga (with Kim Meurling)
- 1976: Svea Hunds limerickar
- 1979: Den befjädrade ormen
- 1980: Varför stirrar ni på mina fötter? (with Stig Claesson)
- 1980: En ond man
- 1981: Tiden är ingenting
- 1983: Lagens långa näsa (21 crime fiction short stories)
- 1985: En något större bok (collection)
- 1986: Svenska Ord i toner (with Tage Danielsson)
- 1986: Jim & piraterna Blom (with Stellan Skarsgård and Stina Jofs)
- 1986: Vanliga palsternackan för gottegrisar året 1987 (with Povel Ramel)
- 1990: Nilsson & Olsson or Lämmeleffekten (stage play)
- 1991: När månen gick förbi (with illustrations by Per Åhlin) (for children)
- 1992: En yxa i nacken
- 1992: När Soft var barn (with illustrations by Per Åhlin)
- 1993: Septemberfortaellinger
- 1994: Avbrott
- 1996: Blomstervers (poems, with illustrations by Klara Alfredson)
- 1996: Attentatet i Pålsjö skog
- 1998: Varje dag en fest (with Kim Meurling) (illustrated by Per Åhlin).
- 1999: De döda kring Maria
- 2001: Nytidens slott och herresäten (with Lars Olson)
- 2004: Åtta glas (short story)
- 2004: Grus – släkten som förändrade världen (with illustrations by Per Åhlin)
