= Ingmar Bergman Award =

Swedish film award from 1978 to 2007

- Location: Stockholm
- Country: Sweden
- Presented by: Ingmar Bergman; Swedish Film Institute
- Rewards: Bronze plaque and cash
- First award: 1978
- Final award: 2007
- Website: http://www.sfi.se/sv/svensk-filmdatabas/guldbaggelistan/Historik1/Kjell-Furberg/

The Ingmar Bergman Award was a Swedish film award, distributed between 1978 and 2007 by the Swedish Film Institute. It was instituted by legendary Swedish film director Ingmar Bergman, as a complement to the Guldbagge Awards. The jury consisted of Ingmar Bergman and the CEO of the Swedish Film Institute. The recipients were awarded a bronze plaque, depicting Bergman's face, and a sum of money. The award was first presented at the 14th Guldbagge Awards, and continued until Bergman's death in 2007.

== History ==
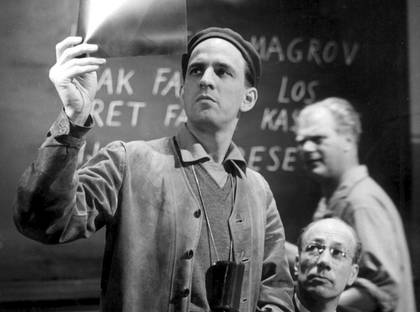
Ingmar Bergman, on the set of Wild Strawberries (1957)

The Ingmar Bergman award was primarily intended to honour achievements in Swedish film which had not otherwise been considered when the Guldbagge Awards were handed out. As a filmmaker with extensive experience, Bergman was aware of how filmmaking requires delicate cooperation between many different people. He knew how important each specialty is to the finished result, and that a film is never better than the weakest link in that complex teamwork. Bergman never forgot the often overlooked categories of film workers. The goal of the award was to pay attention to all the professions which rarely received attention.

The jury comprised Bergman himself and the CEO of the Swedish Film Institute. It was first awarded at the 14th Guldbagge Awards, and was handed out to the film editor Wic Kjellin, by the departing CEO of the Swedish Film Institute, Harry Schein. From this ceremony through the 42nd Guldbagge Awards, the award was presented annually, except for the years 1984, 1989 and 1990. The Award soon covered the entire filmmaking process, as the prize has gone to everything from script students at the Swedish Institute of Dramatic Art, to the legendary projectionist, Henry Nyberg, in 1986.

The award has also been presented to other types of filmmakers: screenwriters, costume designers, makeup artists, script girls, studio managers, production managers, lighting directors and cameramen. Only five performers won the award; among them are Lena Olin, Gunnar Björnstrand and Mikael Persbrandt.

== The award ==
The award consisted of a sum of money (SEK 60,000 at the end) and a bronze plaque with the Bergmans face in relief, made by the Finnish sculptor Eila Hiltunen. The plaque shows Bergman shyly lowering the gaze. Bergman's vote was the decisive vote when selecting the winner, and he also wrote the often very spiritual justification; the CEO of the Swedish Film Institute presented the award at the ceremony.

== Recipients ==
Year	Recipient	Profession	Notes	Award
1977/1978	Wic Kjellin	Film editor	—	Plaque and money
1978/1979	Lars Karlsson	Cameraman	—	Plaque and money
1979/1980	Lena Olin	Actress	—	Plaque and money
1980/1981	Lasse Åberg	Actor	"for his performance in Sällskapsresan."	Plaque and money
1981/1982	Gustav Roger	Studio manager	—	Plaque and money
1982/1983	Gunnar Björnstrand	Actor	—	Plaque and money
1984	—	—	No award	—
1985	Kerstin Eriksdotter	Script girl	"for the editing of Dansaren."	Plaque and money
1986	Henry Nyberg	Projectionist	—	Plaque and money
1987	Ulf Berggren	Film importer	—	Plaque and money
1987	Inger Pehrsson	Fashion designer	—	Plaque and money
1988	Lars-Owe Carlberg *	Production leader	—	Plaque and money
1989	—	—	No award	—
1990	—	—	No award	—
1991	Inga Adolfsson	Film restorer	"for the loving care of the cinematography sources"	Plaque and money
1991	Georg af Klercker *	Director	—	Plaque and money
1992	Gunnar Fischer	Cinematographer	—	Plaque and money
1993	Jannike Åhlund	Journalist and film critic	—	Plaque and money
1994	Richard Hobert	Screenwriter and director	—	Plaque and money
1995	Rune Waldekranz	Film producer	—	Plaque and money
1996	Nils Melander	Light setter	—	Plaque and money
1997	Agneta Fagerström-Olsson	Director, producer and screenwriter	—	Plaque and money
1997	Peter Birro	Screenwriter	—	Plaque and money
1998	Cilla Drott	Makeup artist	—	Plaque and money
1999	Torun Lian	Playwright and film director	—	Plaque and money
2000	Antonia Pyk	Scripts student at the Swedish Institute of Dramatic Art	—	Plaque and money
2000	Daniel Karlsson	Scripts student at the Swedish Institute of Dramatic Art	—	Plaque and money
2000	Erik Ahrnbom	Scripts student the Swedish Institute of Dramatic Art	—	Plaque and money
2000	Josefine Broman	Scripts student at the Swedish Institute of Dramatic Art	—	Plaque and money
2000	Linn Gottfridsson	Scripts student at the Swedish Institute of Dramatic Art	—	Plaque and money
2000	Mårten Klingberg	Scripts student at the Swedish Institute of Dramatic Art	—	Plaque and money
2001	Reza Parsa	Director	"for his performance in Meeting Evil."	Plaque and money
2002	Vilgot Sjöman	Director	—	Plaque and money
2003	Klaus Härö	Director	—	Plaque and money
2004	Mikael Persbrandt	Actor	—	Plaque and money
2005	Åse Kleveland	Singer and politician	—	Plaque and money
2006	Angela Kovács	Actress	—	Plaque and money

- * (Posthumous)
