= 15th Guldbagge Awards =

Annual Swedish film awards ceremony

- Date: 24 September 1979
- Site: Operakällaren, Stockholm, Sweden

Highlights
- Best Picture: A Respectable Life

The 15th Guldbagge Awards ceremony, presented by the Swedish Film Institute, honored the best Swedish films of 1978 and 1979, and took place on 24 September 1979. A Respectable Life directed by Stefan Jarl was presented with the award for Best Film.

== Awards ==
- Best Film: A Respectable Life by Stefan Jarl
- Best Director: Stefan Jarl for A Respectable Life
- Best Actor: Anders Åberg for Kejsaren
- Best Actress: Sif Ruud for A Walk in the Sun
- Special Achievement: Keve Hjelm for Godnatt, jord
- The Ingmar Bergman Award: Lars Karlsson
