= Egg! Egg! A Hardboiled Story =

1975 film

- Film poster
- Directed by: Hans Alfredson
- Written by: Hans Alfredson
- Starring: Gösta Ekman
- Cinematography: Lars Swanberg
- Release date: 17 March 1975
- Running time: 107 minutes
- Country: Sweden
- Language: Swedish

Egg! Egg! A Hardboiled Story (Swedish: Ägget är löst!, alternative title The Softening of the Egg) is a 1975 Swedish black comedy film directed by Hans Alfredson, starring Gösta Ekman, Max von Sydow and Birgitta Andersson. Alfredson won the award for Best Director at the 11th Guldbagge Awards.

== Cast ==
- Gösta Ekman as The Son
- Max von Sydow as The Father
- Birgitta Andersson as The Mother
- Anna Godenius as Girl
- Hans Alfredson as Tramp
- Börje Ahlstedt as Man in Commercial
- Ingvar Petrow (as Ingvar Petrov)
- Jim Hughes as American
- Stig Ossian Ericson as Worker
- Jan Wirén as Worker
- Meg Westergren as Woman in Commercial
- Ola Thulin as Doctor
