= Spring of Joy =

1993 film

- Directed by: Richard Hobert
- Written by: Richard Hobert
- Produced by: Aina Behring
- Starring: Sven Lindberg
- Cinematography: Lars Crépin
- Release date: 12 November 1993
- Running time: 88 minutes
- Country: Sweden
- Language: Swedish

Spring of Joy (Swedish: Glädjekällan) is a 1993 Swedish drama film directed by Richard Hobert. Sven Lindberg won the award for Best Actor at the 29th Guldbagge Awards.

== Cast ==
- Sven Lindberg as Ragnar Persson
- Göran Stangertz as Mick Pierson
- Camilla Lundén as Catti
- Helena Brodin as Ellen Persson
- Gunvor Pontén as Väninna
- Margreth Weivers as Väninna
- Maj Lindström as Väninna
- Stina von Sydow as Markvärdinnan
- Bertil Norström as Tullaren
- Pär Ericson as Tillsyningsman
- Linus Hedberg as Pojken
- Pierre Lindstedt as Bärgaren
- Jerker Fahlström as Kjell bilmekaniker
