= 18th Guldbagge Awards =

Annual Swedish film awards ceremony

- Date: 10 October 1982
- Site: Hamburger Börs, Stockholm, Sweden

Highlights
- Best Picture: The Simple-Minded Murderer

The 18th Guldbagge Awards ceremony, presented by the Swedish Film Institute, honored the best Swedish films of 1981 and 1982, and took place on 10 October 1982. The Simple-Minded Murderer directed by Hans Alfredson was presented with the award for Best Film.

== Awards ==
- Best Film: The Simple-Minded Murderer by Hans Alfredson
- Best Director: Hans Alfredson for The Simple-Minded Murderer
- Best Actor: Stellan Skarsgård for The Simple-Minded Murderer
- Best Actress: Sunniva Lindekleiv, Lise Fjeldstad and Rønnaug Alten for Little Ida
- Special Achievement: Ulf Dageby for Målaren
- The Ingmar Bergman Award: Gustav Roger
