= Dunderklumpen! =

- Theatrical release poster
- Directed by: Per Åhlin
- Written by: Beppe Wolgers
- Produced by: Gunnar Carlsson
- Starring: Beppe Wolgers; Jens Wolgers; Halvar Björk; Håkan Serner; Gösta Ekman; Toots Thielemans; Lotten Strömstedt; Sif Ruud; Birgitta Andersson; Hans Alfredson; Stig Grybe; Bert-Åke Varg
- Cinematography: Lennart Carlsson; Pelle Svensson
- Edited by: Per Åhlin
- Music by: Toots Thielemans
- Production company: G.K. Film
- Distributed by: Europa Film-Stockholm Film
- Release date: 26 September 1974
- Running time: 97 minutes
- Country: Sweden
- Language: Swedish

Dunderklumpen! is a 1974 Swedish family film directed by Per Åhlin, which combines animation and live action. The story involves several musical numbers. It was released on 26 September 1974. At the 11th Guldbagge Awards, Åhlin won a Special Achievement award for the film.

The English dub was released in the United States by G.G. Communications and it debuted on VHS and Betamax on 22 March 1979, distributed by Video Gems and later gave it a theatrical release in June 1979. The film was later re-released on VHS by Starmaker Entertainment in 1989.

== Plot ==
On a summer evening in northern Sweden, when the sun does not quite set, Dunderklumpen, an animated lonely troll-like character, leaves his home in the woods to seek some friends to keep him company. He stumbles upon the home of the Wolgers family, where Dunderklumpen finds toys belonging to a boy named Jens and his younger sister, Camilla. Using his magic, Dunderklumpen brings the toys to life and takes them on an adventure into the woods where he lives. This crew includes Lionel, a small but fiercely brave stuffed toy lion cub wearing oversized polka-dot pants; Doll, a demanding doll; Pellegnillot, a harmonica-playing teddy bear; and Dummy, a stuffed toy rabbit dressed in blue-and-white striped pyjamas and a matching nightcap that covers his ears.

Jens hears and sees the toys crying for help and follows Dunderklumpen, who is not so quick to surrender his new-found company. They are also followed by Jens's father, who goes searching for his runaway son and is accompanied by the dutiful Bumblebee. Dunderklumpen also has a small locked chest (that he took from the children's bedroom) with him, believing it contains a great treasure. One-Eye, an old nemesis of Dunderklumpen, also seeks the treasure for himself and pursues our heroes. No one knows what the contents are, but Dunderklumpen and One-Eye are both sure it is priceless. One-Eye's signature tool is a small counterfeiting machine that he uses to print fake money to beguile the toys and Dunderklumpen.

Following Dunderklumpen into the woods, Jens meets a kind witch named Blossom, who travels on an umbrella and helps him along the way. The gang also meets the flying paper Malte (one of Jens's drawings comes to life), the living and talking mountain Jorm, and an elderly woman named Elvira Fattigan, who is an old friend of One-Eye.

In the end, Elvira reminds One-Eye that his fall from grace came after encountering human materialism, and soon the chest is found to contain a feather, a dandelion, and a pebble that are considered treasures to a child. Realizing that the chest contained no valuables but cherished treasures, everyone celebrates in song and dance. One-Eye becomes friends with Dunderklumpen, the toys stay behind with the both of them, and Jens and his father return home together.

== Cast ==
- Beppe
- Jens
- Kerstin Wolgers
- Camilla Wolgers—Camilla

=== Voices ===
Character	Original	English
Dunderklumpen	Halvar Björk	Kenneth Harvey
Jätten (Jorm)	Halvar Björk	Chuck MacGruder
Lejonel (Lionel)	Håkan Serner	Jerry Sroka
En-Dum-En (Dummy)	Gösta Ekman	Don Scardino
Pellegnillot	Toots Thielemans	Toots Thielemans
Dockan (Doll)	Lotten Strömstedt	Liane Curtis
Elvira Fattigan	Sif Ruud	Paulette Rubinstein
Blomhåret (Blossom)	Birgitta Andersson	Rose Marie Jun
Humlan (Bumblebee)	Hans Alfredson	Jerry Sroka
Enöga (One-Eye)	Stig Grybe	Bill Marine
Huset som pratar (Old House)	Bert-Åke Varg	George Coe
Vattenfallet (Waterfall)	Beppe Wolgers	Herbert Duncan
