= Beyond Sorrow, Beyond Pain =

1983 film

- Directed by: Agneta Elers-Jarleman
- Written by: Mikael Wahlberg; Agneta Elers-Jarleman
- Starring: Agneta Elers-Jarleman; Jean Montgrenier
- Distributed by: Swedish Film Institute
- Release date: 16 September 1983
- Running time: 78 minutes
- Country: Sweden
- Language: Swedish

Beyond Sorrow, Beyond Pain (Swedish: Smärtgränsen) is a 1983 Swedish documentary film directed by Agneta Elers-Jarleman. The film won the Guldbagge Award for Best Film at the 20th Guldbagge Awards.

== Cast ==
- Agneta Elers-Jarleman
- Jean Montgrenier
- Jörgen Herlofson
- Helena Samuelsson
