= 32nd Guldbagge Awards =

1997 Swedish film awards

- Date: February 10 1997
- Site: Blå Hallen, Stockholm, Sweden

Highlights
- Best Picture: Hamsun
- Most awards: Hamsun (4)
- Most nominations: The Hunters (6)

The 32nd Guldbagge Awards ceremony, presented by the Swedish Film Institute, honored the best Swedish films of 1996, and was held on February 10, 1997 in the Blue Hall of Stockholm City Hall. Hamsun directed by Jan Troell was presented with the award for Best Film.

== Winner and nominees ==
=== Awards ===
Best Film: Hamsun; The Hunters; Juloratoriet	Best Director: Kjell Sundvall – The Hunters; Ella Lemhagen – Drömprinsen – Filmen om Em; Kjell-Åke Andersson – Juloratoriet
Best Actress in a leading role: Ghita Nørby – Hamsun; Gunilla Nyroos – Rusar i hans famn; Lina Englund – Vinterviken	Best Actor in a leading role: Max von Sydow – Hamsun; Rolf Lassgård – The Hunters; Gösta Ekman – Nu är pappa trött igen
Best Actress in a Supporting role: Lena Endre – Jerusalem; Viveka Seldahl – Juloratoriet; Chatarina Larsson – Nu är pappa trött igen	Best Actor in a Supporting role: Lennart Jähkel – The Hunters; Sven-Bertil Taube – Jerusalem; Reine Brynolfsson – Jerusalem
Best Screenplay: Per Olov Enquist – Hamsun; Björn Carlström, Kjell Sundvall – The Hunters; Harald Hamrell, Sara Heldt, Mats Wahl– Vinterviken	Best Cinematography: Harald Gunnar Paalgard – Juloratoriet; Kjell Lagerroos – The Hunters; Anders Bohman – Drömprinsen – Filmen om Em
Best Foreign Film: (Denmark) Breaking the Waves – Lars von Trier; (United States) Fargo – Joel Coen; (United Kingdom) Trainspotting – Danny Boyle	Creative Achievement Award: Horst Stadlinger
The Ingmar Bergman Award: Nils Melander
