= Tord Peterson =

Swedish actor (1926–2021)

- Born: 21 April 1926; Stockholm, Sweden
- Died: 11 January 2021 (aged 94)
- Occupation: Actor
- Years active: 1953–2013

Tord Peterson (21 April 1926 – 11 January 2021) was a Swedish actor. From 1953 onwards, he appeared in more than 80 films and television shows.

Peterson died in January 2021, at the age of 94.

== Selected filmography ==
- The Hard Game (1956)
- Nightmare (1965)
- The Shot (1969)
- Grisjakten (1970)
- Honeymoon (1972)
- Faneflukt (1975)
- House of Angels (1992)
- House of Angels – The Second Summer (1994)
- Echoes from the Dead (2013)
