= Grisjakten =

1970 film

Grisjakten (English: "The Pig Hunt"; "gris" = "pig", "jakt" = "hunt") is a 1970 Swedish film, made by Jonas Cornell after a 1968 novel by P. C. Jersild starring Hans Alfredsson and Keve Hjelm The film's genre is difficult to classify, it's an absurdly told story on an absurd matter. It's presumably best described as a non comedy satire. A dry and serious encounter with the Swedish bureaucracy and democracy as of Sweden around 1970. The question "Is everything decided by a parliamentary majority the same as democracy?" (including absurd issues and potentially, in the longer run, pure madness or evilness) is fundamental to this film.

And how civil servants plans and carries out a task which obviously lacks all reasonable explanations. Killing all (very healthy) domestic pigs on a rather large agricultural island and burning the meat. The only reason given, is that the decision indeed is made in a full democratic manner and according to the constitution. Films with some kind of political message were not rare during the 1960s and 1970s, but this film isn't about the usual socialism or capitalism issue.

After the death of the truly beloved Swedish comedian (in the 1960s and 1970s), actor, author and film director Hans Alfredsson in September 2017, the Swedish Public Service television broadcaster SVT, has aired this film several times. This film could well be said to be Alfredsson's first non-comedy work, a side of Alfredsson never seen before.

== Production ==
- Director: Jonas Cornell
- Producer: Göran Lindgren
- Screenplay: P.C. Jersild, Jonas Cornell, Lars Svanberg
- Based on: Grisjakten (novel by P.C. Jersild)
- Cinematography: Lars Svanberg
- Length: 94 minutes
- Swedish release: 11 March 1970

== Plot ==
For unknown, but indeed very democratic reasons, the Swedish government and the parliament (Riksdagen) have decided to "de-porkify" (avsvinifiera) Gotland. All domestic pigs at that Baltic Sea island must be terminated. Killed and then burned. Lennart Siljeberg, Bureau Chief at the so-called Cattle Inspection of the State (Statens Boskapsinspektion abbreviated as SBI) is given the task to organize this commission by Departement Counselor Sivert Gård. Siljeberg doesn't think about why these pigs not instead could be slaughtered, and their meat be consumed. At work, Siljeberg always puts SBI's interests ahead of everything else, and at this occasion it means to organize the "de-porkification" process as smooth as possible, nothing more, nothing less. Meanwhile, Sivert Gård handles the media. And in a studio TV-interview, after have watched a journalistic television spot, in which some farmers dare to make a few complaints, he declares whilst smiling "No there simply cannot be any complaints, we are living in a democradic country. So why should anyone make complaints of a decision made by the government and by the people elected parliament ? It's not possible !". The film includes a few short filmed shots of both living pigs as well as from a real slaughterhouse, but this film is not about pigs nor any kind of hunting.

== Reception ==
Aftonbladet's Jurgen Schildt wrote "Grisjakten has become an ambitious, obsessive, partially funny movie, a tragicomedy that sometime convinces by virtue of its tied sarcasm. But if you find a winner, it is the actor Hans Alfredson." Expressen stated "It almost came as a shock to many that Hans Alfredson, with all his compassion, with such empathy and precision, could perform such an unsympathetic person as the agency manager Siljeberg."

== Awards ==
- Award: The Swedish Film Institute's Quality GrantMore

== Cast ==
- Hans Alfredson - herr Lennart Siljeberg, Bureau Chief at S.B.I., the Cattle Inspection of the State (a fictional bureau)
- Ann-Marie Gyllenspetz - fru Margareta Siljeberg, his wife
- Keve Hjelm - herr Sivert Gård, Departement Counselor
- Tord Peterson - herr John Blenheim-Ahlskog, veterinary, expert at burning of organic matter
- Margit Carlqvist - fru Maud Blenheim-Ahlskog, the veterinary's wife
- Ingvar Kjellson - Captain Gustaf Rosén, from the Swedish Army

and others
