= Geir Hansteen Jörgensen =

Swedish director

Geir Hansteen Jörgensen (born 18 February 1968) is a Swedish television, film and commercials director. His most famous works are probably the film and TV mini-series The New Country and The Soloists. Both have received many awards internationally.

Hansteen Jörgensen was born by artist parents on the Swedish countryside where he, besides painting and drawing started to make short films already as a child. He was educated at The Stockholm Film-school and the Dramatiska Institutet.

== Filmography ==
- Foxfire (1994) (Räveld)
- Exit (1996) (Nöd ut) (short)
- Close Encounter (1997) (Närkontakt)
- Riksorganet (1998)
- La Città Dolente (1998)
- 6th Day (1999) (Sjätte dagen)
- The New Country (2000) (Det nya landet)
- The Soloists (2003) (Solisterna)
