= The New Country =

- Poster
- Written by: Lukas Moodysson; Peter Birro
- Directed by: Geir Hansteen Jörgensen
- Starring: Mike Almayehu; Michalis Koutsogiannakis; Lia Boysen
- Music by: Dan Berglund; Jonas Bohlin; Esbjörn Svensson
- Country of origin: Sweden
- Original language: Swedish

Production
- Producers: Dan Berglund; Tomas Eskilsson; Christer Nilson
- Cinematography: Marek Wieser
- Editor: Fredrik Morheden
- Running time: 232 minutes

Original release
- Release: 4 November 2000

The New Country (Swedish: Det nya landet) is a Swedish mini TV-series and feature film from 2000, directed by Geir Hansteen Jörgensen and written by Peter Birro and Lukas Moodysson. The mini-series version had a huge audience on national television, SVT and the feature film version won more awards around the world than any other Swedish feature in 2001. Some Swedish newspapers and critics has chosen The New Country as best Swedish TV mini-series ever and it is by many considered the beginning of Swedish "multicultural" cinema.

== Plot ==
Two refugees, Ali and Massoud run away from their asylum camp and meet Louise, a former Miss Sweden. Together in an old rusty car they are on the run from the police and old memories through the Swedish summer countryside.

== Cast (main characters) ==
- Mike Almayehu (Ali)
- Michalis Koutsogiannakis (Massoud)
- Lia Boysen (Louise)
