= The Last Adventure (1974 film) =

1974 film

- Directed by: Jan Halldoff
- Written by: Per Gunnar Evander; Jan Halldoff
- Starring: Göran Stangertz
- Cinematography: Hasse Seiden
- Release date: 24 October 1974
- Running time: 115 minutes
- Country: Sweden
- Language: Swedish

The Last Adventure (Swedish: Det sista äventyret) is a 1974 Swedish drama film directed by Jan Halldoff. The film won the award for Best Film and Göran Stangertz won the award for Best Actor at the 11th Guldbagge Awards.

== Plot ==
The film stars Göran Stangertz in his feature-film debut as Jimmy Mattsson, an officer cadet who is dismissed from his military post due to erratic behavior. Struggling under the heavy emotional dominance of his mother and fiancée at home, Jimmy takes a temporary job as a biology teacher and rents his own room. There, he begins an intense and complex relationship with a young student, Helfrid (Ann Zacharias).

As the story progresses, Jimmy's psychological state unravels through escalating jealousy and isolation, eventually leading to a complete nervous collapse and treatment under the care of a well-dressed doctor.

== Cast ==
- Göran Stangertz as Jimmy Mattsson
- Ann Zacharias as Helfrid
- Marianne Aminoff as Jimmy's Mother
- Tomas Bolme as Dr. Davidson
- Åke Lindström as Principal
- Birger Malmsten as Company Commander
- Margit Carlqvist as Sally
- Gösta Krantz as Captain
