= 20th Guldbagge Awards =

Annual Swedish film awards ceremony

- Date: 24 January 1985
- Site: City Hall/Blue Hall, Stockholm, Sweden

Highlights
- Best Picture: Beyond Sorrow, Beyond Pain

The 20th Guldbagge Awards ceremony, presented by the Swedish Film Institute, honored the best Swedish films of 1984, and took place on 24 January 1985. Beyond Sorrow, Beyond Pain directed by Agneta Elers-Jarleman was presented with the award for Best Film.

== Awards ==
- Best Film: Beyond Sorrow, Beyond Pain by Agneta Elers-Jarleman
- Best Director: Hrafn Gunnlaugsson for When the Raven Flies
- Best Actor: Sven Wollter for The Man from Majorca and Sista leken
- Best Actress: Gunilla Nyroos for A Hill on the Dark Side of the Moon
- Special Achievement: Rune Ericson
