= Göran Stangertz =

Swedish actor (1944–2012)

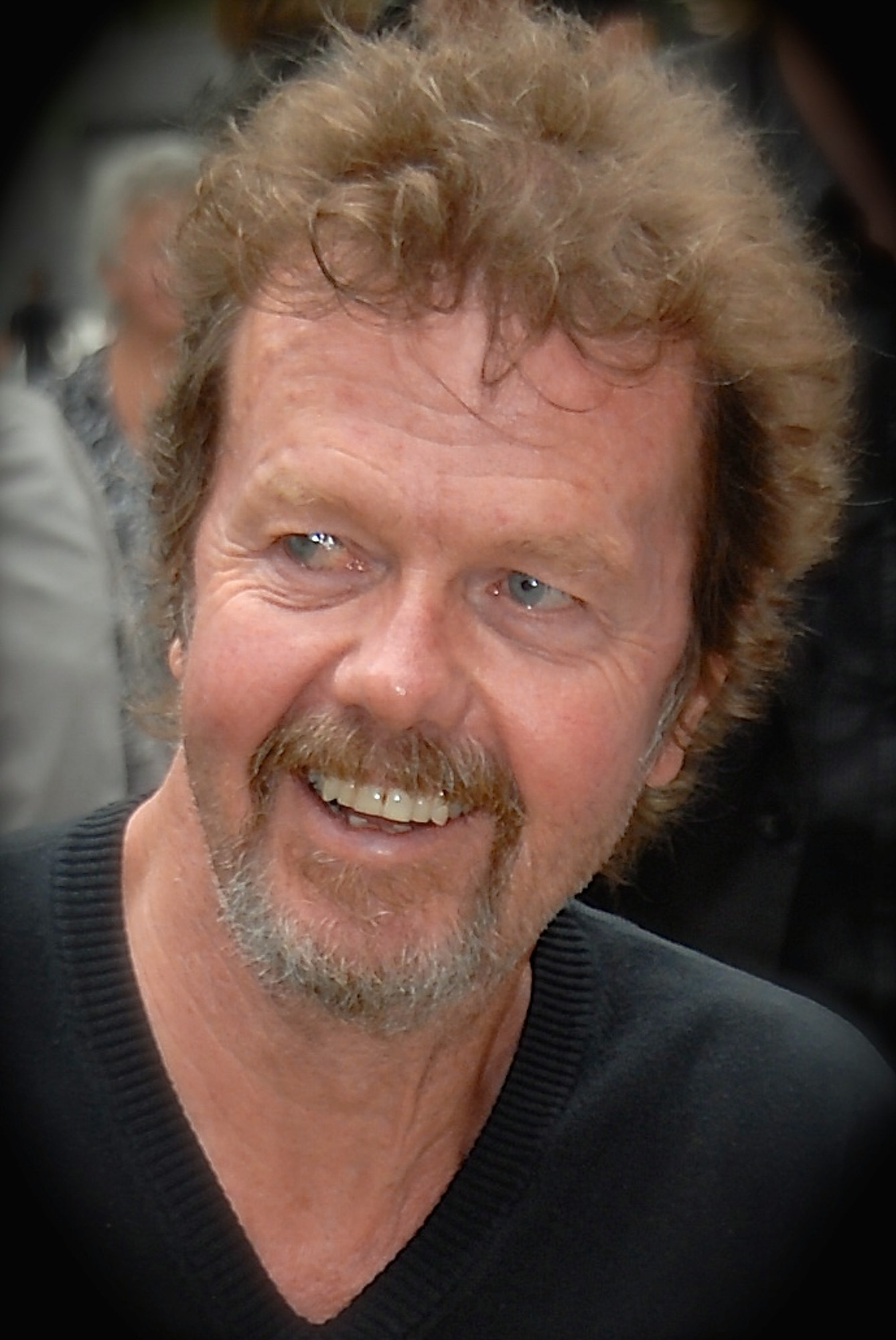
- Göran Stangertz in 2009.
- Born: Göran Nils Robert Stangertz; 19 July 1944; Flen, Sweden
- Died: 27 October 2012 (aged 68); Helsingborg, Sweden
- Occupations: Actor, film director, theater director
- Years active: 1969–2012
- Spouses: Birgitta Zetterberg (m. 1965–1977) Nina Gunke (m. 1980–1984) Jeanette Nevrin (m. 1986–2006) Kajsa Ernst (m. 2009–2012)
- Children: 7

Göran Nils Robert Stangertz (19 July 1944 – 27 October 2012) was a Swedish actor, director and artistic leader at Helsingborgsteatern. He won Sweden's most prestigious film award Guldbagge Award twice in the category best male leading role for his roles in Det sista äventyret ("The Last Adventure") and Spring för livet ("Run for Your Life"). From 2009 and until his death he was married to actress Kajsa Ernst.

Göran Stangertz received his theatrical education in Scenskolan and Göteborg during the years 1964-1967. His first work as an actor was in the film based on Fritiof Nilsson Piraten's novel "Bokhandlaren som slutade bada" ("The bookseller that stopped taking baths") in 1969. In 1977 he played the role of Jack in a film of one of Ulf Lundell's novels. He was participating in the humorous show "Köp mjölk, Skriv bok" ("Buy milk, write book") when he was diagnosed with cancer, and left the work not long before the premiere.

== Filmography ==
List of film credits
Year	Title	Role	Notes
1969	Bokhandlaren som slutade bada	Rikard	
1974	The Last Adventure (Det sista äventyret)	Jimmy Mattsson	
1976	Buddies (Polare)	Kent Fredrikson	
1976	Face to Face	Rapist	
1977	Summer Paradise (Paradistorg)	Puss	
1977	Jack	Jack	
1982	Flight of the Eagle (Ingenjör Andrées luftfärd)	Nils Strindberg	
1988	PS sista sommaren	Bertil	
1993	Spring of Joy (Glädjekällan)	Mick Pierson	
1994	Summer murder (Sommarmord)	J-son	
1995	Höst i paradiset	Mikael	
1997	Run for Your Life (Spring för livet)	Mikael	
1998	Ögat	Mikael	
1999	Där regnbågen slutar	Mikael	
2000	Födelsedagen	Mikael	
2013	Faro	Polismannen / The Police Man	(final film role)
