= 57th Guldbagge Awards =

Annual Swedish film awards ceremony

- Date: 24 January 2022
- Site: Cirkus, Stockholm
- Hosted by: Gina Dirawi

Highlights
- Best Picture: Clara Sola
- Most awards: Clara Sola (5)
- Most nominations: Clara Sola (9)

Television coverage
- Network: SVT

The 57th Guldbagge Awards ceremony, presented by the Swedish Film Institute, honoring the best Swedish films of 2021 and took place on 24 January 2022 at Cirkus in Stockholm. The ceremony was televised by SVT, and was hosted by television presenter Gina Dirawi.

Clara Sola won a leading five awards out of its leading nine nominations.

== Winners and nominees ==
The nominees for the 57th Guldbagge Awards were announced on 16 December 2021 at the Filmhuset, Stockholm, by the Swedish Film Institute.

Winners are listed first and highlighted in boldface.

**Best Film**: **Clara Sola – Nima Yousefi**; The Emigrants – Fredrik Wikström Nicastro; The Most Beautiful Boy in the World – Stina Gardell; Pleasure – Erik Hemmendorff, Eliza Jones, and Markus Waltå; Tigers – Piodor Gustafsson	**Best Director**: **Nathalie Álvarez Mesén – Clara Sola**; Gorki Glaser-Müller – Children of the Enemy; Ninja Thyberg – Pleasure; Ronnie Sandahl – Tigers
**Best Actress in a Leading Role**: **Sofia Kappel – Pleasure as Bella**; Lisa Carlehed – The Emigrants as Kristina; Wendy Chinchilla Araya – Clara Sola as Clara; Cecilia Milocco – Knocking as Molly	**Best Actor in a Leading Role**: **Jonas Karlsson – A Christmas Tale as Tyko Jonsson**; Mustapha Aarab – JJ+E as John-John; Erik Enge – Tigers as Martin Bengtsson; Gustaf Skarsgård – The Emigrants as Karl-Oskar
**Best Actress in a Supporting Role**: **Jennie Silfverhjelm – A Christmas Tale as Marianne Jonsson**; Sofia Helin – The Emigrants as Judit; Liv Mjönes – Tigers as Karin; Carla Sehn – A Christmas Tale as Beata	**Best Actor in a Supporting Role**: **Jonay Pineda Skallak – JJ+E as Sluggo**; Filip Berg – A Christmas Tale as Ruben; Daniel Castañeda Rincón – Clara Sola as Santiago; Magnus Krepper – JJ+E as Frank
**Best Screenplay**: **Clara Sola – Nathalie Álvarez Mesén and Maria Camila Arias**; The Ape Star – Janne Vierth; Sabaya – Hogir Hirori; Suedi – Manuel Concha	**Best Cinematography**: **Clara Sola – Sophie Winqvist Loggins**; The Choir – Ellinor Hallin; Tigers – Marek Septimus Wieser
**Best Editing**: **The Most Beautiful Boy in the World – Hanna Lejonqvist and Dino Jonsäter**; Clara Sola – Marie-Hélène Dozo; Pleasure – Amalie Westerlin Tjellesen and Olivia Neergaard-Holm	**Best Costume Design**: **Pleasure – Amanda Wing Yee Lee**; A Christmas Tale – Ingrid Sjögren; The Emigrants – Louize Nissen
**Best Sound Design**: **Clara Sola – Erick Vargas Williams, Valène Leroy, Charles De Ville, and Aline Gavroy**; Knocking – Thomas Jæger; The Most Beautiful Boy in the World – Brian Dyrby and Kristoffer Salting	**Best Makeup and Hair**: **Pleasure – Erica Spetzig**; A Christmas Tale – Eros Codinas and Love Larson; Red Dot – Therese Sandersson
**Best Original Score**: **Children of the Enemy – Lisa Nordström**; The Emigrants – Johan Söderqvist; The Most Beautiful Boy in the World – Anna von Hausswolff and Filip Leyman	**Best Set Design**: **A Christmas Tale – Michael Higgins**; Knocking – Elle Furudahl; Pleasure – Paula Loos
**Best Visual Effects**: **The Emigrants – Alex Hansson and Torbjörn Olsson**; A Christmas Tale – Martin Malmqvist; Clara Sola – Ronald Grauer	**Best Documentary Feature**: **Sabaya – Hogir Hirori**; Children of the Enemy – Gorki Glaser-Müller; Lena – Isabel Andersson; The Most Beautiful Boy in the World – Kristina Lindström and Kristian Petri
**Best Short Film**: **Man with Doves – Lina Maria Mannheimer**; Bad Lesbian – Simone Norberg; You Are Always 20 – Christer Wahlberg	**Best Foreign Film**: **Flee – Jonas Poher Rasmussen**; The Father – Florian Zeller; Nomadland – Chloé Zhao
**Honorary Award**: **Suzanne Osten, director and screenwriter**	**Gullspiran**: **Johan Hagelbäck, animator**

=== Films with multiple nominations and awards ===
Films with multiple nominations
Nominations	Film
9	Clara Sola
8	A Christmas Tale
7	Pleasure
7	The Emigrants
5	The Most Beautiful Boy in the World
5	Tigers
3	Children of the Enemy
3	JJ+E
3	Knocking
2	Sabaya

Films with multiple wins
Wins	Film
5	Clara Sola
3	A Christmas Tale
3	Pleasure
