= Guldbagge Award for Best Actress in a Supporting Role =

Swedish film award

- Country: Sweden
- Presented by: Swedish Film Institute
- First award: 1995 (for acting in films released during the 1995 film season)
- Currently held by: Eva Melander, Trouble (2024)
- Website: guldbaggen.se

The Guldbagge for Best Actress in a Supporting Role is a Swedish film award presented annually by the Swedish Film Institute (SFI) as part of the Guldbagge Awards (Swedish: "Guldbaggen") to actresses working in the Swedish motion picture industry.

The categories for Best Supporting Actress and Supporting Actor were first introduced in 1995. In 1992, Ernst Günther received a Guldbagge for Creative Efforts, for his supporting role as Gottfrid in House of Angels.

== Winners and nominees ==
Each Guldbagge Awards ceremony is listed chronologically below along with the winner of the Guldbagge Award for Actress in a Supporting Role and the film associated with the award. In the columns under the winner of each award are the other nominees for best supporting actress.

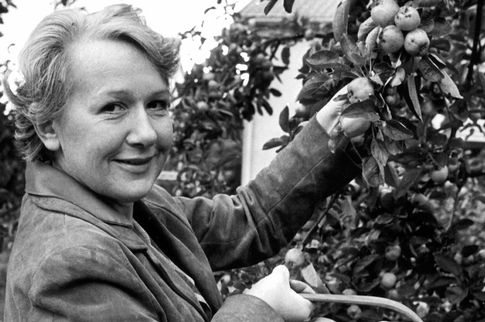
Sif Ruud won the first award in 1995 for her performances in Big Men, Little Men and Like It Never Was Before.

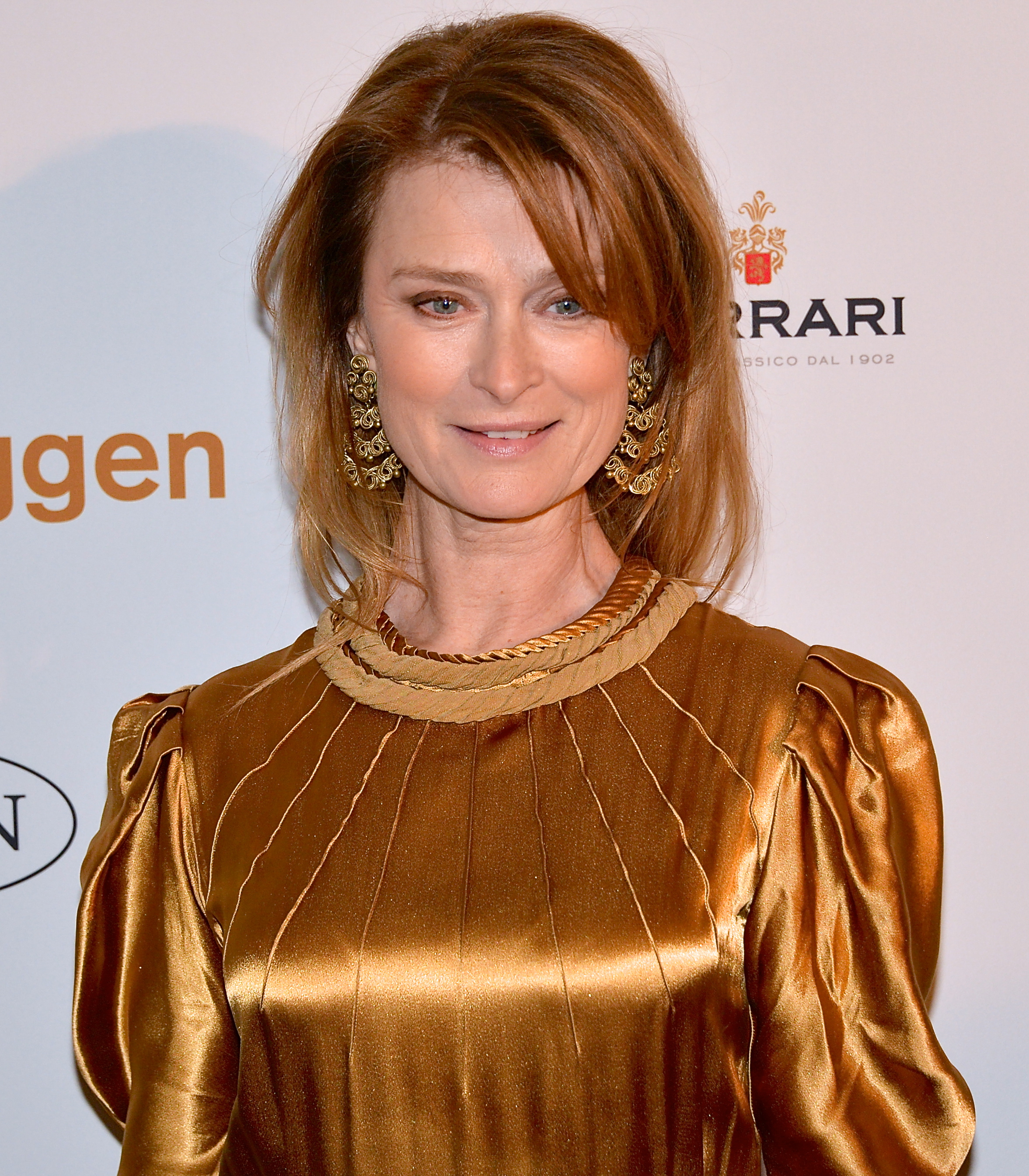
Lena Endre won two awards for her roles in 1996's Jerusalem, and 2020's My Father Marianne.

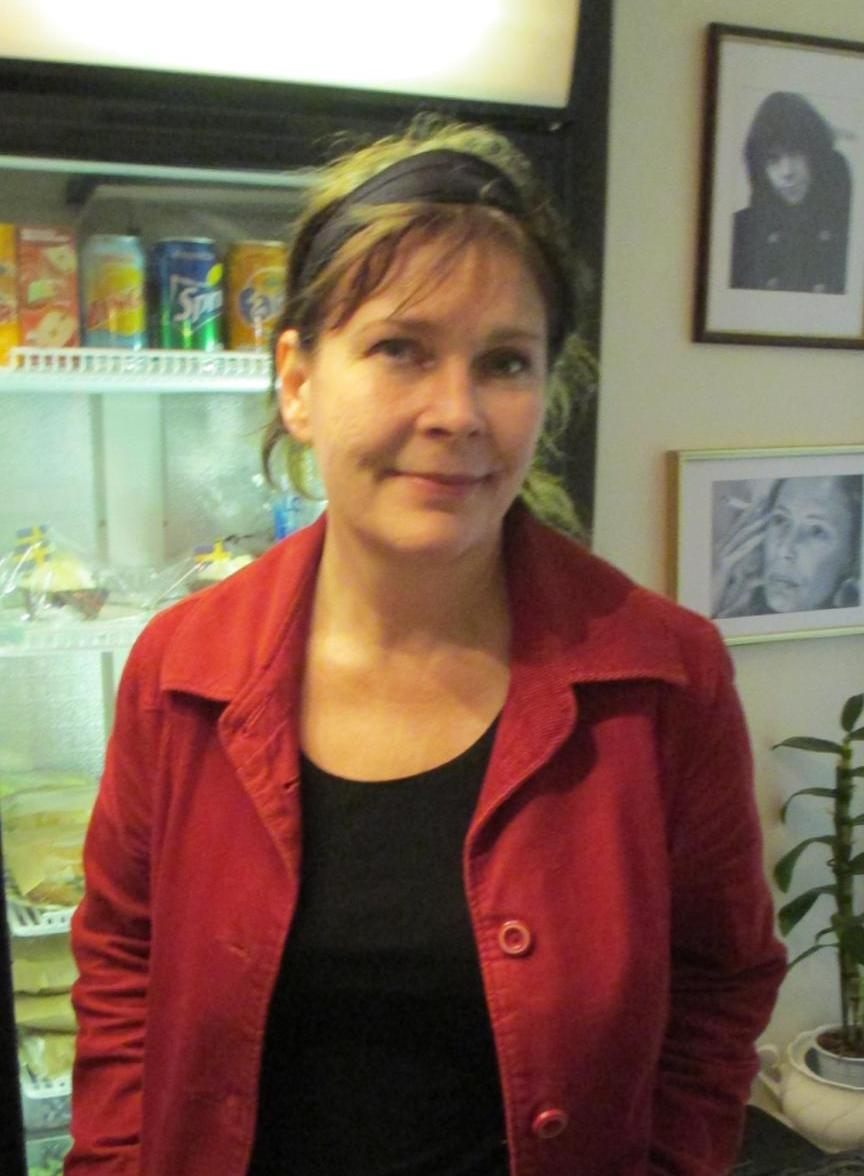
Tintin Anderzon won in 1997 for her performance in Adam & Eva.

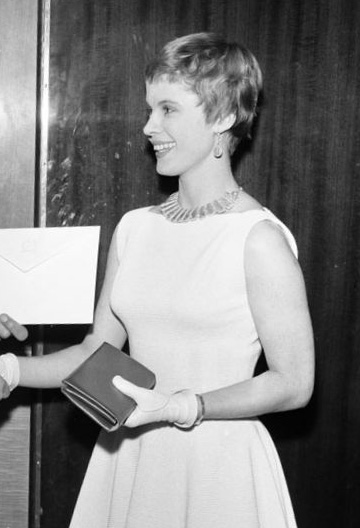
Bibi Andersson won three awards for her roles in 2000's Shit Happens, 2003's Elina: As If I Wasn't There, and 2007's Arn: The Knight Templar.

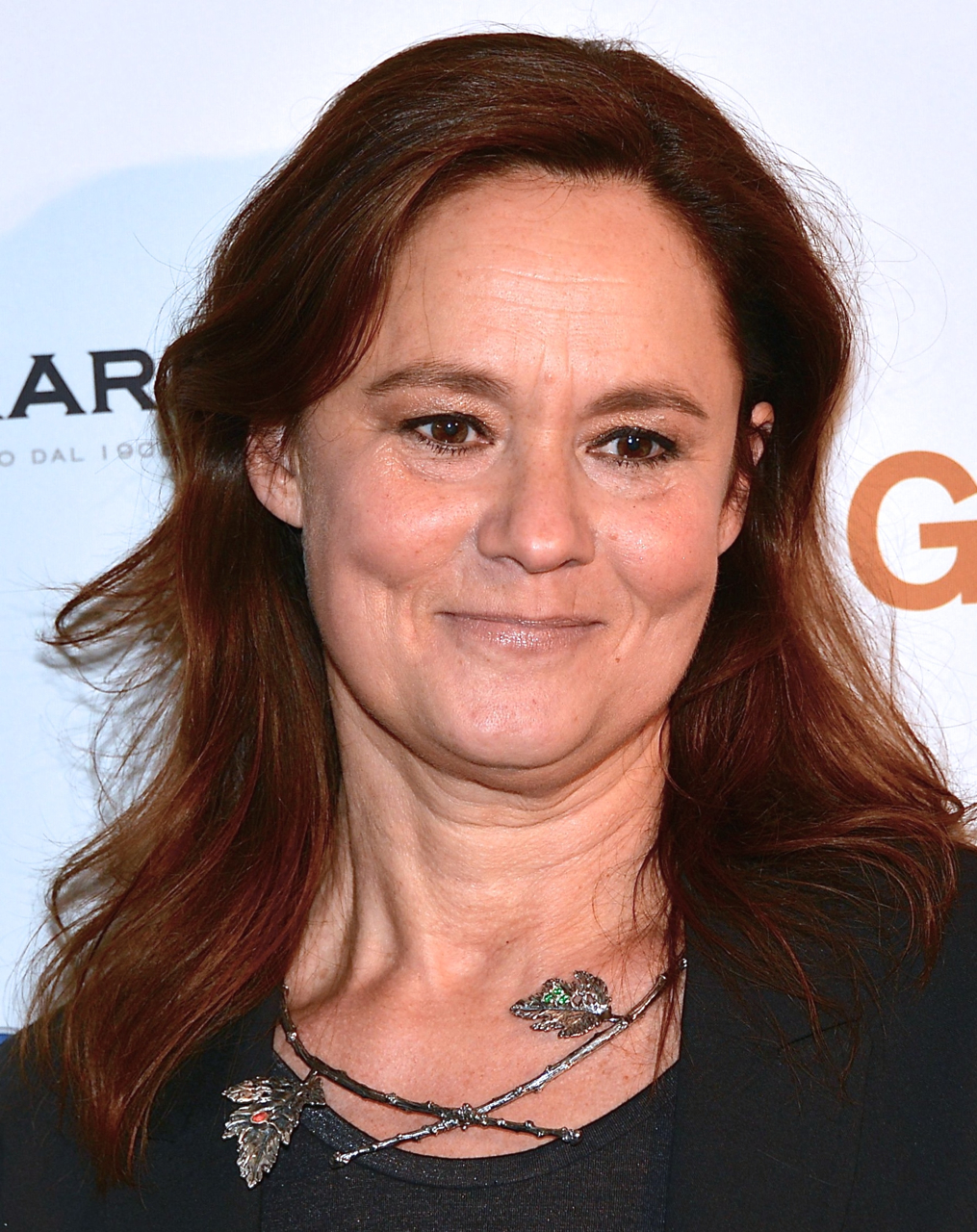
Pernilla August won in 1999 for her performance in Where the Rainbow Ends.

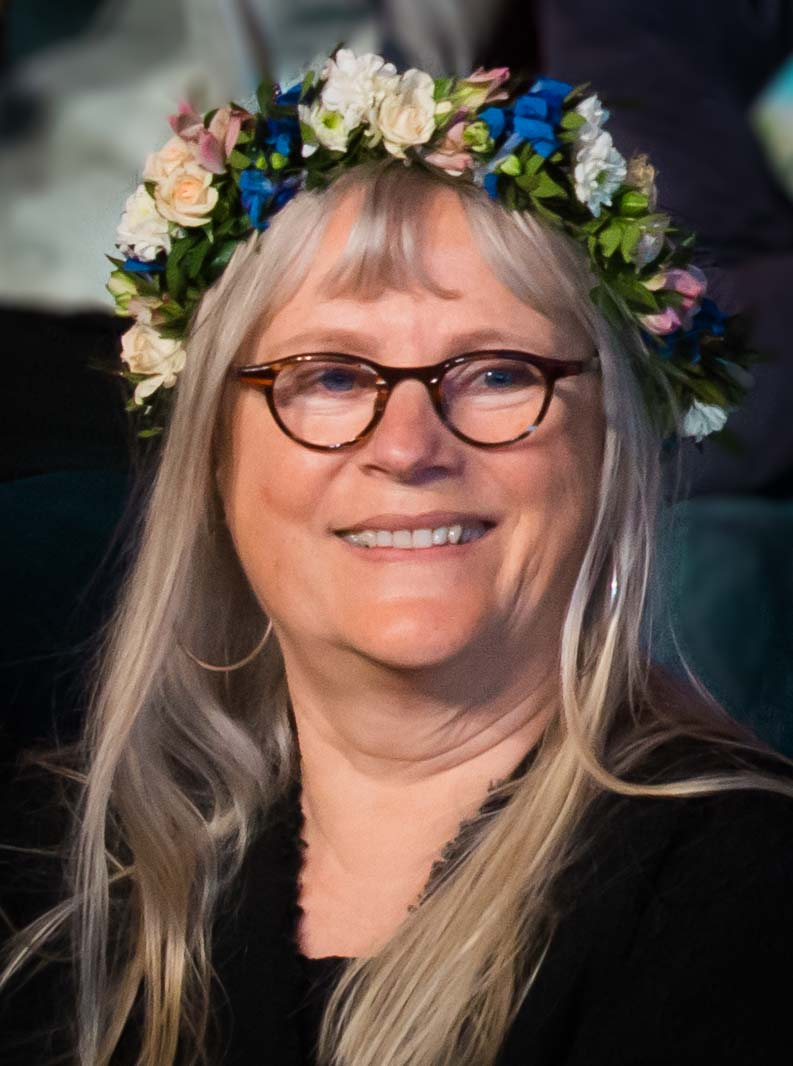
Ulla Skoog won in 2012 for her performance in The Last Sentence.

Year	Actress	Film	Role(s)	Ref.
1995 (31st)	Sif Ruud‡	Big Men, Little Men; Like It Never Was Before	Mrs. Alm; Evelyn	
1995 (31st)	Birgitta Andersson	Jönssonligans största kupp	Doris	
1995 (31st)	Frida Hallgren	30:e november	Sirka	
1996 (32nd)	Lena Endre‡	Jerusalem	Barbro	
1996 (32nd)	Viveka Seldahl	Christmas Oratorio	Fanny	
1996 (32nd)	Chatarina Larsson	Dad Is Tired Again	Mother	
1997 (33rd)	Tintin Anderzon‡	Adam & Eva	Tove	
1997 (33rd)	Gerd Hegnell	Rika barn leka bäst	Lilian	
1997 (33rd)	Lena Endre	Expectations	Margareta	
1998 (34th)	Maria Langhammer‡	Love Fools	Berit	
1998 (34th)	Lena Granhagen	Glasblåsarns barn	Flaxa Mildväder	
1998 (34th)	Lena B. Eriksson	Waiting for the Tenor	Cathrin	
1999 (35th)	Pernilla August‡	Where the Rainbow Ends	Tove	
1999 (35th)	Jessica Zandén	In Bed with Santa	Rita	
1999 (35th)	Källa Bie	Adult Behavior	Sofia	
2000 (36th)	Bibi Andersson‡	Shit Happens	Solveig	
2000 (36th)	Aminah Al Fakir	Wings of Glass	Mahin	
2000 (36th)	Cecilia Nilsson	Den bästa sommaren	Miss Svanström	
2001 (37th)	Carina Johansson‡	Days Like This	Lena	
2001 (37th)	Cecilia Frode	Syndare i sommarsol	Erna	
2001 (37th)	Maria Lundqvist	Deadline	Eva-Britt Qvist	
2002 (38th)	Cecilia Frode‡	Klassfesten	Lollo Edkvist	
2002 (38th)	Marie Göranzon	Everybody Loves Alice	Sonya	
2002 (38th)	Gunilla Röör	Beck – Sista vittnet	Lillemor "Limo" Fransson	
2003 (39th)	Bibi Andersson‡	Elina: As If I Wasn't There	Tora Holm	
2003 (39th)	Marie Richardson	Daybreak	Sofia	
2003 (39th)	Pernilla August	Daybreak	Agnes	
2004 (40th)	Kajsa Ernst‡	Dalecarlians	Eivor	
2004 (40th)	Ann Petrén	Dalecarlians	Gunilla	
2004 (40th)	Ingela Olsson	As It Is in Heaven	Inger	
2005 (41st)	Ghita Nørby‡	Four Weeks in June	Lilly	
2005 (41st)	Tuva Novotny	Bang Bang Orangutang	Linda	
2005 (41st)	Sofia Westberg	Mouth to Mouth	Vera	
2006 (42nd)	Lia Boysen‡	Search	Vera	
2006 (42nd)	Lena Endre	Göta kanal 2 – Kanalkampen	Vonna Jigert	
2006 (42nd)	Lena Nyman	Att göra en pudel	Edith	
2007 (43rd)	Bibi Andersson‡	Arn: The Knight Templar	Mother Rikissa	
2007 (43rd)	Maria Lundqvist	The New Man	Solbritt	
2007 (43rd)	Gunilla Nyroos	Nina Frisk	Jill	
2008 (44th)	Maria Lundqvist‡	Heaven's Heart	Ann	
2008 (44th)	Amanda Ooms	Everlasting Moments	Mathilda	
2008 (44th)	Marie Robertson	Rally Chicks	Birgitta	
2009 (45th)	Anki Lidén‡	Glowing Stars	Jenna's grandmother	
2009 (45th)	Tova Magnusson	The Girl	Anna	
2009 (45th)	Annika Hallin	Glowing Stars	Jenna's mother	
2010 (46th)	Outi Mäenpää‡	Beyond	Aili	
2010 (46th)	Cecilia Forss	Simple Simon	Jennifer	
2010 (46th)	Tehilla Blad	Beyond	Leena as a child	
2011 (47th)	Cecilia Nilsson‡	Simon and the Oaks	Inga	
2011 (47th)	Helena Bergström	Någon annanstans i Sverige	Anneli	
2011 (47th)	Liv Mjönes	With Every Heartbeat	Frida	
2012 (48th)	Ulla Skoog‡	The Last Sentence	Puste Segerstedt	
2012 (48th)	Leonore Ekstrand	Avalon	Jackie	
2012 (48th)	Yohanna Idha	Certain People	Linda	
2013 (49th)	Anna Bjelkerud‡	Hotell	Pernilla	
2013 (49th)	Mira Eklund	Hotell	Ann-Sofie	
2013 (49th)	Josefin Neldén	Shed No Tears	Lena	
2014 (50th)	Anita Wall‡	Home	Frida	
2014 (50th)	Fanni Metelius	Force Majeure	Fanni	
2014 (50th)	Ruth Vega Fernandez	Gentlemen	Maud	
2015 (51st)	Eva Melander‡	Flocking	Susanne	
2015 (51st)	Bahar Pars	A Man Called Ove	Parvaneh	
2015 (51st)	Amy Deasismont	My Skinny Sister	Katja	
2016 (52nd)	Sadžida Šetić‡	My Aunt in Sarajevo	Radmila	
2016 (52nd)	Liv Mjönes	A Serious Game	Dagmar Randel	
2016 (52nd)	Ia Langhammer	Flykten till framtiden	Mother	
2016 (52nd)	Svetlana Rodina Ljungkvist	The 101-Year Old Man Who Skipped Out on the Bill and Disappeared	Kristina	
2017 (53rd)	Julia Kijowska‡	Strawberry Days	Agnieszka	
2017 (53rd)	Gizem Erdogan	Beyond Dreams	Sarah	
2017 (53rd)	Maria Heiskanen	Ravens	Gärd	
2017 (53rd)	Mia Erika Sparrok	Sami Blood	Njenna	
2018 (54th)	Lena Nilsson‡	Videoman	Simone Karlsson	
2018 (54th)	Maria Bonnevie	Becoming Astrid	Hanna	
2018 (54th)	Trine Dyrholm	X & Y		
2018 (54th)	Sissela Benn	Sune vs Sune	Karin	
2019 (55th)	Bianca Cruzeiro‡	Aniara	Isagel	
2019 (55th)	Evin Ahmad	Ring mamma!	Hanna	
2019 (55th)	Alba August	The Perfect Patient	Jenny Küttim	
2019 (55th)	Sissela Benn	Sune – Best Man	Karin	
2020 (56th)	Lena Endre‡	My Father Marianne	Eva	
2020 (56th)	Marie Göranzon	Se upp för Jönssonligan	Margit Vanheden	
2020 (56th)	Eva Melander	Inland	Lena	
2020 (56th)	Marianne Mörck	Nelly Rapp Monster Agent	Lena-Sleva	
2021 (57th)	Jennie Silfverhjelm‡	Sagan om Karl-Bertil Johnsons julafton	Marianne	
2021 (57th)	Sofia Helin	Utvandrarna (2021 film)	Judit	
2021 (57th)	Liv Mjönes	Tigers	Karin	
2021 (57th)	Carla Sehn	Sagan om Karl-Bertil Johnsons julafton	Beata	
2022 (57th)	Dolly de Leon‡	Triangle of Sadness	Abigail	
2022 (57th)	Marika Lindström	Bränn alla mina brev	Karin Stolpe	
2022 (57th)	Liv Mjönes	Tack för senast	Ullis	
2022 (57th)	Carla Sehn	Stammisar	Stella	
2023 (58th)	Anja Lundqvist‡	Together 99	Lena	
2023 (58th)	Ia Langhammer	Thank You, I'm Sorry	Helen	
2023 (58th)	Jessica Liedberg	Together 99	Anna	
2023 (58th)	Jacqueline Ramel	Shame on Dry Land	Kicki	
2024 (59th)	Eva Melander‡	Trouble	Helena	
2024 (59th)	Lisa Carlehed	The Swedish Torpedo	Carla	
2024 (59th)	Andrea Edwards	The Hypnosis	Lotta	
2024 (59th)	Liv Mjönes	Så länge hjärtat slår	Katrin	

== See also ==
- Academy Award for Best Supporting Actress
- BAFTA Award for Best Actress in a Supporting Role
- Golden Globe Award for Best Supporting Actress – Motion Picture
- Broadcast Film Critics Association Award for Best Supporting Actress
- Screen Actors Guild Award for Outstanding Performance by a Female Actor in a Supporting Role
