= Quisling (disambiguation) =

Quisling is a term meaning "traitor". Quisling may also refer to

- Vidkun Quisling, 20th century Norwegian politician and traitor

- Maria Quisling, Vidkun Quisling's wife
- Quisling residence Villa Grande, Vidkun Quisling's former home
- Quisling regime, the Nazi-controlled puppet government of Norway in World War II
- Quisling: The Final Days, a 2024 historical drama film by Erik Poppe

- Erik Quisling (born 1971), American author, musician, filmmaker and entrepreneur
- Quisling Towers Apartments in Madison, Wisconsin, USA
