= Lisa Carlehed =

Swedish actress (born 1979)

- Born: 15 July 1979 (age 47); Gothenburg, Sweden
- Occupation: Actress
- Spouse: Nicolei Faber
- Children: 2
- Father: Ingemar Carlehed

Lisa Carlehed (born 15 July 1979) is a Swedish actress. Starting her career in Denmark, she made her breakthrough in Swedish film with The Emigrants (2021), earning a Guldbagge Award nomination. She has also been nominated for The Swedish Torpedo (2024) and appeared in the Palme d'Or winner Fjord (2026).

== Early life ==
Carlehed was born in Gothenburg to teacher Ninni Bergström Swartz and actor and director Ingemar Carlehed. She moved to Karlstad with her mother at age six when her parents separated. She aspired to act from an early age and studied journalism at Tingvalla secondary school. In 2001, she began studying acting at GITIS Scandinavia in Aarhus, the newly founded Danish branch of the Russian Institute of Theatre Arts (GITIS).

== Career ==
Carlehed's early career mainly comprised art films in Denmark. In 2015, she played the lead role of Maria, a nurse whose patient wants to end his life, in Samanou Acheche Sahlstrøm's drama In Your Arms, which won the top prize at the Gothenburg Film Festival. In 2018, she reunited with Sahlstrøm for his next film, Until We Fall, opposite Dar Salim. This earned her a Bodil Award nomination for Best Actress in a Leading Role.

In 2021, Carlehed appeared in her first major film production in her home country of Sweden: The Emigrants, Erik Poppe's adaptation of the stories by Vilhelm Moberg. She played the lead role of Kristina opposite Gustaf Skarsgård as Karl Oskar – taking over the roles from Liv Ullmann and Max von Sydow in the original adaptation of 50 years past. She was recognized for her breakthrough role with a Guldbagge Award nomination for Best Actress in a Leading Role. She following this up with another Swedish film in 2022, starring in Moa Gammel's romantic comedy R.S.V.P. (Tack för senast), her first comedy after a career in dramas.

In 2024, Carlehed reunited with Poppe for his Norwegian historical drama Quisling: The Final Days, where she played the title figure's wife, Maria. The same year, she played the sister of Swedish swimmer Sally Bauer in Frida Kempff's sports drama The Swedish Torpedo. This supporting role earned Carlehed her second Guldbagge Award nomination. In 2026, she played the supporting role of Mia in the Norwegian-set drama Fjord, written and directed by Cristian Mungiu, which won the Palme d'Or at the Cannes Film Festival.

== Personal life ==
Carlehed met her husband, Nicolei Faber, in acting school. They have two children.

== Filmography ==
=== Film ===
Year	Title	Role
2013	Hotel	Emma
2015	In Your Arms	Maria
2017	Letters for Amina	Astrid
2018	Until We Fall	Louise
2019	Psychosia	Viktoria
2019	The Tunnel	Ingrid
2020	Into the Darkness	Britta
2021	The Marco Effect	Mona
2021	The Emigrants	Kristina
2022	Out of the Darkness	Britta
2022	R.S.V.P.	Klara
2023	Munch	August Strindberg
2024	Boundless	Mona
2024	Quisling: The Final Days	Maria Quisling
2024	The Swedish Torpedo	Carla
2026	After the Darkness	Britta
2026	Fjord	Mia

=== Television ===
Year	Title	Role	Notes
2016	Follow the Money	Lise Strand	2 episodes
2018	The Rain	Doctor	Episode: "Trust No One"
2018	Tæt på sandheden	Carola Säländer	4 episodes
2022	Baby Fever	Lene	Episode: "The One That Got Away"
2022	The Shift	Camilla	Episode: "April"
2024	Sthlm Blackout	Maj	3 episodes
2024	Quisling	Maria Quisling	Main role; 5 episodes

== Awards and nominations ==
Organizations	Year	Category	Work	Result	Ref.
Bodil Awards	2020	Best Actress in a Leading Role	Until We Fall	Nominated	
Guldbagge Awards	2022	Best Actress in a Leading Role	The Emigrants	Nominated	
Guldbagge Awards	2025	Best Actress in a Supporting Role	The Swedish Torpedo	Nominated	
Gullruten	2025	Best Supporting Actor – Drama	Quisling	Nominated	
