= Momento Film =

Swedish production company

Momento Film

Momento Film is a production company based in Stockholm, Sweden. The company was founded by producer and director David Herdies to make documentaries and fiction films.

== Productions ==
Productions include full-length films and shorts:

- 2024 - Madame Luna
- 2024 - Leaving Jesus
- 2022 - Dogborn
- 2022 - All of our Heartbeats are Connected Through Exploding Stars
- 2021 - Bellum – The Daemon of War
- 2020 - Yung Lean: In My Head
- 2020 - Tiny Tim: King for a Day
- 2019 - Buddha in Africa (documentary)
- 2019 - Transnistra (documentary)
- 2018 - Hamada (documentary)
- 2018 - Memory Games (co-production)
- 2018 - Jauria (short)
- 2018 - Horizon (co-production)
- 2018 - My Heart Belongs to Daddy (documentary)
- 2017 - Ouaga Girls (documentary)
- 2017 - Lida (documentary)
- 2016 - Miles of Sand (short)
- 2016 - What Remains (short)
- 2016 - Rust (short)
- 2016 - Dear Kid (short)
- 2016 - Circles (short)
- 2016 - Yellow Brick Road (short)
- 2016 - Madre (short)
- 2016 - Fragility
- 2015 - The Dybbuk. A Tale of Wandering Souls
- 2015 - Winter Buoy
- 2015 - Ghost Rockets
- 2014 - sv:Att skiljas (A Separation)
- 2013 - While No One Is Watching
- 2012 - Give Us the Money
- 2011 - sv:Gerillasonen (The Guerilla Son)
- 2011 - Scenes of Violence
