= 59th Guldbagge Awards =

2024 Swedish film awards

- Date: 15 January 2024
- Site: Cirkus, Stockholm
- Hosted by: Shima Niavarani

Highlights
- Best Picture: Paradise Is Burning
- Most awards: Shame on Dry Land (7)
- Most nominations: Shame on Dry Land (9)

Television coverage
- Network: SVT

The 59th Guldbagge Awards ceremony, presented by the Swedish Film Institute, honoring the best Swedish films of 2023 took place on 15 January 2024 at Cirkus in Stockholm, Sweden. The ceremony was televised by SVT and hosted by actress and singer Shima Niavarani.

Drama film Paradise Is Burning won the Best Film, while Shame on Dry Land garnered the most awards with seven.

== Winners and nominees ==
The nominations were announced on 13 December 2023. Drama film Shame on Dry Land led the nominations with nine, followed by Hammarskjöld and Opponent with seven.

Winners are listed first, highlighted in boldface, and indicated with a double dagger (‡).

**Best Film**: **Paradise Is Burning – Nima Yousefi**‡; 100 Seasons – Daniel Oliva Andersson and Isabella Rodriguez; The Gullspång Miracle – Ina Holmqvist; Hammarskjöld – Patrick Ryborn; Opponent – Annika Rogell	**Best Director**: **Axel Petersén – Shame on Dry Land**‡; Milad Alami – Opponent; Maria Fredriksson – The Gullspång Miracle; Ami-Ro Sköld – The Store
**Best Actress in a Leading Role**: **Marall Nasiri – Opponent as Maryam**‡; Karin Franz Körlof – One Day All This Will Be Yours as Lisa; Lena Olin – Second Act as Eva; Sanna Sundqvist – Thank You, I'm Sorry as Sara	**Best Actor in a Leading Role**: **Joel Spira – Shame on Dry Land as Dimman**‡; Gustaf Hammarsten – Together 99 as Göran; Mikael Persbrandt – Hammarskjöld as Dag Hammarskjöld; Payman Maadi – Opponent as Iman
**Best Actress in a Supporting Role**: **Anja Lundqvist – Together 99 as Lena**‡; Ia Langhammer – Thank You, I'm Sorry as Helen; Jacqueline Ramel – Shame on Dry Land as Kicki; Jessica Liedberg – Together 99 as Anna	**Best Actor in a Supporting Role**: **Christopher Wagelin – Shame on Dry Land as Fredrik**‡; Henrik Norlén – Dogborn as Yann; Johan Ulveson – The Final Race as Blomman; Peter Haber – One Day All This Will Be Yours as Pappa
**Best Screenplay**: **Together 99 – Lukas Moodysson**‡; Exodus – Abbe Hassan and Kristoffer Cras; Opponent – Milad Alami; Shame on Dry Land – Axel Petersén	**Best Cinematography**: **Shame on Dry Land – Josua Enblom**‡; Hammarskjöld – John Christian Rosenlund; Opponent – Sebastian Winterø
**Best Editing**: **Shame on Dry Land – Robert Krantz**‡; The Gullspång Miracle – Mark Bukdahl and Orvar Anklew; Opponent – Olivia Neergaard-Holm	**Best Costume Design**: **Hammarskjöld – Karen Fabritius Gram and Pierre Vienings**‡; Dogborn – Sanna Nyström; The Sugar Experiment – Anne-Louise Thornblad
**Best Sound Design**: **Shame on Dry Land – Andreas Franck**‡; Forever – Jonathan Dakers; Hammarskjöld – Hans Møller	**Best Makeup and Hair**: **The Conference – Tove Jansson, Eva von Bahr, and Love Larson**‡; Dogborn – Erika Nicklasson; Paradise Is Burning – Kaisa Pätilä
**Best Original Score**: **Shame on Dry Land – Baba Stiltz**‡; Exodus – Lisa Montan; Who Are You, Mamma Moo? – Henrik Lörstad	**Best Set Design**: **Paradise Is Burning – Catharina Nyqvist Ehrnrooth**‡; Dogborn – Elle Furudahl; Hammarskjöld – Niels Sejer
**Best Visual Effects**: **The Abyss – Nora Berecoechea and Stefan Rycken**‡; The Conference – Alan Banis and Andreas Hylander; Hammarskjöld – Jacob Otterström and Torbjörn Olsson	**Best Documentary Feature**: **The Gullspång Miracle – Maria Fredriksson**‡; Hypermoon – Mia Engberg; Son of the Mullah – Nahid Persson Sarvestani; Vintersaga – Carl Olsson
**Best Short Film**: **Leila – Fariba Haidari**‡; The Lovers – Carolina Sandvik; Madden – Malin Ingrid Johansson	**Audience Award**: **Beck - Inferno – Francy Suntinger**
**Honorary Award**: **Marie Göranzon**	**Gullspiran**: **Inger Nilsson**

== Films with multiple nominations and awards ==
Films with multiple nominations
Nominations	Film
9	Shame on Dry Land
7	Hammarskjöld
7	Opponent
4	Dogborn
4	The Gullspång Miracle
4	Together 99
3	Paradise Is Burning
2	The Conference
2	Exodus
2	One Day All This Will Be Yours
2	Thank You, I'm Sorry

Films with multiple awards
Nominations	Film
7	Shame on Dry Land
2	Paradise Is Burning
2	Together 99
