= David Herdies =

Swedish film producer and director

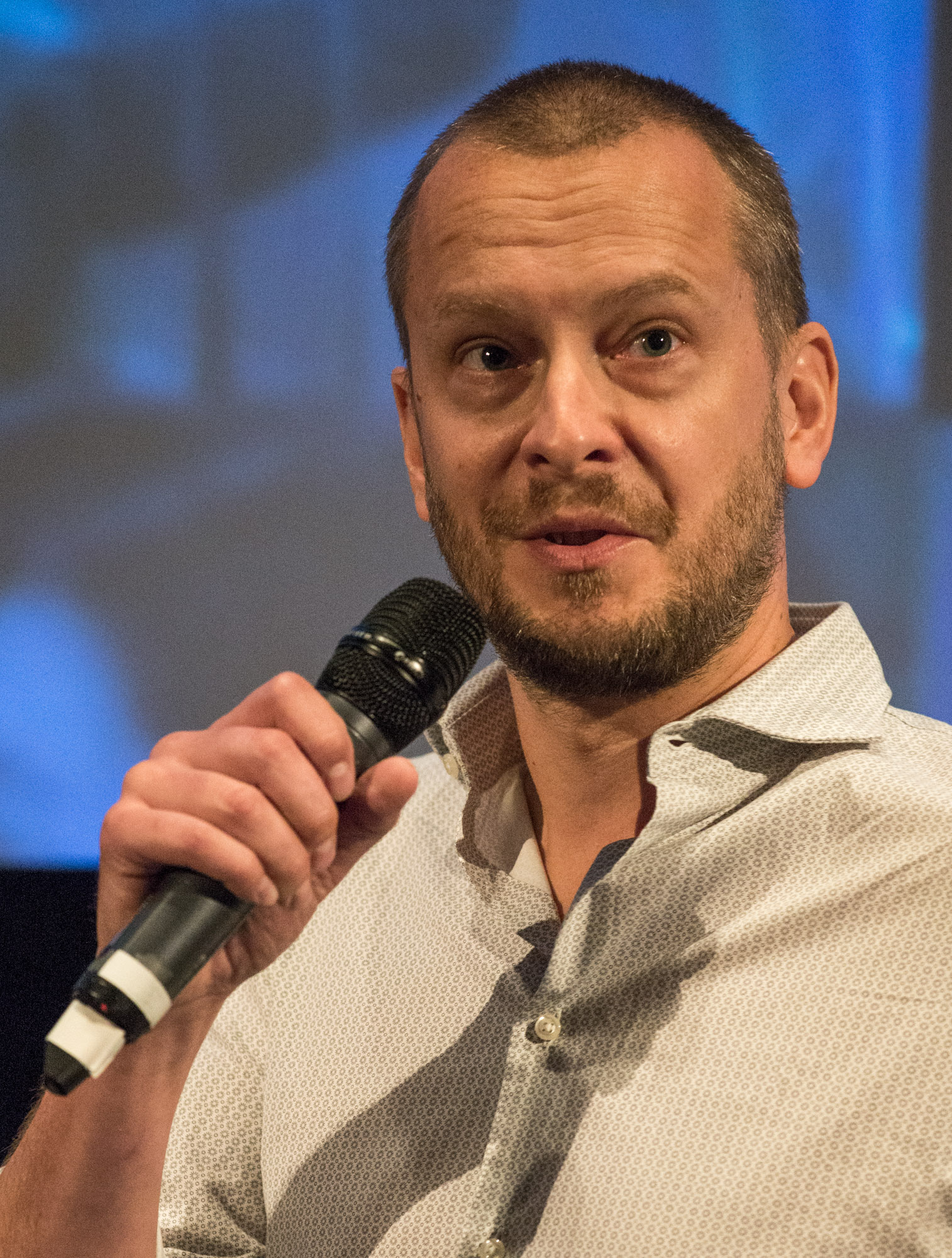
- Born: June 23, 1974 (age 51); Skärholmen, Stockholm, Sweden
- Occupation(s): Producer, director
- Website: momentofilm.se/profiles/david-herdies

David Herdies is a Swedish producer, director and the CEO of Momento Film.

Herdies, born David Olivier Knape, lives and works in Stockholm. In 2006, he started the film production company Filmfront STHLM together with Georg Götmark, where he directed and produced documentaries such as Citizen Oketch (2009) and The Guerilla Son (2011).

In 2011, Herdies started the production company Momento Film. His films include Ouaga Girls by Theresa Traore Dahlberg (2017), the short film Madre by Simón Mesa Soto (Official Short Film Competition, Cannes 2016), Fragility by Ahang Bashi (Gothenburg Best Feature, Guldbagge for Best Newcomer, 2017) and Winter Buoy by Frida Kempff (Best International Documentary NIFF, 2015).

== Filmography ==
- Dogborn (2022)
- Ouaga Girls Directed by Theresa Traore Dahlberg, produced by David Herdies (2017)
- Fragility Directed by Ahang Bashi, produced by David Herdies (2016)
- Madre Directed by Simon Mesa Soto produced by David Herdies (2016)
- Dear Kid Directed by Frida Kempff, produced by David Herdies (2016)
- Miles of Sand Directed by Sonejuhi Sinha, produced by David Herdies (2016)
- Winter Buoy Directed by Frida Kempff, produced by David Herdies (2015)
- Att skiljas Directed by Karin Ekberg, produced by David Herdies (2014)
- While no one is watching Directed by David Herdies and Ulla Lemberg (2013)
- Give Us The Money Directed by Bosse Lindquist, produced by David Herdies (2012)
- sv:Gerillasonen (The Guerilla Son) Directed by David Herdies and sv:Zanyar Adami (2012)
- Fardosa Directed and produced by David Herdies (2010)
- Citizen Oketch Directed by David Herdies and Georg Götmark (2009)

== Awards ==
Year	Result	Festival	Film
2016	Nomination	Cannes Film Festival	Madre
2015	Nomination	Gothenburg International Film Festival	Winter Buoy
2014	Best Nordic Documentary	Nordic Docs (Norway)	A Separation
2013	Peabody Award	Peabody Awards	Give Us The Money
2013	Honorary Mention	Nordisk Panorama	The Guerilla Son
2012	Nominated	Prix Europe	The Guerilla Son
