= Martin Bengtsson =

Martin Bengtsson may refer to:

- Martin Bengtsson (musician) (born 1974), Swedish musician
- Martin Bengtsson (footballer) (born 1986), Swedish footballer
