= Mustapha Aarab =

Moroccan actor (born 2000)

- Born: 19 January 2004 (age 22); Agadir, Morocco
- Occupation: Actor
- Years active: 2019–present
- Notable work: JJ+E

Mustapha Aarab (born 19 January 2004) is a Moroccan-Swedish actor.

== Early life ==
Aarab was born in the city of Agadir, Morocco, and moved to Sweden with his mother at the age of 17, where he began acting.

== Career ==
He debuted as Zack in the series Beartown (2020). He was chosen for the role in part due to his familiarity with the Arabic language.

In 2021, Aarab played John-John in the Netflix romantic drama JJ+E. He was one of four candidates nominated for the Swedish Film Institute's best male actor award for his role in the film.

He had a supporting role as Samir in Forever (2023). He played Liam in the 2025 series Alla andra kan dra åt helvete.
