= Shame on Dry Land =

2023 drama film

- Promotional release poster
- Swedish: Syndabocken
- Directed by: Axel Petersén
- Written by: Axel Petersén
- Produced by: Sigrid Helleday
- Starring: Joel Spira; Christopher Wagelin; Julia Sporre
- Cinematography: Josua Enblom
- Edited by: Robert Krantz
- Music by: Baba Stiltz
- Production company: Fedra AB
- Distributed by: Triart Film; LevelK
- Release dates: 11 September 2023 (Toronto); 24 November 2023 (Sweden)
- Running time: 91 minutes
- Countries: Sweden; Malta
- Language: Swedish

Shame on Dry Land (Swedish: Syndabocken, lit. 'The scapegoat') is a 2023 drama film directed and written by Axel Petersén. It stars Joel Spira, Christopher Wagelin, and Julia Sporre. The film had its world premiere at the 2023 Toronto International Film Festival on 11 September 2023. It garnered nine nominations at the 59th Guldbagge Awards, including Best Director for Petersén and Best Actor in a Leading Role for Spira.

== Premise ==
A con man, Dimman, leaves for Malta to surprise a friend at their wedding, but becomes entangled in a large Swedish online gambling community.

== Cast ==
- Joel Spira as Dimman
- Christopher Wagelin as Fredrik
- Julia Sporre as Sara
- Jacqueline Ramel as Kicki
- Michal Axel Piotrowski as Krumm
- Tommy Nilsson as Pierre
- Erica Muscat as Karmena
- Owen Sciriha as Nima
- Susanne Barklund as Mia

== Production ==
In 2019, the project was announced to participate at the Berlinale Co-Production Market, under the working title From Malta to Oblivion. In August 2022, it was announced that LevelK would handle the film's international sales. The principal photography took place entirely in Malta in 2022.

== Release ==
Shame on Dry Land had its world premiere at the 2023 Toronto International Film Festival on 11 September, competing for the Platform Prize. The film was released in Swedish cinema on 24 November 2023.

== Reception ==
Kurt Halfyard of Screen Anarchy gave the film a positive review, calling it "that rare bird of sensual fusion of commercial Hollywood and European arthouse sensibilities". Elena Lazic of Cineuropa praised its "frenetic visual style" and exploration of Dimman's psychological makeup, writing that it " calls back to 1970s neo-noir American films".

== Accolades ==
Shame on Dry Land led the nominations of 59th Guldbagge Awards with nine.

Award	Date	Category	Recipient	Result	Ref.
Toronto International Film Festival	7–17 September 2023	Platform Prize	Axel Petersén	Nominated	
Guldbagge Awards	15 January 2024	Best Director	Axel Petersén	Won	
Guldbagge Awards	15 January 2024	Best Actor in a Leading Role	Joel Spira	Won	
Guldbagge Awards	15 January 2024	Best Actor in a Supporting Role	Christopher Wagelin	Won	
Guldbagge Awards	15 January 2024	Best Actress in a Supporting Role	Jacqueline Ramel	Nominated	
Guldbagge Awards	15 January 2024	Best Screenplay	Axel Petersén	Nominated	
Guldbagge Awards	15 January 2024	Best Cinematography	Josua Emblom	Won	
Guldbagge Awards	15 January 2024	Best Editing	Robert Krantz	Won	
Guldbagge Awards	15 January 2024	Best Sound Design	Andreas Franck	Won	
Guldbagge Awards	15 January 2024	Best Original Score	Baba Stiltz	Won	
