= IK Sturehov =

Swedish football club

- Full name: Idrottsklubben Sturehov
- Ground: Sörbyvallen, Örebro

IK Sturehov is a Swedish football club located in Örebro.

== Background ==
The club was founded in 1935 as IK Sture. It has earlier played bandy, ice hockey, and table tennis, but is now only active in football. Martin Bengtsson represented the club before signing with the Allsvenskan club Örebro SK in 2002.

IK Sturehov currently plays in Division 4 Örebro which is the sixth tier of Swedish football. They play their home matches at Sörbyvallen in Örebro.

The club is affiliated to Örebro Läns Fotbollförbund.

== See also ==
- Category:IK Sturehov players
