= Alexis Almström =

Swedish director and screenwriter

- Born: Alexis Almström; 25 February 1985 (age 40); Stockholm, Sweden
- Occupation(s): Director, screenwriter
- Years active: 2015–present
- Notable work: JJ+E (2021); Top dog (2020)

Alexis Almström is a Swedish director screenwriter and musician.

Almström was born in Stockholm. Before he became a movie maker he was a celebrated musician and rapper under the artist name Alexis Weak. He was nominated for a Swedish grammy in 2012 and his debut album won the title "album of the year" in Swedish pop culture magazine Nöjesguiden. Soon after he released his first album he shifted his focus to movies and TV. He has a BA in film directing from the Swedish Institute of Dramatic Art in Stockholm and graduated 2015.

In 2015, he worked on the prizewinning short film Mazda, before making his feature film debut with Pink cloud syndrome in 2018.

His first TV-series is based on the acclaimed novel "Top dog" by Jens Lapidus and the series was nominated for "Best series" in Cannes Series 2020.

After that he went on to direct his second feature film JJ+E and the movie was nominated for three Guldbaggen awards (Swedish oscars) and went on to win best male actor in a supporting role for debutant actor Jonay Pineda skallak

In 2022 Alexis headed back to direct the second critically acclaimed season of top dog.

He is married to Swedish actress Hedda Stiernstedt

== Filmography ==
Year	English title	Original title	Type	
2015	Mazda		Mazda	Short
2018	Pink cloud syndrome		Rosa moln	feature
2021	JJ+E		Vinterviken	feature
2020-2023	Top Dog		Top Dog	TV-drama
