= Madre (film) =

- Film poster
- Directed by: Simón Mesa Soto
- Written by: Simón Mesa Soto
- Produced by: David Herdies
- Cinematography: Juan Sarmiento G.
- Edited by: Gustavo Vasco
- Distributed by: Momento Film
- Release date: May 18, 2016 (Cannes Film Festival)
- Running time: 14 minutes
- Countries: Colombia; Sweden
- Language: Spanish

Madre is a 2016 Colombian short drama film directed by Simón Mesa Soto. It is one of four short films created as part of a Swedish-financed international film project titled "Break the Silence" which examines sexualized violence against children. It premiered at the 2016 Cannes Film Festival as one of the entries in the Short Film Palme d'Or competition. Later that year it won the prize of Best Fiction Short Film at Havana Film Festival, it was a nominee for Best Short Film at Dokufest, it won a Gold Hugo at Chicago Film Festival, it was nominated for Live Action Short Film at AFI Fest and it was nominated for Best Fiction Short Film at Guanajuato International Film Festival. 2017 was a successful year too for the film since it won the awards Best Fiction Short Film and Best Actress at Bogotá Film Festival and was nominated for Best Short Film at Premios Macondo.

== Synopsis ==
16-year-old Andrea leaves her neighborhood in the hills of Medellin to attend a downtown casting call for a porno film.

== Cast ==
- Yurani Anduquia Cortes
- Paulo De Jesús Barros Sousa
- María Camila Maldonado

== See also ==
- Short Film Palme d'Or
