= While No One Is Watching (2013 film) =

- Film poster
- Swedish: När ingen ser
- Directed by: Ulla Lemberg; David Herdies
- Produced by: David Herdies
- Cinematography: Camilla Skagerström
- Edited by: Erik Andersson; Robert Nordh
- Music by: Krister Linder
- Production company: Momento Film in cooperation with ECPAT Sweden
- Release date: 2 October 2013
- Running time: 58 minutes
- Country: Sweden
- Languages: English; Swedish; Khmer; Rumanian; Swahili; Arabic

While No One Is Watching is a 2013 Swedish documentary film about sexual violence against children and the people fighting to stop it, directed by Ulla Lemberg and David Herdies. The film is produced by Momento Film in a cooperation with ECPAT Sweden.

In October 2013, the film was screened privately for politicians and government officials, followed by a panel discussion led by Swedish Minister of Foreign Affairs, Margot Wallström. The cinematography is by Camilla Skagerström.
