= The Gullspång Miracle =

- Norwegian theatrical release poster
- Norwegian: Mirakelet i Gullspång
- Swedish: Miraklet i Gullspång
- Directed by: Maria Fredriksson
- Written by: Maria Fredriksson
- Produced by: Ina Holmqvist
- Cinematography: Pia Lehto
- Edited by: Orvar Anklew; Mark Bukdahl
- Music by: Jonas Colstrup
- Production companies: Ballad Film; Good Company Pictures; Mer Film; SVT; Film i Väst & Film Stockholm
- Release dates: 11 June 2023 (Tribeca Film Festival); 27 October 2023 (Sweden)
- Running time: 109 minutes
- Countries: Norway; Sweden; Denmark
- Languages: Swedish; Norwegian
- Box office: US$415,576

The Gullspång Miracle (Norwegian: Mirakelet i Gullspång; Swedish: Miraklet i Gullspång) is a 2023 mystery documentary film directed by Maria Fredriksson in her directorial debut. It follows two sisters in Gullspång, Sweden who encounter a woman resembling their long-deceased sister, leading to the unfolding of family secrets and a potential murder mystery.

A co-production between Sweden, Norway, and Denmark, The Gullspång Miracle premiered at the 2023 Tribeca Film Festival and screened at numerous other international film festivals. It was released theatrically in Sweden on 27 October 2023. The film received largely favorable reviews from critics, and was nominated for four Guldbagge Awards, winning the award for Best Documentary Feature.

== Plot ==
May, a pious older woman from northern Norway, visits her sister Kari in Gullspång, Sweden. After being injured on an amusement park ride, May chooses to take an extended stay in Gullspång to convalesce. She decides to rent an apartment and begins touring available units. In one, she observes three paintings of fruit hanging in the kitchen, a decorative feature she had envisioned herself. She interprets this as a divine sign and chooses to rent the apartment. May and Kari are shocked when they meet the seller, Olaug, who bears a striking resemblance to their elder sister Astrid "Lita", who purportedly died by suicide in 1988 after being involved in an embezzlement scheme. They are further surprised when they learn that Olaug shares the same birthdate as Lita – 9 February 1941 – and also went by the same nickname in her youth.

After questioning family members, May and Kari are told that Lita was in fact a twin, who was separated from her sister at birth out of fear that the Nazis, who were occupying Norway during World War II, might steal them to be used in medical experiments. Olaug learns through a DNA test that she is apparently the sisters' half-sibling, and travels to meet her half-brother Jan and his family at their ancestral farm. Olaug, an intellectual who once held high rank in the Swedish Armed Forces, soon finds herself at odds with her newfound family members who are deeply religious, and outspokenly regards them as unsophisticated.

May and Kari learn through local police and medical records that Lita apparently died of heart failure on a lakeside in the country, and did not die by suicide there as they had been told. This news relieves them both due to their Christian views on suicide. Discord begins to erupt between May, Kari, and Olaug, which is exacerbated when Olaug suggests that she believes, based on the police reports and her own military expertise, that Lita was murdered. Feeling a deep disconnect toward the family, Olaug suggests that the three, along with Lita's daughter Trine, undergo a second DNA test. The results disprove the previous test, showing that Olaug is not a blood relative of May or Kari, and that the likelihood of her being Trine's biological aunt is 0.02%. The documentary's director, Maria, vocalizes her confusion and distrust of the three women's conflicting claims.

The revelation of the second DNA test upsets May and Kari, who have come to agree that Lita may have actually been a murder victim based on conflicting eyewitness reports, an ominous conversation she had with Kari shortly before her death, and the fact that Lita had taken out three life insurance policies shortly before she died (one of which was issued through the employer of her partner Steiner, from whom she had recently separated). Trine continues to believe that Olaug is in fact her aunt; May and Kari suspect that Olaug tampered with her blood test in order to cut ties with the family.

The film concludes with May finally deciding to vacate the apartment she leased in Gullspång. She and Kari ponder the paintings of the fruit in the kitchen before removing them both.

== Cast ==
- Olaug Bakkevoll
- May-Elin Storsletten
- Kari Klo
- Pauline Dahl
- Jan Fjelltun
- Trine Prestsveen Gaustad
- Berit Hauger
- Kjell Hauger
- Arnt-Hugo Johnsen
- Roger Johnsen
- Anne-Grethe Larsen
- Pether Nyberg
- Solveig Pedersen
- Steinar Stenersen

== Release ==
The Gullspång Miracle premiered at the Tribeca Film Festival in New York City on 11 June 2023. It was also screened at the Sheffield DocFest in England, as well as the Palm Springs International Film Festival, Tromsø International Film Festival, and Visions du Réel. It was released theatrically in Sweden on 27 October 2023.

=== Home media ===
Film Movement released the film digitally on 2 May 2025. In August 2025, Film Movement released a limited edition Blu-ray of the film in North America, made available through Vinegar Syndrome's online web store.

== Reception ==
=== Box office ===
The film grossed $415,576 worldwide.

=== Critical response ===
On the review aggregator website Rotten Tomatoes, 95% of 22 critics' reviews are positive.

Lynn Venhaus of the Alliance of Women Film Journalists awarded the film a favorable review, noting: "Twists and turns abound, and the director isn’t a silent participant as she films. Exasperated, she wonders if everything she hears is to be believed. You decide. But this is a stunning true-life tale that becomes a wild rollercoaster ride, or a crazy plastic whale down a water slide. You can’t look away." Diego Semerene of Slant Magazine awarded the film three and a half out of four stars, writing that it "steers clear of the feel-good vibes pedalled by the genealogy series Who Do You Think You Are?, suggesting that the telling of any family history is more fantasy than facticity. The various twists of the sisters’ story places the documentary in kinship with Sarah Polley’s Stories We Tell, for the way it teaches us that identity writ large relies on a series of fragile misrecognitions that cinema can only hope to expose and complicate, not resolve." Matt Zoller Seitz of RogerEbert.com wrote: "Viewers who’ve seen a lot of documentaries will immediately guess the central revelation, and director Fredriksson knows this and has the good taste not to withhold the obvious to manufacture fake suspense and drag things out. Instead, she gives us the gist of the truth pretty early on and devotes the remainder of the story to a meticulous reconstruction of how such a thing could happen and then be hidden from the people whose lives it most affects. If you believe that coincidences are often the iceberg-dip of cosmic design, or at least the endpoint of a chain reaction of interrelated events, you’ll appreciate the validation The Gullspång Miracle will give you."

Lucy Mangan of The Guardian praised the film, writing that "twists follow that splinter more supposed truths and have even Fredriksson exclaiming in frustration and bewilderment, but she records the fallout unflinchingly. The film becomes a meditation on the distance between reconcilable and irreconcilable differences, the impact of nature and nurture and the power of religion to divide as well as unite. It is a terribly sad story, albeit beautifully told. In the end, you can only shake your head at the layers of complexity contained within any family and hope that, when the excavations are complete, everyone can make their peace with them, with each other and with themselves."

Theodoor Steen of ScreenAnarchy praised the film's first two acts, but felt its conclusion was unsatisfying, noting: "The film evolves from a magical realist story about chances and coincidence, into a cringe comedy about family, and then into a true crime thriller, and after into a metatextual documentary about how we tell stories. It's a lot for one film, and The Gullspång Miracle doesn't fully stick the landing. It's a story in search of a conclusion, and part of the lack of closure is built into the metatextual ending."

=== Accolades ===
Institution	Year	Category	Recipient(s)	Result	Ref.
Biografilm Festival	2024	Best Film – Young Critics Award	Maria Fredriksson	Won	
Cleveland International Film Festival	2024	Ad Hoc Docs Award	Maria Fredriksson	Nominated	
Guldbagge Awards	2024	Best Film	Ina Holmqvist	Nominated	
Guldbagge Awards	2024	Best Director	Maria Fredriksson	Nominated	
Guldbagge Awards	2024	Best Editing	Mark Bukdahl; Orvar Anklew	Nominated	
Guldbagge Awards	2024	Best Documentary Feature	The Gullspång Miracle	Won	
Palm Springs International Film Festival	2024	Best Documentary	Maria Fredriksson	Nominated	
Tribeca Film Festival	2023	Best Documentary Feature	Maria Fredriksson	Nominated	
Tribeca Film Festival	2023	Best Editing	Mark Bukdahl; Orvar Anklew	Won	
Visions du Réel	2024	Grand Angle Award	Maria Fredriksson	Nominated	
