= Fragility (film) =

- Skörheten
- Directed by: Ahang Bashi
- Produced by: David Herdies Momento Film
- Cinematography: Maria Åkesson, Ahang Bashi
- Music by: Jakob Lindhegen
- Production company: Momento Film
- Release dates: February 4, 2016 (Göteborg); September 16, 2016
- Running time: 73 minutes
- Country: Sweden
- Language: Swedish

Fragility is a 2016 Swedish documentary film directed by Ahang Bashi.

== Synopsis ==
Just when her career is at its peak, the filmmaker Ahang Bashi falls into a deep hole of panic disorder and depression. With the camera as her companion, Ahang explores anxiety's vertiginous world of both darkness and hope. The film depicts her worst moments as well as the most loving gestures from the surroundings. It also takes us back in time, to her escape to Sweden and to the little girl who didn't understand. In 2016 the film was a nominee for Tempo Documentary Award on Tempo Film Festival and won the Stockholm Prize through Nöjesguiden. One year later it was awarded Newcomer of the year at Swedish Guldbaggegalan, and it won Best Swedish Feature – The City Of Gothenburg Award, at the Gothenburg Film Festival.
