= Finn Thrana =

Norwegian barrister and civil servant

Personal details
- Born: 8 March 1915 Søndre Land, Norway
- Died: 21 January 2006 (aged 90) Hole, Norway
- Party: Nasjonal Samling (1934–1945)
- Education: Royal Frederick University

Finn Thrana (8 March 1915, Søndre Land Municipality – 21 January 2006) was a Norwegian barrister and civil servant for Nasjonal Samling.

He was a jurist by education, having graduated from the Royal Frederick University in 1938. From the same year he worked as a junior solicitor in Gjøvik. He was a member of Quisling's Fascist party Nasjonal Samling from 1934.

In 1940, after the occupation of Norway by Nazi Germany had started, Nasjonal Samling became the only legal party in Norway. In the autumn of 1940 Thrana negotiated for his party with the Norwegian Agrarian Association. In 1941 he was hired as assistant secretary in the Secretariat of the Government, and in 1942 he was promoted to secretary of the government. In this position, he had responsibility for the government's protocols, public announcements and job appointments. He also had responsibility for the office that reviewed pleas in criminal cases. From 1944 he was the Nasjonal Samling Führer in the county of Oppland. The German occupation ended on 8 May 1945, and Thrana promptly lost his position.

In the post-war legal purge in Norway, Thrana was sentenced to 15 years of penal labour. He was released on 1 August 1950.

After the war he helped Vidkun Quisling, who was sentenced to death, write his will. He was also Maria Quisling's trustee after her death. In 1951 he was hired in the Norwegian Tax Administration, and in 1955 he opened his own lawyer's office which he operated until retiring at the age of 80. From 1966 he had access to work with Supreme Court cases, and worked in this field until his retirement.

Thrana was also involved in "alternative" history writing about the Nazis in World War II. In 2001 he released the book Vi ville et land som var frelst og fritt. Med Nasjonal samling under okkupasjonen 1940–45. The book got an unfavourable review from Yngvar Ustvedt in Verdens Gang, who gave it a "die throw" of 1 (worst). Historian Ole Kristian Grimnes regarded the book as a personal defence document, but added that one could benefit from reviewing the legal purge in Norway after World War II, which Thrana criticized, again. In late 2005 Thrana submitted parts of the Quisling archives to the National Archival Services of Norway. He died in January 2006.
