= Forever (2023 film) =

2023 Swedish drama film

- Promotional poster
- Directed by: Anders Hazelius
- Screenplay by: Jessika Jankert
- Produced by: Stefan H. Lindén; Erik Lundqvist
- Starring: Flutra Cela; Judith Sigfridsson; Agnes Lindström Bolmgren
- Music by: Elvis Suljevic
- Production companies: SF Studios; Film i Väst
- Release date: 7 July 2023
- Running time: 103 minutes
- Country: Sweden
- Language: Swedish

Forever is a 2023 Swedish coming-of-age sports drama film directed by Anders Hazelius and written by Jessika Jankert. The film follows Mila (Flutra Cela) and Kia (Judith Sigfridsson) as teenage football players, whose close friendship is strained by the arrival of a demanding new coach, Lollo (Agnes Lindström Bolmgren). It premiered on 7 July 2023 to generally positive reviews from Swedish critics.

== Plot ==
Mila, a 14-year-old football player, is inseparable from her best friend and teammate Kia: "Mila + Kia forever" is even written on their cleats. Mila struggles in school and became interested in football after watching her now-deceased father play in Kosovo. At a match, Mila scores but is roughly checked in retaliation. She angrily confronts both the player and the referee before Kia intervenes.

After the game, the coach introduces Lollo Wallin, a well-known national team player who has returned to her hometown to coach a junior team. Mila and Kia excitedly watch old footage of Lollo on the bus, where they also notice Kia's crush, Samir. Mila is late to her first practice under Lollo and is punished with laps; Lollo later assigns her to be second-string. Mila is upset and contemplates quitting. Lollo runs demanding drills to show Mila she needs a team to succeed. Mila is told not to return if she will let the team down again. Lollo announces that the team will play in the Gothia Cup. She also tells Mila that her anger is both her greatest strength and her greatest weakness as a forward.

As Kia grows closer to Samir and to teammate Shadi, Mila becomes increasingly isolated and devotes herself to training. Her cleats deteriorate, and after lying to Lollo about having replacements, Mila steals a pair from the boys' changing room. Tensions rise when Shadi becomes upset during a drill and is told by Lollo that maybe football is not for her. The girls eavesdrop on an emergency meeting revealing that Shadi's father is leaving the club and that only the boys' team will be sent to Gothia. Mila challenges the boys to play for it. In a short match, the girls defeat the boys, earning the right to go to Gothia. Afterwards, Samir angrily rejects Kia.

Following the victory, the girls team are accused of being lesbians. Accused of stealing the cleats, Mila says Kia gave them to her. Kia covers for Mila but is hurt by the betrayal. Mila continues lying about her grades at school and gets her first period. At Kia's birthday party and later at a graduation celebration, tensions escalate between the girls, culminating in a truth or dare kiss that leaves both upset. Mila injures her ankle in a dare.

Mila's mother discovers her failing grades and forbids her from going to Gothia, instead enrolling her in summer school. Mila sneaks out to join the team. Playing through her injury, she helps the team reach the semi-finals, though Kia grows frustrated with Lollo's coaching and is benched during the final at Ullevi. After disobeying curfew, Kia is sent home, leading to a confrontation in which Mila claims Kia means nothing to her.

Mila's mother arrives during the semi-final, which Mila loses after missing a final shot. At home, Mila dismantles her football-themed room and returns the stolen cleats to Leo. Lollo visits her to apologise and offers her an opportunity for her to try out for a more elite team. Mila reconciles with Kia, who admits she no longer wants to play football and gives Mila her cleats. In the future, Mila plays in a crowded stadium as Kia cheers her on from the stands.

== Cast ==
- Flutra Cela as "Mila" Mirlinda: a headstrong 14-year-old football forward
- Judith Sigfridsson as Kia: Mila's best friend
- Agnes Lindström Bolmgren as Lollo: Mila and Kia's demanding new coach, a former national team player
- Eleftheria Gerofoka as Besa: Mila's mother; emigrated to Sweden from Kosovo
- Joel Forslund Nylén as Leo
- Mustapha Aarab as Samir: Kia's crush

== Production ==
The film was directed by Anders Hazelius and written by Jessika Jankert. The producers were Stefan H. Lindén and Erik Lundqvist, through SF Studios. A co-production with Film i Väst, it was filmed in Uddevalla and Gothenburg in 2022. Lead actresses Cela and Sigfridsson met on the set of Forever, but as of July 2023 both played for BK Häcken FF. The film's score was composed by Elvis Suljevic.

== Release ==
The film premiered in theatres on 7 July 2023.

== Reception ==
The film earned an average rating of 3.8/5 based on 11 critic reviews on the Swedish review aggregator site Kritiker.

== See also ==
- List of Swedish films of the 2020s
- List of association football films
