= Quisling: The Final Days =

2024 Norwegian film by Erik Poppe

- Theatrical release poster
- Norwegian: Quislings siste dager
- Directed by: Erik Poppe
- Written by: Anna Bache-Wiig; Siv Rajendram Eliassen; Ravn Lanesskog
- Produced by: Finn Gjerdrum; Stein B. Kvae
- Starring: Gard B. Eidsvold; Anders Danielsen Lie; Lisa Carlehed; Lisa Loven Kongsli
- Cinematography: Jonas Alarik
- Edited by: Einar Egeland
- Music by: Jonas Colstrup
- Production company: Paradox Film
- Distributed by: SF Norge
- Release dates: 18 August 2024 (Haugesund); 13 September 2024 (Norway)
- Running time: 146 minutes
- Country: Norway
- Languages: Norwegian; Russian

Quisling: The Final Days (Norwegian: Quislings siste dager) is a 2024 Norwegian biographical historical drama film directed by Erik Poppe. Starring Gard B. Eidsvold, it follows the final days of Vidkun Quisling before his execution in October 1945. It premiered at the Norwegian International Film Festival on 18 August 2024.

== Premise ==
As a result of the legal purge, Vidkun Quisling is sentenced to death for his collaboration with Nazi Germany during their occupation of Norway. He is held in Akershus Prison as he awaits execution.

== Cast ==
- Gard B. Eidsvold as Vidkun Quisling, former head of a pro-Nazi puppet government who is put on trial for treason
- Anders Danielsen Lie as Peder Olsen, a hospital chaplain tasked with providing pastoral care for Quisling
- Lisa Carlehed as Maria Quisling, Vidkun Quisling's Ukrainian-born wife
- Lisa Loven Kongsli as Heidi Olsen, Peder's wife
- Nils Jørgen Kaalstad as Dagfinn Hauge, a priest at Akershus Prison
- Arthur Hakalahti as Arvid, one of Quisling's jailers
- Stein Torleif Bjella as Vilhelm Ullman, a childhood friend of Quisling called to testify on his behalf
- Øyvind Brandtzæg as Henrik Bergh, Vidkun Quisling's defense lawyer
- Lasse Kolsrud as Eivind Berggrav, Primate of the Church of Norway
- Vidar Sandem as Erik Solem, the judge presiding over the trial
- Hans Rønningen as Annæus Schjødt, the prosecutor in the trial
- Benjamin Lønne Røsler as Leo Eitinger, a Czech-Norwegian psychiatrist and an Auschwitz survivor called to testify against Quisling
- Anderz Eide as Helge Lindboe Nordtømme, the police inspector leading the investigation of the mass graves at Trandumskogen
- Brede Fristad as Per Røed, one of Quisling's bodyguards during the trial
- Per Gørvell as Georg Monrad Krohn, head of the Department of Neurology at Rikshospitalet
- Hauk Heyerdahl as Rolf Jørgen Fuglesang, former Minister of Culture in Quisling's regime
- Per Vermeli as Johan Andreas Lippestad, former Minister of Social Affairs in Quisling's regime who vainly tries to negotiate an honorable surrender for his peers

== Production ==
The film was announced in 2021. That year, the film received 18 million kroner ($1.7 million) in production subsidies from the Norwegian Film Institute. Gard B. Eidsvold and Anders Danielsen Lie joined the cast in September 2022. The actors spent 10 weeks in rehearsals for the film.

== Release ==
Promotional stills from the film were released in December 2023. The film premiered at the Norwegian International Film Festival on 18 August 2024. It had its international premiere at the Toronto International Film Festival on 8 September 2024.

== Reception ==
Alissa Simon of Variety called the film a "superb historical drama about the far-right's threat to democracy" and "perhaps the strongest work yet from veteran Norwegian helmer Erik Poppe".

== See also ==
- Quisling, a Scandinavian colloquialism for a traitor or collaborator, named after Vidkun Quisling
