= JJ+E =

2021 Swedish film

- Poster
- Swedish: Vinterviken
- Directed by: Alexis Almström
- Written by: Dunja Vujovic
- Starring: Magnus Krepper; Marika Lagercrantz; Simon Mezher
- Production companies: Filmlance International AB; Netflix Studios; Sveriges Television (SVT)
- Distributed by: Netflix
- Release date: September 8, 2021
- Running time: 90 minutes
- Country: Sweden
- Language: Swedish

JJ+E is a 2021 Swedish film directed by Alexis Almström, written by Dunja Vujovic, based on the book Vinterviken by Mats Wahl and starring Magnus Krepper, Marika Lagercrantz and Simon Mezher. It was released by Netflix on September 8, 2021.

== Cast ==
- Magnus Krepper as Frank
- Marika Lagercrantz as Vic
- Simon Mezher as Jacob
- Mustapha Aarab as John-John
- Albin Grenholm as Patrik
- Loreen as Maria
- Elsa Öhrn as Elisabeth
- Jonay Pineda Skallak as Sluggo
- Elsa Bergström Terent as Patricia
- Otto Hargne as Karl
- Ambra Andela Ugorji as Dunya
- Pär Boman as Festgäst
- Andreas Gauffin as Kock
- Mikael Örjansberg as Festgäst
- Dunja Vujovic as Festgäst
