= Knocking (2021 film) =

2021 thriller film

- Sundance release poster
- Swedish: Knackningar
- Directed by: Frida Kempff
- Written by: Emma Broström, based on a story by Johan Theorin
- Produced by: Erik Andersson
- Starring: Cecilia Milocco; Krister Kern; Albin Grenholm; Ville Virtanen; Alexander Salzberger
- Cinematography: Hannes Krantz
- Edited by: Erika Gonzales
- Music by: Martin Dirkov
- Production company: Läsk
- Release date: January 30, 2021 (Sundance)
- Running time: 78 minutes
- Country: Sweden
- Language: Swedish

Knocking (Swedish: Knackningar) is a 2021 Swedish thriller film directed by Frida Kempff and written by Emma Broström, based on a short story by Johan Theorin. The film stars Cecilia Milocco, Krister Kern, Albin Grenholm, Ville Virtanen, and Alexander Salzberger.

The film had its world premiere at the 2021 Sundance Film Festival on January 30, 2021.

== Plot ==
A traumatized woman seeks the truth behind mysterious knocking noises from the apartment above her.

== Cast ==
The cast include:

- Cecilia Milocco
- Krister Kern
- Albin Grenholm
- Ville Virtanen
- Alexander Salzberger

== Release ==
The film had its world premiere at the 2021 Sundance Film Festival on January 30, 2021, in the Midnight section.

== Reception ==
On review aggregator website Rotten Tomatoes, 81% of 42 critics gave the film a positive review, with an average rating of 6.5/10. The critics consensus reads: "A slow-burning thriller that teeters between reality and delusion, Knocking views social issues through a blurred lens streaked with horror."
