= Villa Grande (Oslo) =

Villa in Oslo, Norway

Coordinates: 59°53′56.245″N 10°40′42.006″E

- Norwegian Cultural Heritage Site
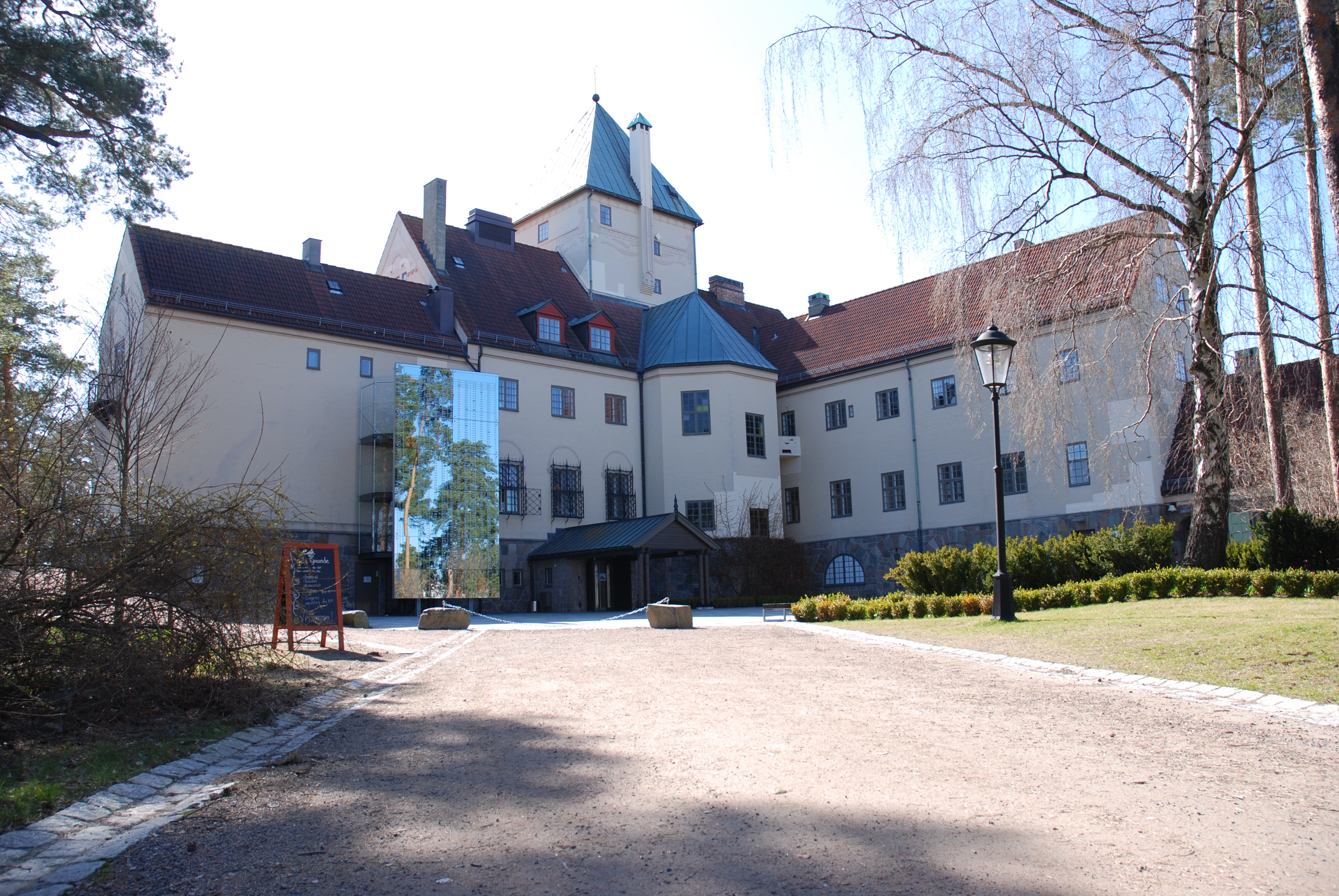
- Entrance to Villa Grande
- Type: Residence
- Status: Protected by regulation
- County: Oslo
- Municipality: Oslo
- Year built: 1921
- ID: 90331

Villa Grande is a property on Bygdøy in Oslo, Norway. The main building is located on top of a hill, raised above the surrounding residential buildings.

== History ==
The construction of the building began in 1917, designed by the architects Christian Morgenstierne (1880–1967) and Arne Eide (1881-1957). The original owner was Sam Eyde, founder of Norsk Hydro. He sold the incomplete building after one year. Subsequent owner Henrik Østervold (1878-1957) engaged architect Jens Zetlitz Monrad Kielland (1866–1926) to prepare new and reduced building plans. Østervold built the building in the period 1918-21. In 1921, Aker Municipality took over the property. In 1926, shipowner Wilh. Wilhelmsen (1872–1955) handed over Villa Grande as a gift to the Norwegian government.

In 1941, it was finished and furnished as a residence for Maria (1900–1980) and Vidkun Quisling (1887-1945). They lived there until the latter was arrested in 1945. During this period the villa was known as Gimlé. After Maria Quisling had been evicted, General Andrew Thorne (1885–1970), commander-in-chief of Allied forces in Norway, together with his staff, used Villa Grande as their headquarters from 22 May 1945. They stayed until 31 October, when Thorne went back to Great Britain.

Since 2006, Villa Grande has housed the Norwegian research institution Center for Studies of Holocaust and Religious Minorities.

== Gallery ==
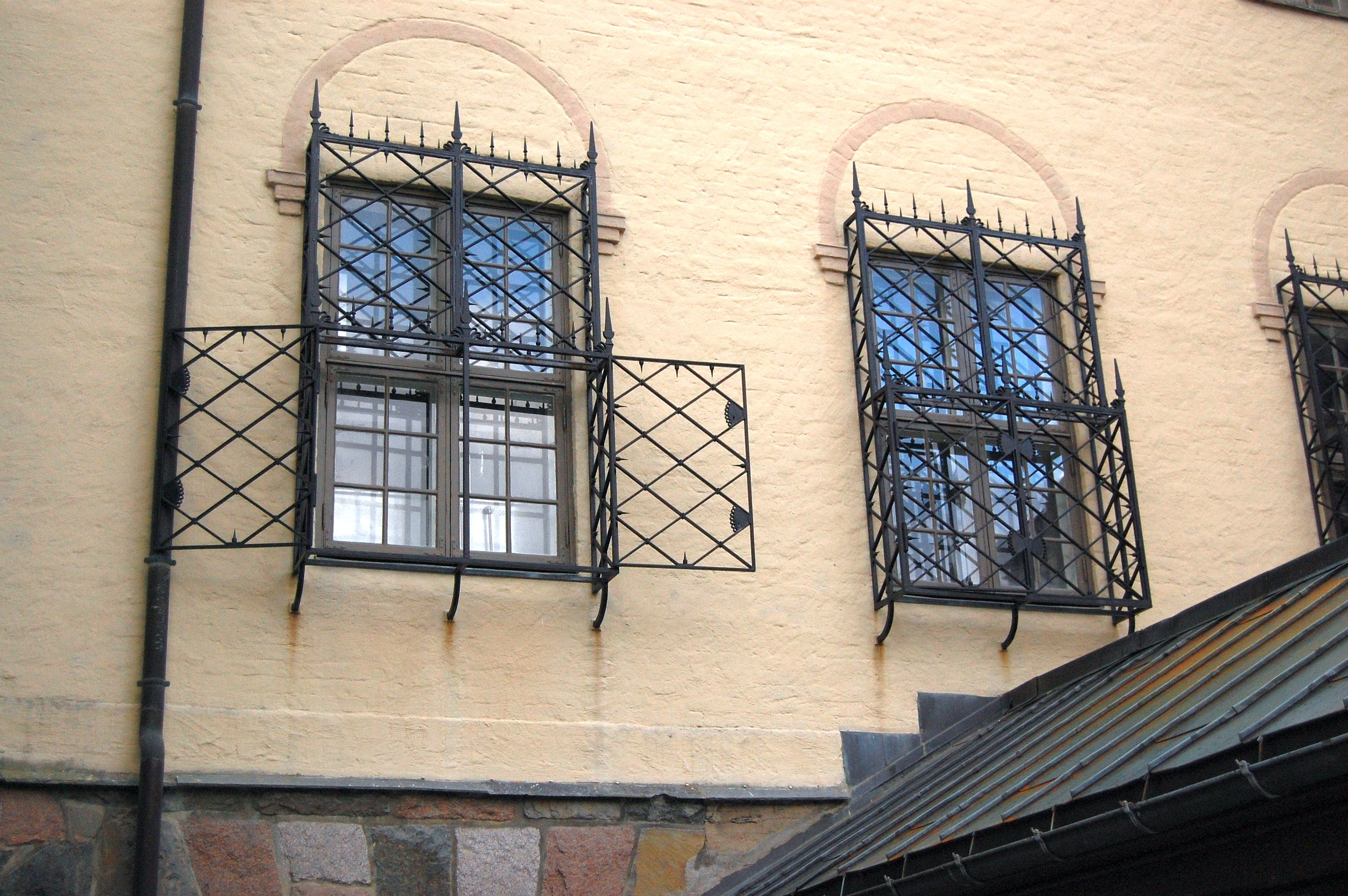

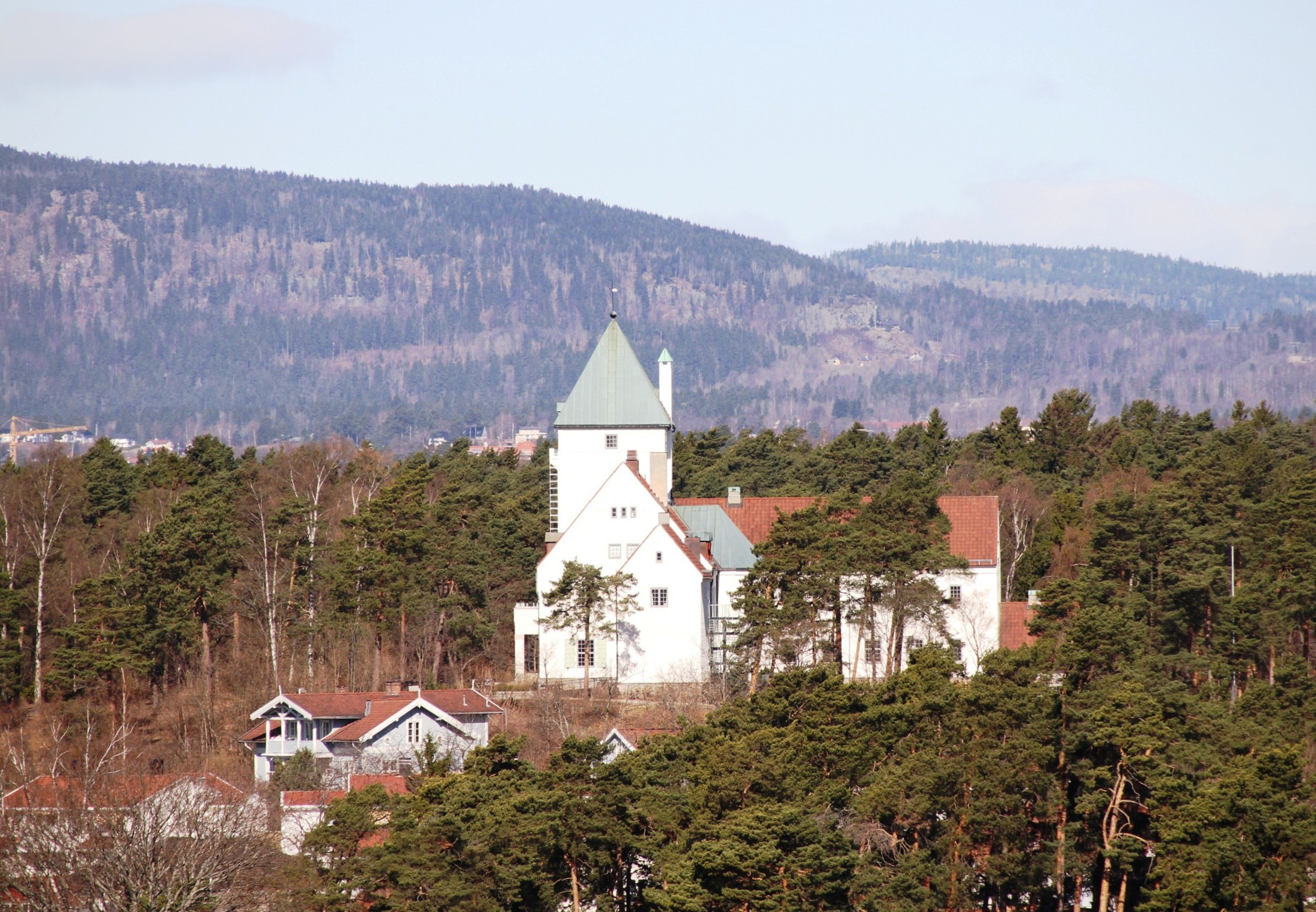

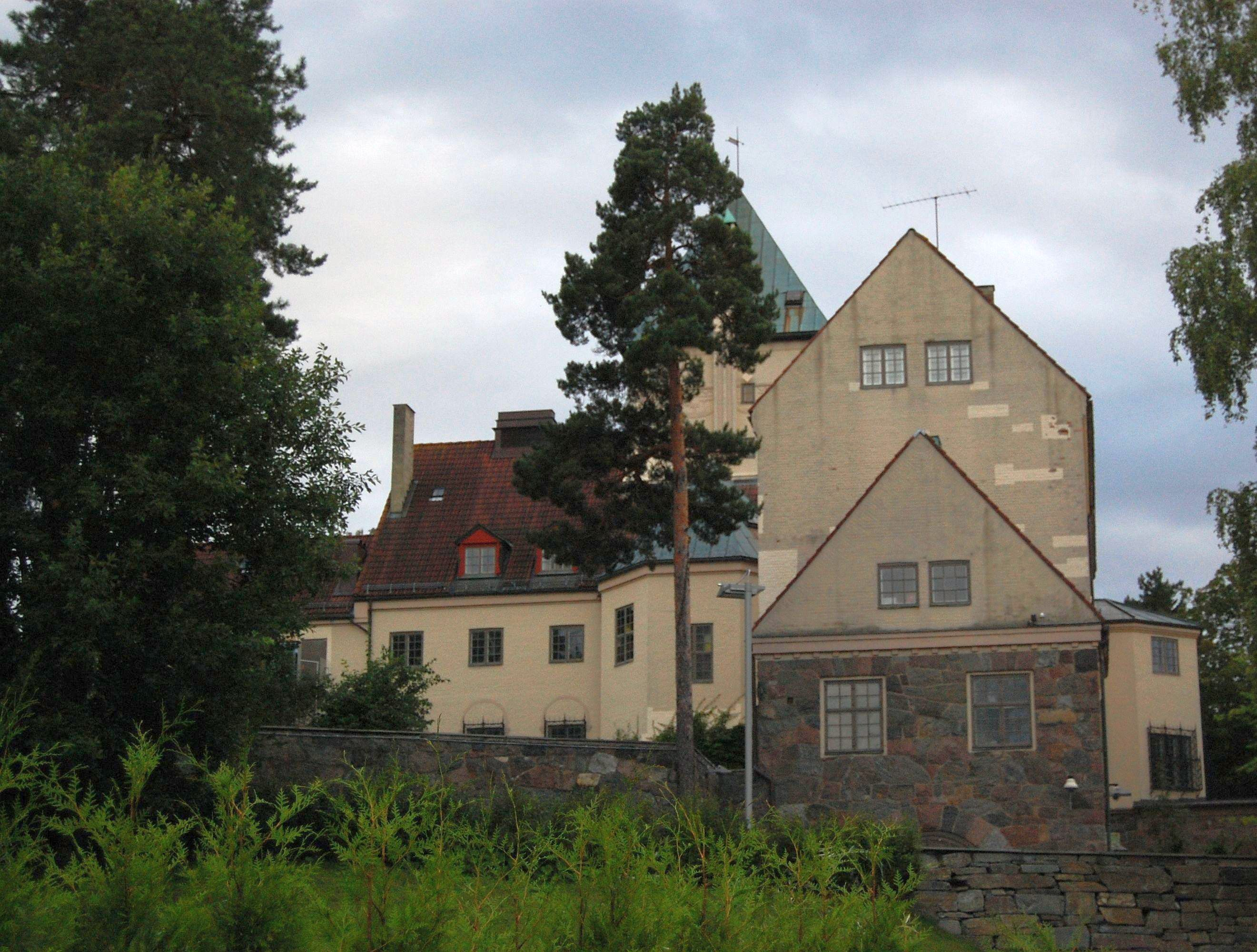
