= Erik Quisling =

American writer and entrepreneur (born 1971)

Erik Quisling (born 1971) is an American author, musician, filmmaker and entrepreneur. He has two children, Sofia Quisling and Gunnar Quisling. He and his wife Adriana Quisling have been married since 2005. They currently reside in Rancho Santa Fe, California.

== Career ==
After graduating from UCLA in 1993 with a degree in economics, Quisling wrote and illustrated his first book, The Angry Clam, published by Grand Central Publishing (formerly Warner Books), an imprint of Hachette Book Group in 1998. Quisling then produced the documentary Welcome to the Rainbow, a portrait of legendary rock and roll nightclubs in Los Angeles: the Whisky a Go Go, the Roxy Theatre, and the Rainbow Bar & Grill. Featuring rock legends Ozzy Osbourne, Robbie Krieger, Lemmy Kilmister, and more, the film premiered in Los Angeles in January 2000.

With his Welcome to the Rainbow producing partner and fellow writer Austin Williams (Crimson Orgy, The Platinum Loop), Quisling co-authored Straight Whisky: A Living History of Sex, Drugs, and Rock ‘n’ Roll on the Sunset Strip, a book expanding on the content of the film. Straight Whisky was published in 2003 by Bonus Books. It is now being reprinted by Taylor Trade Publishing.

Quisling is also the author of Fables from the Mud, published by Borderlands Press. His most recent book, Effortless: A Simple Guide to Living the Life You Truly Want, was published in 2020.

As a musician, Quisling composed and recorded, The Immortal Poets, a collection of songs using the poems of world-renowned poets, originally released under a label. Quisling was also part of the duo Thin Black Line with Jeremy Penick, a California country rock band. Thin Black Line released their eponymous debut album in October 2013. The album features hick-hop rebel country music stars Moonshine Bandits on the track "All the Crazy People".

Erik Quisling is an entrepreneur, owning and operating several business ventures, and is widely known as The Barcode Guru. In 1999, he launched Buyabarcode.com. He is also the founder of TheBarcodeRegistry.com, a global source for barcode ownership verification. On March 8, 2022, TheBarcodeRegistry.com was featured by Amazon in a case study about the use of Artificial Intelligence for the purposes of detecting counterfeit products. Erik, along with his business partner James Shields, is also the founder of the North American Cannabis Registry (NACR) - a tech company dedicated to identifying illegal products, dispensaries, and delivery drivers in the cannabis industry. He also operates Upaya House, an independent publisher of fiction and non-fiction books and music.
