= Trouble (2024 film) =

2024 Swedish action-comedy film

- Swedish: Strul
- Directed by: Jon Holmberg
- Written by: Jon Holmberg, Tapio Leopold
- Based on: Strul by Björn Skifs
- Produced by: Anna Carlsten
- Starring: Filip Berg
- Production company: FLX
- Distributed by: Netflix
- Release date: October 3, 2024
- Running time: 98m
- Country: Sweden
- Language: Swedish

Trouble (known in Sweden as Strul) is a Swedish action-comedy film directed by Jon Holmberg which premiered on Netflix on October 3, 2024. This film is a remake of the 1988 movie of the same name (Strul).

== Plot ==
Conny Rundqvist, an electronics salesman and handyman, is at the scene of a home invasion at the house of a client while setting up their TV, but does not know it is happening because he is wearing noise-cancelling headphones. When he looks around after taking his headphones off, he finds the homeowner has been attacked. The invader attacks Conny from behind and knocks him out. He wakes up at the same time the wife, Mimmi, arrives home, who assumes that he killed her husband.

Conny is interrogated by Helena, a cop; while Diana, who is also a police officer, observes. Conny is assigned a seemingly incompetent lawyer, Hasse, and ultimately is sent to prison. While incarcerated, he escapes to confront Mimmi and tell her that he's innocent and then returns to prison before anyone notices. Helena then meets with Mimmi and asks if she found her husband's cell phone. Mimmi discovers that the cell phone has evidence that proves Helena is a crook, which she saw in a photo gallery when her husband's phone was connected via Bluetooth to her TV, so she lies to Helena and sends her away. Mimmi calls Conny's prison phone and tells him to meet her in a public place.

Conny, Musse and Norinder escape prison and make their way to the airport to board a private jet. On their way, Conny stops and retrieves the cell phone with the evidence on it and plans to give it to his lawyer to hopefully get his conviction ruling overturned. At the airport, Conny abandons Musse and Norinder and tries to hand the evidence to his lawyer, who is waiting for him at the airport. But Helena stops Conny by shooting him in the shoulder, stealing the evidence, and sending him to the hospital.

Helena visits Conny in the hospital and tries to inject him with cyanide but is interrupted by Diana, who also pays Conny a visit. Diana learns that Helena is crooked and escapes with Conny out through the window. Conny's and Diana's profiles are shown on the news and deemed fugitives. While evading the police, they go to obtain new evidence, which is saved on the hard drive of Mimmi's TV, and take it to Hasse, who is at a hotel. At the hotel, they discover that Hesse and Helena are working together, so they devise a plan to apprehend the two crooks together. They call the police on themselves and bait a team led by Josef to the hotel. Diana and Conny get separated, and Helena abandons a drug exchange to aid in the arrest of Diana. While Helena and Josef are in the elevator, Conny hooks up the hard drive to the screen in the elevator to show Josef the evidence, who promptly arrests Helena.

== Cast ==
- Filip Berg – Conny Rundqvist
- Eva Melander – Helena
- Amy Deasismont – Diana
- Måns Nathanaelson – Hasse
- Joakim Sällquist – Musse
- Dejan Čukić – Norinder
- Sissela Benn – Mimmi
- Magnus Sundberg – Jorma
- Shirin Golshin – Ayla
- Paloma Winneth – Camilla
- Peter Gardiner – Josef
- Björn Skifs – Himself (Cameo appearance)

== Reception ==
In Sweden, the film received recognition at the Guldbagge Awards in 2024. Berg was nominated for Best Actor, and Melander won Best Supporting Role.

In Germany, the film performed particularly well, ranking fifth on the Most Streamed charts for October 2024.
