= Paradise Is Burning =

2023 drama film

- Directed by: Mika Gustafson
- Written by: Mika Gustafson, Alexander Öhrstrand
- Starring: Bianca Delbravo; Dilvin Asaad; Safira Mossberg; Ida Engvoll
- Cinematography: Sine Vadstrup Brooker
- Edited by: Anders Skov
- Music by: Giorgio Giampà
- Release date: September 8, 2023 (Venice)
- Running time: 109 min
- Country: Sweden
- Language: Swedish

Paradise Is Burning (Swedish: Paradiset brinner) is a 2023 drama film co-written and directed by Mika Gustafson, in her fictional feature debut.

== Plot ==
Three sisters aged 7 to 15, live alone after their mother vanishes for whole swathes of time. When the social services demand a family meeting, oldest sister Laura plans to find a stand in for their mother.

== Cast ==
- Bianca Delbravo as Laura
- Dilvin Asaad as Mira
- Safira Mossberg as Steffi
- Ida Engvoll as Hanna
- Marta Oldenburg as Zara
- Mitja Siren as Sasha

== Release ==
The film premiered in the Orizzonti section at the 80th Venice International Film Festival, in which Gustafson was awarded best director.

In October 2023 the film received the Sutherland Award for Best First Feature at the 67th London Film Festival.

== Reception ==
Paradise Is Burning has an approval rating of 100% on review aggregator website Rotten Tomatoes, based on 27 reviews, and an average rating of 7.1/10. Metacritic assigned the film a weighted average score of 68 out of 100, based on 6 critics, indicating "generally favorable reviews".
