= The Swedish Torpedo =

2024 biographical sports drama film

- Swedish: Den svenska torpeden
- Directed by: Frida Kempff
- Screenplay by: Frida Kempff; Marietta von Hausswolff von Baumgarten
- Produced by: David Herdies; Erik Andersson
- Starring: Josefin Neldén; Mikkel Boe Følsgaard; Lisa Carlehed
- Production company: Memento Films
- Distributed by: TriArt
- Release date: 6 September 2024 (TIFF)
- Running time: 120 minutes
- Country: Sweden

The Swedish Torpedo (Swedish: Den svenska torpeden) is a 2024 biographical sports drama film directed by Frida Kempff starring Josefin Neldén as Sally Bauer, a Swedish long distance swimmer who swam the English Channel in 1939. The film premiered in the Centrepiece section of the 2024 Toronto International Film Festival.

== Premise ==
In the days leading up to World War II, 30-year-old single mother Sally Bauer overcomes societal expectations as she swims the English Channel, becoming the first Scandinavian to accomplish the feat.

== Cast ==
- Josefin Neldén as Sally Bauer
- Mikkel Boe Følsgaard as Henry
- Lisa Carlehed as Carla

== Production ==
The Swedish Torpedo was supported in part by a grant from the Nordisk Film & TV Fond as well as funding from the Swedish Film Institute, Creative Europe, the Finnish Film Foundation, YLE, the Wallonia-Brussels Federation, the Estonian Film Institute, Konstnärsnämnden, and the Norrköpings filmfond.

Filming began in August 2023, with scenes shot in Sweden, Estonia, Belgium, and the United Kingdom.

== Release ==
On 6 September 2024, The Swedish Torpedo screened for the press and industry professionals at the Toronto International Film Festival. The film's first public screening took place at the festival on 12 September.
