= Martin Bengtsson (footballer) =

Swedish footballer

Personal information
- Full name: Martin Oskar Johan Bengtsson
- Date of birth: 14 March 1986 (age 40)
- Place of birth: Örebro, Sweden
- Position: Midfielder

Youth career
- –2002: IK Sturehov
- 2002–2003: Örebro SK
- 2004: Inter Milan

Senior career*
Years	Team	Apps	(Gls)
2003	Örebro SK	1	(0)
2005	ÖSK Ungdom		

International career
2002–2003	Sweden U17	20	(3)
2004	Sweden U19	2	(0)
- * Club domestic league appearances and goals

Martin Oskar Johan Bengtsson (born 14 March 1986) is a Swedish former professional footballer who played as a midfielder.

== Club career ==
Bengtsson started playing football for IK Sturehov as a child and stayed with the club until he was signed by Örebro SK as a 15-year-old in 2002. He made his Allsvenskan debut at 17 years old for Örebro SK during the 2003 season in a game against Enköpings SK when he came on as a substitute for Mirza Jelecak. After the 2003 season, Bengtsson left Örebro SK to sign for the Serie A club Inter Milan. However, he left the Italian club after only nine months after suffering from depression and ultimately trying to take his own life.

In 2005, he signed for Örebro SK Ungdom in Division 2 Norra Svealand but only played for one season before retiring from professional football at the age of 19.

== International career ==
Bengtsson appeared 20 times for the Sweden U17 team, scoring three goals. He also appeared twice for the Sweden U19 team.

== Personal life ==
In 2007, he wrote the autobiography I skuggan av San Siro (English: In the shadow of San Siro) about his experiences as a young footballer at Inter Milan.

In the book he reveals that nine months after signing with Inter, he tries to take his own life. He details that the reasons for this were sex addiction, drug abuse, loneliness and boredom.

In 2020, the book was adapted into a movie called Tigers directed by Ronnie Sandahl.

In an interview with Aftonbladet, Bengtsson describes the identity crisis that can occur when a footballer is injured and he feels "who am I if I am not a player?"

After quitting football, Bengtsson took up careers in journalism and music.

== Career statistics ==
=== Club ===
Appearances and goals by club, season and competition
Club	Season	League			Svenska Cupen		Continental		Total	
Club	Season	Division	Apps	Goals	Apps	Goals	Apps	Goals	Apps	Goals
Örebro SK	2003	Allsvenskan	1	0			—			
ÖSK Ungdom	2005	Division 2 Norra Svealand					—			
Career total							0	0		

=== International ===
Appearances and goals by national team and year
National team	Year	Apps	Goals
Sweden U17	2002	12	3
Sweden U17	2003	8	0
Sweden U17	Total	20	3
Sweden U19	2004	2	0
Sweden U19	Total	2	0
Career total		22	3
