= Dogborn =

2022 Swedish thriller film

- Directed by: Isabella Carbonell
- Screenplay by: Isabella Carbonell
- Produced by: Farima Karimi; David Herdies; Erik Andersson
- Starring: Silvana Imam
- Cinematography: Maja Dennhag
- Music by: Nisj
- Release date: 2022
- Country: Sweden

Dogborn is a 2022 Swedish thriller film written and directed by Isabella Carbonell, in her directorial debut.

The film premiered in the International Critics' Week section of the 79th edition of the Venice Film Festival. It marked the acting debut of rapper Silvana Imam.

== Cast ==
- Silvana Imam as Systern
- Philip Oros as Brodern
- Emma Lu as Yubi
- Mia Liu as Mai
- Henrik Norlén as Yann
- Hannes Meidal as Kjell
- Rikard Svensson as Simon
