= Tigers (2020 film) =

2020 international film

- Film poster
- Directed by: Ronnie Sandahl
- Screenplay by: Ronnie Sandahl
- Based on: I skuggan av San Siro by Martin Bengtsson
- Produced by: Piodor Gustafsson; Lucia Nicolai; Marcello Paolillo; Birgitte Skovl
- Starring: Erik Enge
- Cinematography: Marek Wieser
- Edited by: Åsa Mossberg
- Music by: Jonas Colstrup
- Production companies: Black Spark Film & TV; Art Of Panic; SF Studios Production AB
- Release date: 18 October 2020 (Roma)
- Running time: 116 minutes
- Countries: Sweden; Denmark; Italy; Spain
- Languages: English; Swedish; Italian
- Box office: $ 2 559

Tigers is a 2020 international co-produced sports drama film written and directed by Ronnie Sandahl and based on the autobiography I skuggan av San Siro by Martin Bengtsson. It was selected as the Swedish entry for the Best International Feature Film at the 94th Academy Awards, but it was not nominated.

== Plot ==
The movie surrounds the true story of teenage football talent Martin Bengtsson's (Erik Enge) time as a 16-year-old professional footballer at the Italian club Inter Milan.

== Cast ==
- Erik Enge
- Alfred Enoch
- Johannes Bah Kuhnke
- Liv Mjönes
- Frida Gustavsson
- Martina Oberti

== Reception ==
=== Critical response ===
Tigers has an approval rating of 67% on review aggregator website Rotten Tomatoes, based on 9 reviews, and an average rating of 6.3/10. Metacritic assigned the film a weighted average score of 59 out of 100, based on 5 critics, indicating "mixed or average reviews".

=== Awards and nominations ===
==== Awards ====
- Busan International Film Festival: Flash Forward: Best Film

==== Nominations ====
- 2020 Rome Film Fest: Best Director (Ronnie Sandahl)

== See also ==
- List of submissions to the 94th Academy Awards for Best International Feature Film
- List of Swedish submissions for the Academy Award for Best International Feature Film
