= Winter Buoy =

- Film poster
- Directed by: Frida Kempff
- Produced by: David Herdies
- Starring: Doris Floding; Talia Benoliel Singer; Cheryl Dillon; David Oats
- Cinematography: Catherine Lutes
- Edited by: Erika Gonzales; Erik Andersson
- Release date: 25 January 2015
- Running time: 86 minutes
- Countries: Denmark; France; Sweden; Canada
- Language: English

Winter Buoy is a 2015 documentary film directed by the Swedish Cannes-awarded Frida Kempff. The film is about a group of nurses in Toronto helping pregnant women struggle with their homelessness, drug addictions and violent relationships.

The film had its premiere at the 2015 Gothenburg Film Festival where it was nominated to the Dragon Award Best Nordic Documentary. It was awarded Best Documentary at NIFF, Nordic International Film Festival, USA. It was also nominated to the 2015 First Films International Competition at Cinéma du Réel in Paris and to the Tempo Documentary Award at the 2015 Tempo Documentary Festival in Stockholm.
