= The Emigrants (2021 film) =

- Directed by: Erik Poppe
- Starring: Gustaf Skarsgård; Lisa Carlehed
- Release date: 25 December 2021
- Running time: 148 minutes
- Country: Sweden
- Language: Swedish

The Emigrants (Swedish: Utvandrarna) is a 2021 Swedish drama film based on the eponymous novel by Vilhelm Moberg. It is the second film adaptation of the novel, after the 1971 film by Jan Troell.

== Cast ==
- Gustaf Skarsgård - Karl-Oskar Nilsson
- Lisa Carlehed - Kristina
- Sofia Helin - Judit
- Tove Lo - Ulrika
- Stig Henrik Hoff - Captain Lorentz
