= Frida Kempff =

Swedish filmmaker (born 1977)

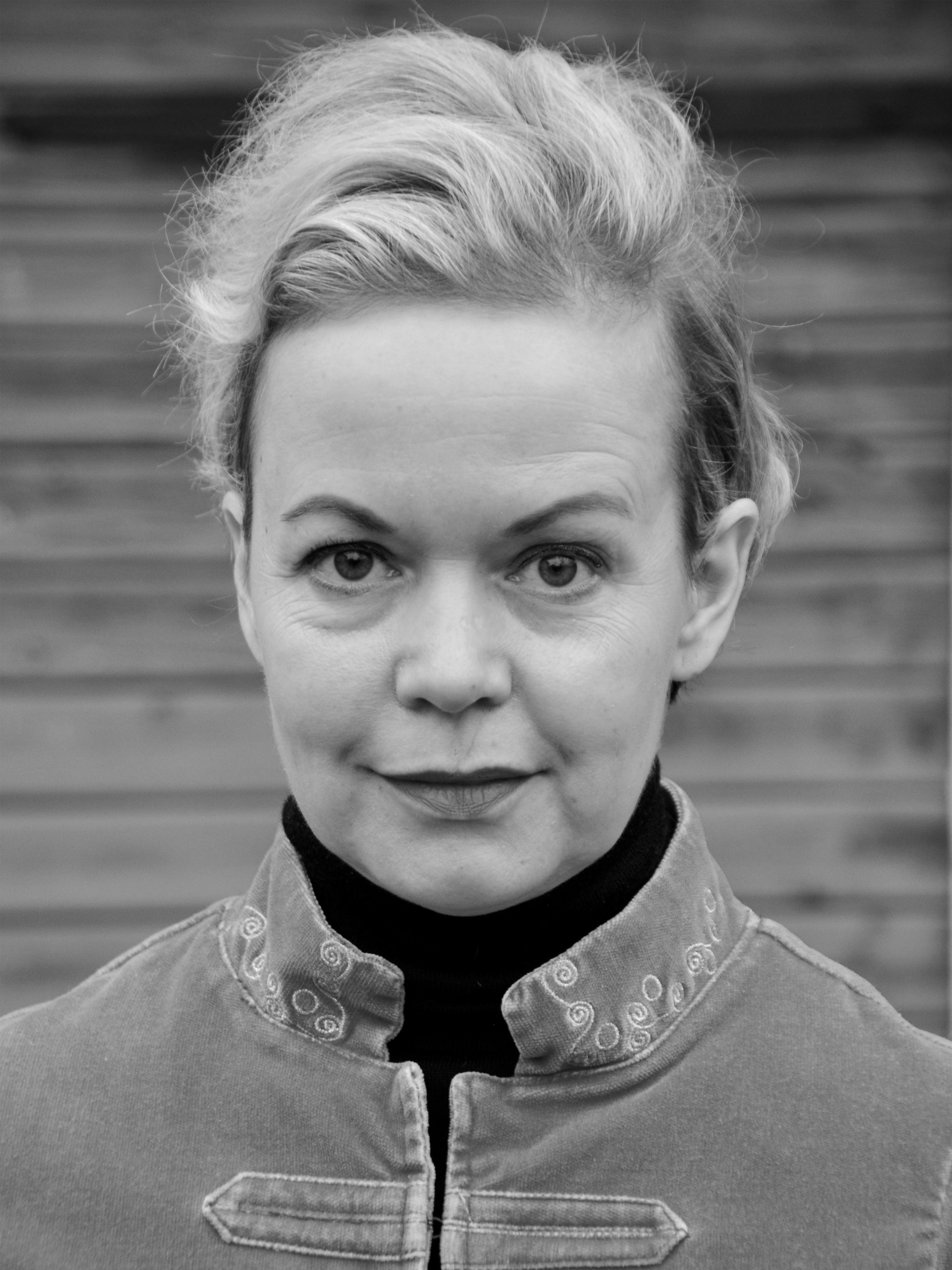
- Kempff in 2020
- Born: 1977 (age 47–48); Sala, Sweden
- Occupation(s): Film director, screenwriter

Frida Kempff (born 1977) is a Swedish filmmaker best known for the 2021 psychological thriller film Knocking.

== Early life ==
Kempff was born in 1977 in Sala, Sweden.

== Career ==
After graduating from the Stockholm Academy of Dramatic Arts, Kempff directed the documentary short film Bathing Micky about an elderly woman who is a member of her local bathing club. The short won the Prix du Jury at the 2010 Cannes Film Festival.

Kempff's fiction short While You Were Gone about a young man's changing relationship with his father premiered in 2011, followed by the 2015 documentary short Circles about a man's return to Stockholm after serving through Doctors Without Borders.

In 2015, Kempff's feature-length debut, Winter Buoy, premiered at that year's Gothenburg Film Festival. The documentary highlighted a public health program in Toronto supporting at-risk pregnant women.

Kempff next directed two more fictional short films: Dear Kid (2016), about a mother who suspects a swimming coach is abusing one of his pupils, and Wolf (2017), about a young woman who encounters a wolf that threatens her family's sheep.

Kempff's feature fiction film debut Knocking, based on a novella by Johan Theorin, debuted at the 2021 Sundance Film Festival.

The Swedish Torpedo, Kempff's biographical period drama about Swedish woman Sally Bauer swimming the English Channel, will premiere at the 2024 Toronto International Film Festival.

== Filmography ==
Year	English title	Original title	Notes	Ref.
2010	Bathing Micky	Micky Badar	Short film	
2011	While You Were Gone	Medan du var borta	Short film	
2015	Circles	Circlar	Short film	
2015	Winter Buoy	Vinterboj	—	
2016	Dear Kid	Älskade unge	Short film	
2017	Wolf	Varg	Short film	
2021	Knocking	Knackningar	—	
2024	The Swedish Torpedo †	Den svenska torpedoen	—	

== Awards and nominations ==
Year	Award	Category	Nominated work	Result	Ref.
2010	Cannes Film Festival	Prix du Jury – Short Film	Bathing Micky	Won	
2010	Expresion en Corto International Film Festival	Best Short Documentary	Bathing Micky	Won	
2010	Nordisk Panorama Film Festival	Nordic Documentary Film Award	Bathing Micky	Nominated	
2010	Skepto International Film Festival	Grand Prix	Bathing Micky	Won	
2011	Stockholm International Film Festival	1km Film Award	While You Were Gone	Nominated	
2015	Nordic International Film Festival	Best Documentary	Winter Buoy	Won	
2015	Gothenburg Film Festival	Best Nordic Documentary	Winter Buoy	Nominated	
2016	Stockholm International Film Festival	1km Film Awawrd	Dear Kid	Won	
2016	Nordisk Panorama	Nordic Short Film Award	Circles	Nominated	
2016	Gothenburg Film Festival	Short Film Award	Circles	Nominated	
2017	Cinalfalma Lisbon International Film Awards	Best Debut Film	Wolf	Won	
2021	Narcisse Award	Best Feature Film	Knocking	Nominated	
