= Maria Quisling =

Norwegian politician (1900–1980)

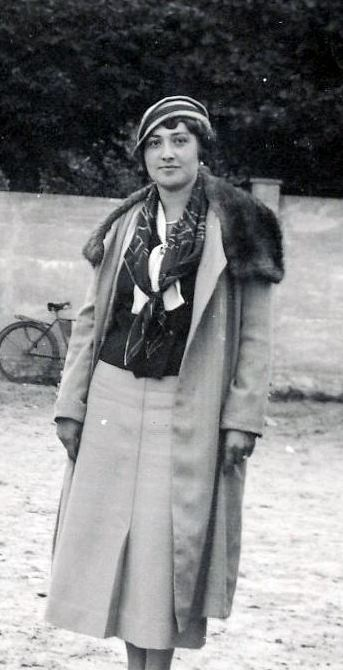
- Born: Maria Vasilyevna Pasek or Pasetchnikova; 10 October 1900; Kharkiv, Russian Empire (now Ukraine)
- Died: 17 January 1980 (aged 79); Uranienborg, Oslo, Norway
- Resting place: Gjerpen, Telemark, Norway
- Known for: Wife of Norwegian fascist politician Vidkun Quisling
- Spouse: Vidkun Quisling (m. 1923; died 1945)

Maria Quisling, born Maria Vasilyevna Pasek or Pasetchnikova (10 October 1900 – 17 January 1980), was known as the wife of the Norwegian fascist politician Vidkun Quisling, but some historians have doubts on whether the couple were legally married. The couple met in Kharkiv in 1923, and they were formally and informally married in September that year. For a few years, she lived in Norway and France and was often separated from Vidkun because of his work and travels. They settled permanently in Norway in 1929 where Vidkun was one of the founders of the fascist party Nasjonal Samling. During the German occupation of Norway, Vidkun led a pro-German puppet regime. Maria lived with him in the Villa Grande from 1941 to 1945 and served as hostess for social gatherings there and at the Royal Palace.

After Vidkun was found guilty of treason and sentenced to death, she made several appeals to authorities on his behalf but was unsuccessful. She was briefly arrested in 1946 for her actions during the occupation, but all charges were dropped. She fought for many years to get back the apartment and other properties that she and Vidkun had owned. A final settlement was reached in 1955, which gave her the apartment, many paintings and furniture and a sum of money. In 1959, she also got an urn with her husband's ashes, which she buried at Gjerpen Church yard in a small ceremony. After having lived a secluded life in Oslo after the war, she died in 1980, leaving her assets to a charity fund bearing her and Vidkun's name that each year gives a small sum of money to a limited number of elderly persons.

== Early life and marriage ==
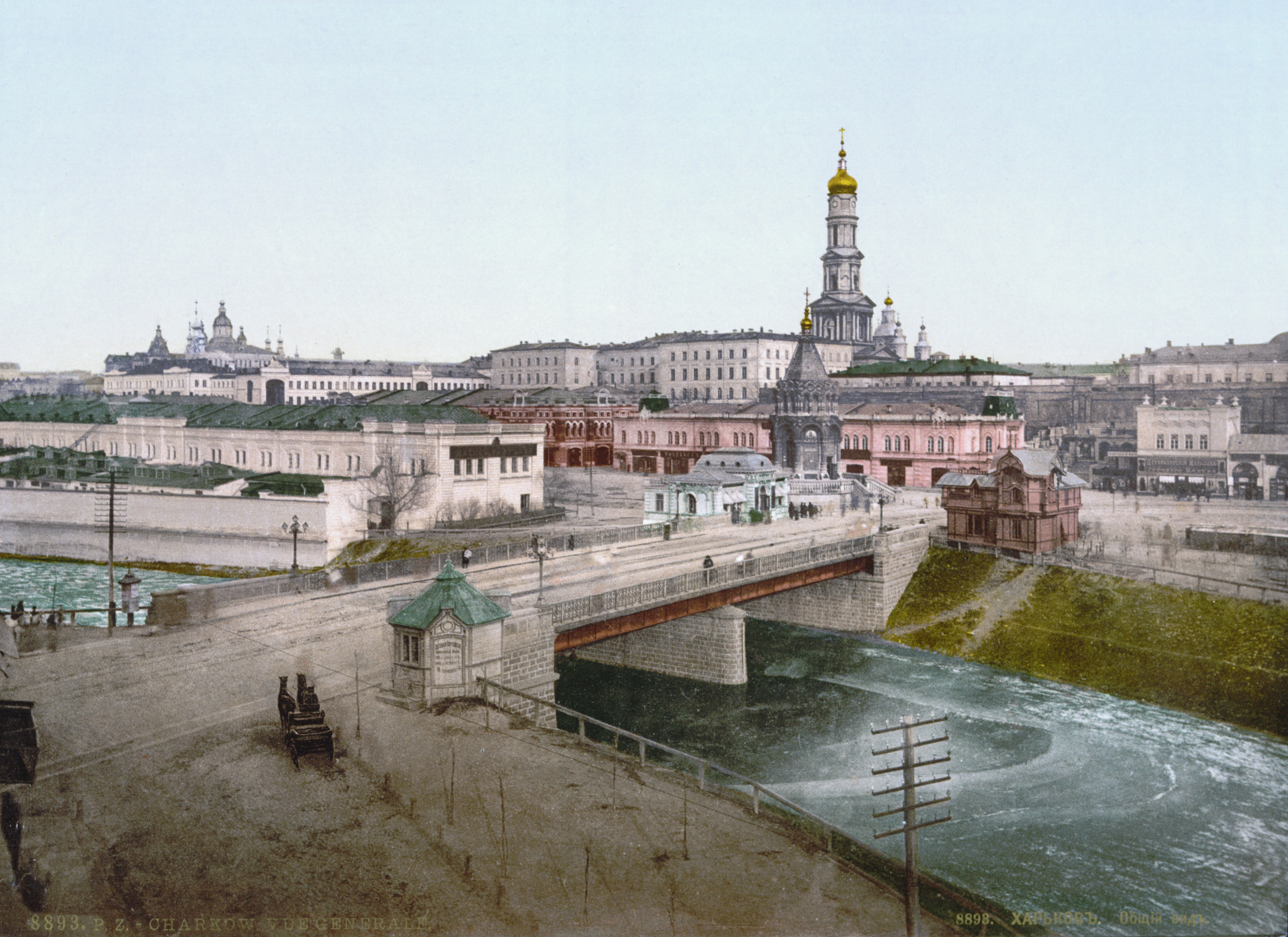
Maria Quisling lived in central Kharkiv and fondly remembered a stroll at the river when Vidkun walked her home from a party a summer night in 1923. Postcard c. 1900

Maria Quisling's birth was probably in November 1900 in Kharkiv in the then Russian Empire in Ukraine. A student's card says she was born in 1899. Information about her family is uncertain. She told her family-in-law that her father had been a higher civil servant.

She finished high school in 1918 and obtained a degree from Kharkiv Economic Institute in 1922. The same year she started working for a Ukrainian organization which co-ordinated the work of various foreign aid organizations in the area, including the Nansen aid. She met Vidkun for the first time in March 1923 and a romantic relationship developed during the summer that year, even though Vidkun had formally married Alexandra Voronin in August 1922. Historian Hans Fredrik Dahl believes Maria knew about the relationship with Alexandra and accepted his explanation that it was a pro-forma marriage to help Alexandra out of Russia.

According to Quisling, she and Vidkun were married at the Norwegian legation in Moscow on 10 September 1923. Historians believe this is wrong, as Norway did not formally recognize the new Soviet authorities before 1924, and the representative at the Norwegian Commerce office did not have the right to perform marriages and was not in Moscow on 10 September. If the couple had a civil marriage in Kharkiv, there has never been any documentation for it. Historian Hans Fredrik Dahl believes some kind of marriage took place in Kharkiv on that day, but he is unsure whether it happened in formally correct ways or was an informal ceremony. The same day as the marriage allegedly took place, Maria got a special passport for employees of Nansen Action. It was issued to "Mary Quisling".

Quisling left Soviet Russia on her own and arrived in Paris, where in late 1923 she was reunited with Vidkun and Alexandra, who had travelled together. They lived for a time at Hotel Studia in the Latin Quarter, though they travelled to Vienna and other places from November to January 1924.

In June 1924, Maria, Alexandra and Vidkun travelled to Norway and Maria was introduced to his family as his new wife and spent some time with Vidkun's parents in Telemark where she started to learn Norwegian. Alexandra, who Vidkun the year before had introduced as his wife, was now referred to as a child he took care of. Alexandra left Norway permanently later that summer. Quisling returned to France in 1926 where she met Alexandra again and had the company of other Russian immigrants. She lived in Normandy and in Paris where she attended courses at La Sorbonne for a while.

After Vidkun got a position in Moscow as legation secretary in charge of British Diplomatic affairs which was handled by Norway, she joined him there in November 1928. The couple lived for a time together with linguist Olaf Broch and his wife and later with diplomat Per Prebensen and his wife Ragnhild.

During 1928 and 1929, the Quislings bought numerous paintings and antiques, as well as silverware and furniture. Vidkun used his savings and an inheritance from his mother to pay for the purchases. According to Maria's later statements, her mother arrived in Moscow with a sum of money that was Quisling's inheritance from her father, though author Arve Juritzen has questioned whether the mother actually was in Moscow that year. She was at the time poor and relied on economic support from Vidkun.

In December 1929, the couple settled in Oslo, where in 1922 Vidkun had bought an apartment in Erling Skjalgssons gate 26 in Frogner. Most of the 200 paintings were placed in safe deposit boxes, as they proved difficult to sell for the prices Vidkun had expected. He had believed many of the paintings were by renowned painters, but they were mostly found to be copies.

== Involvement in Nasjonal Samling and the Quisling regime ==
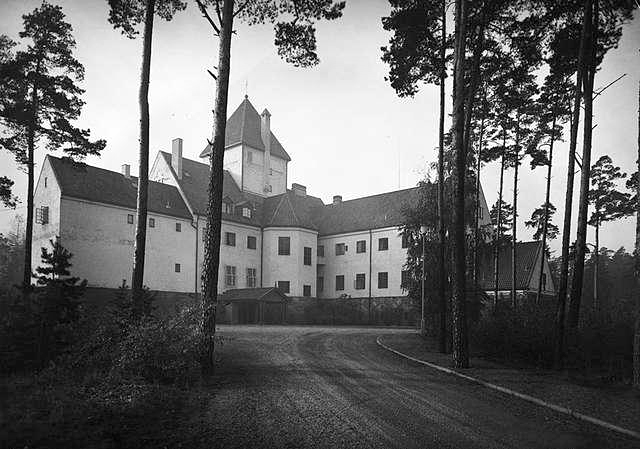
Villa Grande (Gimle) in 1945

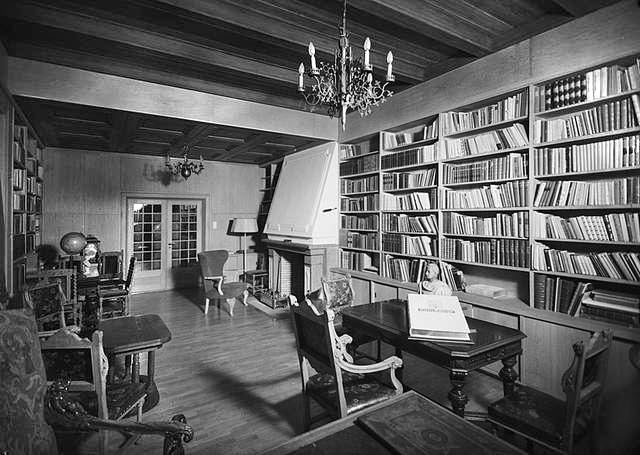
The library in Villa Grande included a Russian table which had belonged to the Russian Prime Minister Stolypin

When Nasjonal Samling (NS) was founded in 1933, Maria Quisling was registered as a member by Vidkun. She was lightly involved in the beginning but never had any political role. When Germany invaded Norway in 1940, Vidkun became leader of a pro-Nazi puppet regime.

In December 1941, Maria and Vidkun moved into Villa Grande, which Vidkun renamed Gimle for its significance in Norse mythology as a utopian place. Construction of the building had begun in 1917, but was left uncompleted until the collaborationist authorities designated it a residence for the Quisling couple in the beginning of 1941. Maria Quisling actively took part in the furnishing of the residence, which included Russian furniture and a large painting the couple had bought in Moscow. She also hired servants, 12 at the most, and regularly shopped at Steen & Strøm, Glasmagasinet and other places. During this time there was no clear line drawn between the couple's expenses and that of the state. When Vidkun was appointed Minister President on 1 February 1942, a large celebration took place at Villa Grande, with Maria Quisling as hostess. She hosted multiple other dinners and parties during the time the couple lived there.

When the occupation ended, Vidkun was arrested on 9 May. Quisling remained at Villa Grande until 15 May when she was ordered to leave. She then moved in with the widow of former Minister of Finance Frederik Prytz.

== Trial and execution of Vidkun ==
After Vidkun was arrested in May 1945, Maria was without contact with him for two months when they were given permission to correspond and in August she visited him for the first time in prison. While Maria wanted to testify, in the trial against Vidkun when it started in August, he did not allow her to. Instead Vidkun's lawyer read several statements from her in his defense. On 10 September, Vidkun was sentenced to death. His wife was deeply shocked and wrote letters of appeal to various authorities, including King Haakon, Prime Minister Einar Gerhardsen and Otto Ruge. She also drafted an appeal to Stalin, underlining Vidkun's efforts for Russia, but the letter was never sent. On 13 October, the Supreme Court of Norway upheld the conviction and no pardon was given. When Vidkun was informed on 23 October that his execution would take place that night, he wrote a last letter to her and included a lock of his hair which she kept. She was informed the next morning and together with a small group of people held a memorial service in her home. She was not given access to the urn with Vidkun's ashes which was kept at the police station.

== Police investigation and arrest ==
After Mrs. Prytz moved from Oslo, Maria Quisling was left without a place to live. The authorities gave her access to two rooms in Villa Maihaugen in Vinderen in Oslo which belonged to a man who was imprisoned for having cooperated with the German occupation government. Several other wives of the NS leadership got rooms in the same house, and Quisling and the others attracted negative reactions from neighbours and the press.

On 29 August 1945, Dagbladet had a headline saying "Why is Mrs. Quisling not in Prison?" In the article, the journalist wrote "Nobody has more supported the Germans and the Nazis than Mrs. Quisling and she benefited in all kind of ways during her man’s time in power. It’s misguided politeness to treat her milder than other traitors."

In February 1946, she was summoned for questioning at Victoria Terrasse. She was asked about her background, her activities in Nasjonal Samling and her life during the occupation. In March, the police searched her home. Working on a theory that Quisling in May 1945, had encouraged Vidkun to armed resistance, they arrested her on 31 May 1946. The prosecutors dropped the charges of encouraging armed resistance, but she was charged with having been a member of NS, for having represented the occupation regime in her position as Vidkun's wife, for having encouraged Vidkun to use public funds to decorate their homes, and for having received goods the occupation regime had confiscated from the royal palace.

On 17 June, she met in court for a preliminary hearing (forhørsretten) where she explained herself and denied all charges. The court was open for the public and attracted much attention.

She was released on 18 June 1946 as the court did not find grounds to keep her in custody. The investigation continued, but on 8 April 1948, Quisling was informed that all charges against her had been dropped.

Historian Hans Fredrik Dahl has questioned why she was not convicted of anything, particularly since she was a member of NS.

== Division of community property ==
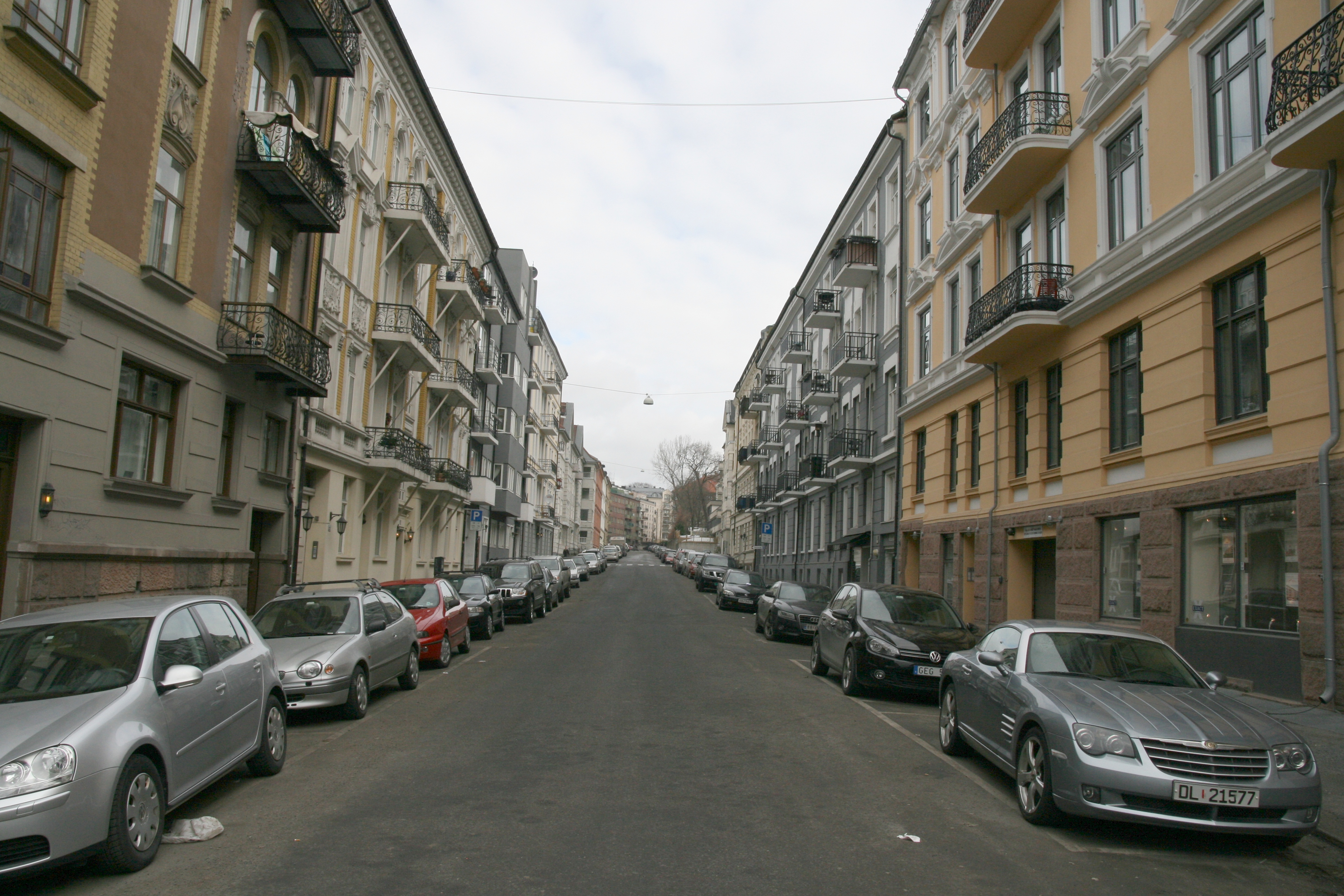
Erling Skjalgssons street; where Maria Quisling lived for most of her life in Norway

The division of Vidkun and Maria's joint spousal effects (Norwegian: fellesbo, shortened bo) was handled by the Erstatningsdirektorat (Compensation directorate). There were huge assets in the bo, but also great liabilities in the form of compensation claims related to Vidkun's actions during the occupation. Some of the claims were disputed. In May 1946, the bo sold the apartment in Erling Skjalgssons street for a smaller sum of money than Vidkun had paid in 1922. The bo also sold much of the home furniture; some of which Quisling claimed was hers and not Vidkun's.

Maria demanded as Quisling's wife to get half the value of the bo. The directorate did not accept this, but accepted that she should get back everything she had brought into it. She obtained many letters of support, including from Odd Nansen, a son of Fridtjof Nansen who had been imprisoned by the authorities during the occupation. In 1950, the Compensation directorate undid the sale of the apartment in Erling Skjalgssons street and she got it back. She continued to provide letters that were meant to document which things she had brought into the bo.

In 1952, Quisling got back all furniture and other items she claimed she had brought into the marriage as bo. A final settlement in 1955, gave her a further 75600 kr.

== Funeral of Vidkun Quisling ==
Maria Quisling asked to get the urn with Vidkun's ashes in 1946. This was declined. She again asked in 1956 after the Chief of Police in Oslo had asked the government permission to throw the ashes in the Oslofjord, but the government declined both requests. However, a new request by Quisling in 1959 was successful and the urn was brought to her home in June that year. Quisling, Vidkun's cousin Margarethe Langaard (Conken) and priest Asle Enger held a small ceremony in Quisling's home. On 30 June, the urn was buried in the grave site of the Quisling family at Gjerpen churchyard. The ceremony which included the local priest was small and secret, and there was no inscription with Vidkun's name.

== Later life, death and legacy ==
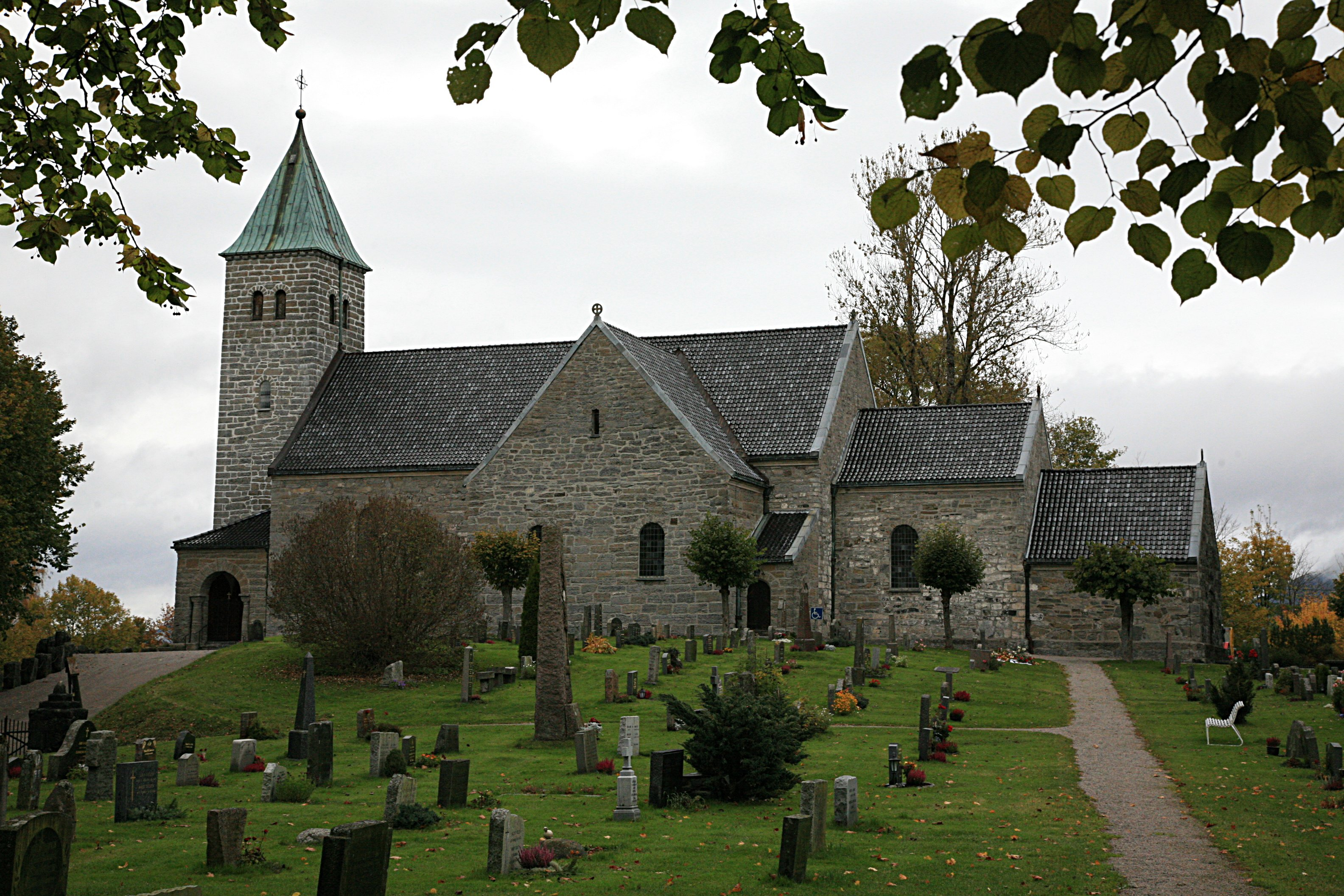
Vidkun and Maria Quisling are interred at Gjerpen churchyard

Quisling had all her life in Norway complained of various health issues and often spent time at recreation institutions. In the post-war years, her health deteriorated and she had frequent visits to physicians and psychologists. Her health problems included rheumatism, back problem, eye problems and depression. As she aged, she had signs of dementia. In 1977, she was long-term hospitalized at Ullevål hospital and in 1978 she was moved to a nursing home at Uranienborg where she lived until her death on 17 January 1980. She was buried in the Quisling family grave at Gjerpen Churchyard.

A member of the Russian Orthodox Church, Maria Quisling had a Christian faith. In the 1930s, she had contact with the Oxford Group. In her later years she was visited by a woman from Oslo Inner Mission Society and when she was hospitalized, she had regular visitors from the Catholic Church.

In 1976, she decided in her will that her assets after her death should fund an endowment, Vidkun og Maria Quisling's legat, later called Maria Quislings legat, which should be administered by Oslo Inner City Mission and each year give economic help to elderly people in dire economic situations. The basic capital is around 2.4 million kr. Money is distributed after applications before Christmas.

She bequeathed documents from Vidkun to the library of University of Oslo. The executor of Maria Quisling's will was Finn Thrana, a supreme court advocate and former Quisling regime official.

== Sources ==
- Dahl, Hans Fredrik (1991). En fører blir til. Oslo: Aschehoug. ISBN 8257409049.
- Dahl, Hans Fredrik (27 May 1999). Quisling: A Study in Treachery. Cambridge University Press. ISBN 978-0-521-49697-1.
- Juritzen, Arve (2008). Quisling privat. Oslo: Juritzen forlag. ISBN 9788282050272.
