= Guldbagge Award for Best Film =

Swedish film award

- Country: Sweden
- Presented by: Swedish Film Institute
- First award: 1964 (for films released during the 1963/1964 film season)
- Currently held by: Crossing (2024)
- Website: guldbaggen.se

The Guldbagge for Best Film is a Swedish film award presented annually by the Swedish Film Institute (SFI) as part of the Guldbagge Awards (Swedish: "Guldbaggen") to the best Swedish motion picture of the year.

== Winners and nominees ==
Each Guldbagge Awards ceremony is listed chronologically below along with the winner of the Guldbagge Award for Best Film and the producer associated with the award. Before 1991 the awards did not announce nominees, only winners. In the columns under the winner of each award are the other nominees for best film, which are listed from 1991 and forward.

For the first nineteen ceremonies, the eligibility period spanned two calendar years. For example, the 2nd Guldbagge Awards presented on 15 October 1965, recognized films that were released between July 1964 and June 1965. Starting with the 20th Guldbagge Awards, held in 1985, the period of eligibility became the full previous calendar year from 1 January to 31 December. The Awards presented at that ceremony were in respect of 18 months of film production owing to the changeover from the broken calendar year to the standard calendar year during 1984. Due to a mediocre film year, no awards ceremony was held in 1971.

Winners before the nomination system (1964–1990)
Winners under the nomination system (1991–present)

=== 1960s ===
Year	Film	Director(s)	Producer(s)	Ref.
1963/64 (1st)	The Silence	Ingmar Bergman	Allan Ekelund	
1964/65 (2nd)	Swedish Wedding Night	Åke Falck	Tore Sjöberg and Lorens Marmstedt	
1965/66 (3rd)	Heja Roland!	Bo Widerberg	—N/a	
1966/67 (4th)	Persona §	Ingmar Bergman	Ingmar Bergman	
1967/68 (5th)	Hugo and Josephine	Kjell Grede	Göran Lindgren	
1968/69 (6th)	The White Game	Grupp 13 (Note: Grupp 13 is a film collective consisting of Roy Andersson, Kalle Boman, Lena Ewert, Sven Fahlén, Staffan Hedqvist, Axel Rudorf-Lohmann, Lennart Malmer, Björn Öberg, Jörgen Persson, Ingela Romare, Inge Roos, Rudi Spee and Bo Widerberg.)	—N/a	
1969/70 (7th)	A Swedish Love Story	Roy Andersson	Ejnar Gunnerholm	(Note: This year's ceremony resulted in a tie between two films.)
1969/70 (7th)	Mistreatment	Lars Lennart Forsberg	—N/a	(Note: This year's ceremony resulted in a tie between two films.)

=== 1970s ===
Year	Film	Director(s)	Producer(s)	Ref.
1970/71	The Emigrants	Jan Troell	Bengt Forslund	
1971/72 (8th)	The Apple War	Tage Danielsson	—N/a	
1972/73 (9th)	Cries and Whispers	Ingmar Bergman	Lars-Owe Carlberg	
1973/74 (10th)	A Handful of Love	Vilgot Sjöman	Bengt Forslund	
1974/75 (11th)	The Last Adventure	Jan Halldoff	Hasse Seiden	
1975/76 (12th)	Release the Prisoners to Spring	Tage Danielsson	—N/a	
1976/77 (13th)	The Man on the Roof	Bo Widerberg	Per Berglund	
1977/78 (14th)	The Adventures of Picasso	Tage Danielsson	Staffan Hedqvist	
1978/79 (15th)	A Respectable Life	Stefan Jarl	Stefan Jarl	
1979/80 (16th)	To Be a Millionaire	Mats Arehn	Olle Hellbom	

=== 1980s ===
Year	Film	Director(s)	Producer(s)	Ref.
1980/81 (17th)	Children's Island	Kay Pollak	Bengt Forslund	
1981/82 (18th)	The Simple-Minded Murderer	Hans Alfredson	—N/a	
1982/83 (19th)	Fanny and Alexander	Ingmar Bergman	Jörn Donner	
1984 (20th)	Beyond Sorrow, Beyond Pain	Agneta Elers-Jarleman	—N/a	
1985 (21st)	My Life as a Dog	Lasse Hallström	Waldemar Bergendahl	
1986 (22nd)	The Sacrifice	Andrei Tarkovsky	Anna-Lena Wibom	
1987 (23rd)	Pelle the Conqueror	Bille August	Per Holst	
1988 (24th)	Katinka	Max von Sydow	Bo Christensen and Katinka Faragó	
1988 (24th)	Back to Ararat	Jim Downing, Göran Gunér, Per-Åke Holmquist and Suzanne Khardalian	PeÅ Holmquist	
1989 (25th)	The Miracle in Valby	Åke Sandgren	Bo Christensen	

=== 1990s ===
Year	Film	Director(s)	Producer(s)	Ref.
1990 (26th)	Good Evening, Mr. Wallenberg	Kjell Grede	Katinka Faragó	
1991 (27th)	Il Capitano: A Swedish Requiem	Jan Troell	Göran Setterberg	
1991 (27th)	Agnes Cecilia – en sällsam historia	Anders Grönros	Ingrid Dalunde and Waldemar Bergendahl	
1991 (27th)	Underground Secrets	Clas Lindberg	Lennart Dunér	
1992 (28th)	House of Angels	Colin Nutley	Lars Jönsson and Lars Dahlquist	
1992 (28th)	Night of the Orangutan	Kjell-Åke Andersson	Anders Granström and Bert Sundberg	
1992 (28th)	The Best Intentions	Bille August	Ingrid Dahlberg	
1993 (29th)	The Slingshot	Åke Sandgren	Waldemar Bergendahl	
1993 (29th)	The Man on the Balcony	Daniel Alfredson	Hans Lönnerheden	
1993 (29th)	The Ferris Wheel	Clas Lindberg	Lennart Dunér	
1994 (30th)	A Pizza in Jordbro	Rainer Hartleb	Rainer Hartleb	
1994 (30th)	Kalle och änglarna	Ole Bjørn Salvesen	Anders Birkeland	
1994 (30th)	The Daughter of the Puma	Ulf Hultberg and Åsa Faringer	Peter Ringgaard	
1995 (31st)	All Things Fair	Bo Widerberg	Per Holst	
1995 (31st)	One in a Million	Måns Herngren and Hannes Holm	Waldemar Bergendahl	
1995 (31st)	Like It Never Was Before	Susanne Bier	Stefan Baron	
1996 (32nd)	Hamsun	Jan Troell	Erik Crone	
1996 (32nd)	The Hunters	Kjell Sundvall	Joakim Hansson and Björn Carlström	
1996 (32nd)	Christmas Oratorio	Kjell-Åke Andersson	Dorothee Pinfold	
1997 (33rd)	Tic Tac	Daniel Alfredson	Katinka Faragó	
1997 (33rd)	Adam & Eva	Måns Herngren and Hannes Holm	Waldemar Bergendahl	
1997 (33rd)	Run for Your Life	Richard Hobert	Göran Lindström and Bengt Linné	
1998 (34th)	Show Me Love	Lukas Moodysson	Lars Jönsson	
1998 (34th)	Liv till varje pris	Stefan Jarl	Stefan Jarl	
1998 (34th)	Waiting for the Tenor	Lisa Ohlin	Anna Eriksson	
1999 (35th)	Tsatsiki, morsan och polisen	Ella Lemhagen	Anne Ingvar	
1999 (35th)	Zero Tolerance	Anders Nilsson	Björn Carlström and Joakim Hansson	
1999 (35th)	Tiden är en dröm	Jan Lindqvist	Klas Olofsson, Ingrid Edström and Anna-Lena Wibom	

=== 2000s ===
Year	Film	Director(s)	Producer(s)	Ref.
2000 (36th)	Songs from the Second Floor	Roy Andersson	Lisa Alwert, Roy Andersson, Philippe Bober, Sanne Glæsel and Johan Mardell	
2000 (36th)	Jalla! Jalla!	Josef Fares	Anna Anthony	
2000 (36th)	Wings of Glass	Reza Bagher	Peter Kropenin	
2001 (37th)	As White as in Snow	Jan Troell	Lars Hermann, Kerstin Bonnier, Erik Crone and Johan Mardell	
2001 (37th)	Days Like This	Mikael Håfström	Anna Anthony	
2001 (37th)	A Song for Martin	Bille August	Bille August, Lars Kolvig, Michael Lundberg and Michael Obel	
2002 (38th)	Lilya 4-ever	Lukas Moodysson	Lars Jönsson	
2002 (38th)	Everyone Loves Alice	Richard Hobert	Peter Possne	
2002 (38th)	The Guy in the Grave Next Door	Kjell Sundvall	Börje Hansson and Charlotta Denward	
2003 (39th)	Evil	Mikael Håfström	Ingemar Leijonborg and Hans Lönnerheden	
2003 (39th)	Elina: As If I Wasn't There	Klaus Härö	Melanie Backer, David Leitner and Michael Yanko	
2003 (39th)	Daybreak	Björn Runge	Claes Gunnarsson	
2004 (40th)	Dalecarlians	Maria Blom	Lars Jönsson	
2004 (40th)	Four Shades of Brown	Tomas Alfredson	Caisa Westling	
2004 (40th)	As It Is in Heaven	Kay Pollak	Anders Birkeland and Göran Lindström	
2005 (41st)	Nina's Journey	Lena Einhorn	Kaska Krosny	
2005 (41st)	Mouth to Mouth	Björn Runge	Clas Gunnarsson	
2005 (41st)	Zozo	Josef Fares	Anna Anthony	
2006 (42nd)	Kidz in da Hood	Catti Edfeldt and Ylva Gustavsson	Peter Holthausen and Pontus Sjöman	
2006 (42nd)	Falkenberg Farewell	Jesper Ganslandt	Anna Anthony	
2006 (42nd)	Storm	Björn Stein and Måns Mårlind	Karl Fredrik Ulfung	
2007 (43rd)	You, the Living	Roy Andersson	Pernilla Sandström	
2007 (43rd)	Darling	Johan Kling	Fredrik Heinig	
2007 (43rd)	Leo	Josef Fares	Anna Anthony	
2008 (44th)	Everlasting Moments	Jan Troell	Thomas Stenderup	
2008 (44th)	Involuntary	Ruben Östlund	Erik Hemmendorff	
2008 (44th)	Let the Right One In	Tomas Alfredson	John Nordling and Carl Molinder	
2009 (45th)	The Girl with the Dragon Tattoo	Niels Arden Oplev	Søren Stærmose	
2009 (45th)	Starring Maja	Teresa Fabik	Sandra Harms	
2009 (45th)	Glowing Stars	Lisa Siwe	Anders Landström	

=== 2010s ===
Year	Film	Director(s)	Producer(s)	Ref.
2010 (46th)	Sebbe	Babak Najafi	Rebecka Lafrenz and Mimmi Spång	
2010 (46th)	Simple Simon	Andreas Öhman	Bonnie Skoog Feeney and Jonathan Sjöberg	
2010 (46th)	Beyond	Pernilla August	Helena Danilesson and Ralf Karlsson	
2011 (47th)	She Monkeys	Lisa Aschan	Helene Lindholm	
2011 (47th)	Simon and the Oaks	Lisa Ohlin	Christer Nilson and Per Holst	
2011 (47th)	Play	Ruben Östlund	Erik Hemmendorff	
2012 (48th)	Eat Sleep Die	Gabriela Pichler	China Åhlander	
2012 (48th)	Call Girl	Mikael Marcimain	Mimmi Spång	
2012 (48th)	Searching for Sugar Man	Malik Bendjelloul	Malik Bendjelloul and Simon Chinn	
2013 (49th)	The Reunion	Anna Odell	Mathilde Dedye	
2013 (49th)	Shed No Tears	Måns Mårlind and Björn Stein	Malcolm Lidbeck and David Olsson	
2013 (49th)	Waltz for Monica	Per Fly	Lena Rehnberg	
2014 (50th)	Force Majeure	Ruben Östlund	Erik Hemmendorff and Marie Kjellson	
2014 (50th)	A Pigeon Sat on a Branch Reflecting on Existence	Roy Andersson	Linn Kirkenær, Pernilla Sandström and Håkon Øverås	
2014 (50th)	Gentlemen	Mikael Marcimain	Fredrik Heinig, Johannes Åhlund and Mattias Nohrborg	
2015 (51st)	The Here After	Magnus von Horn	Madeleine Ekman	
2015 (51st)	A Man Called Ove	Hannes Holm	Annica Bellander and Niklas Wikström Nicastro	
2015 (51st)	My Skinny Sister	Sanna Lenken	Annika Rogell	
2016 (52nd)	The Giant	Johannes Nyholm	Maria Dahlin and Morten Kjems Hytten Juhl	
2016 (52nd)	The 101-Year-Old Man Who Skipped Out on the Bill and Disappeared	Felix Herngren and Måns Herngren	Malte Forssell	
2016 (52nd)	My Aunt in Sarajevo	Goran Kapetanović	China Åhlander	
2016 (52nd)	Fragility	Ahang Bashi	David Herdies	
2016 (52nd)	The Garbage Helicopter	Jonas Selberg Augustsén	Andreas Emanuelsson	
2017 (53rd)	The Nile Hilton Incident	Tarik Saleh	Kristina Åberg	
2017 (53rd)	Borg McEnroe	Janus Metz Pedersen	Jon Nohrstedt and Fredrik Wikström Nicastro	
2017 (53rd)	Ravens	Jens Assur	Jan Marnell, Tom Persson and Jens Assur	
2017 (53rd)	Sami Blood	Amanda Kernell	Lars G. Lindström	
2017 (53rd)	The Square	Ruben Östlund	Erik Hemmendorff and Philippe Bober	
2018 (54th)	Border	Ali Abbasi	Nina Bisgaard, Piodor Gustafsson and Petra Jönsson	
2018 (54th)	The Deminer	Hogir Hirori and Shinwar Kamal	Antonio Russo Merenda and Hogir Hirori	
2018 (54th)	Den blomstertid nu kommer	Crazy Pictures	Crazy Pictures	
2018 (54th)	Goliath	Peter Grönlund	Mattias Nohrborg and Frida Bargo	
2018 (54th)	Becoming Astrid	Pernille Fischer Christensen	Lars G Lindström, Maria Dahlin and Anna Anthony	
2019 (55th)	And Then We Danced	Levan Akin	Mathilde Dedye	
2019 (55th)	438 Days	Jesper Ganslandt	Sandra Harms and Karl Fredrik Ulfung	
2019 (55th)	About Endlessness	Roy Andersson	Pernilla Sandström	
2019 (55th)	Sune - Best Man	Jon Holmberg	Linus Stöhr Torell and Malin Söderlund	
2019 (55th)	Transnistra	Anna Eborn	Katja Adomeit, David Herdies, Michael Krotkiewski and Hanne Phlypo	

=== 2020s ===
Year	Film	Director(s)	Producer(s)	Ref.
2020 (56th)	Spring Uje spring	Henrik Schyffert	Anna-Klara Carlsten and Tomas Michaelsson	
2020 (56th)	Charter	Amanda Kernell	Lars G, Lindström and Eva Åkergren	
2020 (56th)	Greta	Nathan Grossman	Cecilia Nessen and Fredrik Heinig	
2020 (56th)	Orca	Josephine Bornebusch	Sofie Palage	
2020 (56th)	Scheme Birds	Ellen Fiske and Ellinor Hallin	Mario Adamson and Ruth Reid	
2021 (57th)	Clara Sola	Nathalie Álvarez Mesén	Nima Yousefi	
2021 (57th)	Pleasure	Ninja Thyberg	Erik Hemmendorff, Eliza Jones and Markus Waltå	
2021 (57th)	Tigers	Ronnie Sandahl	Piodor Gustafsson	
2021 (57th)	Utvandrarna	Erik Poppe	Fredrik Wikström Nicastro	
2021 (57th)	The Most Beautiful Boy in the World	Stina Gardell	Stina Gardell	
2022 (58th)
2022 (58th)	Triangle of Sadness	Ruben Östlund	Erik Hemmendorff and Philippe Bober	
2022 (58th)	Boy from Heaven	Tarik Saleh	Kristina Åberg and Fredrik Zander	
2022 (58th)	Comedy Queen	Sanna Lenken	Anna Anthony and Rebecka Lafrenz	
2022 (58th)	Historjá – Stygn för Sápmi	Thomas Jackson	Pelle Nilsson and Mattias Nohrborg	
2022 (58th)	I Am Zlatan	Jens Sjögren	Fredrik Heinig, Frida Bargo and Mattias Nohrborg	
2023 (59th)
2023 (59th)	Paradise Is Burning	Mika Gustafson	Nima Yousefi	
2023 (59th)	100 Seasons	Giovanni Bucchieri	Daniel Oliva Andersson and Isabella Rodriguez	
2023 (59th)	The Gullspång Miracle	Maria Fredriksson	Ina Holmqvist	
2023 (59th)	Hammarskjöld	Per Fly	Patrick Ryborn	
2023 (59th)	Opponent	Milad Alami	Annika Rogell	
2024 (60th)
2024 (60th)	Crossing	Levan Akin	Mathilde Dedye	
2024 (60th)	G-21 Scenes from Gottsunda	Loran Batti	Göran Hugo Olsson and Melissa Lindgren	
2024 (60th)	The Hypnosis	Ernst De Geer	Mimmi Spång	
2024 (60th)	The Last Journey	Filip Hammar and Fredrik Wikingsson	Lars Beckung and Petra Måhl	
2024 (60th)	The Swedish Torpedo	Frida Kempff	David Herdies, Erik Andersson, and Michael Krotkiewski	
2025 (61st)
2025 (61st)	Eagles of the Republic	Tarik Saleh	Linus Stöhr Torell, Linda Mutawi, Johan Lindström, and Alexandre Mallet-Guy	
2025 (61st)	7 Steps	Andreas Öhmann	Eliza Jones and Markus Waltå	
2025 (61st)	Egghead Republic	Pella Kågerman, and Hugo Lilja	Nina Lund, Pella Kågerman, and Hugo Lilja	
2025 (61st)	Kevlar Soul	Maria Eriksson-Hecht	Ronny Fritsche and Lizette Jonjic	
2025 (61st)	Live a Little	Fanny Ovesen	Marie Kjellson	

== See also ==
- Academy Award for Best Picture
- BAFTA Award for Best Film
- Golden Globe Award for Best Motion Picture – Drama
- Golden Globe Award for Best Motion Picture – Musical or Comedy
- Screen Actors Guild Award for Outstanding Performance by a Cast in a Motion Picture
- Academy Award for Best Foreign Language Film (List of Academy Award winners and nominees for Best Foreign Language Film)
- Golden Globe Award for Best Foreign Language Film
