= 61st Guldbagge Awards =

2026 Swedish film awards

- Date: 19 January 2026
- Site: Cirkus, Stockholm, Sweden
- Hosted by: Shima Niavarani

Highlights
- Most awards: Eagles of the Republic (6)
- Most nominations: Eagles of the Republic (11)

Television coverage
- Network: SVT

The 61st Guldbagge Awards ceremony, presented by the Swedish Film Institute, honoring the best Swedish films of 2025, took place on 19 January 2026 at Cirkus, Stockholm. Actress Shima Niavarani hosted the ceremony for the third year in a row.

Political thriller film Eagles of the Republic won the most awards with six, including Best Film. Drama films Kevlar Soul and Raptures each won two awards.

== Nominations ==
The nominations were announced on 11 December 2025 at Filmhuset, Stockholm. Political thriller film Eagles of the Republic led the nominations with eleven, followed by drama film Raptures and romantic drama 7 Steps with eight.

Winners are listed first, highlighted in boldface, and indicated with a double dagger (‡).

**Best Film**: **Eagles of the Republic – Linus Stöhr Torell, Linda Mutawi, Johan Lindström, and Alexandre Mallet-Guy**‡; 7 Steps – Eliza Jones and Markus Waltå; Egghead Republic – Nina Lund, Pella Kågerman, and Hugo Lilja; Kevlar Soul – Ronny Fritsche and Lizette Jonjic; Live a Little – Marie Kjellson	**Best Director**: **Maria Eriksson-Hecht – Kevlar Soul**‡; Andreas Öhman – 7 Steps; Fanny Ovesen – Live a Little; Tarik Saleh – Eagles of the Republic
**Best Actress in a Leading Role**: **Jessica Grabowsky – Raptures as Rakel**‡; Embla Ingelman-Sundberg – Live a Little as Laura; Veronica Maggio – 7 Steps as Elle; Ella Rae Rappaport – Egghead Republic as Sonja Schmidt	**Best Actor in a Leading Role**: **Fares Fares – Eagles of the Republic as George Fahmy**‡; Jakob Öhrman – Raptures as Teodor; Josef Kersh – Kevlar Soul as Alex; Joel Spira – 7 Steps as Josef
**Best Actress in a Supporting Role**: **Anki Lidén – The Home as Monika**‡; Elina Knihtilä – Raptures as Tyra Viola; Jessica Liedberg – Little Did I Know as Marianne; Liv Mjönes – 7 Steps as Sandra	**Best Actor in a Supporting Role**: **Torkel Petersson – Kevlar Soul as Bo**‡; Arvin Kananian – Egghead Republic as Turan Hiram; Jonay Pineda Skallak – Kevlar Soul as Dennis; Matias Varela – The Dance Club as Markus
**Best Screenplay**: **Eagles of the Republic – Tarik Saleh**‡; 7 Steps – Veronica Maggio and Andreas Öhman; Kevlar Soul – Pelle Rådström; Live a Little – Fanny Ovesen	**Best Cinematography**: **7 Steps – Josephine Owe**‡; The Dog – Andrew Mungai and Baker Karim; Eagles of the Republic – Pierre Aïm
**Best Editing**: **The Dialogue Police – Stefan Sundlöf and Magnus Svensson**‡; Håkan Bråkan 003 – Emil Stenberg; Kevlar Soul – Mervi Junkkonen and Robert Krantz	**Best Costume Design**: **Eagles of the Republic – Virginie Montel**‡; 7 Steps – Eva Torsvall; Raptures – Viktoria Mattila
**Best Sound Design**: **The Dog – Ulrika Akander, Tove Lidman, and Therese Gylfe**‡; Eagles of the Republic – Hans Møller; Trans Memoria – Arno Ledoux	**Best Makeup and Hair**: **Eagles of the Republic – Saara Räisänen**‡; Egghead Republic – Tuija Valén; Raptures – Saara Räisänen
**Best Original Score**: **Raptures – Rebekka Karijord**‡; The Dog – Jens Lindgård and Petter Lindgård; Eagles of the Republic – Alexandre Desplat	**Best Production Design**: **Egghead Republic – Petra Kågerman**‡; Eagles of the Republic – Roger Rosenberg; Raptures – Vilja Katramo and Okku Rahikainen
**Best Visual Effects**: **Eagles of the Republic – Peter Hjort, Anders Nyman, Per Nyman, and Mikael Windelin**‡; The Crown Prince and the Return of The Tyrant – Love Fagerstedt, Anders Nyman, and Per Nyman; Raptures – Anders Nyman and Christian Olander	**Best Documentary Feature**: **Trans Memoria – Victoria Verseau**‡; Being Bo Widerberg (I huvudet på Bo) – Jon Asp and Mattias Nohrborg; Hacking Hate – Simon Klose; Ultras – Ragnhild Ekner
**Best Short Film**: **Dancing Pigeons – Christofer Nilsson**‡; Family – Clara Vida; Fear Fokol – Tuva Björk; Without Kelly – Lovisa Sirén	**Audience Award**: **Filmen om Siw – Stina Gardell**‡; Bert sabbar allt – Manuel Concha; Gröna linjen – Andreas Bjunér
**Newcomer Award**: **Rio Svensson**	**Gullspiran**: **Jessika Jankert**
**Honorary Award**: **Ylva Swedenborg**

=== Films with multiple nominations ===
Films with multiple nominations
Nominations	Film
11	Eagles of the Republic
8	7 Steps
8	Raptures
7	Kevlar Soul
5	Egghead Republic
4	Live a Little
3	The Dog
2	Trans Memoria

Films with multiple wins
Awards	Film
6	Eagles of the Republic
2	Kevlar Soul
2	Raptures
