= 46th Guldbagge Awards =

Swedish awards ceremony

- Date: 24 January 2011
- Site: Cirkus, Stockholm
- Hosted by: Petra Mede

Highlights
- Best Picture: Sebbe
- Most awards: Beyond & Easy Money (2)
- Most nominations: Beyond (9)

Television coverage
- Network: SVT

The 46th Guldbagge Awards ceremony, presented by the Swedish Film Institute, honored the best Swedish films of 2010 and took place January 24, 2011, at Cirkus in Stockholm. The jury presented Guldbagge Awards (commonly referred to as Bagge) in 15 categories. It was televised in the Sweden by SVT, with actress and comedian Petra Mede as host.

Beyond won awards for Best Director and Best Supporting Actress. Easy Money won for Best Actor and Best Cinematography. Sebbe directed by Babak Najafi, received Best Film.

== Winner and nominees ==
=== Awards ===
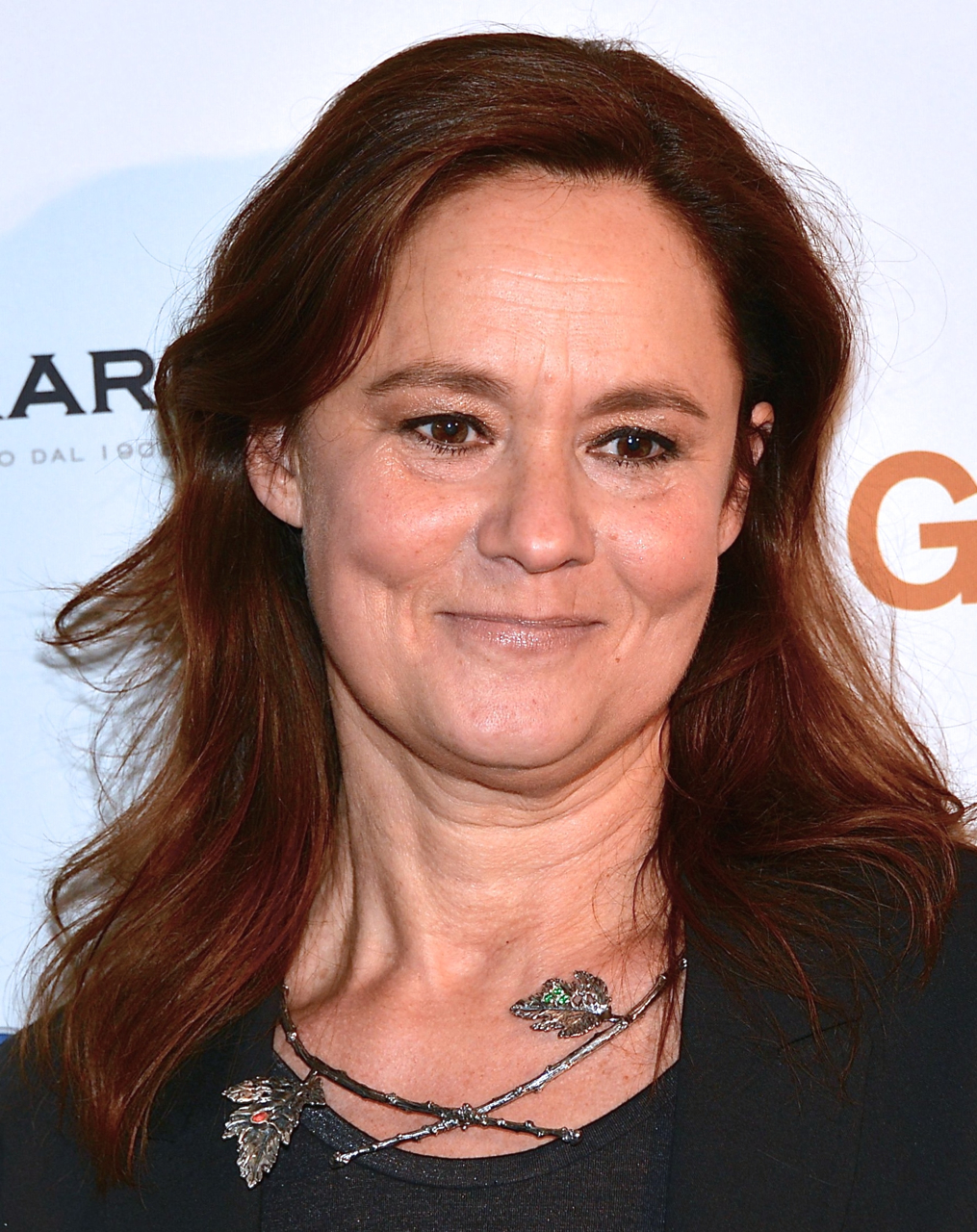
Pernilla August, Best Director winner

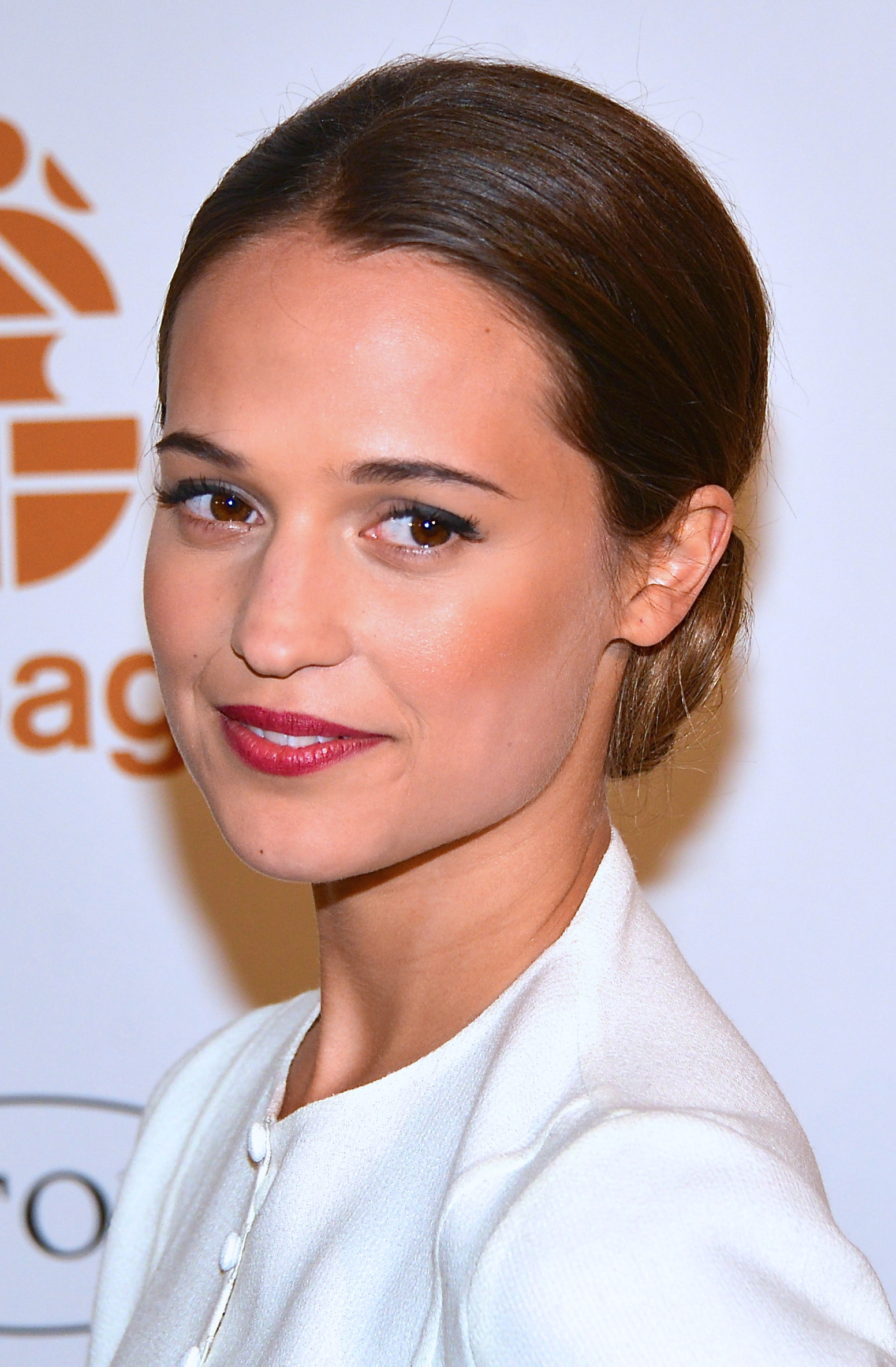
Alicia Vikander, Best Actress winner

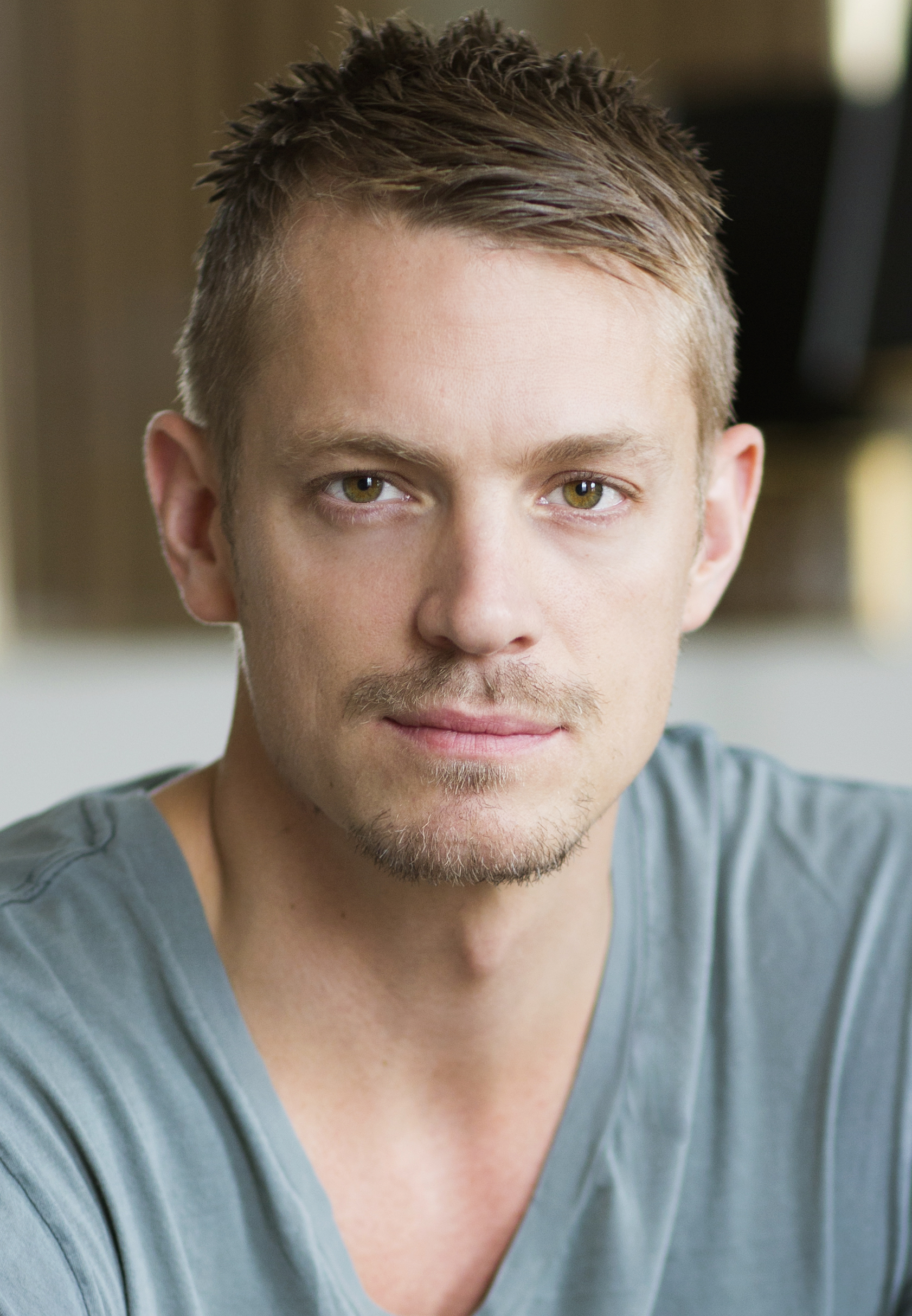
Joel Kinnaman, Best Actor winner

Best Film: Sebbe – Rebecka Lafrenz and Mimmi Spång; Beyond – Helena Danilesson and Ralf Karlsson; Simple Simon – Bonnie Skoog Feeney and Jonathan Sjöberg	Best Director: Pernilla August – Beyond; Lisa Langseth – Pure; Babak Najafi – Sebbe
Best Actress in a leading role: Alicia Vikander – Pure; Pernilla August – Miss Kicki; Noomi Rapace – Beyond	Best Actor in a leading role: Joel Kinnaman – Easy Money; Sebastian Hiort af Ornäs – Sebbe; Bill Skarsgård – Simple Simon
Best Supporting Actress: Outi Mäenpää – Beyond; Tehilla Blad – Beyond; Cecilia Forss – Simple Simon	Best Supporting Actor: Peter Dalle – Behind Blue Skies; David Dencik – Cornelis; Ville Virtanen – Beyond
Best Screenplay: Lisa Langseth – Pure; Andreas Öhman and Jonathan Sjöberg – Simple Simon; Pernilla August and Lolita Ray – Beyond	Best Cinematography: Aril Wretblad – Easy Money; Göran Hallberg – Behind Blue Skies; Erik Molberg Hansen – Beyond
Best Documentary Feature: Regretters – Marcus Lindeen; Kiss Bill – Emelie Wallgren and Ina Holmqvist; Familia – Mikael Wiström and Alberto Herskovits	Best Shortfilm: Tussilago – Jonas Odell; Tord and Tord – Niki Lindroth von Bahr; Not Panic – Elisabeth Marjanović Cronvall
Best Foreign Film: (Austria) (Germany) (France) Lourdes – Jessica Hausner; (United States) The Social Network – David Fincher; (France) (Netherlands) Fish Tank – Andrea Arnold	Honorary Award: Mona Malm, actress
Gullspiran: Lisbet Gabrielsson, producer of animated films.	Cinema Audience Award: House of Angels – Third Time Lucky; Balls; Easy Money
Best Achievement: Åsa Mossberg, film editor, for her work on Beyond; Jeanette Klintberg, casting director, for her work Easy Money; Musician Magnus Börjeson and the directors Johannes Stjärne Nilsson and Ola Simonsson for their work on Sound of Noise

== Multiple nominations and awards ==
Among the films that were released in Sweden in 2010, eighteen of them got at least one nomination.

The following films received one or multiple nominations:

- Nine: Beyond
- Four: Simple Simon, Easy Money
- Three: Sebbe, Pure
- Two: Behind Blue Skies

The following four films received multiple awards:

- Two: Beyond and Easy Money

== See also ==
- 83rd Academy Awards
- 68th Golden Globe Awards
- 64th British Academy Film Awards
- 17th Screen Actors Guild Awards
- 16th Critics' Choice Awards
- 31st Golden Raspberry Awards
