= Donia Massoud =

Egyptian actress and singer

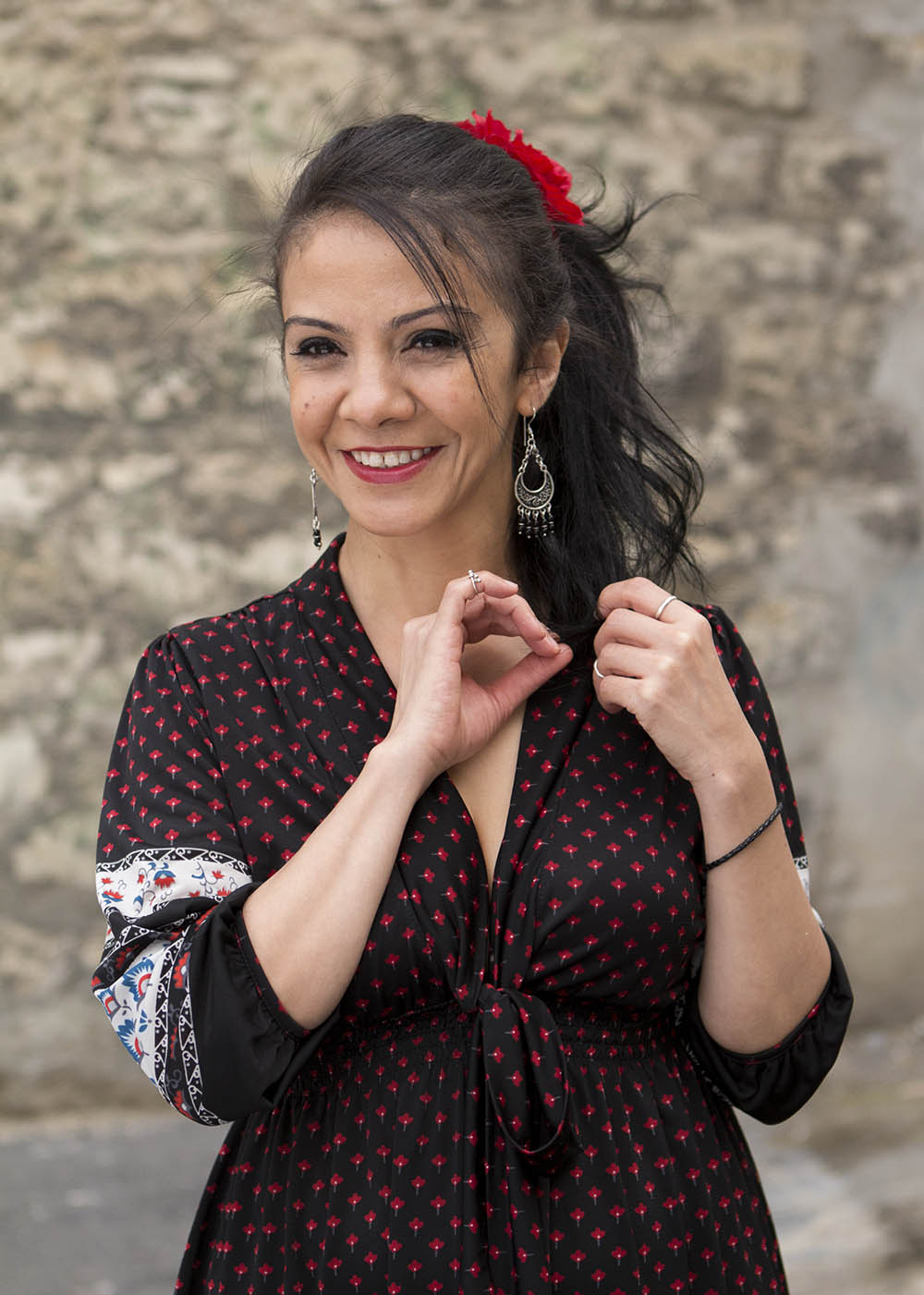
- Born: 3 August 1975 (age 51); Alexandria, Egypt
- Occupations: Actress, singer
- Website: https://doniamassoud.com/

Donia Massoud (Arabic: دنيا مسعود; born 3 August 1975) is an Egyptian actress and singer.

== Biography ==
Born and raised in Alexandria, Massoud moved to Cairo at the age of 19, to the chagrin of her parents. Discovering the stage and theater in Cairo, she embarked on careers as a singer and actress.

During the early 2000s, Massoud spent three years travelling through Egypt, collecting folk tales and music. She made recordings of traditional songs and gained access to village weddings and festivals. She was surprised that much of the music dealt with the experiences of women, characterizing many songs as almost bawdy. Massoud released a limited-run album in 2009, Mahatet Masr, and her most popular song "Betnadeeny Tany Leeh" questions why an old boyfriend is calling her since she found a new lover. She toured performing the music in Africa, Europe, and Asia, playing traditional instruments as well as singing.

In addition to her music, Massoud joined the theater group Al-Warsha. She considers music to be a similar art form to the dramatic arts. Her stage presence has been compared to that of Soad Hosny. Massoud has starred in several films and television series in Egypt and Sweden, in both Arabic and English. Her roles include the films Galteny Mogremen (2006), In the Heliopolis Flat (2007) and Genenet al asmak (2008).

In 2015, Massoud drew controversy for a tattoo on her back that read, "My heart’s feud is with God."

Since 2013, she has lived in Paris and continues to present her music project. She recently performed at the Arab World Institute (IMA) in Paris and at the Shoman Festival in Amman, Jordan.

In 2022, she portrayed the role of Scheherazade in Shall I Compare You to a Summer Day?.

She plays George's wife in Tarik Saleh's film The Eagles of the Republic. The film will have its world premiere in May 2025 at the Cannes Film Festival, where it will be screened in competition for the Palme d'Or. The film was scheduled for release on September 5, 2025.

== Filmography ==
Films

- 2002 : Khalli Eldemagh Sahi
- 2006 : Galteny Mogremen
- 2007 : In the Heliopolis Flat
- 2008 : Genenet al asmak
- 2011 : Blue Dive
- 2022 : Shall I Compare You to a Summer Day?
- 2025 : The Eagles of the Republic

Television

- 2005 : Alb Habiba
- 2007 : Hanan w Haneen
- 2008 : Eleiada
- 2008 : Sharif we Nos
- 2009 : Majnoun Laila
- 2010 : Ahl Cairo
- 2011 : Matt Nam Sabboba Massreya
