= Live a Little =

Live a Little may refer to:

- Live a Little (Pernice Brothers album)
- Live a Little (Big Kenny album)
- "Live a Little" (song), a song by Kenny Chesney from the album Hemingway's Whiskey
- "Live a Little", song by Dean Alexander
- "Live a Little", song by Kylie Minogue from Golden
- Live a Little (film), a 2025 film by Fanny Ovesen
- Live a Little, Love a Little, a musical film starring Elvis Presley
