= Husam Chadat =

Syrian-German actor and director (born 1966)

- Born: 15 May 1966 (age 60); Damascus, Syria
- Citizenship: Syria; Germany
- Occupations: actor; director; voice actor
- Years active: 1987–present

Husam Chadat (born 15 May 1966) is a Syrian and German actor and director.

== Career ==
Chadat was born in Damascus, Syria, on 15 May 1966. After graduating from Damascus University, he worked in the Syrian capital as a civil engineer before joining the theatre academy there to study acting in 1987. In the 1990s, Chadat appeared on Syrian television and starred in the national theatre scene. He emigrated to Germany to pursue a career as a director, joining the University of Television and Film Munich, from where he graduated in 2003. While studying in Germany, Chadat received a scholarship from the German Academic Exchange Service, taking further studies in theatre and film production.

His works include documentaries and short films, including a documentary about German film producer and screenwriter Bernd Eichinger. Chadat's productions were broadcast at the Hof International Film Festival and the Filmfest München, among other festivals, which helped him earn a greater audience and become well-known as an actor. In the early 2000s, Chadat joined Constantin Film and worked with actress Anke Engelke at ARD-Morgenmagazin, covering the Berlin International Film Festival.

Chadat has also worked as a voice actor, dubbing characters from German into Arabic, including the play Der Theatermacher by Austrian playwright Thomas Bernhard. Other of his ventures included working for ProSieben and Discovery Channel's Arabic version. In German television, Chadat participated in Tatort, Der Lehrer, and Notruf Hafenkante.

He has been featured in international cinema too, playing roles of different importance in films like Rock the Kasbah (2015), 13 Hours: The Secret Soldiers of Benghazi (2016), and Insyriated (2017). More recently, Chadat starred in the films Eagles of the Republic and in the horror film Lee Cronin's The Mummy in 2026.

Aside from his native Arabic, Chadat speaks German, English, and Spanish.
