= Kay Pollak =

Swedish film director (born 1938)

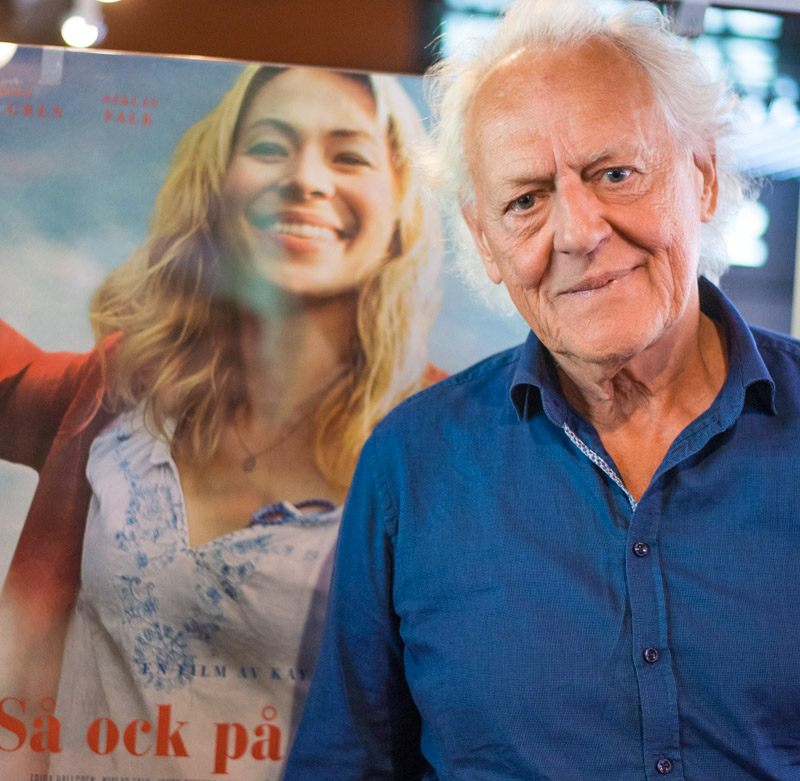
- Kay Pollak in 2015.
- Born: Kay Gunnar Leopold Pollak; 21 May 1938 (age 88); Gothenburg, Sweden
- Occupation: Film director
- Years active: 1972-present
- Spouse: Carin Pollak (m. 1986)

Kay Gunnar Leopold Pollak (born 21 May 1938) is a Swedish film director.

== Career ==
After a long break from film-making, he returned in 2004 with As It Is in Heaven (Så som i himmelen), a major box office success in Sweden. The film was nominated for an Academy Award for Best Foreign Language Film. It was also nominated for no less than eight Swedish Guldbagge Awards, including Best Direction and Best Film, but received none.

== TV and filmography ==
- The secret reality/Den Hemliga Verkligheten (1973) - script by Kay and Annamaria Pollak. Actors include Bertil Norström, Claes Elefalk, Stig Ossian Ericson and Peter Lindgren.
- Elvis! Elvis! (1977) - based on the book by Maria Gripe. Actors include Lele Dorazio and Allan Edwall. Entered into the 10th Moscow International Film Festival.
- Children's Island (Barnens ö) (1980) - based on the book by P. C. Jersild. Actors include Börje Ahlstedt and Tomas Fryk. It won the awards for Best Film, Best Director and Best Actor (Hirdwall) at the 17th Guldbagge Awards. It was also entered into the 31st Berlin International Film Festival.
- Love Me! (Älska mig) (1986) - about a teenaged girl called Sussie (Anna Lindén) who is placed in a foster home. It was entered into the 36th Berlin International Film Festival.
- As It Is in Heaven (Så som i himmelen) (2004) - actors include Michael Nyqvist and Frida Hallgren.
