= Ylva Lööf =

Swedish actress (born 1958)

Ylva Lööf (born 28 February 1958) is a Swedish actress who has appeared in a number of films and television shows.

She was born on 28 February 1958. She grew up in Nossebro.

== Filmography ==
- 1989–1991 – Tre kärlekar (English title Three Loves) (TV)
- 1992 – En komikers uppväxt (TV)
- 1994 – Min vän Percys magiska gymnastikskor (TV)
- 1997 – Rederiet (English title High Seas or The Shipping Company) (TV)
- 1998 – Skärgårdsdoktorn (TV)
- 1999 – Dödsklockan (TV)
- Hälsoresan - En smal film av stor vikt (1999)
- 2001 - Återkomsten (TV)
- Så som i himmelen (2004)
- Münsters fall (2005)
- Beck – Skarpt läge (2006)
