= The Egghead Republic =

1957 novel by Arno Schmidt

- Author: Arno Schmidt
- Original title: Die Gelehrtenrepublik
- Translator: Michael Horovitz
- Language: German
- Publisher: Stahlberg Verlag
- Publication date: 1957
- Publication place: West Germany
- English publication date: 1979
- Pages: 225

The Egghead Republic (German: Die Gelehrtenrepublik), also published as Republica Intelligentsia, is a 1957 novel by the German writer Arno Schmidt.

== Plot ==
It is the year 2008 and Earth has suffered a devastating nuclear war. The American journalist Charles Henry Winer is sent to report from the Western United States and visits two major locations. In a desert of Arizona, he encounters mutants and experimental hybrid creatures. He has a love affair with a female centaur named Thalia. On a floating island at the Pacific Ocean, he visits the International Republic of Artists and Scientists, where residents tell him about how they preserve and transplant human brains.

== Reception ==
Paul West of The Washington Post wrote that the novel is "sheer, complex fun" and offers "Schmidt as his feistiest, his most ingenious, and his most captivating".

== Adaptations ==
The Swedish film Egghead Republic was shot in 2023. The film is loosely based on the novel and set in Kazakhstan.

== See also ==
- List of nuclear holocaust fiction
