= Zineb Triki =

French-Moroccan actress (born 1980)

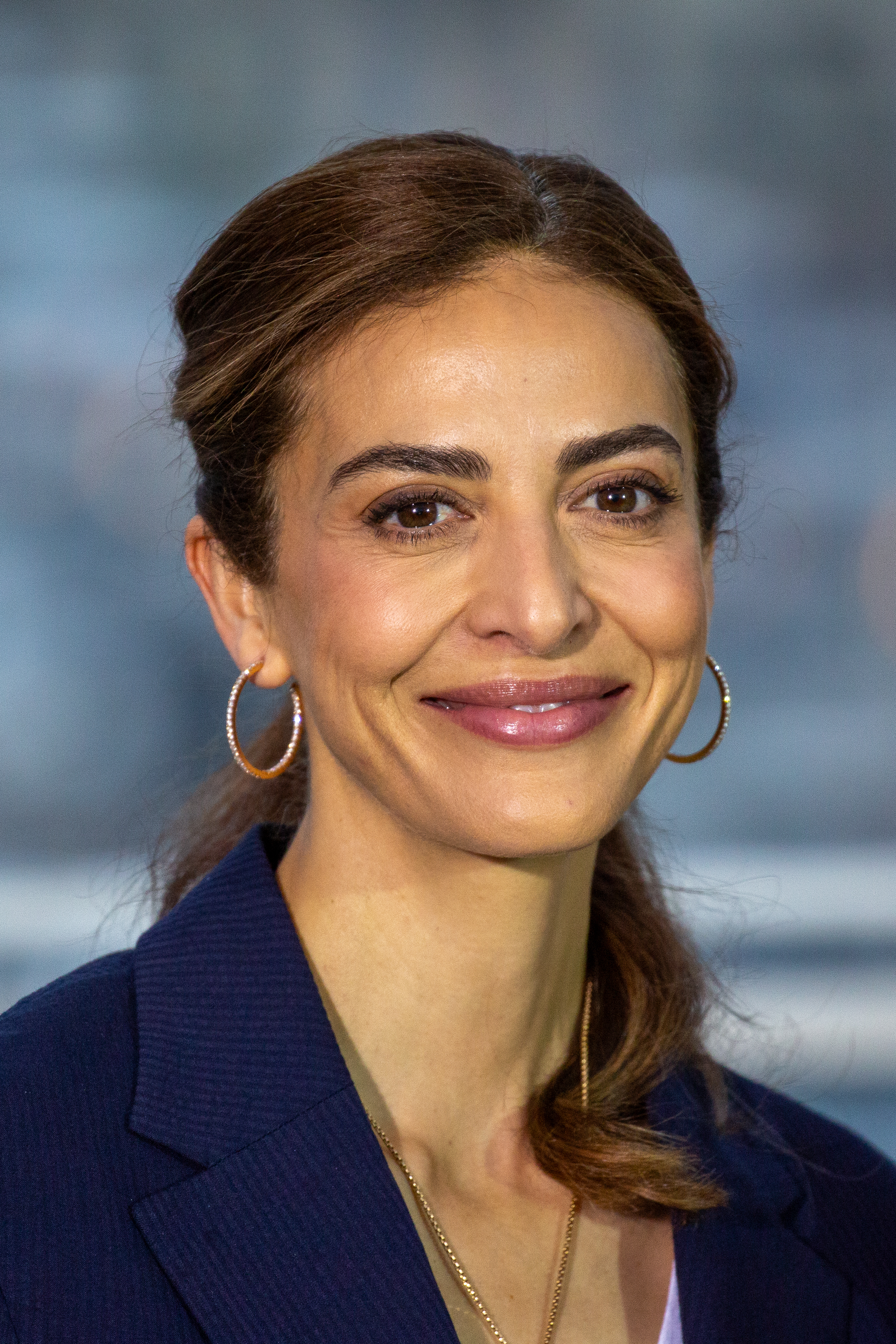
- Triki at the 2025 Cannes Film Festival
- Born: 1980 (age 45–46); Casablanca, Morocco
- Education: McGill University; Sorbonne University
- Occupation: actress
- Known for: The Bureau

Zineb Triki (Arabic: ﺯﻳﻨﺐ ﺗﺮﻳﻜﻲ; born 1980) is a French-Moroccan actress. She is known for her role as Nadia El Mansour in the French television series The Bureau.

== Biography ==
Zineb Triki was born in 1980 in Casablanca, Morocco. She attended a French school, where she took up theatre and classical dance. She moved to Paris at the age of 15 to attend high school.

She obtained a degree in political science from McGill University in Canada. She did an internship in UN headquarters in NY in 2003. She obtained a master's degree in political science from the Sorbonne University in Paris, then obtained another master's degree in audio-visual production in Paris.

Zineb Triki began her acting career in earnest from 2009, with short roles in 14h05 and The Misadventures of Franck and Martha. Her first film roles were in Deux fenêtres in 2013 and La Marche verte (2016). It was the TV series The Bureau that brought her to prominence with her role of Nadia El Mansour, who plays the love interest of the intelligence agent Guillaume Debailly (Mathieu Kassovitz).

Her performance as Nassim's mother in the 2017 film De toutes mes forces was described as "luminous, in this short and difficult role".

== Filmography ==
Triki has performed in the following television series and films:

- 2007 : 14h05
- 2009 : The Misadventures of Franck and Martha
- 2013 : Deux fenêtres
- 2014 : Hard Copy (Theater Comedy)
- 2016 : Glacé (TV series) - Charlène
- 2016 : La Marche verte (Film)
- 2015 – 2020 : The Bureau (TV series) - Nadia El Mansour
- 2017 : De toutes mes forces (Film) - Nassim's mother
- 2017 : Les grands esprits (Film) - Agathe
- 2019 : The Attaché (Tv Series) - raåna
- 2020 : Homeland (TV series) - Judge Haziq Qadir
- 2025 : Eagles of the Republic - Suzanne
- 2025 : T'as pas changé - Sofia
