= Kevlar Soul =

2025 drama film by Maria Eriksson-Hecht

- Film poster
- Swedish: Kevlarsjäl
- Directed by: Maria Eriksson-Hecht
- Written by: Pelle Rådström
- Produced by: Ronny Fritsche; Lizette Jonjic
- Starring: Josef Kersh; Rio Svensson
- Cinematography: Josua Enblom
- Edited by: Mervi Junkkonen; Robert Krantz
- Music by: Pessi Levanto
- Production company: Zentropa Sweden
- Release dates: 29 January 2025 (Gothenburg); 22 August 2025 (Sweden)
- Running time: 101 minutes
- Countries: Sweden; Norway; Finland
- Language: Swedish

Kevlar Soul (Swedish: Kevlarsjäl) is a 2025 coming-of-age drama film directed by Maria Eriksson-Hecht in her directorial debut from a screenplay written by Pelle Rådström. It stars Josef Kersh and Rio Svensson as Alex and Robin, respectively, two teenage brothers whose relationship drifts apart after finding love. It is an international co-production between Sweden, Norway, and Finland.

It had its world premiere at the Gothenburg Film Festival on 29 January 2025, competing at the Nordic Competition. It received seven nominations at the 61st Guldbagge Awards, including Best Film.

== Premise ==
A close relationship between two teenage brothers drifts apart after the older brother finds love and the younger one becomes involved in a conflict.

== Cast ==
- Josef Kersh as Alex
- Rio Svensson as Robin
- Adja Sise Stenson as Ines
- Jonay Pineda Shellac as Dennis
- Torkel Petersson as Bo
- Tyrone Michele as Nabil

== Production ==
In an interview with Cineuropa, Eriksson-Hecht stated that the main focus of the film was "children who take on huge responsibilities because there's no adult around to do it". She also noted that the film was partly inspired by the 2000 song of the same name by Swedish alternative rock band Kent. The project was first showcased at the 2019 Stockholm Industry Days at the STHLM Debut initiative. In November 2020, the project participated at the Baltic Event Co-Production Market, held during the Tallinn Black Nights Film Festival. It was chosen by the Baltic Event to be presented at the 2021 Marché du Film. In March 2022, it participated at the m:brane Pitch Days. It received a €150,000 production grant from the Finnish Film Foundation in March 2023. In July 2023, Eurimages awarded the project a €350,000 production grant. In August 2024, it took part at the New Nordic Films.

Principal photography took place in August 2023 in Norrköping. A casting call for the film was issued in September 2021.

== Release ==
Kevlar Soul had its world premiere at the 2025 Gothenburg Film Festival on 29 January at the Nordic Competition section. It was theatrically released in Sweden on 22 August 2025.

== Accolades ==
Award	Date	Category	Recipient	Result	Ref.
Gothenburg Film Festival	1 February 2025	Dragon Award for Best Nordic Film	Maria Eriksson-Hecht	Nominated	
Guldbagge Awards	19 January 2026	Best Film	Ronny Fritsche and Lizette Jonjic	Pending	
Guldbagge Awards	19 January 2026	Best Director	Maria Eriksson-Hecht	Pending	
Guldbagge Awards	19 January 2026	Best Actor in a Leading Role	Josef Kersh	Pending	
Guldbagge Awards	19 January 2026	Best Actor in a Supporting Role	Torkel Petersson	Pending	
Guldbagge Awards	19 January 2026	Best Actor in a Supporting Role	Jonay Pineda Skallak	Pending	
Guldbagge Awards	19 January 2026	Best Screenplay	Pelle Rådström	Pending	
Guldbagge Awards	19 January 2026	Best Editing	Mervi Junkkonen and Robert Krantz	Pending	
