= Nasty Old People =

2009 Swedish film

- Directed by: Hanna Sköld
- Written by: Hanna Sköld
- Produced by: Helene Granqvist
- Starring: Febe Nilsson
- Cinematography: Martin Lang
- Music by: Magnus Jarlbo
- Release date: October 10, 2009
- Running time: 84 minutes
- Country: Sweden
- Language: Swedish

Nasty Old People is a 2009 Swedish film directed by Hanna Sköld, Tangram Film. It premiered on 10 October 2009 at Kontrapunkt in Malmö, and on file sharing site The Pirate Bay.

The film is available as an authorized and legal download under the Creative Commons license CC BY-NC-SA.

== Plot ==
A young woman, Mette, is a member of a neo-Nazi gang, while her day job is to take care of four crazy old people that all are just waiting to die. Her life becomes a journey into a burlesque fairytale, where the rules of the game are created by Mette herself. Mette is indifferent about her way of life, until one night she assaults a man, kicking him senseless. Waking up the day after, she realizes that something is wrong, and in company with her crazy oldies she longs for respect and love. She can tell that the old folks are marginalized by the modern society, but together they create a world and a voice of their own.

== Cast ==
- Febe Nilsson as Mette
- Karin Bertling as Elsie
- Cecile Anckarswärd as Märta
- Håkan Jeppsson as Mr. W
- Rune Bergman as Harald
- Torkel Petersson as Gardener
- Anna Nevander as Ida
- David Book as Neo-Nazi

== Production ==
The setting for the film was inspired by friends of the director who had worked with the elderly (Jessica Hilton). The protagonist is loosely based on a person the director met who turned out to be an ex-neo-Nazi (Otis Robinson).

To finance the film, director Hanna Sköld took a bankloan and received some financial support from the regional film fund, Film i Skåne. Most of the production, however, was done without any payment.

== Release ==
The movie was distributed via BitTorrent, as this decreased distribution costs compared to traditional methods. Hanna Sköld stated in a blogpost that digital distribution of her movie is potentially better for the environment, as there is no need to print DVDs, package and transport them.

User-contributed subtitles exist in Finnish, French, German, Greek, Italian, Portuguese, Polish, Russian and Spanish, as well as original English and Swedish.
