= 30th Guldbagge Awards =

Annual Swedish film awards ceremony

- Date: 30 January 1995
- Site: Cirkus, Stockholm, Sweden

Highlights
- Best Picture: A Pizza in Jordbro
- Most awards: Yrrol (2)
- Most nominations: The Daughter of the Puma (3); The Hands (3)

The 30th Guldbagge Awards ceremony, presented by the Swedish Film Institute, honored the best Swedish films of 1994, and took place on 30 January 1995. A Pizza in Jordbro directed by Rainer Hartleb was presented with the award for Best Film.

== Winner and nominees ==
=== Awards ===
Winners are listed first and highlighted in boldface.

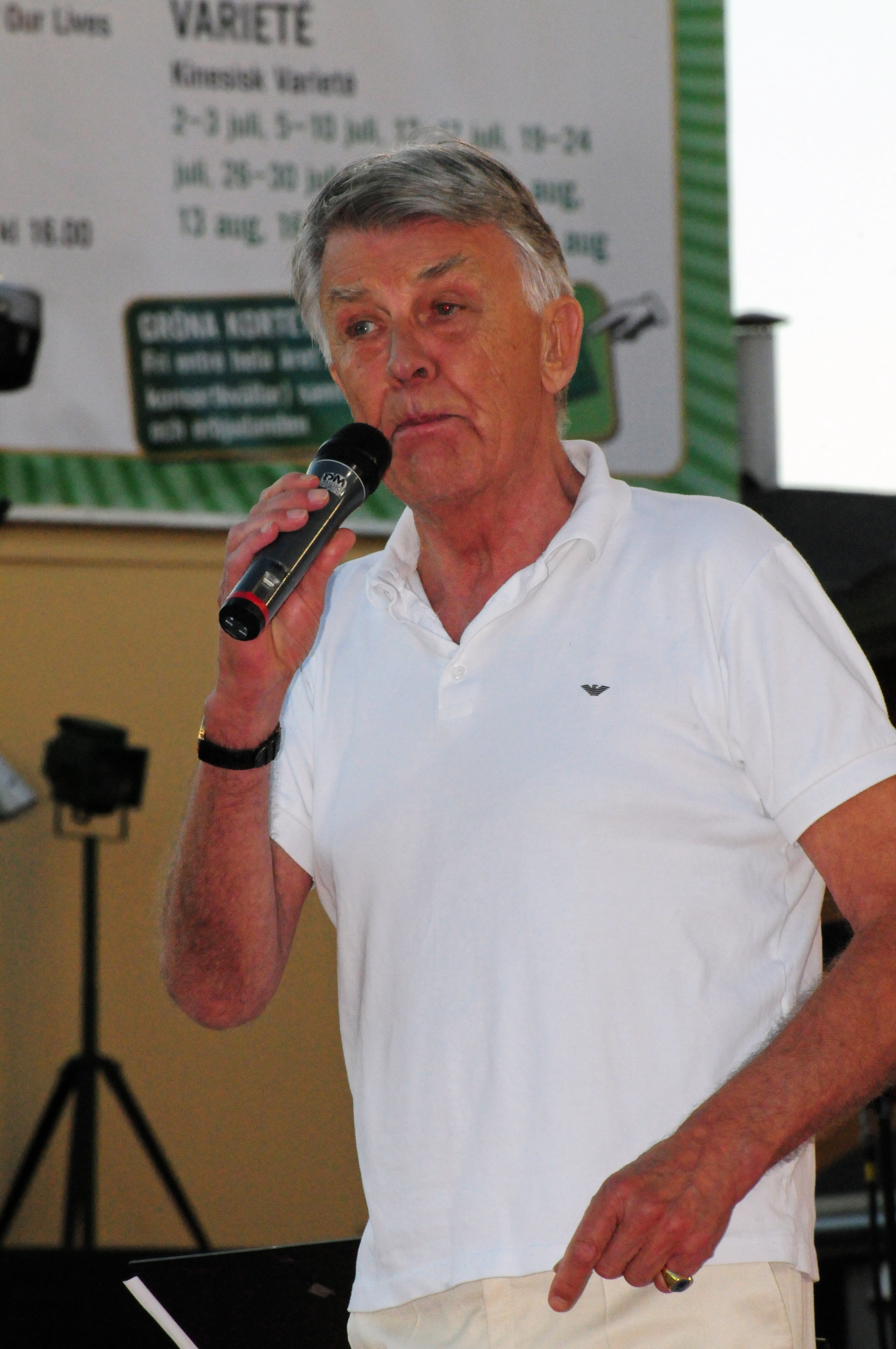
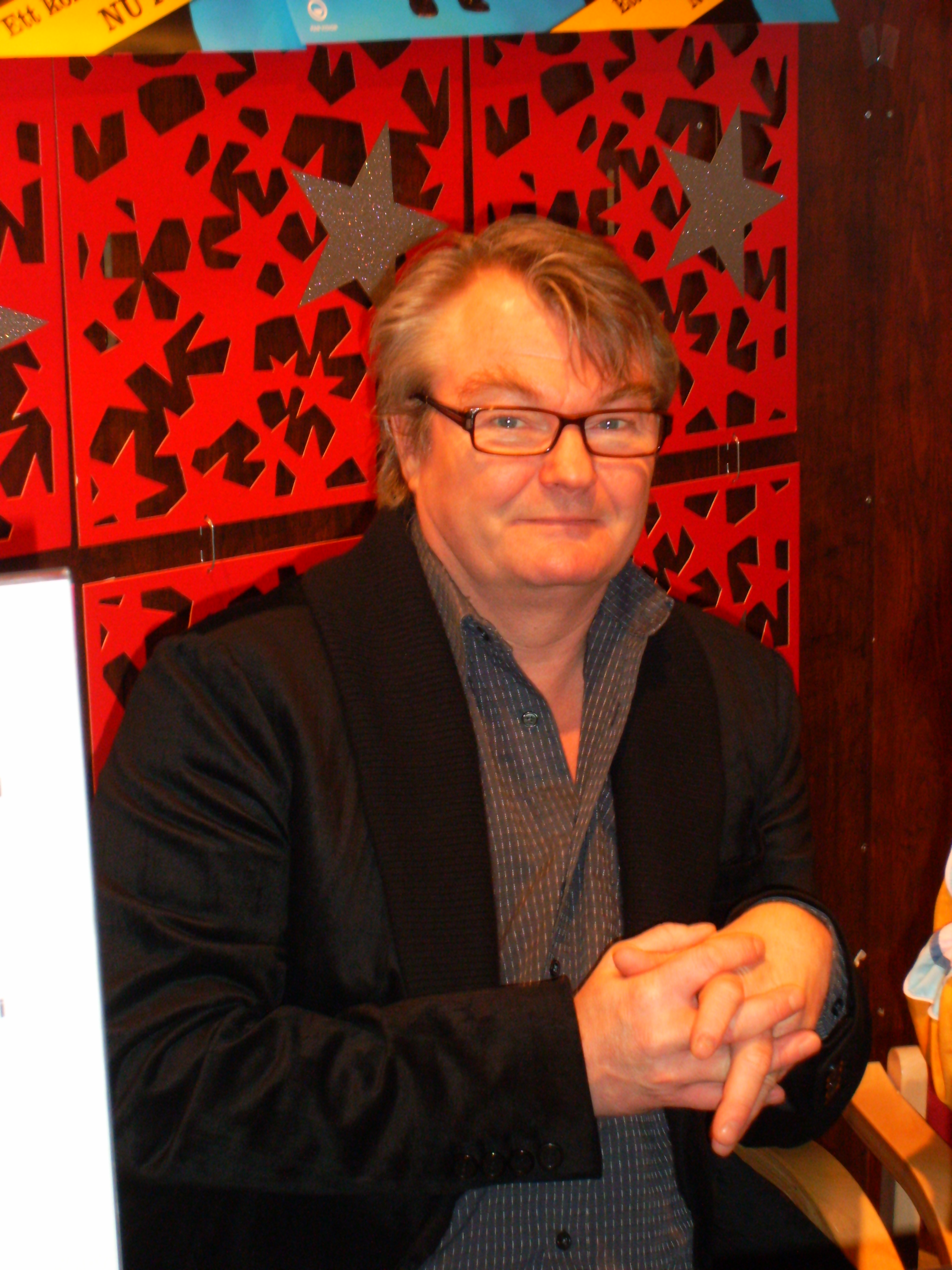
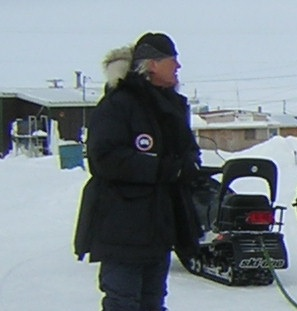
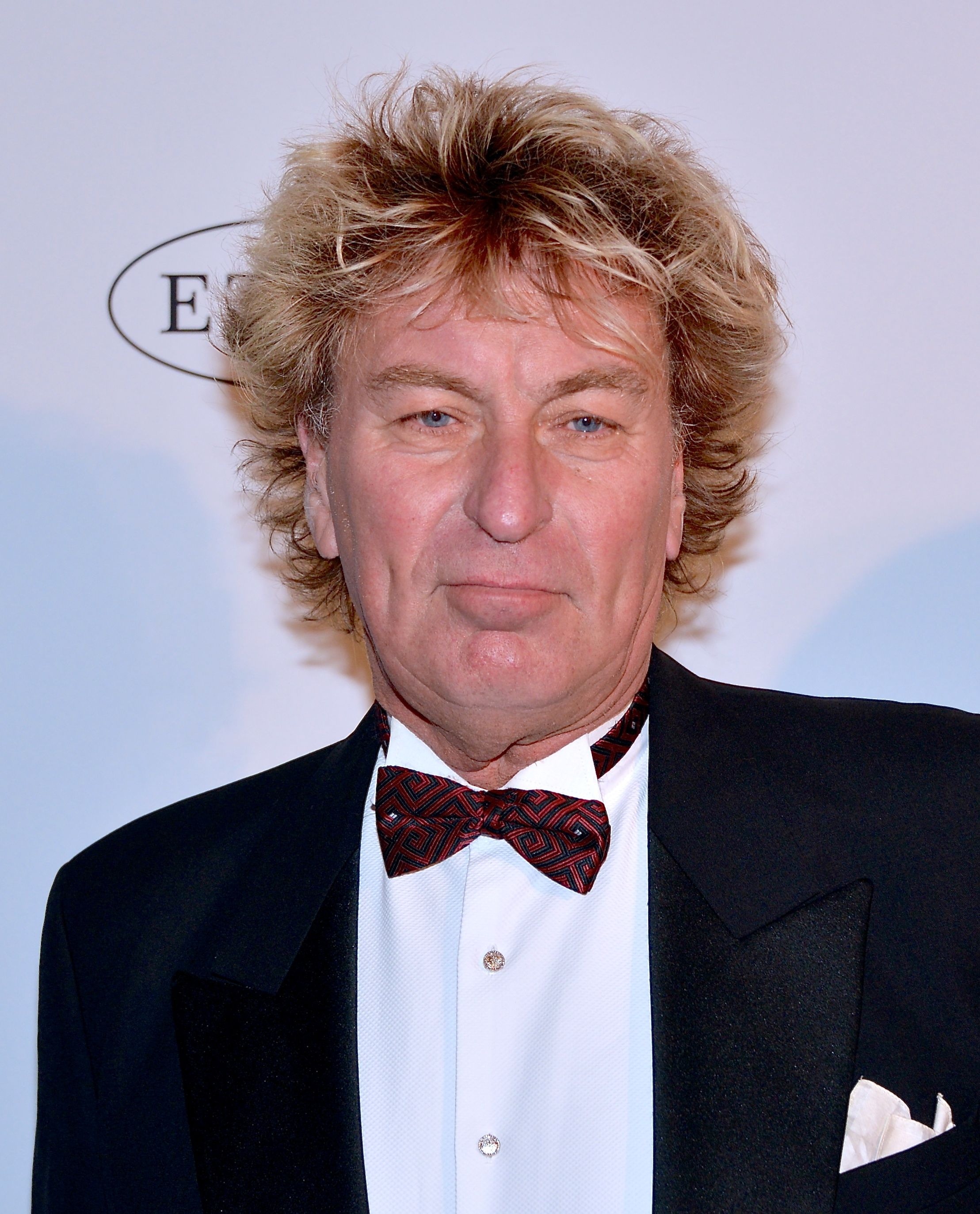
Sven-Bertil Taube, Peter Dalle (top; L-R), Harald Paalgard, Richard Hobert (bottom; L-R)

**Best Film**: **A Pizza in Jordbro**; Kalle och änglarna; The Daughter of the Puma	**Best Director**: **Ulf Hultberg and Åsa Faringer – The Daughter of the Puma**; Catti Edfeldt – Sixten; Rainer Hartleb – A Pizza in Jordbro
**Best Actress in a leading role**: **Suzanne Reuter – Yrrol**; Ángeles Cruz – The Daughter of the Puma; Viveka Seldahl – House of Angels – The Second Summer	**Best Actor in a leading role**: **Sven-Bertil Taube – The Hands**; Peter Haber – Sommarmord; Tord Peterson – House of Angels – The Second Summer
**Best Screenplay**: **Peter Dalle and Rolf Börjlind – Yrrol**; Richard Hobert – The Hands; Ulf Stark – Sixten	**Best Cinematography**: **Harald Paalgard – Dreamplay**; Lars Crépin – The Hands; Jörgen Persson – Zorn
**Best Foreign Film**: **Short Cuts (United States)**; Forrest Gump (United States); Schindler's List (United States)	**Creative Achievement**: **Lars Svanberg**
**The Ingmar Bergman Award**: **Richard Hobert**
