= Daniel Lemma =

Swedish-based musician/singer-songwriter (born 1972)

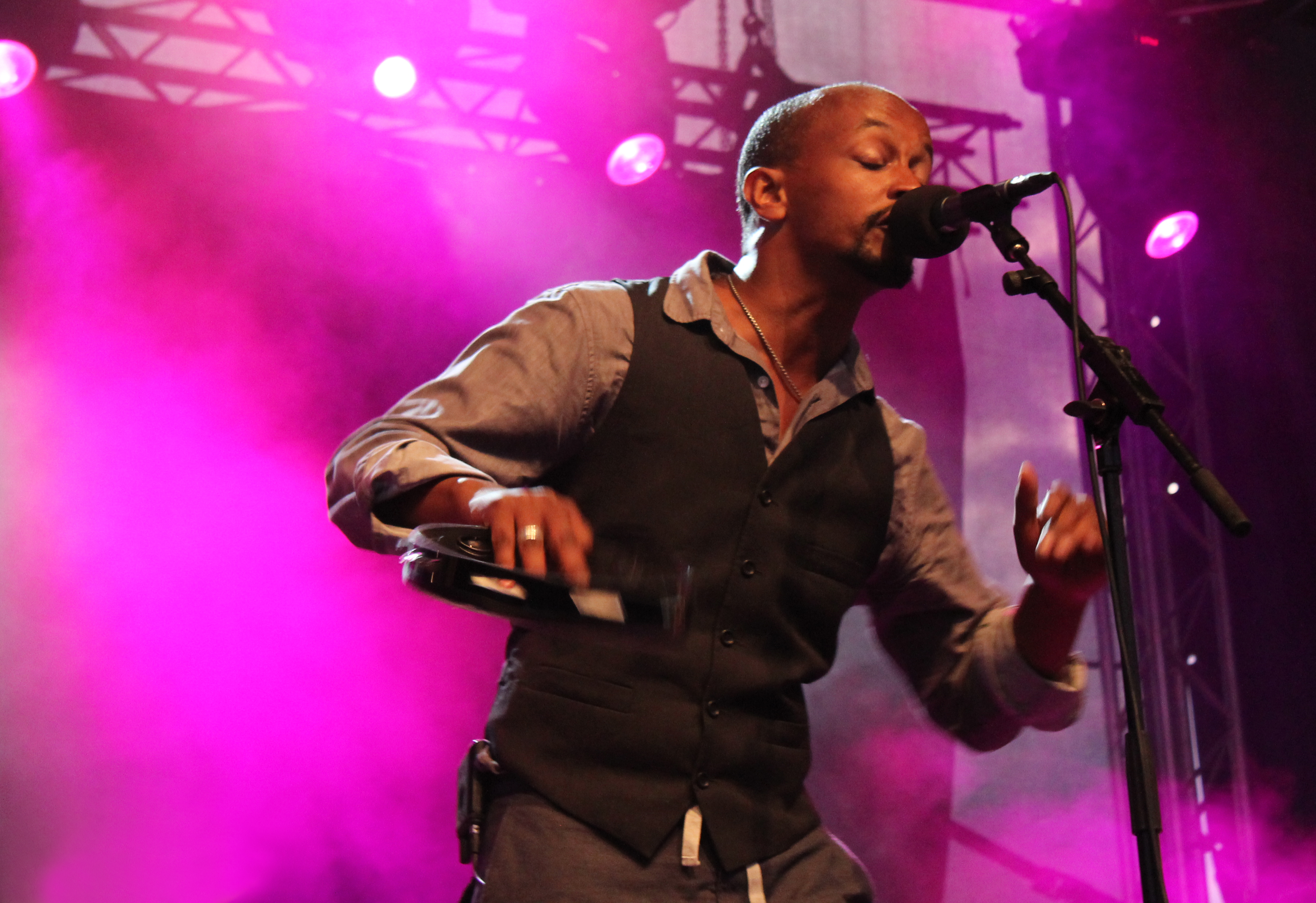
Daniel Lemma, 2011

Daniel Lemma (born 1970 in Ethiopia) is a Swedish-based musician/singer-songwriter.

His music is firmly connected to an American roots music tradition, with visible ties to early blues and gospel. He has referred to singers such as Lead Belly and Pops Staples as being very influential to him and artists such as Chuck Berry, James Brown and Bob Dylan. Daniel Lemma was born in Addis Abeba, Ethiopia, but came to Sweden as an infant. He formed his first band in his teens, and a couple of years later he moved to Gothenburg (where he still resides).

In the mid nineties, Lemma was a part of the group Mo Blues. He later moved to New York, where he recorded an album (for Pallas Records) that was never released due to a legal dispute.

After returning to Sweden in 2000, Lemma recorded the soundtrack to Josef Fares' movie Jalla! Jalla! (which in turn rendered Lemma a Grammis nomination for best song, the romantic "If I Used to Love You"). Morning Train, the album containing that single, went gold and served as a breakthrough to a much wider audience.

Daniel Lemma has released three albums for Warner Music: Morning Train (2001), Meeting at the Building (2003) and Dreamers and Fools (2005). He has also released three albums on his label Dextra Music: Somebody on Your Side (2007), Rebound (2009) and Telescope (2012). He has also made music for various films and theatre-projects.

In cooperation with Pär Klang, Lemma wrote and performed the official song, "Changing the World", of the World Scout Jamboree 2011.
