= Eagles of the Republic =

2025 film by Tarik Saleh

- French release poster
- Directed by: Tarik Saleh
- Written by: Tarik Saleh
- Produced by: Linus Stöhr Torell; Linda Mutawi; Johan Lindström; Alexandre Mallet-Guy
- Starring: Fares Fares; Lyna Khoudri; Amr Waked; Zineb Triki
- Cinematography: Pierre Aïm
- Edited by: Theis Schmidt
- Music by: Alexandre Desplat
- Production companies: Unlimited Stories; Apparaten; Memento Production
- Distributed by: SF Studios (Sweden, Denmark and Finland); Memento (France)
- Release dates: 19 May 2025 (Cannes); 12 November 2025 (France); 14 November 2025 (Sweden)
- Running time: 128 minutes
- Countries: Sweden; France; Denmark; Finland
- Language: Egyptian Arabic
- Budget: €9 million
- Box office: $1.4 million

Eagles of the Republic is a 2025 Egyptian Arabic-language political thriller film written and directed by Tarik Saleh, as the final installment of his Cairo trilogy, following The Nile Hilton Incident (2017) and Boy from Heaven (2022). It stars Fares Fares as George Fahmy, an Egyptian actor who is pressured to star in a propaganda film about the country's dictator Abdel Fattah el-Sisi. It also stars Lyna Khoudri, Amr Waked, Zineb Triki and Cherien Dabis.

The film had its world premiere at the main competition of the 2025 Cannes Film Festival on 19 May, where it was nominated for the Palme d'Or. It was theatrically released in France on 12 November 2025 by Memento, and in Sweden on 14 November. It was selected as the Swedish entry for the Best International Feature Film at the 98th Academy Awards, but it was not nominated.

== Premise ==
George Fahmy is one of Egypt's most popular actors, working on B-movies that must comply with the country's official censorship rules. While meeting his teenager son Ramy in a restaurant, he orders the waiter to remove a man presumably stalking him. During a date with Donya, his much younger actress girlfriend, Fahmy is approached by a group including a woman named Suzanne and probed about his loyalty to Egypt and its president Abdel Fattah el-Sisi, to which he responds sarcastically. Fahmy is promptly replaced in his current project and his trailer is removed from the studio lot. Fawzy, Fahmy's gay agent, informs him about a government official proposal for a movie about the president's role in the 2013 coup of Mohamed Morsi. Fahmy, who is a Christian Coptic, declines the role as he is neither Muslim nor the same height as el-Sisi. He confides to Fawzy that he would never accept being used as a propaganda tool.

Rula Haddad, Fahmy's regular co-star, is pressured to denounce him on live television for propaganda against the state, but decides not do it in the name of their long standing professional partnership. Shortly after, a frustrated Fahmy drives through Cairo, followed by armed men who threaten his son unless he complies with the government's official orders. Driving to his estranged wife's apartment, he checks in on Ramy and decides to take the role.

At the public unveiling of his casting, the man stalking Fahmy is introduced to him as Mansour, a senior presidential aide who will oversee the film production. Following a clash on set about the historical accuracy of the portrayal of certain events, Mansour reveals that Fahmy's home is bugged by repeating some acting advice he had given Donya, with whom he has become sexually impotent. At a dinner for officials involved with the film, Fahmy meets the Defense Minister and learns that he is Suzanne's husband. The military officials force Fahmy to agree to deliver a speech praising the president when he attends the Egyptian Military Academy for Armed Forces Day on 6 October.

Fahmy is invited to a film industry red carpet event to which he takes Ramy instead of Donya. He sees Suzanne and flirts with her, leading to a tryst in a hotel. When he returns home and is unable to show any photos with Ramy, Donya reveals she knows about his photos with Suzanne and leaves him. Shooting on the film continues and Fahmy pleads Rula's case to be un-blacklisted with the Defense Minister. Mansour reveals that he knows about Suzanne's affair and that the minister is obsessed with Rula. He threatens Fahmy with a forged suicide note and requests that Rula to meet with the minister while wearing a wire. At the subsequent meeting, Mansour hears a scuffle break out.

Before Fahmy gives his speech at the military academy, an aide requests that he salute as he finishes. When Fahmy does so, several parade participants begin shooting to try and assassinate the president. Fahmy escapes onto a military helicopter, where Mansour interrogates some captives before throwing them off. The helicopter lands at a secure bunker, where they learn that Sisi is alive, the Republican Guard has suppressed the coup attempt and censored it from media, and that the Defense Minister is with the troops. Mansour reveals that the dinner Fahmy had attended with the minister had been a coup planning session and arrests all participants except for Fahmy.

Mansour orders a reluctant Fahmy to meet with Suzanne to determine if she was involved. Suzanne is confused when confronted and Fahmy warns her to flee the country and that they cannot meet again. On the way out, the Defense Minister intercepts Fahmy and Suzanne, tells the former that Rula died after a fall off a balcony, and orders Fahmy to lie to investigators about his involvement in the coup attempt under threat of killing his loved ones. Fahmy returns to his wife's apartment and finds that Ramy has been kidnapped before he is taken away by Mansour's men. Mansour tells Fahmy that Fawzy was killed and Fahmy tells Mansour that Suzanne is innocent, revealing the Defense Minister's request, and begs him to save Ramy. Mansour orders the minister's arrest based on this, reunites Fahmy with his son, and has the minister arrested and executed by firing squad. Some time later, the film is released and Fahmy joins some old men betting on horse racing.

== Cast ==
- Fares Fares as George Fahmy
- Lyna Khoudri as Donya
- Amr Waked as Dr. Mansour
- Zineb Triki as Suzanne
- Husam Chadat as General
- Ahmed Khairy as Fawzy
- Cherien Dabis as Rula Haddad
- Donia Massoud as George's wife
- Sherwan Haji as Yasser Islam
- Tamim Heikal as Abu Talaat
- Suhaib Nashwan as Ramy
- Tamer Singer as Tarik-Abdalla
- Ahmad Diab as Studio man
- Abdel Fattah el-Sisi as himself

== Production ==
=== Development ===
The film is the final chapter of Saleh's "Cairo trilogy", following The Nile Hilton Incident (2017) and Boy from Heaven (2022), all three films tackle state corruption in different political and religious spheres of the Egyptian society. Saleh, the son of an Egyptian immigrant in Sweden, is an outspoken critic of the government of Abdel Fattah el-Sisi and Egypt's perceived lack of democracy. Shortly before the shooting of The Nile Hilton Incident, he was forced to leave the country immediately and became persona non grata.

Amr Waked, who portrays the government official Dr. Mansour, was also forced to leave the country in 2017 after pro-democracy posts in his social media. He was later sentenced to eight-years in prison for spreading disinformation. He currently lives in exile in Spain.

The film premise was inspired by Yasser Galal who portrayed el-Sisi in the series El Ekhteyar (The Choice), even though he bore no physical resemblance to the president. In 2025, Galal became one of the 100 presidential appointees to the Egyptian Senate.

=== Filming ===
Principal photography took place in Istanbul, who once again stand for Cairo, after a planned shoot in Casablanca was abruptly canceled. Some b-roll were shot in Cairo by an unidentified crew member in a car, serving as complement for scenes of George Fahmy driving through the city. Production concluded in July 2024. The production received a €500,000 grant from Eurimages during its Project Evaluation Session of 2024.

The film marks Fares Fares fourth collaboration with Saleh. Alexandre Desplat composed the film's soundtrack, marking his first collaboration with Saleh.

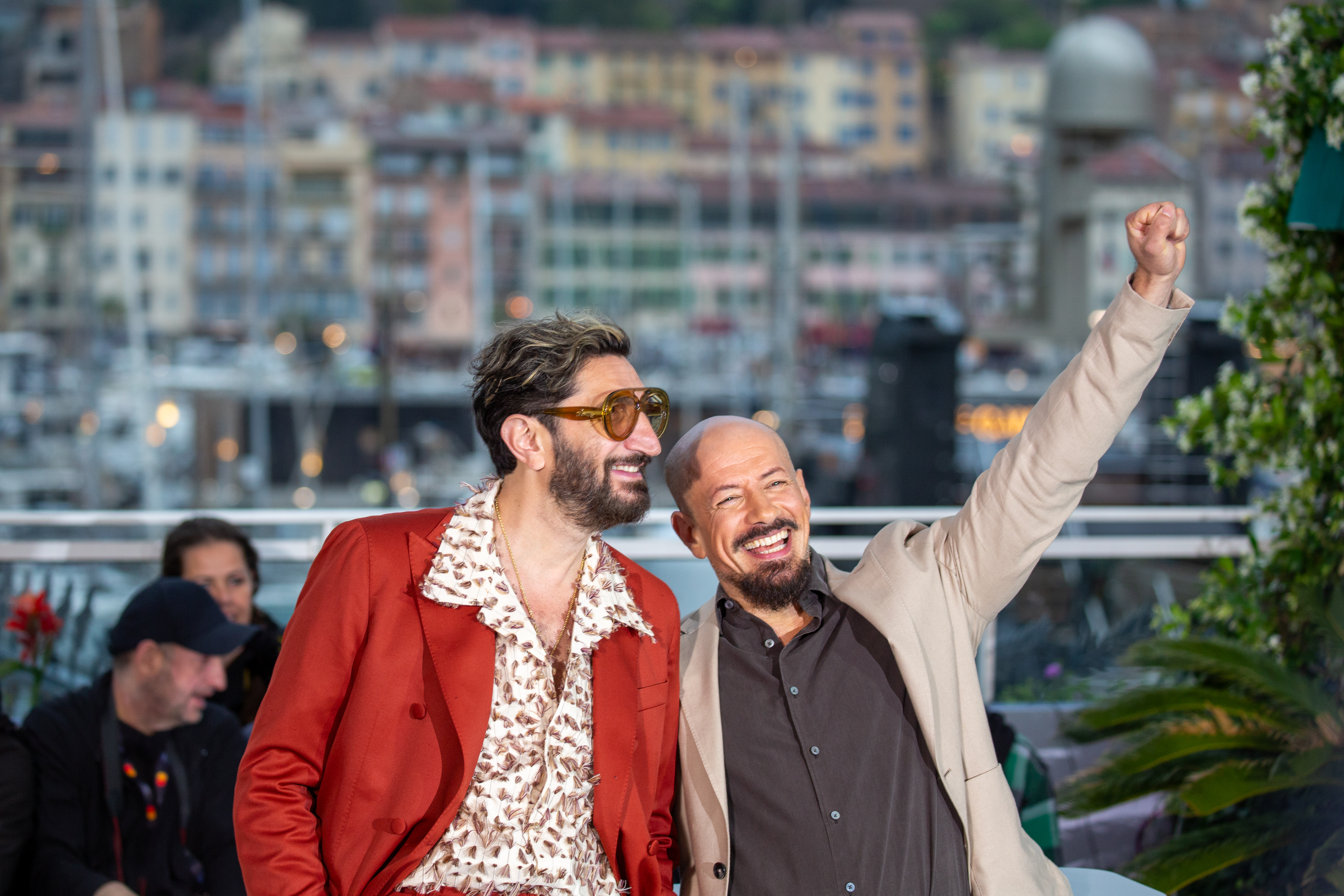
Fares and Saleh during the 2025 Cannes Film Festival

== Release ==
Eagles of the Republic had its world premiere on 19 May 2025 at the main competition of 2025 Cannes Film Festival. In May 2024, it was announced that Playtime would handle its international sales. Memento Distribution acquired the film's French distribution and SF Studios is set to distribute it in Nordic countries.

The film closed the 53rd Norwegian International Film Festival on 22 August 2025. It was also presented in the Icon section at the 30th Busan International Film Festival in September 2025. The film opened the 2025 Stockholm International Film Festival on 5 November 2025. The film competed in the Awards Buzz – Best International Feature Film section of the 37th Palm Springs International Film Festival on 6 January 2026.

== Reception ==
=== Box office ===
It was theatrically released in France on 12 November 2025, grossing $588k in its opening weekend in 228 theaters. By late December the film had grossed $1.4 million.

=== Critical response ===
On the review aggregator website Rotten Tomatoes, 73% of 41 critics' reviews are positive. The website's consensus reads: "An ambitious yet imperfect thriller, Eagles of the Republic blends old fashioned suspense, dark political satire, and romance into a fitfully entertaining portrait of celebrity and moral compromise." Metacritic, which uses a weighted average, assigned the film a score of 70 out of 100, based on 10 critics, indicating "generally favorable" reviews.

=== Accolades ===
Award / Film Festival	Date of ceremony	Category	Recipient(s)	Result	Ref.
Cannes Film Festival	24 May 2025	Palme d'Or	Tarik Saleh	Nominated	
Guldbagge Awards	19 January 2026	Best Film	Linus Stöhr Torell, Linda Mutawi, Johan Lindström, and Alexandre Mallet-Guy	Won	
Guldbagge Awards	19 January 2026	Best Director	Tarik Saleh	Nominated	
Guldbagge Awards	19 January 2026	Best Actor in a Leading Role	Fares Fares	Won	
Guldbagge Awards	19 January 2026	Best Screenplay	Tarik Saleh	Won	
Guldbagge Awards	19 January 2026	Best Cinematography	Pierre Aïm	Nominated	
Guldbagge Awards	19 January 2026	Best Costume Design	Virginie Montel	Won	
Guldbagge Awards	19 January 2026	Best Sound Design	Hans Møller	Nominated	
Guldbagge Awards	19 January 2026	Best Makeup and Hair	Saara Räisänen	Won	
Guldbagge Awards	19 January 2026	Best Original Score	Alexandre Desplat	Nominated	
Guldbagge Awards	19 January 2026	Best Production Design	Roger Rosenberg	Nominated	
Guldbagge Awards	19 January 2026	Best Visual Effects	Peter Hjort, Anders Nyman, Per Nyman, and Mikael Windelin	Won	

== See also ==
- List of submissions to the 98th Academy Awards for Best International Feature Film
- List of Swedish submissions for the Academy Award for Best International Feature Film
