= Fascinate =

Graffiti painting in Stockholm, Sweden

Coordinates: 59°22′53″N 17°54′34″E

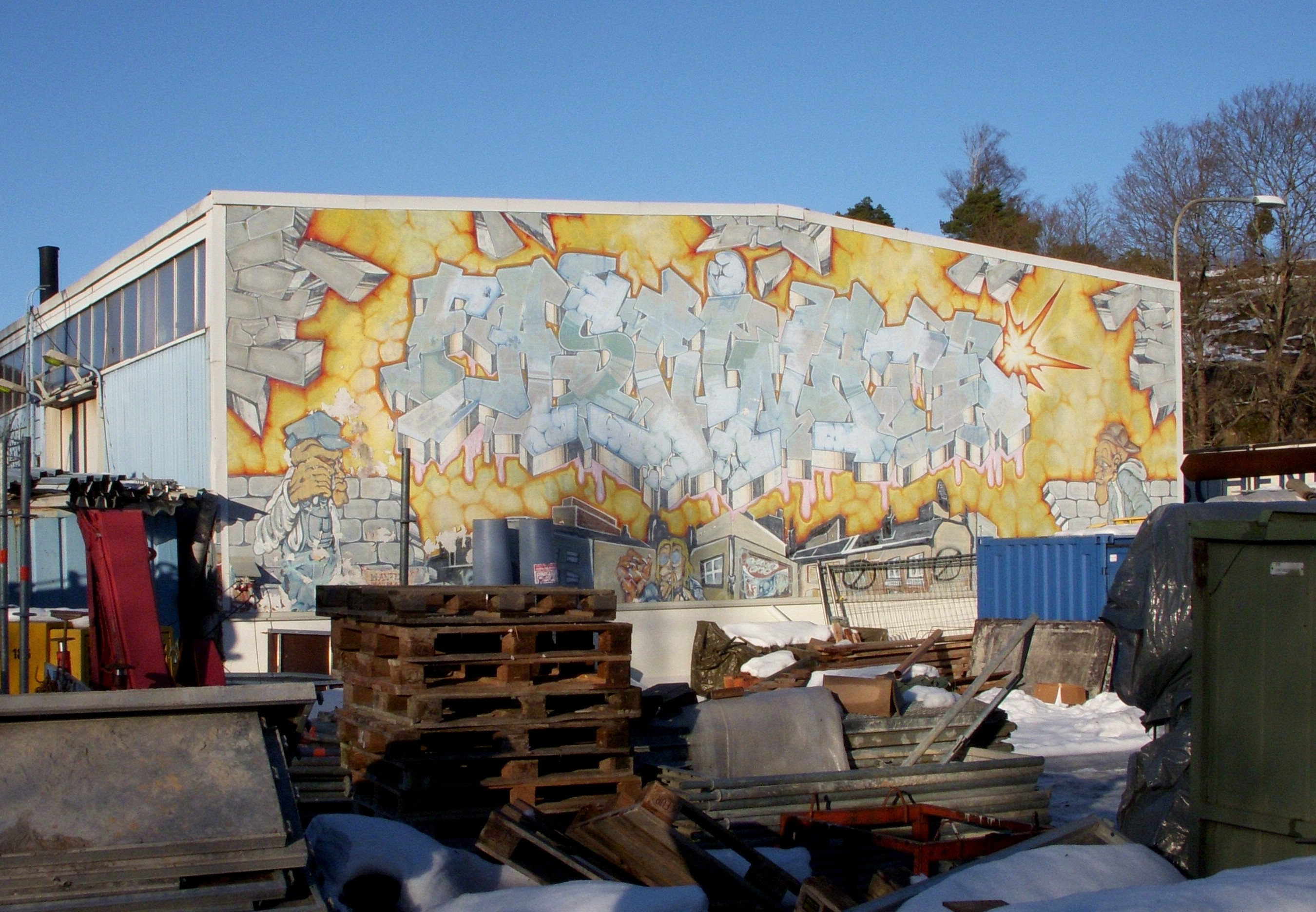
Fascinate in February 2011

Fascinate was a graffiti painting at an industrial park in Bromsten, Stockholm.

Fascinate was created by Circle and Tariq (Tarik Saleh), then 17 years old, in 1989 and was then the largest graffiti painting in northern Europe. It is painted on an outside wall of an industrial building and was made with consent from the property owner. Fascinate is one of the world's oldest extant graffiti paintings.

In 1989, graffiti was a relatively new phenomenon in Sweden. The Bromsten industrial area was reconstructed into a residential area starting in 2018. A discussion took place about possible protection of Fascinate as the Stockholm City Museum considered it culturally valuable. In 2008, however, the center-right majority in the city planning committee decided that the painting should not be maintained, referring to the city's graffiti policy, which says that the city should not "participate in activities that in any way encourages graffiti".

After a period of uncertainty regarding the future of Fascinate, the wall became the first graffiti work in Sweden to be officially protected in 2015. The rest of the building is to be demolished and the area around the wall transformed into a park.

In the end the artwork lost its protected status in May 2020 and was demolished December 2021.
