= Sebbe =

- Directed by: Babak Najafi
- Written by: Babak Najafi
- Produced by: Rebecka Lafrenz; Mimmi Spång
- Starring: Sebastian Hiort af Ornäs; Eva Melander; Kenny Wåhlbrink
- Cinematography: Simon Pramsten
- Production companies: Garagefilm International AB; Film i Väst; Sveriges Television AB
- Release date: 12 March 2010 (Sweden)
- Running time: 83 minutes
- Countries: Sweden; Finland
- Language: Swedish

Sebbe is a 2010 Swedish film written and directed by Babak Najafi. The film won the Guldbagge Award for Best Film at the 46th Guldbagge Awards.

== Plot ==
Sebbe is 15 years old and lives with his mother in an apartment that is too narrow. Sebbe always does his best and never strikes back. But when the mother fails, everything fails.

== Cast ==
- Sebastian Hiort af Ornäs as Sebbe
- Eva Melander as Eva, Sebbe's mother
- Kenny Wåhlbrink as Kenny
- Emil Kadeby as Emil
- Adrian Ringman as Adde
- Leo Salomon Ringart as Leo
- Åsa Bodin Karlsson as Kenny's mother
- Margret Andersson as The teacher
- Miran Kamala as Eva's boss

== Accolades ==
The film won the Guldbagge Award for Best Film at the 46th Guldbagge Awards.
