= 17th Guldbagge Awards =

Annual Swedish film awards ceremony

- Date: 30 October 1981
- Site: Hamburger Börs, Stockholm, Sweden

Highlights
- Best Picture: Children's Island

The 17th Guldbagge Awards ceremony, presented by the Swedish Film Institute, honored the best Swedish films of 1980 and 1981 and took place on 30 October 1981. Children's Island directed by Kay Pollak was presented with the award for Best Film.

== Awards ==
- Best Film: Children's Island by Kay Pollak
- Best Director: Kay Pollak for Children's Island
- Best Actor: Ingvar Hirdwall for Children's Island
- Best Actress: Gunn Wållgren for Sally and Freedom
- The Ingmar Bergman Award: Lasse Åberg
