= A Pizza in Jordbro =

1994 film

- Directed by: Rainer Hartleb
- Cinematography: Staffan Lindqvist
- Release date: 2 September 1994
- Running time: 75 minutes
- Country: Sweden
- Language: Swedish

A Pizza in Jordbro (Swedish: En pizza i jordbro) is a 1994 Swedish documentary film directed by Rainer Hartleb. The film won the Guldbagge Award for Best Film at the 30th Guldbagge Awards and Hartleb was nominated for the award for Best Director.

The film is part of Hartleb's Jordbro series that follows a group of people from Jordbro, Stockholm County, throughout their lives, starting in 1972. In its original run, A Pizza in Jordbro was the fifteenth installment of the series, but in subsequent re-edits it is the fifth film. The film serves as a summary of the entire project, with retrospectives of the preceding films.

== See also ==
- Up series
