= Children's Island (film) =

1980 film

- Theatrical Release Poster
- Directed by: Kay Pollak
- Written by: Kay Pollak
- Based on: Children's Island by P. C. Jersild
- Produced by: Bengt Forslund
- Starring: Thomas Fryk; Ingvar Hirdwall
- Cinematography: Roland Sterner
- Edited by: Thomas Holéwa
- Music by: Jean-Michel Jarre
- Distributed by: Svensk Filmindustri
- Release date: 25 December 1980 (Sweden)
- Running time: 109 minutes
- Country: Sweden
- Language: Swedish

Children's Island (Swedish: Barnens ö) is a Swedish drama film which was released to cinemas in Sweden on 25 December 1980, co-written and directed by Kay Pollak, starring Thomas Fryk and Ingvar Hirdwall. It is based on the novel of the same name by P. C. Jersild. Filming took place between July and October 1979. It won Sweden's most prestigious film prize, the Guldbagge, when it was released in 1980 and was Sweden's official selection for the 54th Academy Awards.

== Plot ==
The story is set in Stockholm where 11-year-old Reine is on the verge of puberty and afraid of sexual maturity. He lives in a suburb with his single mother who sends him to one of the traditional Swedish summer camps which were common at the time of the setting and were managed by the cities for children in need of visiting the countryside. The title of the film refers to an island that is home to many such camps. His mother then vacations on her own, but in fact Reine never goes to the camp. Instead he spends the summer exploring the city of Stockholm on his own, where he meets several strange adults.

== Cast ==
- Tomas Fryk as Reine Larsson
- Ingvar Hirdwall as Stig Utler
- Anita Ekström as Harriet Larsson
- Börje Ahlstedt as Hester
- Lars-Erik Berenett as Esbjörn
- Hjördis Petterson as Olga
- Sif Ruud as Mrs. Bergman-Ritz
- Lena Granhagen as Helen
- Majlis Granlund as Lotten
- Malin Ek as Kristina
- Maud Sjökvist as Maria
- Hélène Svedberg as Nora

== Reception ==
=== Awards ===
The movie was Kay Pollak's first commercial success, and won the awards for Best Film, Best Director and Best Actor (Hirdwall) at the 17th Guldbagge Awards. In 1981 it was entered into the 31st Berlin International Film Festival. The film was also selected as the Swedish entry for the Best Foreign Language Film at the 54th Academy Awards, but was not accepted as a nominee.

== Controversy ==
The film became controversial in Australia, being banned in 2014, over thirty years after its original release. Possession of this film in Western Australia and parts of the Northern Territory, would constitute a criminal offence.

== See also ==
- List of submissions to the 54th Academy Awards for Best Foreign Language Film
- List of Swedish submissions for the Academy Award for Best Foreign Language Film
