= Rainer Hartleb =

German-Swedish film director

Rainer Hartleb (born 29 February 1944) is a German-Swedish director of documentary films. He is best known for the Jordbro suite, a series of films that follows a group of people from Jordbro from the age of seven, when they began school in 1972, until the present. As of 2013, Hartleb has made six Jordbro films. En pizza i Jordbro (1994) won the Guldbagge Award for Best Film at the 30th Guldbagge Awards. On 13 January 2007 Hartleb won TV4's Guldsolen film prize for 2006.

He had a daughter with playwright Suzanne Osten.

== Filmography ==
- Jag bor på Hägerstensvägen (1970)
- Från en barndomsvärld (1973)
- Barnen från Jordbro (1982)
- Hemligheten (1982)
- Kärleken är allt (1986)
- Tillbaka till Jordbro (1988)
- Det var en gång... en liten flicka (1992)
- En pizza i Jordbro (1994)
- Wiedersehen in Hildburghausen (1996)
- Nya barn i Jordbro (2001)
- Alla mår bra (2006)
- När jag blir stor (2009)

== See also ==
- Up Series
