= Egghead Republic =

2025 Swedish science fiction film

- Teaser poster
- Directed by: Pella Kågerman; Hugo Lilja
- Screenplay by: Pella Kågerman; Hugo Lilja
- Based on: The Egghead Republic by Arno Schmidt
- Produced by: Nina Lund; Pella Kågerman
- Starring: Ella Rae Rappaport; Tyler Labine; Arvin Kananian; Emma Creed
- Cinematography: Malin Gutke
- Edited by: Oskar Blondell
- Music by: Juhana Lehtiniemi
- Animation by: Arild Andersson
- Production company: YouSavedMe
- Distributed by: NonStop Entertainment; Folkets Bio; Best Friend Forever
- Release date: 5 September 2025 (TIFF)
- Running time: 93 minutes
- Country: Sweden
- Languages: Swedish; English

Egghead Republic is a 2025 Swedish science fiction film directed and written by Pella Kågerman and Hugo Lilja. Inspired in part by Kågerman's tenure at Vice Magazine and the novel The Egghead Republic by Arno Schmidt, the film is set in an alternate reality in which the Cold War persists and a nuclear bomb has struck in Soviet Kazakhstan.

The film was selected in the Discovery section of the 2025 Toronto International Film Festival and had its World premiere on 6 September 2025.

== Cast ==
- Ella Rae Rappaport as Sonja Schmidt, the young Swedish club kid
- Tyler Labine as Dino Davis, the magazine owner
- Arvin Kananian as Turan Hiram
- Emma Creed as Gemma
- Andrew Lowery
- Gina Dirawi as Pin-Up Bob
- Merlin Leonhardt as Sergeant Barcoff
- Milan Dragisic
- Hussain Currimbhoy as Journalist
- Anna-Lu Franz
- Lara Golay
- Stephen Rappaport as Bob Singleton

== Production ==
The film was shot in May 2023, on the island of Gotland in Sweden.

== Release ==
Egghead Republic had its world premiere at the 2025 Toronto International Film Festival on 5 September 2025 in Discovery section.

It was presented at the Riga International Film Festival in Nordic Highlights on 17 October 2025.

It was presented at the Trieste Science+Fiction Festival for its Italian Premiere and competed in Méliès Competition on 30 October 2025.

It competed in Competition section of the 2025 Stockholm International Film Festival on 8 November 2025 vying for the Bronze Horse.

In March 2026, it will be presented in the Country Focus section of the Glasgow Film Festival.

It is scheduled for release in Swedish theatres on 28 November 2025 by NonStop Entertainment.

== Reception ==
Davide Abbatescianni of Cineuropa, at the 2025 Toronto International Film Festival, described the film as a "cinematic anomaly" marked by its extremes. Abbatescianni noted that the film shifts "from genius into sheer madness," with humour that is "broad" and surreal elements that verge on excess. Because of these qualities, Abbatescianni found the film unforgettable, calling it "hilarious and gruesome, incisive and idiotic, at once inspired and deranged." He suggested that while some viewers may dismiss it as nonsensical, others might regard it as visionary, concluding that "forgetting [the film] is not an option".

=== Accolades ===
Award	Date	Category	Recipient	Result	Ref.
Stockholm International Film Festival	16 November 2025	Bronze Horse	Egghead Republic	Nominated	
Stockholm International Film Festival	16 November 2025	Audience Award	Egghead Republic	Won	
Guldbagge Awards	19 January 2026	Best Film	Nina Lund, Pella Kågerman, and Hugo Lilja	Nominated	
Guldbagge Awards	19 January 2026	Best Actress in a Leading Role	Ella Rae Rappaport	Nominated	
Guldbagge Awards	19 January 2026	Best Actor in a Supporting Role	Arvin Kananian	Nominated	
Guldbagge Awards	19 January 2026	Best Makeup and Hair	Tuija Valén	Nominated	
Guldbagge Awards	19 January 2026	Best Production Design	Petra Kågerman	Won	
