= Jalla! Jalla! =

- Film poster
- Directed by: Josef Fares
- Written by: Josef Fares
- Produced by: Anna Anthony
- Starring: Fares Fares; Torkel Petersson; Tuva Novotny; Laleh Pourkarim
- Cinematography: Aril Wretblad
- Music by: Daniel Lemma
- Release date: 22 December 2000 (Sweden)
- Running time: 89 minutes
- Country: Sweden
- Languages: Swedish; Arabic

Jalla! Jalla! is a Swedish comedy film, which was released in cinemas in Sweden on 22 December 2000. It is directed by Swedish-Lebanese filmmaker Josef Fares, and stars Fares Fares, Torkel Petersson, Tuva Novotny and Laleh Pourkarim in the leading roles. It is Fares's directorial debut film and received seven film festival nominations, of which it won four. The film was selected as the Swedish entry for the Best Foreign Language Oscar at the 74th Academy Awards, but it did not make the final shortlist.

“Jalla! Jalla!” is Arabic for “Come on!” or “Hurry up!”.

== Plot ==
Best friends Roro (Fares Fares) and Måns (Torkel Petersson) work in park management carrying out day-to-day manual jobs. Roro's Swedish girlfriend Lisa (Tuva Novotny) is keen to be introduced to Roro's family, something he has been reluctant to do because his Lebanese family would prefer he marries a Lebanese woman. When Roro finally decides to introduce Lisa to his family, he walks into the apartment full of relatives who are planning his marriage to a Lebanese girl named Yasmine (Laleh Pourkarim).

== Soundtrack ==
Daniel Lemma was contacted by Josef Fares to work on the movie's score.

== Reception ==
Jalla! Jalla! has an approval rating of 56% on review aggregator website Rotten Tomatoes, based on 9 reviews, and an average rating of 5.6/10.

== See also ==
- List of submissions to the 74th Academy Awards for Best Foreign Language Film
- List of Swedish submissions for the Academy Award for Best Foreign Language Film
