= Live a Little (film) =

2025 film by Fanny Ovesen

- Film poster
- Swedish: Leva lite
- Directed by: Fanny Ovesen
- Written by: Fanny Ovesen
- Produced by: Marie Kjellson
- Starring: Embla Ingelman-Sundberg; Aviva Wrede
- Cinematography: Mattias Pollak
- Edited by: Mathilde Fridlund
- Music by: Martin Dirkov
- Production companies: Kjellson & Wik; Ström Pictures; Film i Väst
- Release dates: 25 January 2025 (Gothenburg); 7 February 2025 (Sweden)
- Running time: 98 minutes
- Countries: Sweden; Norway; Denmark
- Language: Swedish

Live a Little (Swedish: Leva lite) is a 2025 road drama film written and directed by Fanny Ovesen in her directorial debut. The film stars Embla Ingelman-Sundberg and Aviva Wrede as Laura and Alex, respectively, best friends who are couch surfing around Europe. It is an international co-production of Sweden, Denmark, and Norway.

It had its world premiere at the Gothenburg Film Festival on 25 January 2025, competing at the Nordic Competition section. It was theatrically released in Sweden on 7 February 2025. It received four nominations at the 61st Guldbagge Awards, including Best Film.

== Premise ==
The dynamic of a best-friend trip couch surfing around Europe shifts after one of them wakes up naked on a stranger's bed, with no recollection of the previous night.

== Cast ==
- Embla Ingelman-Sundberg as Laura
- Aviva Wrede as Alex
- Thelma Buabeng as Jana
- Odin Romanus as Elias

== Production ==
Under the working title Laura, the project received a €140,000 production grant from the Nordisk Film & TV Fond in January 2023. In April 2023, it also received a €400,000 production grant from Eurimages on its Project Evaluation Session. At the 2023 Marché du Film, Film i Väst announced the project as part of its slate. In January 2024, it participated at the Nordic Film Market, held during the Gothenburg Film Festival.

Principal photography took place in Poland, Germany, France, and Czech Republic.

== Release ==
Live a Little had its world premiere at the 2025 Gothenburg Film Festival on 25 January 2025, competing at the Nordic Competition section. Shortly after the premiere, LevelK acquired the film's international sales.

It was released in Swedish theatres on 7 February 2025.

== Accolades ==
Award	Date	Category	Recipient	Result	Ref.
Gothenburg Film Festival	1 February 2025	Dragon Award for Best Nordic Film	Fanny Ovesen	Nominated	
Gothenburg Film Festival	1 February 2025	Angelospriset	Fanny Ovesen	Won	
Guldbagge Awards	19 January 2026	Best Film	Marie Kjellson	Pending	
Guldbagge Awards	19 January 2026	Best Director	Fanny Ovesen	Pending	
Guldbagge Awards	19 January 2026	Best Actress in a Leading Role	Embla Ingelman-Sundberg	Pending	
Guldbagge Awards	19 January 2026	Best Screenplay	Fanny Ovesen	Pending	
