= As It Is in Heaven =

2004 film

- Theatrical release poster
- Directed by: Kay Pollak
- Written by: Kay Pollak, Anders Nyberg, Ola Olsson, Carin Pollak, Margaretha Pollak
- Produced by: Anders Birkeland; Göran Lindström
- Starring: Michael Nyqvist; Frida Hallgren; Helen Sjöholm
- Distributed by: Sonet Film
- Release dates: 3 September 2004 (Sweden); 30 November 2006 (Australia)
- Running time: 132 minutes
- Country: Sweden
- Languages: Swedish; English
- Budget: SEK 25,000,000 ≈ US$3,700,000
- Box office: $18,328,469

As It Is in Heaven (Swedish: Så som i himmelen) is a 2004 Swedish drama film directed by Kay Pollak and starring Michael Nyqvist and Frida Hallgren. It was a box office hit in Sweden and several other countries. It was nominated for Best Foreign Language Film at the Hollywood 77th Academy Awards.

== Plot ==
Daniel Daréus (Michael Nyqvist) is a successful and renowned international conductor whose life aspiration is to create music that will open people's hearts. His own heart, however, is in bad shape. After suffering a heart attack on stage at the end of a performance, he retires indefinitely to Norrland in the far north of Sweden, to the village where he endured a terrible childhood of bullying.

Daniel buys the old elementary school in the village, and soon after is asked to come along one Thursday night and listen to the local choir. He is only asked to listen, and maybe offer some helpful advice, but their intentions of persuading him to help are obvious. He eventually agrees to help, albeit reluctantly. Daniel approaches the parish minister to seek the position of cantor. He starts helping the choir grow and develop, rediscovering his own joy in music.

Almost immediately, Lena (Frida Hallgren), an attractive young girl in the choir, catches his attention. As they grow closer and fall in love, he realises that he is surrounded by the villagers' personal problems. Inger (Ingela Olsson) is married to the respected minister, Stig (Niklas Falk), but has failed to develop a loving sexual relationship with him. Siv (Ylva Lööf) is so obsessed with morality that she cannot enjoy herself. Arne (Lennart Jähkel) is so ambitious for the choir's success that he obsesses over tiny mistakes, failing to see that he is making bigger mistakes himself. Tore (André Sjöberg) is mentally handicapped and shunned but is eventually included in the choir; Holmfrid (Mikhael Rahm) has put up with being called "Fatso" by Arne since childhood and eventually stands up to him. Gabriella (Helen Sjöholm) is beaten and abused by her husband, Conny (Per Morberg), a fact that is known to and ignored by the whole village. She eventually finds the strength to leave him, as the whole village finds its strength to help her. Conny himself turns out to be the bully who was at school with Daniel and drove him from the village. He blames the choir and Daniel for his wife's decision and beats him up. This lands Conny in jail. The minister, Stig, is jealous of the choir's success and tries to close it down. His failure precipitates his eventual nervous breakdown.

The choir is accepted into the annual "Let the Peoples Sing" competition (Arne has registered the choir without consulting anyone), and they journey to Innsbruck, Austria, to perform. Lena fears Daniel will leave her for his sophisticated friends from the music world, when she sees them kissing and hugging him. He dares at last to tell her he loves her and then they make love. On the day of the competition, the choir is ready on stage but Daniel is nowhere to be seen. His heart has been affected by his anxiety, and he has another heart attack. Daniel staggers into the restroom, unsure of how to handle the situation, then stumbles and hits his head on the pipe below a sink, causing him to bleed severely. He lies helplessly on the tile, blood gushing from his head, listening to the choir harmonising wordlessly over the loudspeakers. The audience in the auditorium is enchanted and joins in. Daniel smiles to himself and loses consciousness.

The final scene shows Daniel rushing through the wheat fields towards his younger self, whom he raises triumphantly, having achieved his life's goal, to "create music that will open a person's heart".

== Cast ==
- Michael Nyqvist as Daniel Daréus
- Frida Hallgren as Lena
- Helen Sjöholm as Gabriella
- Lennart Jähkel as Arne
- Ingela Olsson as Inger
- Niklas Falk as Stig
- Per Morberg as Conny
- Ylva Lööf as Siv
- André Sjöberg as Tore
- Mikael Rahm as Holmfrid
- Barbro Kollberg as Olga
- Axelle Axell as Florence
- Lasse Petterson as Erik
- Ulla-Britt Norrman as Amanda

== Release ==
As It Is in Heaven was particularly successful in Australia. The Hayden Orpheum in the Sydney suburb of Cremorne showed the film for 103 weeks (as of November 2008), making it one of the longest-running films in Australian history. By comparison, The Sound of Music ran in Adelaide for over three years. A celebration of the popularity and spirit of the film was held at the Orpheum in August 2007 with a concert of Scandinavian music including a finale of "Gabriella's Song" from the film. A recording of proceedings was made for the director Kay Pollak and, via a pre-recorded message to the audience, he thanked Sydneysiders for embracing the film so warmly.

It ran for 52 weeks in New Zealand and had good word-of-mouth audiences in Sweden, Germany and the Netherlands.

== Reception ==
=== Critical response ===
As It Is in Heaven has an approval rating of 83% on review aggregator website Rotten Tomatoes, based on six reviews, and an average rating of 6.67/10.

=== Awards and nominations ===
The film was nominated for Best Foreign Language Film at the 77th Academy Awards. At the Swedish Guldbagge Awards it made history by being nominated in every possible category, while at the same time failing to win a single award.

== Stage musical ==
A critically acclaimed stage musical adaptation of the film written by Carin and Kay Pollak, music by Fredrik Kempe and book by Kay Pollak, Edward af Sillen and Carin Pollak opened at the Oscarsteatern in Stockholm on September 13, 2018. It has since been translated for other countries such as Germany and Norway.

== Sequel ==
A stand-alone sequel, Heaven on Earth (Swedish: Så ock på Jorden), also directed by Kay Pollak was released in 2015.

== See also ==
- List of submissions to the 77th Academy Awards for Best Foreign Language Film
- List of Swedish submissions for the Academy Award for Best Foreign Language Film
