= Torkel Petersson =

Swedish actor and comedian (born 1969)

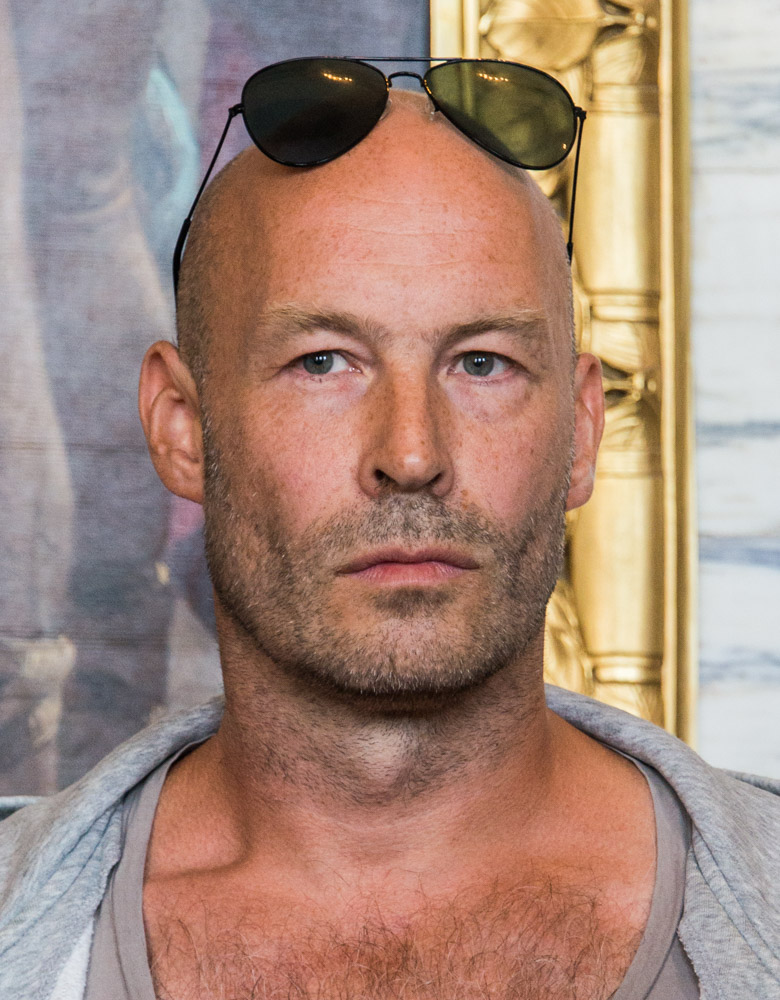
- Petersson in August 2015
- Born: Ola Torkel Petersson; 19 August 1969 (age 57); Lund, Sweden
- Education: Swedish National Academy of Mime and Acting
- Occupations: Actor; comedian
- Years active: 1999–present
- Spouse: Charlotte "Lotta" Forsblad (m. 2013)

Ola Torkel Petersson (born 19 August 1969) is a Swedish actor and comedian.

== Selected filmography ==
- 1999: Zero Tolerance (Swedish title: Noll tolerans)
- 2000: Jalla! Jalla!
- 2002: Old Men in New Cars (Danish title: Gamle mænd i nye biler)
- 2003: Kopps
- 2006: Offside
- 2008: Patrik, Age 1.5
- 2009: Nasty Old People
- 2010: Balls
- 2014: Jönssonligan – Den perfekta stöten (Reboot of Jönssonligan)
- 2015: Eternal Summer
- 2018: Halvdan Viking
- 2025: Kevlar Soul
