= Mimmi Spång =

Swedish film producer (born 1973)

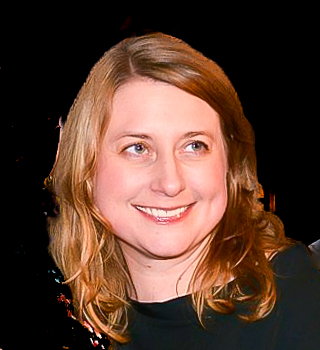
- Born: Katarina Margareta Spång; 4 May 1973 (age 53); Sweden
- Occupation: film producer

Katarina Margareta Spång (born May 4, 1973), more known under the name Mimmi Spång, is a Swedish film producer and production manager. She has been involved with and produced several films, notably the Swedish productions Sebbe and Call Girl.

== Education ==
She graduated from the Stockholm Academy of Dramatic Arts (SADA) in 2001 (previously known as University College of Film, Radio, Television and Theatre).

== Career ==
Spång first accepted a position at Memfis Film. She worked there for three years and participated in projects such as Zozo and Kopps as first assistant director. Spång stated in an interview that she found her time at Memfis to be extremely enlightening, but that she felt that she wanted to work as a producer. She founded her own company and was hired by Garagefilm International in 2007. Spång became one of the co-owners of Garagefilm together with founders Malte Forsell and Håkan Lindhé, and her longtime producer partner, Rebecka Lafrenz.

Spång and Lafrenz met as students at SADA in 1998. They moved together from their graduation to Memfis Film and Garagefilm. Together they have produced several films, among them being Sebbe, Call Girl and Cockpit. In 2011 Spång and Lorenz were chosen to represent Sweden in European Film Promotions Producers on the Move at the Cannes film festival. In 2011, the duo were awarded the Lorens prize for producers at the Gothenburg Film festival.

"The choice is obvious. Without Garagefilm, their commitment, knowledge and courage, the Swedish film industry would be poorer," commented Swedish Film Institute international chief, Pia Lundberg, about sending Spång and Lafrenz to Cannes.

Some of Spång's films received criticism. Call Girl was critiqued for insinuating that one of Sweden's previous prime ministers, Olof Palme, participated in purchasing sexual favors from minors. Both Palme's son, Mårten Palme, and several other people reacted strongly to this depiction, finding it offensive and "tainting". The director and writers' attempt to explain that everything in the film was purely fiction was rejected as cowardly by Swedish newspaper SvD head of culture, Mårten Jönsson.

In 2012, the Swedish Ministry of Foreign Affairs and the Swedish institute arranged a film festival in Bangkok, Thailand. The Swedish newspaper Dagens Nyheter (Daily News) later reported that the organization of this festival in part was an attempt to sell military aircraft. Several filmmakers that were involved with the festival were outraged to learn that their work could be connected to the selling of war machines. Spång was among these filmmakers and stated, "We really don't want any of our films to contribute to weapons exports. We find it absolutely appalling."

In 2013, SFI's Film room held a conference called Film Politics 2020, inviting Swedish filmmakers to speak discuss film politics. Spång was a representative for Swedish producers, together with Peter "Piodor" Gustafsson. Spång stated that she believes in quotation for the development of Swedish film production to begin its evolution concerning human variety in the film industry.

== Recognition ==
Spång's career got off to a solid start when her graduation-project Viktor and his Brothers won the Swedish Guldbagge Award for Best Short Film in 2002. Several of her projects received multiple awards and nominations for production and crew as well as cast. A Soap received the Silver Bear and Best Debut in Berlinale in 2006. In 2009 Heaven's Heart was awarded a Guldbaggen. Spång-produced film Guidance was nominated for the Dragon Award at the Göteborg International Film Festival and the New Talent Award in CPH Pix. Sebbe was nominated for the Dragon Award 2010 and Best First Feature Film at the Berlinale 2010. In 2011 Sebbe won a Guldbagge for Best Picture. Call Girl was awarded four Guldbagge awards as well as several international festival prizes.

Spång's film Cockpit won the award Best film at QX Gaygala 2013. Blowfly park is another film that Spång produced and its leading role Sverrir Gudnason won award for Best actor att Thessaloniki International Film Festival 2014 and Guldbaggen 2015.

The Giant was awarded with multiple prices, e.g. Special Jury price at San Sebastian Film Festival, Guldbaggen Best Picture, Best Script and Best Make-up. 2016. Spångs company Garagefilm International produced Amateurs and won GIFF 2018, Dragon Award för Best Nordic film. Spång co-produced Congo murder that won Best Actor (Tobias Santelmann) at Amanda Awards 2019.

== Filmography ==
Film	Year	Role
Shocking Truth	2000	Post-production supervisor
Ordinary Americans	2001	Producer
Besvärliga människor	2001	Production assistant
Viktor och hans bröder (Viktor and His Brothers)	2002	Producer
Kopps	2003	Production manager/ First assistant director
The Apple Tree	2003	Production manager
Elixir	2004	Producer
Fragile	2004	Special thanks
Zozo	2005	Production coordinator / First Assistant Director
Krama mig	2005	Production coordinator
En fråga om liv och död	2006	Producer
Holly Hallonsten ger igen	2006	Producer
En såpa (A Soap)	2006	Co-producer
Jag förstår inte	2008	Producer
Himlens hjärta (Heaven's Heart)	2008	Executive producer
Äpplet & maske (The Apple and the Worm)	2009	Producer
Behandlingen	2009	Producer
Lidingöligan	2009	Producer
Småvilt	2009	Producer
Sebbe	2010	Producer
Call Girl	2012	Producer
Cockpit	2012	Producer
De närmaste	2012	Producer
Flugparken (Blowfly Park)	2013	Producer
Pioneer	2013	Co-producer
Nånting måste gå sönder	2014	Executive producer
Det vita folket	2015	Executive producer
I Remember When I Die	2015	Executive producer
Golden Girl	2016	Producer
Jätten	2016	Executive producer
Skuggdjur	2017	Executive producer
Charmören	2017	Co-producer
Smågodis, katter och lite våld	2018	Executive producer
Hjärtat	2018	Producer
Amatörer	2018	Executive producer
Morden i Kongo	2018	Co-producer
Suicide Tourist	2019	Co-producer
Ring Mamma!	2019	Executive producer
Psykos i Stockholm	2020	Executive producer

== Bibliography ==
- European Film Promotion (2011), Mimmi Spång Producers on the Move Retrieved 2014-03-11
- Film & TV Producenterna (2011), Mimmi Spång och Rebecka Lafrenz – Årets Producers on the Move i Cannes Retrieved 2014-03-10
- Glenngård, Susanne (2007), Intervju med Mimmi Spång Retrieved 2014-03-10
- Resare, Nils (2012), Jasplan säljs med svenska filmsuccéer, Dagens Nyheter, 2012-10-16 Retrieved 2014-03-10
- Svenska Dagbladet (2012), Det finns stora förutsättningar för åtal, 2012-11-12 Retrieved 2014-03-10
- Svensk Filmdatabas (2014), Mimmi Spång Retrieved 2014-02-28
