= Tarik Saleh =

Swedish film director (born 1972)

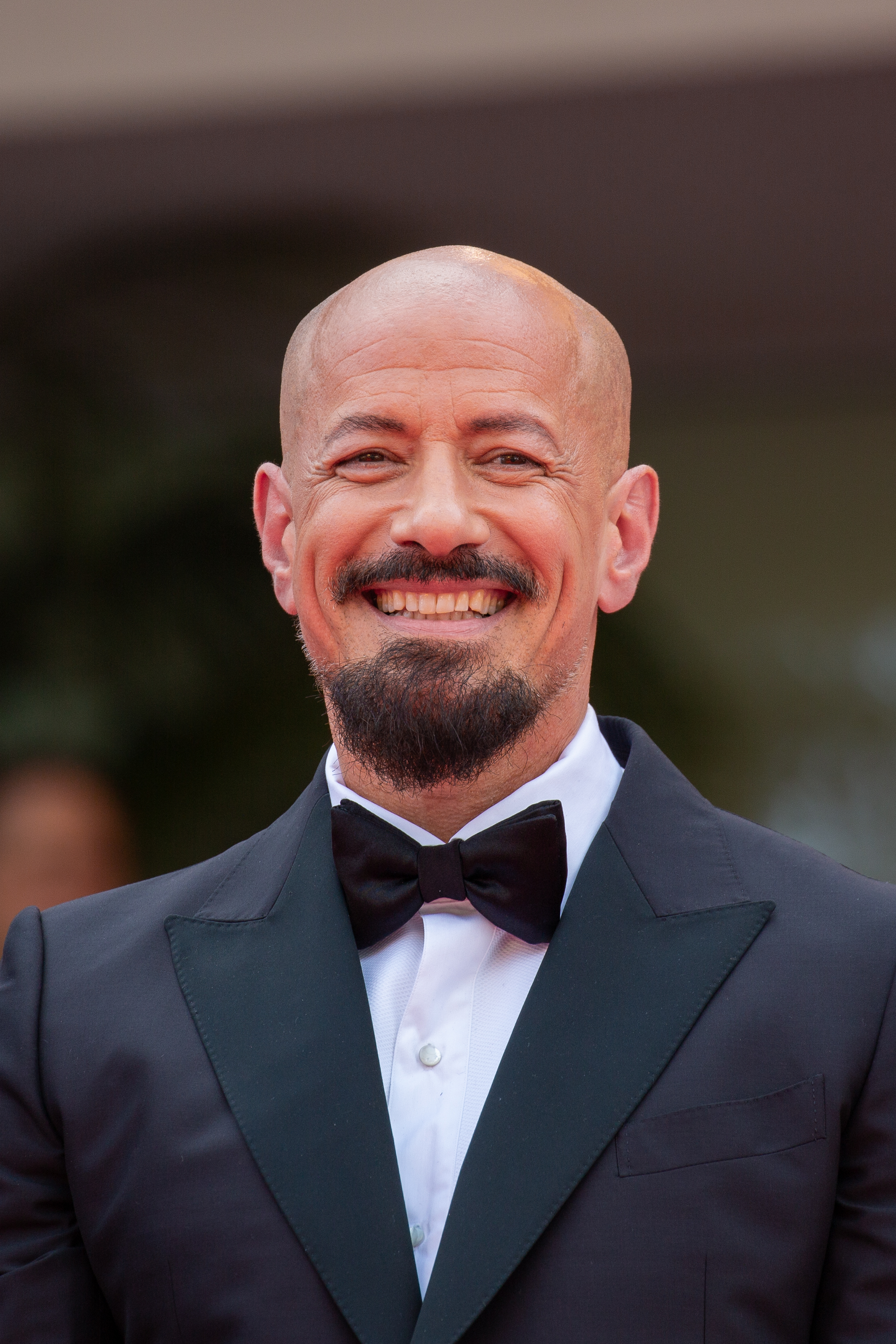
- Saleh at the 2025 Cannes Film Festival.
- Born: 28 January 1972 (age 53); Stockholm, Sweden
- Occupations: Television producer, animator, publisher, journalist, film director
- Years active: 2009–present

Tarik Saleh (Arabic: طارق صالح; born 28 January 1972) is a Swedish television producer, animator, publisher, journalist, and film director. He was born in Stockholm to a Swedish mother and an Egyptian father. He is most known for his Cairo-trilogy starring Fares Fares: The Nile Hilton Incident (2017), Boy from Heaven (2022) and Eagles of the Republic (2025).

== Career ==
In the late 1980s and early 1990s, he was one of Sweden's most prominent graffiti artists, including co-creating Fascinate. He has also worked as a TV host for Sveriges Television and is one of the founders of production company Atmo.

Saleh first feature film, the English-language animated film Metropia (2009), had its world premiere at the 66th Venice International Film Festival.

His 2017's The Nile Hilton Incident was awarded World Cinema Grand Jury Prize: Dramatic at the 2017 Sundance Film Festival, and went to win numerous awards including Best Film at the 53rd Guldbagge Awards.

In 2022, he directed his first Hollywood production, The Contractor, starring Chris Pine, Ben Foster and Gillian Jacobs. The film was initially acquired by STXfilms, but due to the company's financial struggles that year, the film U.S. rights were sold to Paramount Pictures and Showtime. Paramount released the film in a simultaneous limited theatrical and premium video-on-demand release on April 1, 2022. The film was released internationally by Prime Video as an Amazon Original.

Also in 2022, Saleh released the second installment of his "Cairo triology", Boy from Heaven, which had its world premiere at the main competition of the 2022 Cannes Film Festival, winning the Best Screenplay award and the François Chalais Prize. It was selected as the Swedish entry for the Best International Feature Film at the 95th Academy Awards, and made the december 15-films shortlist, but was not nominated. At the 48th César Awards it was nominated for Best Foreign Film.

His final entry in the "Cairo triology", Eagles of the Republic, had its world premiere at the main competition of the 2025 Cannes Film Festival, where it was nominated for the Palme d'Or.

== Filmography ==
=== Feature films ===
Year	English title	Original title	Notes
2009	Metropia		
2014	Tommy		
2017	The Nile Hilton Incident	حادث النيل هيلتون	
2022	The Contractor		
2022	Boy from Heaven	صبي من الجنة	Best Screenplay at the 75th Cannes Film Festival
2025	Eagles of the Republic		

=== Documentary films ===
- Sacrificio: Who Betrayed Che Guevara (2001)
- Gitmo: The New Rules of War (2005)

=== Television ===
- Westworld (2018)
- Ray Donovan (2018)

=== Music videos ===
- Sadness is a Blessing: Lykke Li (2011)
- Lykke Li - "I Follow Rivers" (2011)
- Lykke Li - "No Rest for the Wicked" (2014)
