= List of Swedish films of the 2020s =

This is a list of films produced in Sweden and in the Swedish language in the 2020s.

== Films ==
English title	Swedish title	Director	Cast	Genre	Notes
2020
Another Round	Druk	Thomas Vinterberg	Mads Mikkelsen, Thomas Bo Larsen, Magnus Millang, Lars Ranthe	Comedy-drama	Denmark-Sweden-Netherlands coproduction
Sweat		Magnus von Horn		Drama	
2021
Costa Brava, Lebanon	Costa Brava, Libanon	Mounia Akl	Nadine Labaki, Saleh Bakri, Nadia Charbel	Drama	International coproduction
Farha		Darin J. Sallam	Karam Taher, Ashraf Barhom, Ali Suliman	Drama	International coproduction
Flee	Flykt	Jonas Poher Rasmussen		Documentary	International coproduction
Successful Thawing of Mr. Moro	Lyckad upptining av herr Moro	Jerry Carlsson		Short	
Sundown		Michel Franco	Tim Roth, Charlotte Gainsbourg, Iazua Larios	Drama	Mexico, France, Sweden coproduction
2022
Godland		Hlynur Pálmason	Elliott Crosset Hove, Ingvar Eggert Sigurðsson	Drama	Iceland, Denmark, France, Sweden coproduction
Holy Spider		Ali Abbasi	Mehdi Bajestani, Zar Amir Ebrahimi	Thriller	Denmark, Germany, Sweden, France coproduction
Salt Lake		Kasia Rosłaniec			
Triangle of Sadness		Ruben Östlund	Harris Dickinson, Charlbi Dean, Dolly de Leon, Zlatko Burić, Iris Berben	Black comedy	
2023
Opponent	Motståndaren	Milad Alami	Payman Maadi, Marall Nasiri, Björn Elgerd	Drama	
Shame on Dry Land	Syndabocken	Axel Petersén	Joel Spira, Christopher Wagelin, Julia Sporre, Jacqueline Ramel, Michal Axel Piotrowski, Tommy Nilsson	Drama	
Together 99	Tillsammans 99	Lukas Moodysson		Comedy	Sequel to Together (Tillsammans)
Unicorns		Sally El Hosaini, James Krishna Floyd			US-UK-Sweden coproduction
2024
Deck 5B	Däck 5B	Malin Ingrid Johansson	Alma Pöysti, Krister Kern, Enar Malbert	Short drama	
The Last Journey	Den sista resan	Filip Hammar and Fredrik Wikingsson	Filip Hammar, Fredrik Wikingsson, Lars Hammar	Documentary	Highest-grossing Swedish documentary film in history
Julie Keeps Quiet (Julie zwijgt)	Julies tystnad	Leonardo Van Dijl	Tessa Van den Broeck, Ruth Becquart, Koen De Bouw, Claire Bodson, Laurent Caron	Psychological, Drama	Belgium-Sweden coproduction
2025
The Dance Club		Lisa Langseth	Nils Wetterholm, Alva Bratt, Evelyn Mok, Matias Varela, Julia Franzén, Marina Kereklidou, Mikael Jaldeby, Matilda Ekström	Romantic comedy	In co-production with Norway
Eagles of the Republic		Tarik Saleh	Fares Fares, Lyna Khoudri, Amr Waked, Zineb Triki, Husam Chadat, Ahmed Khairy, Cherien Dabis, Donia Massoud, Sherwan Haji, Tamim Heikal, Suhaib Nashwan, Tamer Singer, Ahmad Diab	Political thriller	In co-production with France, Denmark and Finland
2026
The Swedish Connection	Den svenska länken	Thérèse Ahlbeck and Marcus Olsson	Henrik Dorsin, Sissela Benn, Jonas Karlsson, Jonas Malmsjö, Marianne Mörck, Johan Glans, Richard Ulfsäter, Stefan Gödicke, Christoffer Nordenrot	World War II drama	
A-Men to That		Rafael Edholm	Marcus Schenkenberg, Knut Berggren, Rafael Edholm, Anna Sahlene	Comedy	
