= Ferry Lina =

Swedish passenger ferry

Färjan Lina (Ferry Lina)
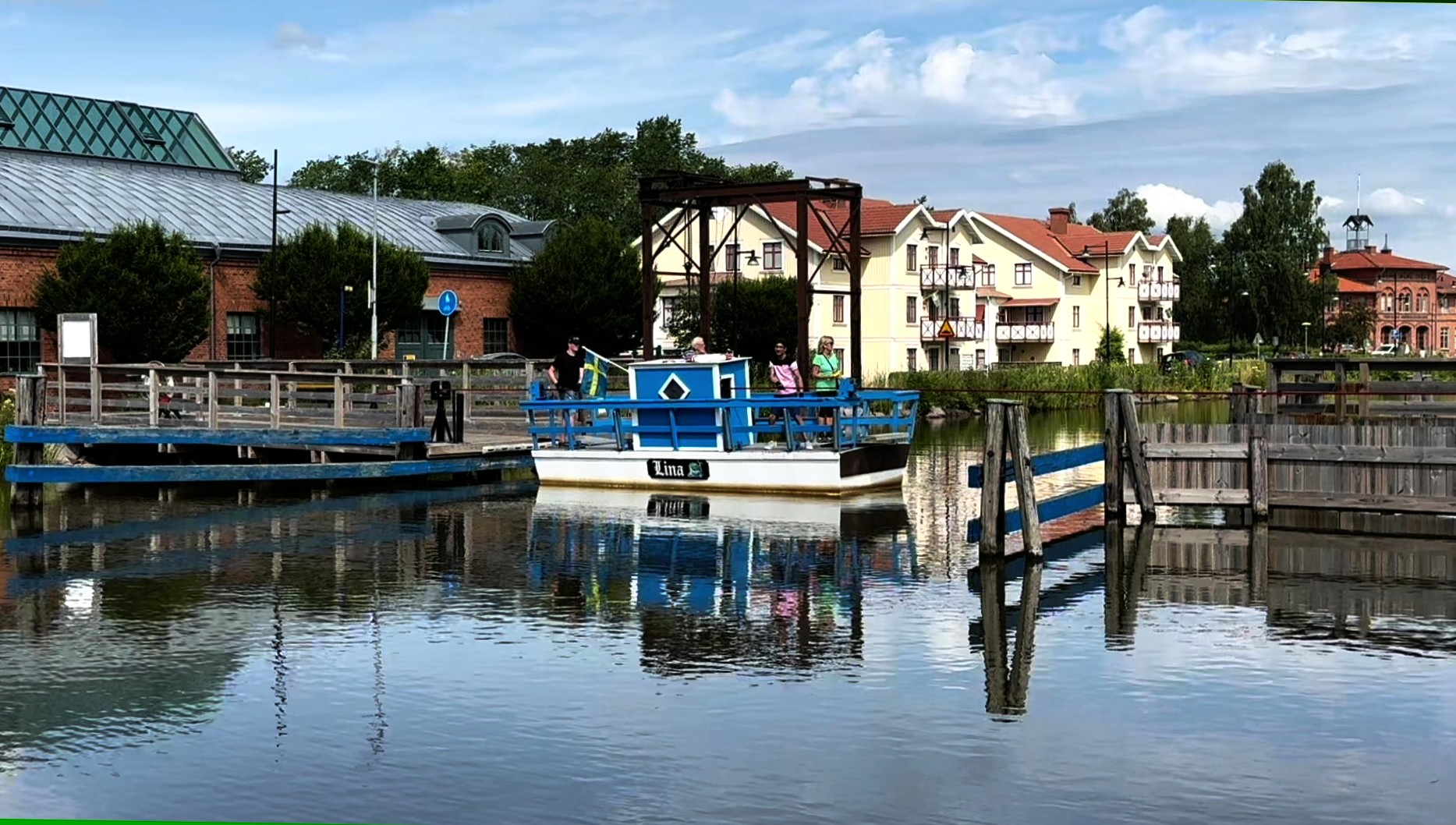
- Locale: Töreboda kommun
- Transit type: Passenger ferry
- Operator: Töreboda kommun
- Began operation: 1919
- System length: 25 meters
- No. of lines: 1
- No. of vessels: 1

Ferry Lina (Färjan Lina) is the world's shortest regular ferry. It crosses the Göta Canal, in Sweden, taking about 25–30 seconds to do so. The ferry is powered by pulling a rope that must be lowered when a boat is passing. It appears in the Swedish comedy movie Göta kanal 3.

== History ==
The ferry line was opened in 1919 by the retired locomotive driver Oskar Lindhult because of a new district in Töreboda on the other side of the canal. Before the ferry line opened, the residents needed to use their own boat. In the beginning, the ferry that was used was a wooden boat. At the end of the 1930s, the skipper Färje-Karl (Ferry-Karl) got permission to set up a rope over the canal and then a special ferry was built. In 2019, the ferry line celebrated 100 years of service.
