= Christian Fandango Sundgren =

Swedish actor

- Born: Lars Christian Fandango Sundgren; 14 October 1992 (age 33); Stockholm, Sweden
- Occupation: Actor

Lars Christian Fandango Sundgren (24 October 1992) is a Swedish actor. He is known for his roles in the SVT series Eagles and Blackwater, as well as the Netflix series Barracuda Queens.
