= Ronja, the Robber's Daughter (disambiguation) =

Ronja, the Robber's Daughter is a 1981 children's fantasy book by Swedish author Astrid Lindgren.

Ronja, the Robber's Daughter or Ronia, the Robber's Daughter may also refer to:

- Ronia, the Robber's Daughter (film), a 1984 film based on the book
- Ronja, the Robber's Daughter (2014 TV series), a Japanese animated series
- Ronja, the Robber's Daughter (2024 TV series), a Swedish live-action series
