= Kronprinsen som försvann =

- Country of origin: Sweden
- Original language: Swedish

Original release
- Network: SVT1; SVT Barn; SVT Play
- Release: 1 December – 24 December 2022

Related
- En hederlig jul med Knyckertz (2021); Trolltider – legenden om Bergatrollet (2023)

Kronprinsen som försvann (eng. "The Crown Prince who disappeared") is the 2022 Sveriges Television's Christmas Calendar (SVT). This year's outside shots were filmed on location in Gotland and Hungary, as well as a studio in Stockholm.

== Plot ==
In a Kingdom far up north, a Crown Prince named Carl Wilhelm is in danger of his life and forced to escape from the royal castle when his mother, Queen Lovisa, suddenly disappears. While he is hiding, he meets a girl named Hilda. She helps him to hide by establishing him as an orphanage boy named Ville.

== Roles ==
- Kerstin Linden – the poor girl Hilda
- Xavier Canca-Englund – crown prince Carl Wilhelm Gyllencrona / the poor boy Ville
- Arvin Kananian – the fool Amir, friend of the crown prince
- Dilan Gwyn – queen Lovisa
- Anton Lundqvist – Lieutenant Silverdufva
- Maria Lundqvist – Nanni, Hildas grandmother
- Valter Toverud – little brother
- Dag Malmberg – general Leijongap
- Sissela Benn – chamber maid
- Alva Bratt – the duchess Augustina, the crown prince's cousin
- Magnus Sundberg – Rask
- Christoffer Nordenrot – Frisk
- Sissela Kyle – the national judge
- Joel Spira – Torsten
- Alejandra Goic Albornoz – Maria
- Jonatan Rodriguez – Edward
- Torbjörn Averås Skorup – servant
- Rozbeh Ganjali – guard captain
- Rojan Telo – guard
- Tina Pour Davoy – antique dealer
- Annika Hallin – lunch guest
- Lennart Jähkel – Storyteller
