= Mike Chen =

Chinese-born American YouTuber

- Born: Chen Xing; 1980 or 1981 (age 44–45); Xi'an, China
- Education: Truman State University
- Occupation: YouTuber
- Years active: 2006–present

YouTube information
- Channels: Strictly Dumpling; Beyond Science; Mike Chen
- Genres: Educational; Vlog; travelogue
- Subscribers: 8.62 million (combined)
- Views: 1.67 billion (combined)

Chen Xing
- Traditional Chinese: 陳興
- Simplified Chinese: 陈兴
Transcriptions
Standard Mandarin
- Hanyu Pinyin: Chén Xīng
- IPA: [ʈʂʰə̌n ɕíŋ]
- Last updated: May 9, 2022
- Website: www.shopmikeychen.com

Chen Xing (born 1980 or 1981), better known as Mike "Mikey" Xing Chen, is a Chinese-born American YouTuber. A former staff member of New Tang Dynasty Television's YouTube channel Off the Great Wall, Chen is notable for his YouTube channel Strictly Dumpling, a series of vlogs focusing on food and travel. In addition to running Strictly Dumpling, Chen also runs the YouTube channels Cook With Mikey (previously Pho the Love of Food), Eat With Mikey, Beyond Science, Mike Chen, The Chen Dynasty (previously The Double Chen Show), and The CheNews (previously The Double Chen News). Chen has over 5 million subscribers on all of his YouTube channels combined.

== Early life ==
Chen was born in Xi'an, China and moved to the United States when he was 8 years old. He grew up in the American Midwest, working at the Chinese buffets that his parents owned.

In a Reddit AMA, Chen stated he attended Truman State University, where he majored in accounting with intentions of becoming an agent for the Federal Bureau of Investigation. During his time there, he also served as a resident assistant. After graduating from college, he worked at Morgan Stanley as a financial analyst but left after a year in 2006.

== Career ==
Once Chen departed from Morgan Stanley, he worked as the head of digital strategy at the non-profit media company New Tang Dynasty Television. Chen cites his reason as being a practitioner of Falun Gong, and he had wanted to promote awareness of human rights violations in China. While working at the company, he worked part-time filming weddings to earn income.

Under New Tang Dynasty Television, Chen co-created the YouTube channel Off the Great Wall, a channel discussing Chinese culture, with several other employees. In 2013, Chen began making vlogs about food, which eventually led him to create multiple YouTube channels dedicated to food vlogs, such as Cook With Mikey (previously Pho the Love of Food), Eat With Mikey, and Strictly Dumpling. In addition, he also runs Beyond Science, a video series discussing strange phenomena, as well as his personal channel, Mike Chen.

In 2015, Chen left New Tang Dynasty Television and Off the Great Wall with his co-worker, Dan Chen, citing creative differences. Chen and Dan then created the YouTube channel The Double Chen Show. The two, along with Yi Yang, moved from New York to San Francisco, California. In addition, Chen, Dan, and Yang created The Double Chen News (commentary on current events in China) and Awesome Toy Review! (toy reviews) as sub-channels. In 2016, Dan and Yang left all three channels to return to New York, while Chen continued The Double Chen Show and The Double Chen News, rebranding them as The Chen Dynasty and The CheNews respectively based on fan suggestions.

In 2019, Chen was nominated under the Best in Food category for the 11th Shorty Awards. He also announced he plans on opening Karne, a Korean steakhouse, in Dallas, Texas.

== Personal life ==
Chen lived in New York while working with New Tang Dynasty Television, but after leaving in 2015, he moved to San Francisco, California. After living in Seattle, Washington, Chen revealed that he moved to Allen, Texas, in 2021. Chen married Christine Ahn on July 12, 2021 in Las Vegas, Nevada. A Legal Separation was filed by Christine Ahn against Chen in September 4, 2025, including a note on the filing of a temporary restraining order.

Chen is a practitioner of Falun Gong and cites it as a reason why he started doing non-profit work with New Tang Dynasty Television. Chen is also an outspoken critic of the Chinese Communist Party, accusing them of various human rights violations such as the 1989 Tiananmen Square protests and massacre and the persecution of Uyghurs, Christians, and Falun Gong practitioners. Due to his views on the Chinese Communist Party, in 2021, comedian Nigel Ng deleted their video collaboration and apologized on Weibo for not realizing Chen's remarks about China.
