= Nigel Ng =

Malaysian comedian and YouTuber (born 1991)

- 黃瑾瑜
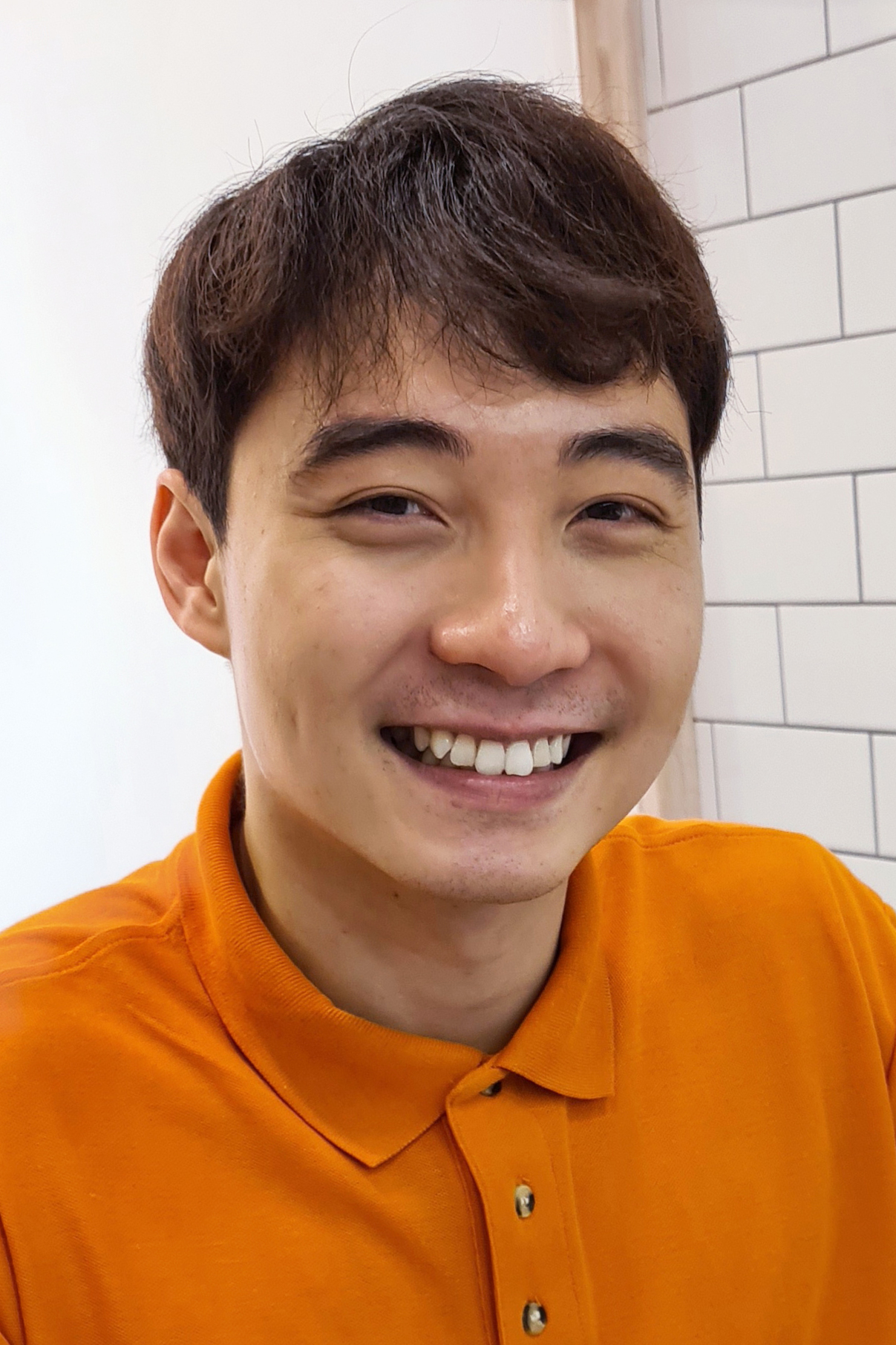
- Ng as Uncle Roger in 2020
- Born: March 15, 1991 (age 35); Kuala Lumpur, Malaysia
- Other names: Uncle Roger; Nephew Nigel
- Education: Northwestern University
- Occupations: Comedian; YouTuber
- Spouse: Sabrina Ahmed (m. 2025) (Note: Second wife; the identity of his first wife is not publicly known.)
- Children: 1

YouTube information
- Channel: mrnigelng
- Years active: 2012–present
- Subscribers: 10.7 million
- Views: 2.151 billion

Chinese name
- Traditional Chinese: 黃瑾瑜
- Simplified Chinese: 黄瑾瑜
Transcriptions
Standard Mandarin
- Hanyu Pinyin: Huáng Jǐnyú
Yue: Cantonese
- Jyutping: Wong4 Gan2-jyu4
Southern Min
- Hokkien POJ: N̂g Kín-jû
- Last updated: August 29, 2026
- Website: mrnigelng.com

Nigel Ng (/ʌŋ/ UNG; Chinese: 黃瑾瑜; born March 15, 1991) is a Chinese Malaysian comedian and YouTuber best known for co-creating (alongside Evelyn Mok) and portraying Uncle Roger, a fictionalized alter ego of himself, representing a stereotypical middle-aged Asian uncle with an accent who is often seen critiquing Westerners' attempts at cooking Asian food. Uncle Roger's accent is modeled on Nigel Ng's own accent in his years living in Malaysia.

== Early life ==
Nigel Ng was born in Kuala Lumpur on March 15, 1991, the son of Malaysian Chinese parents of Hokkien ancestry. His mother is a homemaker, while his father is a car salesman. Ng, his sister, and his brother grew up in the Cheras district with their parents. After graduating from Chong Hwa Independent High School in 2009, he moved to the U.S. to study at Northwestern University. He majored in engineering and minored in philosophy, graduating in 2014.

== Career ==
=== Early work ===
Ng previously worked as a data scientist at Monzo and maintained a GitHub account. Inspired to pursue a comedy career in part by the work of Hong Kong comedy actor Stephen Chow, he made his TV debut in 2018 on Comedy Central's Stand Up Central. He hosted the comedy podcasts Rice to Meet You with UK-based Swedish comedian Evelyn Mok. and HAIYAA with Nigel Ng with his producer Matt. On January 2, 2021, he uploaded his first video on the Chinese video sharing website Bilibili. In 2021, he appeared on the first episode of the 19th series of British comedy show Mock the Week.

=== Uncle Roger ===
Ng is best known for his comedic alter ego Uncle Roger, representing an old fashioned and chauvinistic Chinese uncle who speaks with a Malaysian accent and prides himself on various lost generation Chinese stereotypes. His podcast partner Evelyn Mok came up with the middle-aged Asian uncle character for a sitcom with Ng in mind, and Ng further developed the character on TikTok and Instagram sketches before moving the character onto YouTube.

In July 2020, Ng attracted attention for an Uncle Roger video critiquing Hersha Patel's BBC Food video on cooking egg-fried rice. After the video went viral, Ng and Patel appeared on BBC Food together and collaborated on a YouTube video. In August, he spent a day working in Elizabeth Haigh's restaurant, Mei Mei. The following month, he posted a critique video with regards to Gordon Ramsay's fried rice and praised Ramsay for having the correct technique. He has released numerous videos critiquing Jamie Oliver's versions of popular Asian dishes such as egg fried rice, Thai green curry, ramen, and pho.

Ng was a special guest on second season of MasterChef Singapore in 2021, and a guest judge on the third season of Junior MasterChef Indonesia in 2022. That same year, he was a guest diner on the 21st season of Hell's Kitchen. He has also collaborated with numerous entertainers and food personalities including Esther Choi, Joshua Weissman, Chef Rush, Andy Hearnden, Nick DiGiovanni, Steven He, Simu Liu, Jimmy O. Yang, Benny Blanco, Martin Yan, and Gordon Ramsay.

Uncle Roger (Nigel Ng) appeared with Playdash (Playdash Entertainment / Playdash Media) as a special guest during Tokyo Auto Salon Malaysia 2026 (TASM2026) in October 2026.

On 3 November 2026, Ng released his first cookbook together with Jenn Garbee titled Don’t Mess Up Your Rice: 70 Recipes to Impress Uncle Roger, featuring a foreword by Gordan Ramsay.

== Reception ==
Ng won the Amused Moose Laugh-Off 2016 and was runner-up in the Laughing Horse New Act of the Year 2015. He was also a finalist in the Leicester Mercury Comedian of the Year (2016) and Leicester Square New Comedian of the Year (2015). He was nominated for the "Best Newcomer Award" for his stand-up comedy show at the Edinburgh Fringe Festival in 2019.

The accent Ng uses for the Uncle Roger character has received criticism for perpetuating negative stereotypes about Asians. Chef J. Kenji López-Alt (who is Japanese-American) said, "I don't like that [Ng's] schtick seems to give a free pass to people to imitate stereotypical Asian speech patterns and pronunciation, especially as it's almost always non-Asians doing the imitating. It's ugly, it's yellowface, it's not funny, and it promotes anti-Asian racism at a time when Asians are already being heavily discriminated against." In response, Ng has said that simply speaking in an exaggerated accent is not an indication of discriminatory behaviour especially being a Chinese-Malaysian national himself, this highlights the difference in the perception of Asian stereotypes between Asians living in Asia and Asian Americans. In a February 2026 video, Ng, as Uncle Roger, stated he is proud of his accent and the diffusion of Malaysian culture.

His critique video of Patel's egg-fried rice has been described as making the viewers "fall for every cultural 'trap' his character sets", overlooking the differences of rice cooking methods in Indian cuisine, and turning East and Southeast Asians into "rice-cooking supremacists" with his "faux encouragement".

On January 12, 2021, Ng apologized on the Chinese social media platform Weibo and deleted a video featuring fellow YouTuber Mike Chen, who had been critical of the Chinese Communist Party and had also been associated with Falun Gong. He stated, "This video has made a bad social impact... I wasn't aware of his political thoughts and his past incorrect remarks about China. I hope you can give Uncle Roger, who has just entered China, a chance to improve!" His response attracted criticism on Twitter. In his first subsequent video as Uncle Roger, he said he would "keep making funny videos [...] no politics, no drama".

On July 30, 2023, Ng stated in an Uncle Roger video, "Not all Southeast Asia has good food. You don't want food from Laos and Cambodia." He also jokingly described Laotian food as an inferior version of Thai food, causing criticism and backlash from both Laotian and Cambodian communities. In a response video to Laotian chef Ae Southammavong challenging him to try Laotian food she had cooked, Ng accepted the challenge and explained his comments by saying, "All the Laos food I had so far... not my favourite. Asian people criticizing other Asian people is just a way of life." Cambodia's Ministry of Tourism issued a statement condemning Ng's remarks as damaging to the image of its cuisine and demanding an apology. The Embassy of Malaysia in Phnom Penh distanced Malaysia from Ng's remarks, saying that "[t]hey do not in any way reflect our view".

Ng has stated that he does not want any of his viewers to spread hate towards anyone.

On May 22, 2023, it was reported that Ng's Bilibili and Weibo accounts had been closed down in response to perceived criticism of China's government in his stand-up comedy special for the phrase "this Nephew using Huawei phone, they all listening."

== Business ventures ==
=== Fuiyoh! It's Uncle Roger ===
FUIYOH! It's UNCLE ROGER
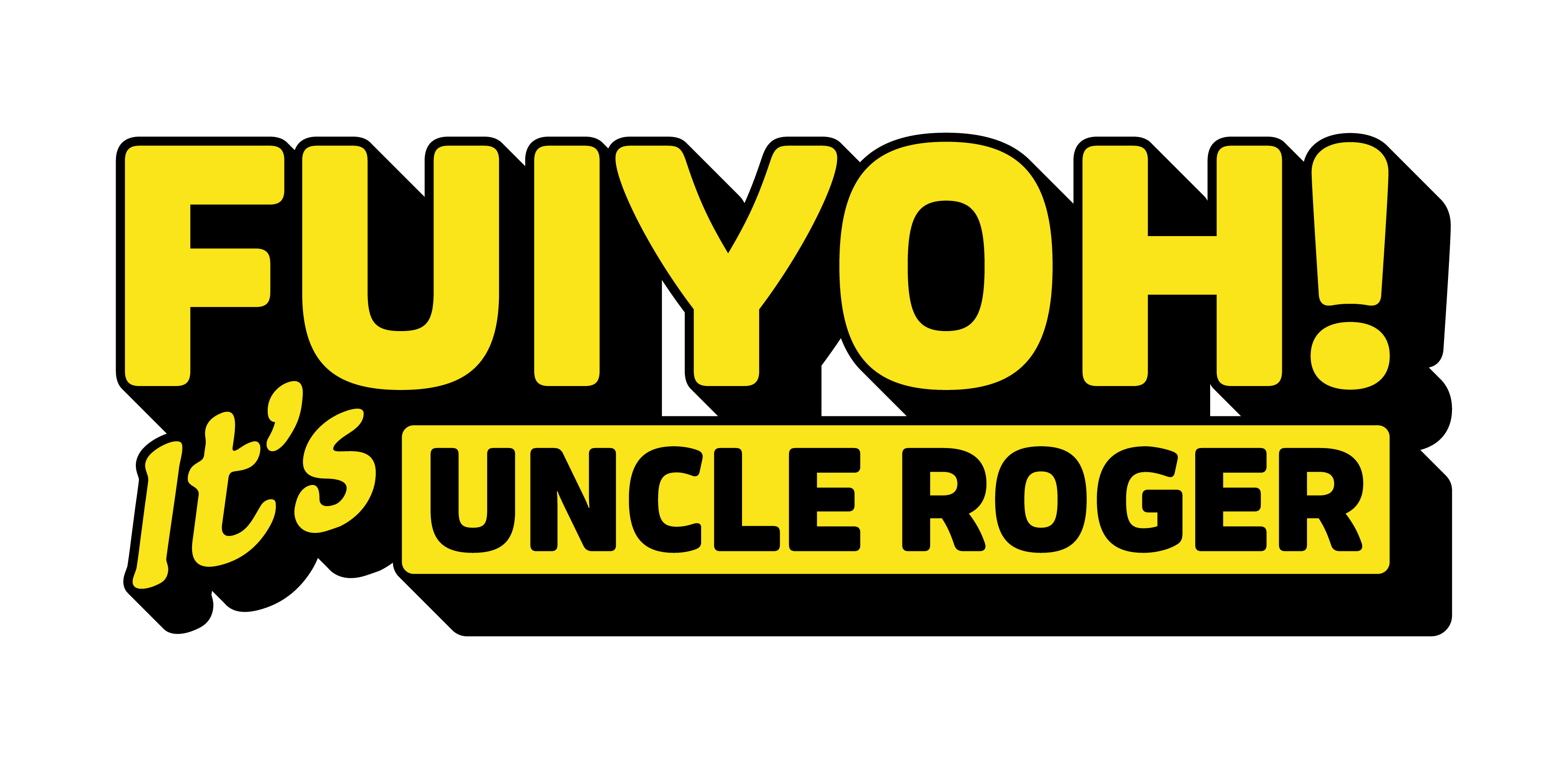

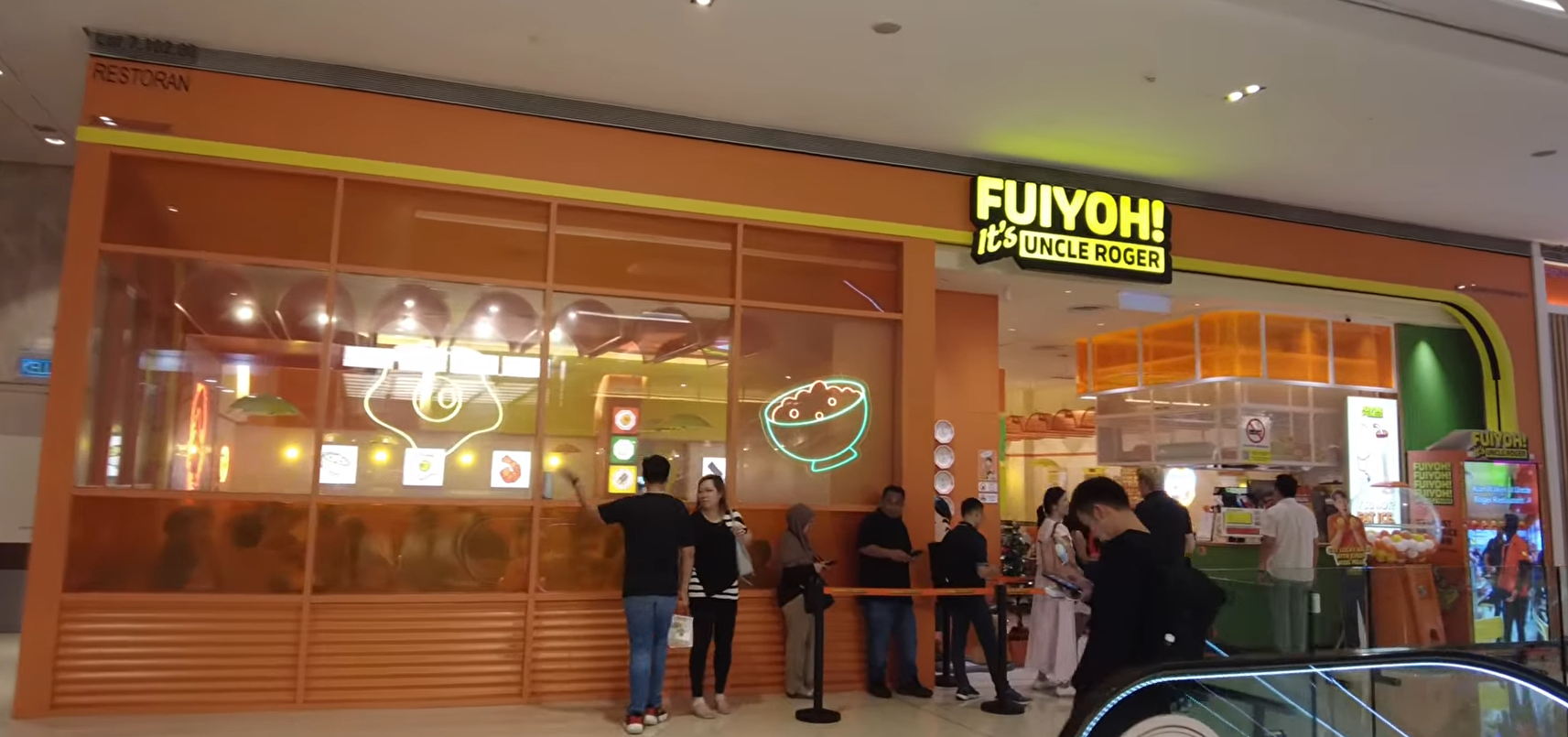
- Exterior of the first restaurant of the chain at Pavilion Kuala Lumpur, c. 2025

Restaurant information
- Established: 2024
- Food type: Chinese-Malaysian fusion cuisine

On September 11, 2024, Ng launched his first restaurant "Fuiyoh! It's Uncle Roger" at Pavilion Kuala Lumpur. On September 14, 2024, as a promotion event for his new restaurant, Ng convened his followers to dress as Uncle Roger outside there. This event broke the Guinness World Record for "Largest gathering of people dressed as Uncle Roger" with 388 participants. On the same day, he broke another Guinness World Record for "Most fried rice tossed and caught with a ladle in 30 seconds". The second restaurant, located at IPC Shopping Centre, was opened to the public in November 2024. He mentioned that he had plans to expand in Asia and then further into Western countries such as Australia, the United Kingdom and the United States.

In March 2026, the company announced that it will permanently close the IPC Shopping Centre branch, citing venue and menu issues and having to lean its operations.

=== Kawan by Uncle Roger ===
Kawan by Uncle Roger
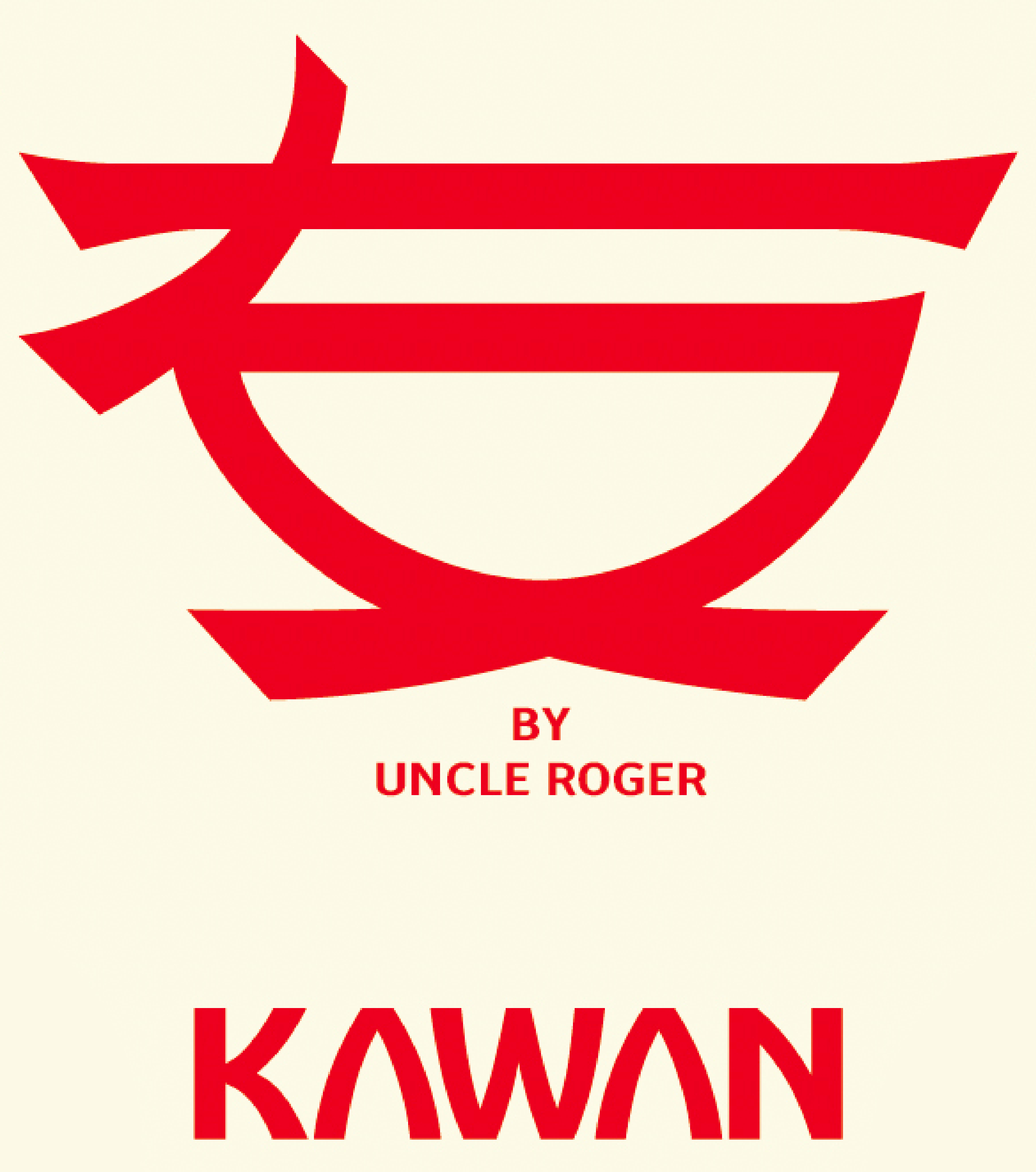

Restaurant information
- Established: 2026
- Food type: Asian fusion cuisine

The restaurant, sited in London's Chinatown, is a joint venture between Ng, Keng Yew, and Daren Liew. The restaurant was originally set to open in April 2026. In March 2026, Ng announced that the opening was moved to May 2026 after a shipment delay of the restaurant's furniture and equipment due to the ongoing Iran war.

=== Playdash ===
PlayDash (especially known through PlayDash Entertainment / PlayDash Media, managed by Dato Combat)has collaborated with Uncle Roger (Nigel Ng) on advertising and event campaigns., such as at the Tokyo Auto Salon Malaysia 2026.

== Personal life ==
Growing up, Mandarin Chinese was Ng's first language. His sister is a musician.

Ng lived in Hammersmith in London. In 2020, he discussed being the victim of an anti-Asian assault while living there.

Ng divorced his first wife. In 2025, he married Sabrina Ahmed.

In 2023, Ng moved to Los Angeles, California. At the end of 2024, he announced he was engaged to Sabrina Ahmed and proposed to her in Japan during the sakura festival, restating he was living in Los Angeles. They married on July 19, 2025, in Sintra, Portugal. The three-day wedding celebration combined Chinese and Bengali traditions.
