= Emil Almén =

Swedish actor

Lars Emil Almén (born 30 June 1980 in Sala, Sweden) is a Swedish actor. He studied at Skara Skolscen and at the Swedish National Academy of Mime and Acting. Now he works at Stockholm City Theatre.

== Filmography ==
Year	Title	Role	Notes
2005	Coachen	Jacek	3 episodes
2006	God Willing	Bachelor #3	
2006	Göta kanal 2 – Kanalkampen	Pyrotekniker	
2007	En riktig jul	Tekniknisse	8 episodes
2007	August	Penny-a-liner	TV movie
2008	Oskyldigt dömd	Mårten Sandgren	1 episode
2009	Vägen hem	Pastor Helge Fossmo	
2009	The Girl with the Dragon Tattoo	Police officer	
2010	Beck	Gestalten	Episode: "Levande begravd"
2013	Crimes of Passion	Connie	TV movie
2013–2014	Äkta människor	Einar	6 episodes
2014	Nånting måste gå sönder	Man på bar	
2015	Det vita folket	Franz	
2016–2019	Gåsmamman (TV Series)	Kevin	21 episodes
2020	The Machinery	Jack Harding	8 episodes
2021	A Class Apart	Kenneth Nyman	5 episodes
2023	Estonia	Oscar Berg	3 episodes
