= Barracuda Queens =

Swedish heist drama television series (2023–present)

- Promotional poster
- Genre: Heist drama; Teen drama
- Created by: Camilla Ahlgren; Frida Asp; Fatima Varhos
- Written by: Camilla Ahlgren; Sofie Forsman; Tove Forsman; Veronica Zacco
- Directed by: Amanda Adolfsson
- Starring: Alva Bratt; Tea Stjärne; Tindra Monsen; Sandra Zubovic; Sarah Gustafsson; Izabella Scorupco
- Composer: Joakim Åhlund
- Country of origin: Sweden
- Original language: Swedish
- No. of seasons: 2
- No. of episodes: 12

Production
- Producers: Frida Asp; Fatima Varhos
- Cinematography: Ragna Jorming
- Running time: 26–34 minutes
- Production company: Asp Varhos

Original release
- Network: Netflix
- Release: 5 June 2023 – present

Barracuda Queens is a Swedish heist drama television series. The first season was released on Netflix on 5 June 2023. The second season was released on 5 June 2025.

== Premise ==
After spending all of their money on partying, a group of four upper-class teenagers begin burglarizing homes in Djursholm.

== Cast ==
- Alva Bratt as Lollo Millkvist
- Tea Stjärne as Mia Thorstensson
- Tindra Monsen as Klara Rapp
- Sandra Zubovic as Frida Rapp
- Sarah Gustafsson as Amina Khalil
- Izabella Scorupco as Margareta Millkvist
- Johannes Bah Kuhnke as Claes Rapp
- Carsten Bjørnlund as Lars Millkvist
- Max Ulveson as Calle Millkvist
- Mirja Turestedt as Viveca Rapp
- Editha Domingo as Trisha
- Meliz Karlge as Laila Khalil
- Michaela Thorsén as Cecilia Thorstensson
- Gino Estéra as Farshid Khalil
- Richard Forsgren as Magnus Thorstensson
- David Book as Carl-Johan von Schmigel
- Christian Fandango Sundgren as Tobias

== Episodes ==
=== Series overview ===
Series	Episodes	Originally released
1	6	5 June 2023
2	6	5 June 2025

=== Season 1 ===
No. in season	Title	Duration	Original release date
1	"I Regret Båstad" (Fan vad jag ångrar Båstad)	34 min	5 June 2023
2	"You're a Girl, It's Different" (Du är ju tjej, det är annorlunda)	32 min	5 June 2023
3	"I Want More Money" (Jag vill ha mer pengar)	31 min	5 June 2023
4	"Cheers to Never Fighting Again" (Skål för att vi aldrig ska bli ovänner mer)	32 min	5 June 2023
5	"I'm Not Scared of You!" (Jag är inte rädd för dig!)	31 min	5 June 2023
6	"Do You Like Champagne?" (Gillar du champagne?)	33 min	5 June 2023

=== Season 2 ===
No. in season	Title	Duration	Original release date
1	"I Can't Live in That Mad House" (Jag kan inte bo i det där dårhuset)	28 min	5 June 2025
2	"We'll Never Be Able to Afford the Apartment" (Vi kommer aldrig ha råd med våningen)	27 min	5 June 2025
3	"I'm So Tired of Being Poor" (Jag är väldigt trött på att vara fattig)	30 min	5 June 2025
4	"Did They Take Our Painting?" (Tog de vår tavla?)	28 min	5 June 2025
5	"I Drugged Niklas" (Jag har drogat Niklas)	26 min	5 June 2025
6	"You Know That Hair in Jesper's Car" (Du vet det där hårstråt i Jespers bil)	29 min	5 June 2025

== Production ==
The series is loosely based on the real-life Lidingö League, a group of men who burglarized houses in Lidingö and Danderyd. Production began in June 2022.

== Release ==
In March 2024, the series was renewed for a second season, set to premiere in 2025. The second season was released on 5 June 2025.
