= A Class Apart =

Swedish television drama series

- Also known as: Zebrarummet
- Genre: Drama
- Created by: Henrik Schyffert, Gustaf Skördeman
- Screenplay by: Michaela Hamilton; Erik Eger; Gustaf Skördeman; Anna Platt; Fredrik Agetoft
- Directed by: Andrea Östlund; David Berron; Erik Eger
- Starring: Valter Skarsgård; Aliette Opheim; Edvin Endre; Amanda Lindh; Alva Bratt; Tiam Miladi; Anton Forsdik
- Country of origin: Sweden
- Original language: Swedish
- No. of seasons: 1
- No. of episodes: 8

Production
- Running time: 42 minutes
- Production companies: Banijay Rights, Jarowskij Productions

Original release
- Network: Viaplay
- Release: 22 August 2021

A Class Apart or Zebrarummet (literally: The Zebra Room), is a Swedish television drama series, which was broadcast from 22 August 2021 on Viaplay. It was created by Henrik Schyffert and Gustaf Skördeman and directed by Andrea Östlund, David Berron and Erik Eger. Filming occurred from November 2020 in Gothenburg and neighbouring Lerum and Härryda. Global distribution is handled by Banijay Rights for Jarowskij Productions. It was available for streaming on Australia's SBS-TV's On Demand from 2 June 2022.

A Class Apart is largely set in an elite private school, Tuna Kvarn, which has a not-so-secret Zebra Club led by Hugo (Valter Skarsgård) and Caroline (Alva Bratt) with fellow member Philip (Edvin Endre). Their entitled lifestyle includes smoking, drug-taking and promiscuity. Hugo and Caroline initiate new club members Robin (Anton Forsdik) and Nathalie (Amanda Lindh). Sara (Aliette Opheim) is a school counsellor at nearby public school, Holmered, who transfers to Tuna Kvarn. Series creator, Schyffert also portrays Carl, Tuna Kvarn's CEO and Hugo's father.

== Premise ==
At a private boarding school, Tuna Kvarn, there is an old, exclusive, semi-secret Zebra Club. It is currently led by Hugo and Caroline, with fellow members including Philip and William. Two new initiates, Nathalie and Robin, are sworn in: the next day, a dead tuxedo-wearing body is found in the river. The school's elite are silent about their involvement. To save the club's reputation, Caroline, Hugo and Philip foist blame onto nearby Holmered public school's student, Isaac, who supplied Robin with drugs. However, a mobile phone video posted to social media depicts Zebra Club's humiliating initiation rites, which includes the rape of a female student.

Holmered's school counsellor, Sara defends her school's reputation on TV, which draws the attention of Tuna Kvarn's CEO and Hugo's father, Carl. Carl surveills Sara and offers her a job at his school. Sara starts a romance with Carl's friend, Sasha, while secretly investigating the student's death with journalist, Amaya. Hugo pursues Nathalie's affections, while also having sex with other students. Philip's drug habit becomes problematic, while he has a fling with non-club member, Louise. Caroline seduces William. After Isaac's arrest, another video shows Caroline and Robin kissing in the clubroom. Sara and Amaya provide Isaac's alibi as he had appeared at their party. Isaac is released, but charged with drug-related offences. Chief Prosecutor, Dan closes the case, with student's death ruled accidental.

== Cast and characters ==
- Valter Skarsgård as Hugo Ekberg: Carl's son, Tuna Kvarn student, leading Zebra Club member
- Aliette Opheim as Sara Boden: student counsellor at Holmered, then Tuna Kvarn; begins romance with Sasha, later appointed principal
- Edvin Endre as Philip Carnebo: Otto's son, Tuna Kvarn, Zebra Club, Hugo's offsider
- Amanda Lindh as Nathalie Bergmark: Tuna Kvarn, Zebra Club initiate
- Alva Bratt as Caroline Liljekrook: Tuna Kvarn, leading Zebra Club member
- Jesper Söderblom as Sasha: Tuna Kvarn physical education teacher, vice principal; begins romance with Sara
- Wilma Lidén as Louise Fleury: Tuna Kvarn, Grace's friend, has fling with Philip
- Tiam Miladi as William Klingbladh: Tuna Kvarn, Zebra Club
- Henrik Schyffert as Carl Ekberg: Hugo's father, entrepreneurial building contractor, Tuna Kvarn CEO
- Kevin Vaz as Isaac: Holmered student, high absenteeism; local drug dealer; later enrols at Tuna Kvarn
- Nadja Halid as Amaya Johansson: Sara's friend, News Now investigative journalist
- Ella Rappich as Grace: Tuna Kvarn, Louise's friend, play writer
- Aviva Wrede as Nasim Persson: Holmered, Isaac's girlfriend
- Gorki Glaser-Müller as Saïd Ben: police detective investigating student's death
- Lisa Henni as Jovanna Pavic: police detective investigating student's death
- Anna Bjelkerud as Elisabeth: Tuna Kvarn Principal, later replaced by Sara
- Emil Almén as Kenneth Nyman: Robin's father, nouveau riche casino operator
- Filip Slotte as Sebbe: Tuna Kvarn, Zebra Club
- Louise Nyvall as Anja: Tuna Kvarn, Zebra Club
- Jordi Almeida as Jorge: café manager
- Anton Forsdik as Robin Nyman: Kenneth's son, Tuna Kvarn, Zebra Club initiate
- Oskar Thunberg as Rolf: Tuna Kvarn mathematics teacher
- Mattias Nordkvist as Dan Collinder: chief prosecutor, leads student's death investigation
- Filip Berg as Daniel: Sara's former boyfriend, ex-prisoner, ex-drug user
- Adja Krook as Kendra: Holmered student, Nasim's friend
- Kjell Wilhelmsen as Torbjörn: Holmered Principal
- Benjamin Moliner as Otto Carnebo: Philip's father, Charlotte's husband
- Ismail Jallow as Ibbe: Sara's friend

== Episode guide ==
No. in season	Title	Directed by	Written by	Original release date
1	"Superior Lovers" (Erastes Anoteri)	Erik Eger	Fredrik Agetoft, Erik Eger, Anna Platt	22 August 2021
Hugo teases Philip's golf style; Philip snorts up drug. Sara tidies café; Jorge flips burgers. Sara sees Isaac collect bag from truck driver; Hugo picks up Isaac. Caroline walks into Tuna Kvarn. Hugo, Philip watch video; Caroline enters, hands over wine. Kenneth buys watch for Robin. On bus, Sara, sees Isaac boarding; both leave at same stop. Louise welcomes Grace at airport. Hugo, Philip, Caroline observe Robin arrive; they scoff at Kenneth, fellow students. Sara interviews pregnant Nasim; organises appointment with midwife. Hugo chats Nathalie. Caroline greets Nathalie. Torbjörn to Sara: cannot fund special needs teacher. Caroline chooses Robin for initiation; Hugo chooses Nathalie. Sara, Amaya have lunch. Carl organises investors party. Nathalie, Robin enter Zebra Room: swear oath to Erastes Anoteri (Superior Lovers). Club members ask questions: when initiates fail, they drink shot glass. Nathalie embarrassed by sexual questions. Philip orders Robin: collect cocaine. Isaac delivers drugs to Robin. Investors drink, take drugs inside Kvarn. Women dance for investors. Carl's phone shows video of investors with women. Investors have sex with women. William forces Nathalie to drink wine. Caroline watches masked man raping Nathalie. Sara, Amaya party with friends; they see Isaac at party. Next morning: tuxedo-clad corpse in river.
2	"Under the Surface" (Under ytan)	Erik Eger	Fredrik Agetoft, Erik Eger, Anna Platt	22 August 2021
Hugo wakes, vomits. Philip orders younger student: bring energy drink. Police divers recover corpse. People view police from bridge; corpse brought ashore. Hugo, Robin, William miss class. Kenta to Sara: Isaac was wearing tuxedo. Students use mobiles in class; police arrive at Kvarn. Philip wakes Hugo. Nasim to Sara: cannot reach Isaac. Philip wakes William. Police check Robin's bedroom. Elisabeth to Carl: Robin's dead. Carl: do not respond publicly. Elisabeth holds moment of silence at school assembly. Elsewhere, Carl gatecrashes Charles' sales pitch; mocks his financial advice. Torbjörn fronts journalists, who ask about student's death. Sara castigates journalists: ask Kvarn staff instead. Carl promotes own building project. Philip snorts cocaine: William's overwhelmed. Caroline shows Carl, Philip video of Nathalie's rape. They surmise Robin filmed it. Grace, Louise view video. Caroline: deflect Robin's death onto Isaac. Holmered students show Nasim video, who shows Sara. Amaya researches Kvarn historical abuse allegations. Carl asks about viral video; Elisabeth: youth experimenting with sex. Carl watches Opinion Live: Elisabeth promotes her school's achievements. Sara raises sexual assault video. Carl becomes increasingly annoyed by Sara winning arguments against Elisabeth. Carl orders Sasha: investigate Sara. Armed police raid Isaac, friends, who are smoking marijuana. Kenneth identifies Robin's corpse.
3	"Us and Them" (Vi och dom)	Andrea Östlund	Fredrik Agetoft, Michaela Hamilton, Anna Platt	22 August 2021
Hugo to mother: Robin was drunk. Hugo smokes in front of Sasha, but denies it. Policeman finds Robin's ring in school grounds. Sasha placed camera in poolroom. Elisabeth to Carl: school inspectors arriving; removed inappropriate materials. Police arrive first, ask Elisabeth for Zebra Room attendee's list. Nasim learns Isaac's arrested. William to Kenneth: ask Elisabeth for Robin's room key. Sara reviews TV debate. Sara asks Ibbe for assistance with Isaac's case. Sasha suggests: hold interschool race at Holmered. Carl offers Sara: job at Kvarn. Hugo orders junior student, Östlund: floss his teeth. William visits Grace. Grace to Louise: William's messed up. Hugo coaches Zebra Room attendees on what to say to police; hide club rings. Hugo, Caroline have sex. Fellow member to Nathalie: cannot leave club. Police question students in poolroom. Jovanna, Saïd interview Hugo, who's uncooperative: interview halted by lawyer, Regina. Saïd tells Isaac: charged with murder. Another video: Robin describes buying cocaine for Philip; filmed at Kvarn when Isaac was at party with Sara, Amaya. Sasha meets Sara at Jorge's cafe; tries to find out about her. Sara, Sasha kiss. Forensic report: Robin drowned, had alcohol, cocaine in his blood; possibly accidental. William meets Grace. Hugo sees Sasha, Sara return together; tells Carl. Carl watches live video of Sara, Sasha having sex.
4	"Spring Hugo, Spring" (Spring Hugo, spring)	Andrea Östlund	Fredrik Agetoft, Michaela Hamilton, Anna Platt	22 August 2021
Caroline annoyed with her mother, who's moving to America with new husband. Sara wakes, Sasha's outside talking with Hugo. Sara, Torbjörn argue about their disadvantages compared with Kvarn. Nasim meets Isaac upon his release. Elisabeth introduces Jovanna, Saïd to school assembly. Louise, Grace discuss William's recent mood change: now supports Hugo. Louise to police: told Robin, William not to join Zebra Club. Ibbe to Isaac: still facing serious charges; encourages Isaac to run in relay race to improve his image. Both sets of students training for race. Caroline to Hugo: win race, be nicer to Philip. Hugo to police: Caroline, Robin did not have sex. Caroline dines with her father, stepmother. Relay race begins: Anja outruns Nasim, Isaac outruns Hugo, wins race. Philip starts fight with Isaac, both schools' students melee; Sara's injured. Sasha consoles Sara. Carl castigates Elisabeth over after race fracas. Torbjörn berates Sara for fight; orders close supervision. Sara quits, instead. Philip invites Louise for weekend visit. Hugo rebuffs William: plays golf with Philip. Grace, William argue over his behaviour. Carl reviews poolroom footage: hears William planning to leave club. William, Grace have sex. Sara accepts Carl's job offer. Caroline watches video of her cuddling Robin.
5	"Such a Father, Such a Son" (Sådan far, sådan son)	Andrea Östlund	Fredrik Agetoft, Michaela Hamilton, Anna Platt	22 August 2021
Sara address Kvarn assembly: everyone should feel safe. Philip, Hugo sceptically applaud. Carl praises Sara's induction. Hugo rails against Caroline for sex with Robin. Caroline counters: Hugo had sex with more people. Grace to William: avoid Philip's party; club members are racists. Grace, Louise consult Sara: Zebra Club related to Robin's death. Police confer with Dan: William, Hugo both scared. Dan: Robin died accidentally. Sara enters clubroom, but Caroline frostily closes door. Sara takes scrapbook, which depicts masked man, who must be obeyed. Carl was founding member. Caroline to Nathalie: Hugo seduced Anja. Caroline: everyone sleeps around. William, Louise travel to Philip's party. Otto displays valuable snuff boxes. Philip sends Sebbe out of room. Philip, Hugo snort drug. Alumni arrive at Kvarn reunion party. Hugo charms Nathalie; Philip greets Louise. At Kvarn, Sara meets Dan. Carl introduces Sara to alumni. Louise overhear Philip's parents argue about missing reunion; Philip's ineptness. Louise kisses Philip. Hugo, Nathalie have sex. Sara leaves party to join Sasha. Drunken Hugo, Philip, William play Truth or dare?. Hugo dares Willian: snort drug from Philip's penis. Louise wakes. Philip, Hugo throw snuff boxes into pond. Grace views video: Louise partying. Former Kvarn student phones Amaya.
6	"I, Accuse...!" (J'accuse...!)	Andrea Östlund	Fredrik Agetoft, Michaela Hamilton, Anna Platt	22 August 2021
Former student, Eva to Amaya: abused by Carl, numerous club members. Daniel returns to work at Jorge's café. Caroline teases Hugo about Nathalie having sex. Hugo offends Nathalie, who leaves. Sasha to Saïd: repaired stable door, went home. Dan blocks Saïd's questioning Sasha. Grace calls in Sara to hear Nathalie's ordeals including rape video. Sara advises informing police, but Nathalie's too afraid of their revenge. Sara hands scrapbook to Education Minister, which describes club's systemic sexual abuses. Minister avers to follow through. Louise, Kendra become friends. Isaac, Nasim have dinner with her parents. Later Nassim reveals pregnancy; Isaac promises support. Sara visits Daniel. Philip tutors Sebbe, Anja. Philip, Louise lunch, but his credit cards are rejected. Philip insults Louise, who leaves his car. Saïd, Jovanna hear William's confession: murdered Robin. William: poured vodka down Robin's throat. Dan releases William; not murder: no motive, not pushed into river. Otto to Philip: no longer funding drug habit. Philip insults Otto. Nasim breaks with Isaac: seen dealing drugs, again. Elisabeth to Sara: Robin's death ruled accidental. William to Grace: Hugo, Philip ordered confession. Daniel learns Sara's working at Kvarn. Carl to Sara: Elisabeth no longer effective as principal: Sara replaces Elisabeth.
7	"When the Leaves Fall Off" (När löven faller av)	David Berron	Fredrik Agetoft, Michaela Hamilton, Anna Platt	22 August 2021
Hugo apologises to Nathalie; she disbelieves his sincerity. Philip, Louise reconcile. Sara wakes, notices Sasha's keychain. Caroline accuses Nathalie: her friends releasing videos. Sara notices cameras around school. Kenneth demands money out of Carl's project. Kenneth declares Hugo should have died. Philip learns Carl's project collapsed, placing Otto in debt. Kenneth accuses Dan: bought off by Carl; will hire private investigators. Carl berates Hugo for involvement with Nathalie. Sara disbelieves women's historical abuse; Amaya breaks off friendship. Nasim asks for Sara's assistance with midwife, but Sara's too busy. Due to financial problems, Philip attacks Hugo in clubroom, snorts drugs and drives off. Louise meets Kendra, who learns Louise's involvement with Philip. Carl berates Hugo, club members for sloppy behaviour. Carl invites Sara to his home for school business. Kendra to Nasim: Louise has someone else. Sara meets Daniel at Kvarn. Caroline learns Hugo really likes Nathalie. At Kvarn, Sasha burns scrapbook, which Sara had found. Isaac argues with father over lack of support. Carl to Sara: approves of romance with Sasha. Otto to Philip: Carl ruined family's finances. Carl hands over Sara's contract for perusal. Daniel enters Sasha's home, takes his keychain. Grace reconciles with William. Caroline sees another video.
8	"Curtain" (Ridå)	David Berron	Fredrik Agetoft, Michaela Hamilton, Anna Platt	22 August 2021
Isaac attends Kvarn. Philip enters class, but sent to Sara. Daniel hands keys to Sara. Hugo accuses Isaac of murder, Isaac walks out. Hugo sent out. Isaac to Hugo: sold Carl drugs that night. Philip apologises to Louise, who counters: get help with anger issues. Outside, Sasha observes Sara meeting Amaya. Sara to Amaya: interview Kenneth, Otto. Sara to Philip: fits in Kvarn. Amaya photographs Carl's empty project site. Amaya phones Carl: fraud, blackmail accusations. Carl threatens libel suit. Carl to Sara: leaving town. Grace, Louise, Nathalie perform play. Nathalie removes her wig; describes Zebra Club's activities: points out sickest members as Hugo, Caroline, Philip. Nathalie admits being raped in video. William applauds, other join in. Hugo, Caroline, Philip leave. Sebbe posts Nathalie's video online. Louise slaps Philip. William overhears Caroline confront Nathalie: Louise, Philip had sex, William, Caroline had sex. Kendra accompanies Nasim to appointment. Philip, Hugo pack bags, leave Kvarn. Sara to Sasha: Carl left country. Amaya phones Sara: Carl filmed people's debauched activities for blackmail. Sara realises Carl used school's cameras; discovers Carl's server room with multiple cameras. Sara views her, Sasha having sex. Another video: Robin pushed downstairs by Caroline, he's unconscious. Caroline stands behind Sara.
