= Sara Sommerfeld =

Swedish actress (born 1977)

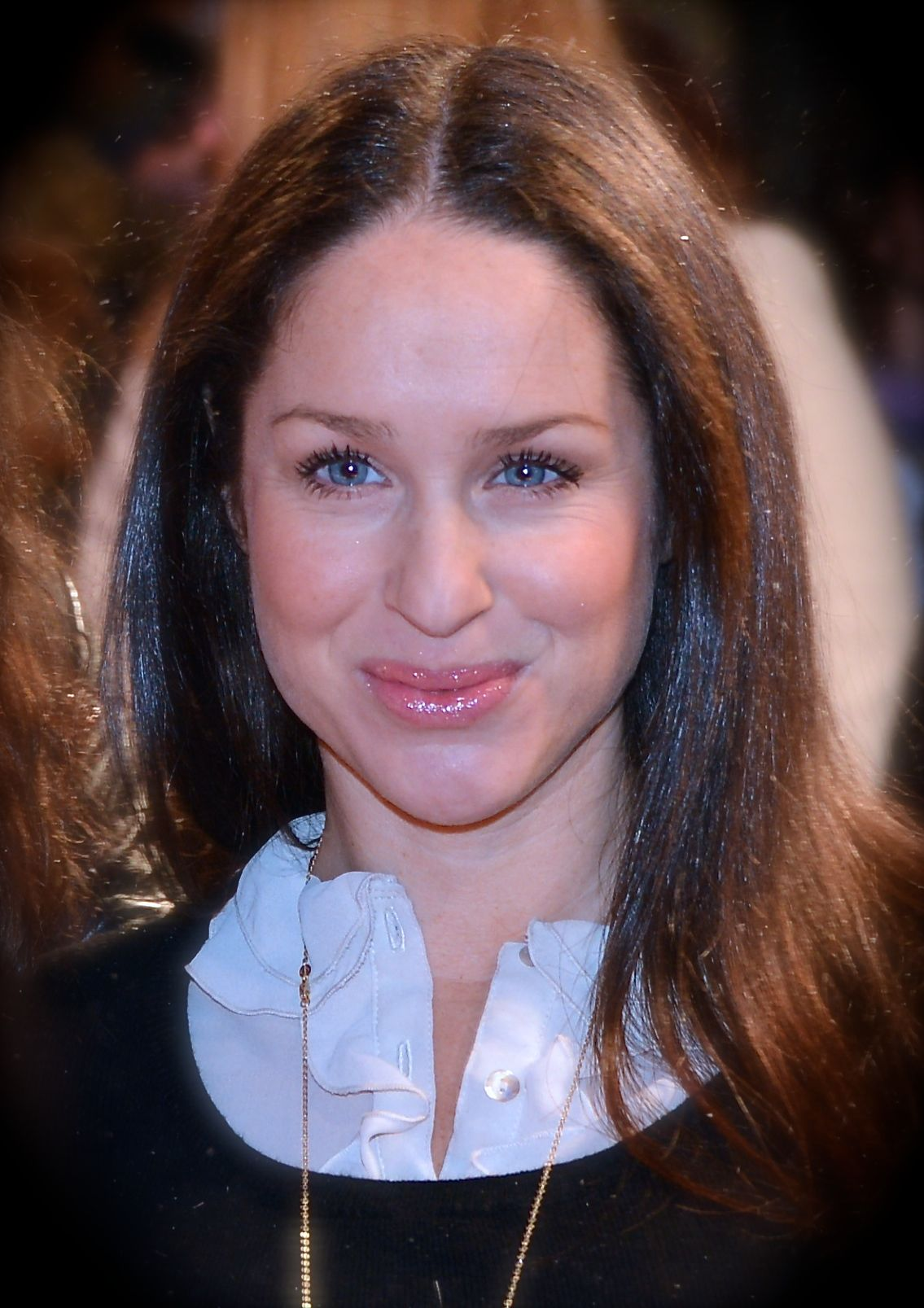
- Sommerfeld in 2012.
- Born: Sara Anita Sommerfeld; 28 October 1977 (age 49); Sollentuna, Sweden
- Occupation: Actress
- Years active: 1989–present
- Partner: Jonas Unger
- Children: 2
- Website: sarasommerfeld.com

Sara Anita Sommerfeld (born 28 October 1977) is a Swedish actress.

Sara Sommerfeld was born in Sollentuna north of Stockholm. Her parents are Polish-Jewish immigrants who came to Sweden in 1968. Sara Sommerfeld started as a child actress at age ten. After she graduated from the Swedish National Theatre Academy in Gothenburg in 2001, she has acted in several feature films, TV series, radio shows and voice overs, and performed at different theatres in Sweden.

== Filmography ==
- Maskrosbarn (1989, TV series)
- Kaninmannen (1990)
- Den goda viljan (1992)
- Sökarna (1993)
- Free Willy 2: The Adventure Home (1995) (Swedish voice)
- Vänner och Fiender (1996, TV series)
- Noll tolerans (1999) (not credited)
- Vingar av glas (2000)
- Atlantis: The Lost Empire (2001) (Swedish voice)
- Minoes (2001) (Swedish voice)
- Tsatsiki – vänner för alltid (2001)
- Hem till Midgård (2003, TV series)
- Hjärtslag (2004)
- Shark Tale (2004) (Swedish voice)
- En decemberdröm (2005, TV series)
- Babas bilar (2006)
- Beck – Advokaten (2006)
- Göta kanal 3 - Kanalkungens hemlighet (2010)
