= En hederlig jul med Knyckertz =

2021 Swedish television Advent calendar

- Country of origin: Sweden
- Original language: Swedish

Original release
- Network: SVT1; SVT Barn; SVT Play
- Release: 1 December – 24 December 2021

Related
- Mirakel (2020); Kronprinsen som försvann (2022)

En hederlig jul med Knyckertz (An honest Christmas with Knyckertz) was the 2021 Sveriges Television's Christmas Calendar (SVT). It started airing on 1 December 2021, and ended on 24 December the same year.

== Plot ==
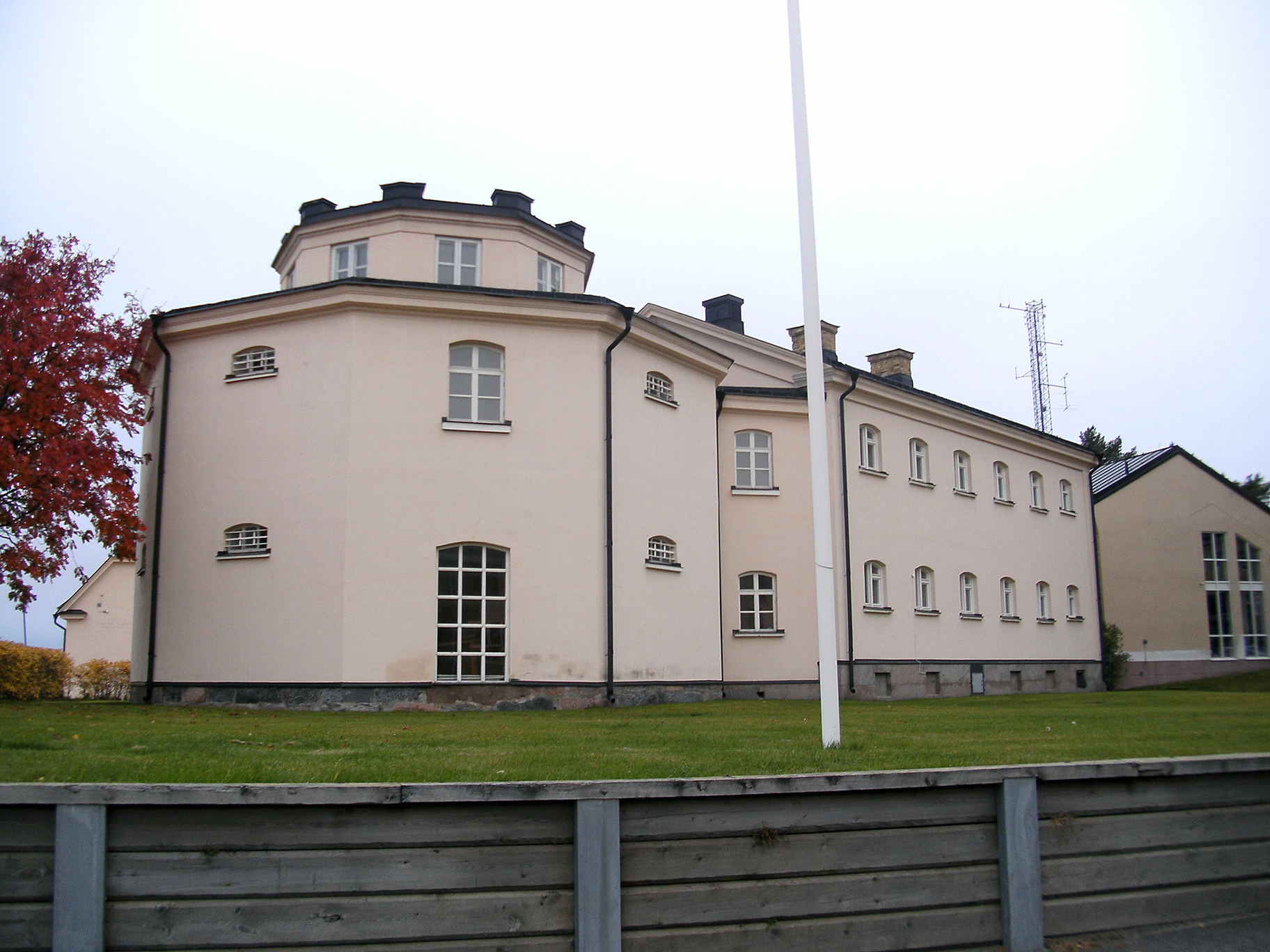
Luleå County Prison, where the prison scenes were filmed.

11-year-old Ture Knyckertz wants to celebrate an ordinary and "honest" Christmas with his family. Unfortunately his family are all petty criminals and thieves, so Ture feels like an outsider as he wants to live an honest life. When "the rose from Sinai" (a large mounted gem) gets stolen at the local church, Ture (whose biggest dream is to become a police officer) starts investigating to solve the mystery.

The series takes place on Earth in a parallel universe and is characterized by the absence of mobile telephones, television sets and computers, and the setting is hard to place in a specific time period.

== Roles ==
- Gizem Erdogan – Fia Knyckertz
- David Sundin – Bove Knyckertz
- Axel Adelöw – Ture Knyckertz
- Paloma Grandin – Ellen "Kriminellen" Knyckertz
- Claes Malmberg – Paul Isman
- Julia Dufvenius – Hildegun Wagner
- Filip Berg – Frank Flink
- Gunnel Fred – Stulia Knyckertz
- Vanna Rosenberg – Biskopen Kikki
- David Nzinga – TA Gisslander
- Ylva Lööf – Kristina
- Gina-Lee Fahlén Ronander – Lisa
- Peter Apelgren – Hobby
- Elisabeth Wernesjö – Byttan Bing Bång
- Nova Tiwana – Sara
