= Wings of Glass =

- Swedish: Vingar av glas
- Directed by: Reza Bagher
- Written by: Reza Bagher; Nathalie Drago
- Produced by: Peter Kropenin
- Starring: Sara Sommerfeld
- Cinematography: Håkan Holmberg
- Release date: 27 October 2000
- Running time: 105 minutes
- Country: Sweden
- Language: Swedish

Wings of Glass (Swedish: Vingar av glas) is a 2000 Swedish drama film directed by Reza Bagher. The lead roles are played by Alexander Skarsgård and Sara Sommerfeld. The film was entered into the 23rd Moscow International Film Festival.

== Cast ==
- Sara Sommerfeld as Nazli
- Alexander Skarsgård as Johan
- Said Oveissi as Abbas
- Aminah Al Fakir Bergman as Mahin
- Rafael Edholm as Hamid
- Mina Azarian as Pari
- Josephine Bornebusch as Lotta
