= Tea Stjärne =

Swedish actress

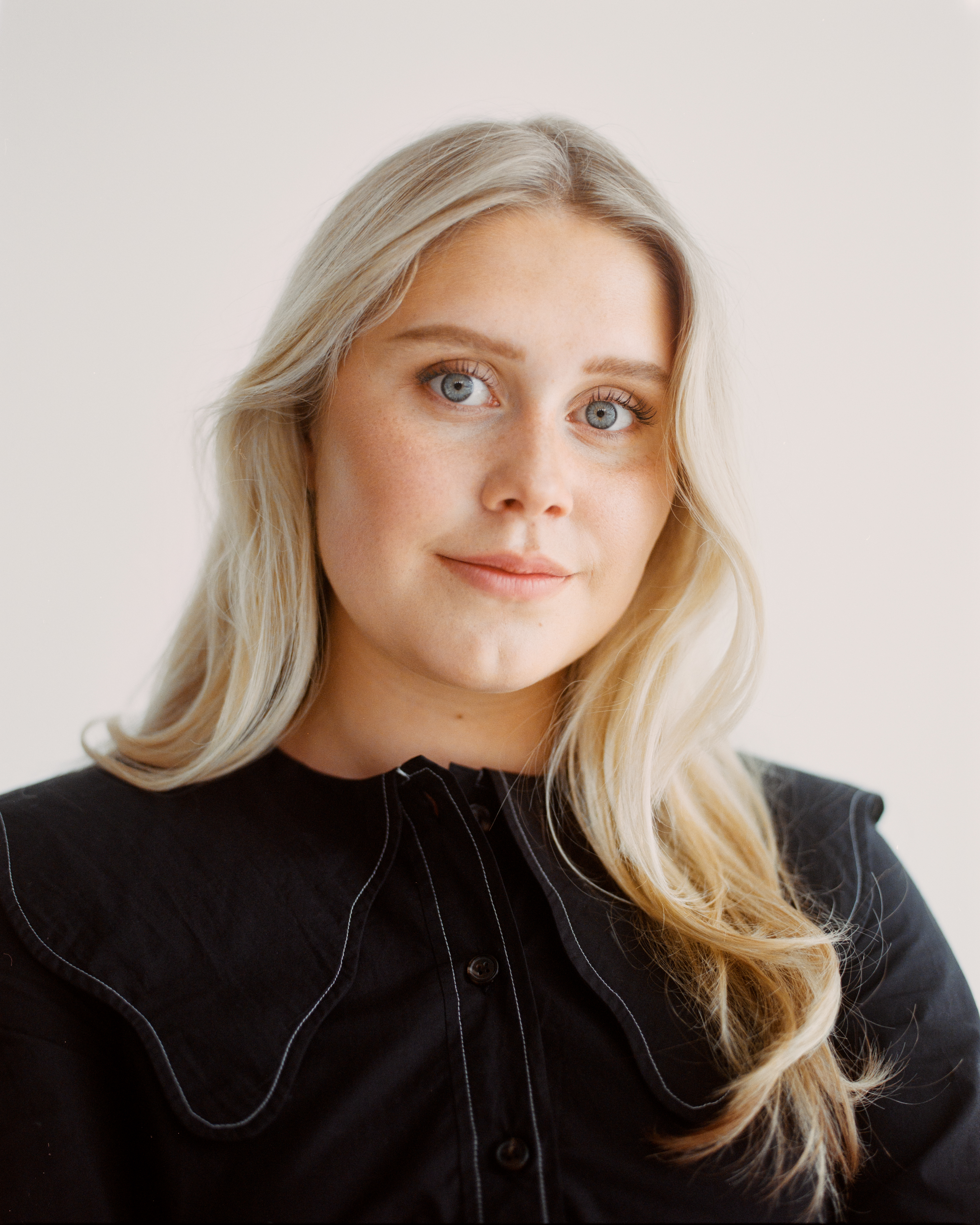
- Stjärne in 2023
- Born: Tea Aurora Inez Jacobsdotter Stjärne; 31 July 2001 (age 24); Stockholm, Sweden
- Occupation: Actor

Tea Aurora Inez Jacobsdotter Stjärne (born 31 July 2001) is a Swedish actress. In 2011, she had the leading role in the SVT series Tjuvarnas jul along with Gustaf Hammarsten. In 2023, she has a leading role as Mia Thorstensson in the Netflix series Barracuda Queens.
