= Kerstin Linden =

Swedish child actress (born 2008)

Kerstin Linden (born 24 August 2008) is a Swedish child actress. She has acted in SVT's Christmas calendar for 2022 called Kronprinsen som försvann. In 2024, she plays the lead role of Ronja in the Netflix series Ronja, the Robber's Daughter.
