= Ronja, the Robber's Daughter (2024 TV series) =

Swedish television series

- Genre: Adventure; Drama
- Based on: Ronia, the Robber's Daughter by Astrid Lindgren
- Written by: Hans Rosenfeldt
- Directed by: Lisa James Larsson
- Starring: Kerstin Linden; Jack Bergenholtz Henriksson; Christopher Wagelin; Krista Kosonen; Sverrir Gudnason; Maria Nohra; Pernilla August; Vera Vitali; Johan Ulveson; Per Lasson; Mattias Silvell; David Wiberg; Lancelot Ncube; Omid Khansari; Björn Elgerd; Nils Kärnekull; Linus Eklund Adolphson; Isa Aouifia; John Alexander Eriksson; Kim Kold; Logi Tulinius; Joakim Nätterqvist; Fredrik Alfredsson
- Music by: Johan Söderqvist
- Country of origin: Sweden
- Original language: Swedish

Production
- Executive producers: Sara Askelöf; Hanne Palmquist; Johan Palmberg
- Producers: Mattias Arehn; Bonnie Skoog Feeney
- Cinematography: Frida Wendel
- Editors: Fredrik Morheden; Elias Säll
- Running time: 45 minutes
- Production companies: Filmlance International; Film i Väst (co-producer); Degeto Film (co-producer); Ahil (co-producer)

Original release
- Network: Netflix
- Release: 28 March – 24 October 2024

Ronja, the Robber's Daughter (Swedish: Ronja Rövardotter) is a Swedish television series based on the novel of the same name by Astrid Lindgren.

The series premiered on Netflix in 2024, and consists of 12 episodes, divided into two seasons. The first season, comprising six episodes, debuted on March 28, while the second season premiered on October 24.

== Plot summary ==
Set in a medieval fantasy world, the series follows Ronja, the adventurous daughter of Mattis, the leader of a notorious bandit tribe. She grows up in a grand castle located deep within an ancient and enchanted forest, home to magical creatures and untamed wilderness. On the stormy night of her birth, a lightning bolt strikes the castle, splitting it in two. Years later, a rival bandit tribe settles in the other half of the ruined stronghold, further deepening the hostility between the two groups.

As Ronja gets older, she frequently explores the vast and mysterious forest, learning to navigate its dangers and wonders. During one of her adventures, she encounters Birk, the son of the rival tribe's leader. He is the first person her age she has ever met, and despite the bitter feud between their tribes, the two form a deep and secret friendship.

One evening, Ronja returns home to discover that her father has captured Birk and that the bandits are mistreating him. Determined to save her friend, she goes to Birk's tribe in order to have them free Birk in a prisoner exchange, but her father sees this as betrayal and disowns her. Rejected by their families, Ronja and Birk flee into the wilderness and seek refuge in a remote cave.

As winter approaches, they realize that survival in the harsh, frozen forest is impossible. Despite the dire circumstances, Ronja refuses to return home, insisting that she would rather die than face her father's rejection. Birk, unwilling to let Ronja perish, ultimately takes her back to the castle. To his surprise, Mattis relents and allows Birk to stay, realizing that his daughter's life depends on Birk's presence.

Eventually, the friendship and love between Ronja and Birk inspire the two rival tribes to unite against a greater threat, which is a group of ruthless soldiers from a nearby fortress who relentlessly hunt their tribes.

== Cast ==
- Kerstin Linden – Ronja
- Jack Bergenholtz Henriksson – Birk
- Christopher Wagelin – Mattis
- Krista Kosonen – Lovis
- Sverrir Gudnason – Borka
- Maria Nohra – Undis
- Pernilla August – Valdir
- Vera Vitali – Cappa
- Johan Ulveson – Skalle-Per
- Per Lasson – Sturkas
- Mattias Silvell – Joen
- David Wiberg – Jutis
- Lancelot Ncube – Tjegge
- Omid Khansari – Fjosok
- Björn Elgerd – Tjorm
- Nils Kärnekull – Lill-Klippen
- Linus Eklund Adolphson – Pelje
- Isa Aouifia – Turre
- John Alexander Eriksson – Knotas
- Kim Kold – Labbas
- Logi Tulinius – Ulv
- Joakim Nätterqvist – Björn
- Fredrik Alfredsson – Dockas

== Production ==
=== Casting ===
Maggie Widstrand oversaw the casting of the child actresses and actors in the series, while Tusse Lande was responsible for casting the adult actresses and actors. In the fall of 2021, the production team, along with Widstrand, conducted an extensive search across Sweden, visiting locations such as Vimmerby, Linköping, Umeå, Gävle, and Falun in search of a child actress and child actor for the two lead roles.

For the role of Ronja, the casting process involved approximately 4,000 auditions. After a rigorous selection process, 13-year-old Kerstin Linden was ultimately chosen for the lead role. Linden had previously portrayed Lill-Märta in The Emigrants and as Hilda, an impoverished girl, in The Crown Prince Who Disappeared.

=== Filming ===
The series was produced by Filmlance International for the Viaplay Group, in collaboration with the Swedish film studio Film i Väst. Filming took place across various locations in Sweden, including:

- Bohus Fortress in Kungälv
- The courtyard and underground tunnels in central Gothenburg
- Sveafallen Nature Reserve and Ugglehöjden Nature Reserve, near Degerfors
- Åre
- Forests north of Falun
- Örebro
- Forests in Lithuania

=== Distribution ===
Originally, the series was intended to be released on the Swedish streaming service Viaplay, but in November 2023, Viaplay Group postponed it indefinitely due to financial difficulties. The series was later acquired by Netflix, which released it on March 28, 2024.

The series premiered on Netflix simultaneously in the Nordic countries, the United Kingdom, France, Spain, the Netherlands, Central and Eastern Europe, as well as several other European countries. In Germany, the series aired on ARD. The series was made available on the Swedish TV channel SVT Play in December 2024.

== Episodes ==
Series	Episodes		Originally released
1	12	6	28 March 2024
1	12	6	24 October 2024

=== Season 1 (2024) ===
No. overall	No. in season	Title	Directed by	Written by	Original release date
Part 1
1	1	"An Eye To The Sky"	Lisa James Larsson	Astrid Lindgren & Hans Rosenfeldt	28 March 2024
2	2	"Robber Chief"	Lisa James Larsson	Astrid Lindgren & Hans Rosenfeldt	28 March 2024
3	3	"The Stoop"	Lisa James Larsson	Astrid Lindgren & Hans Rosenfeldt	28 March 2024
4	4	"First Snow"	Lisa James Larsson	Astrid Lindgren & Hans Rosenfeldt	28 March 2024
5	5	"My Brother"	Lisa James Larsson	Astrid Lindgren & Hans Rosenfeldt	28 March 2024
6	6	"Spring Cry"	Lisa James Larsson	Astrid Lindgren & Hans Rosenfeldt	28 March 2024
Part 2
7	1	"I Have No Child"	Pontus Klänge	Hans Rosenfeldt	24 October 2024
8	2	"The Wilderness"	Pontus Klänge	Hans Rosenfeldt	24 October 2024
9	3	"Bear Cave"	Pontus Klänge	Hans Rosenfeldt	24 October 2024
10	4	"Mattis"	Pontus Klänge	Hans Rosenfeldt	24 October 2024
11	5	"Home-Coming"	Pontus Klänge	Astrid Lindgren & Hans Rosenfeldt	24 October 2024
12	6	"A Band Of Robbers"	Pontus Klänge	Astrid Lindgren & Hans Rosenfeldt	24 October 2024

== Accolades ==
The series won at the 23rd Visual Effects Society Awards in the category of Outstanding Animated Character in an Episode, Commercial, Game Cinematic, or Real-Time Project.
