= Alva Bratt =

Swedish actress (born 1998)

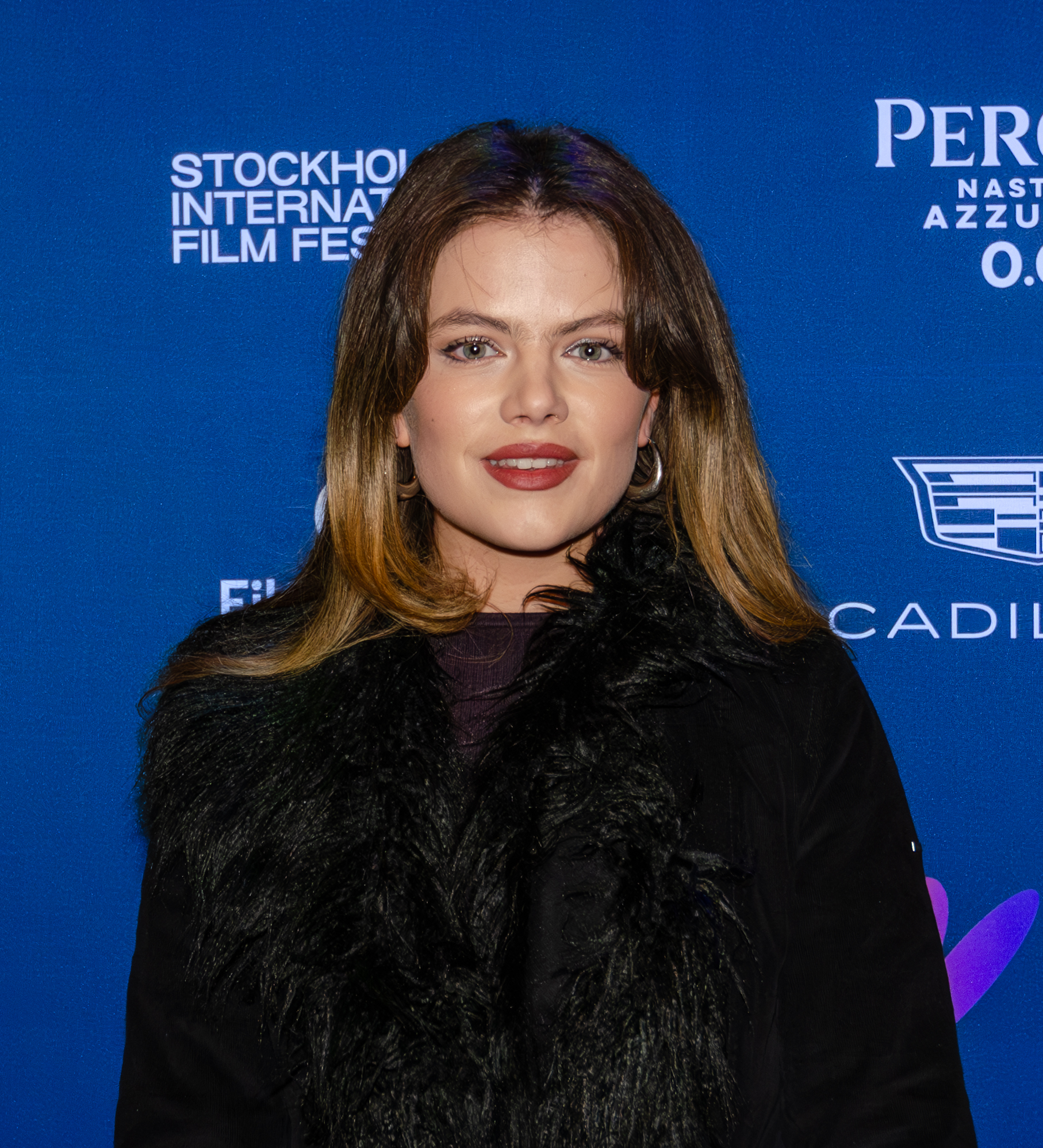
- Alva Bratt at Stockholm International Film Festival 2023
- Born: Alva Leia Bratt; 28 September 1998 (age 28); Stockholm, Sweden
- Occupation: Actress

Alva Leia Bratt (born 28 September 1998) is a Swedish actress. She is best known for her role as Felicia Kroon in the SVT series Eagles. She also appeared in the Netflix series Quicksand and the SVT series Kronprinsen som försvann. In 2023, she played Lollo Millkvist in the Netflix series Barracuda Queens.

== Career ==
After a minor part in Quicksand, she had her first major role in the teen sports drama Eagles (2019–2022). She played Felicia Kroon, an influencer who moves to her hometown in Småland after living in Boston while her father played for the Bruins.

== Filmography ==
=== Film ===
Year	Title	Role	Notes	Ref.
2024	A Part of You	Esther		
2025	The Dance Club	Rakel		
TBA	The Von Fersens	Sophie	Netflix	

=== Television ===
Year	Title	Role	Notes	Ref.
2019	Quicksand	Mela	Episode: "Maja"	
2019–2022	Eagles	Felicia Kroon	Main role	
2021	A Class Apart	Caroline	Main role	
2022	Kronprinsen som försvann	Augustina	Main role	
2023–present	Barracuda Queens	Lollo Millkvist	Main role	
2027	Sarek†		Main role	
