= Göta kanal 3: Kanalkungens hemlighet =

2009 film

- Directed by: Christjan Wegner
- Written by: Hans Iveberg
- Produced by: Anders Birkeland; Göran Lindström
- Starring: Janne Carlsson; Eva Röse; Magnus Härenstam
- Cinematography: Jens Fischer
- Edited by: Darek Hodor; Katarina Wiklund
- Release date: 25 December 2009 (Sweden)
- Running time: 92 minutes
- Country: Sweden
- Language: Swedish

Göta kanal 3: Kanalkungens hemlighet (English: Göta Canal 3: The Canal King's Secret) is a Swedish comedy film which was released to cinemas in Sweden on 25 December 2009 directed by Christjan Wegner.

It is a sequel to Göta kanal eller Vem drog ur proppen? and Göta kanal 2 – Kanalkampen.

== Cast ==
- Janne Carlsson as Janne Andersson
- Eva Röse as Petra Andersson
- Magnus Samuelsson as the motorcyclist
- Magnus Härenstam as Peter Black
- Sara Sommerfeld as Tanja Svensson
- Svante Grundberg as the canoeist
- Christian Rinmad as Vincent
- Rafael Edholm as Benito
- Eric Ericson as Henrik
- Jon Skolmen as a Norwegian
