= Rafael Edholm =

Swedish actor

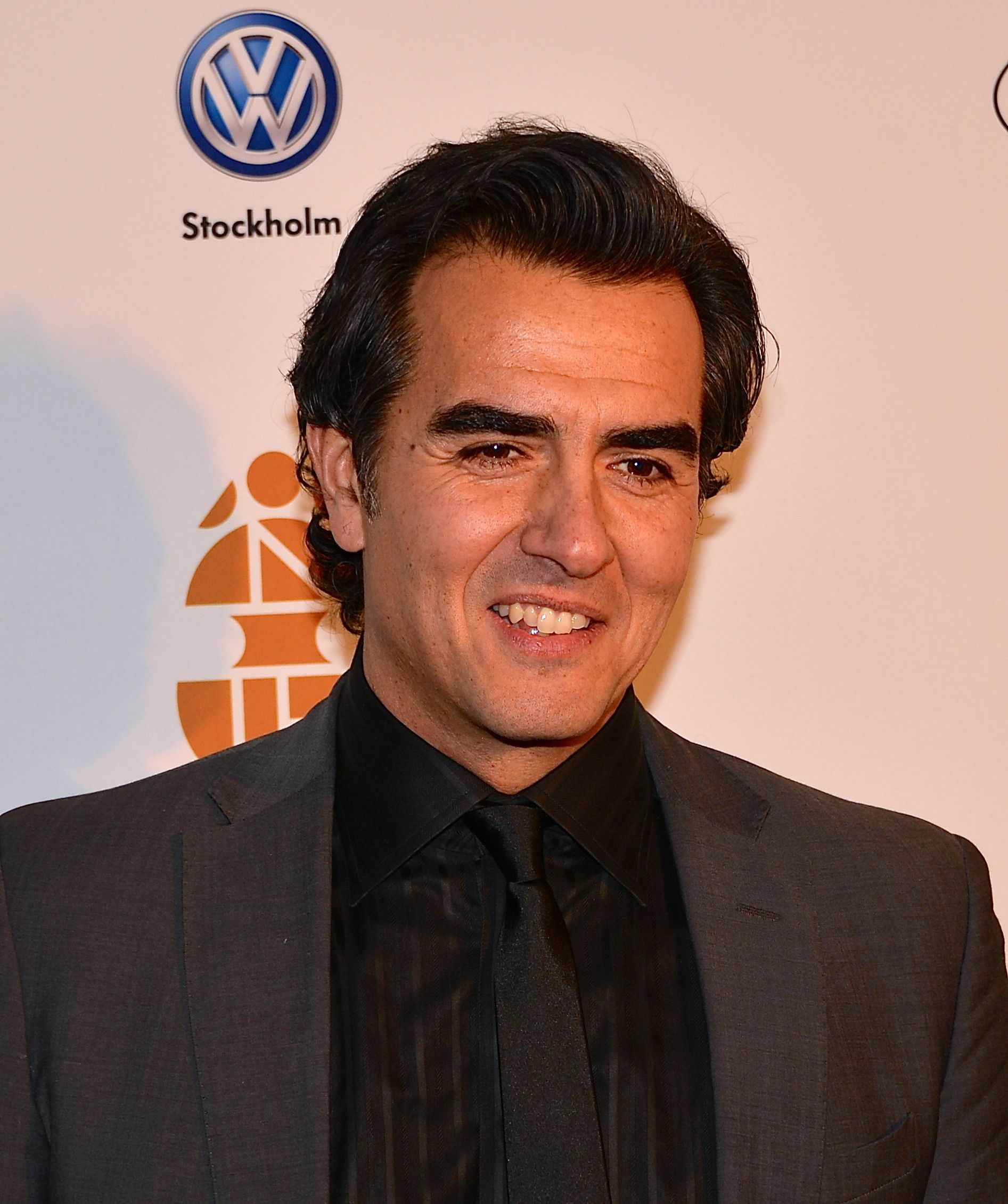
- Born: John Rafael Edholm; 8 May 1966 (age 60); Stockholm, Sweden
- Occupations: Actor, film director
- Years active: 1985–present
- Spouses: Görel Crona (m. 1997–2006) Daga Lamy (m. 2007–2011) Freja Kjellberg Borchies (m. 2015)
- Children: 1

John Rafael Edholm (born 8 May 1966) is a Swedish actor, film director, screenwriter and model. In the SVT series The spiral which was broadcast in 2012, Edholm played the police Gunnarson, where one of his opponents was Tuva Novotny.

He also appeared in George Michael's Freedom! '90 music video in October 1990.

Edholm was married to Görel Crona 1997–2006 (with one son) and after that married Daga Lamy until the spring of 2011. He also dated American actress Jennifer Coolidge while studying in New York.

== Filmography ==
- 1999 – The One and Only
- 1999 – Anna Holt – polis (TV)
- 2000 – Järngänget
- 2000 – Vingar av glas
- 2000 – Reuter & Skoog (TV)
- 2001 – Livvakterna
- 2002 – Beck – Kartellen (TV film)
- 2003 – Hem till Midgård (TV)
- 2005 – Komplett galen (also director)
- 2006 – Göta kanal 2 – Kanalkampen
- 2006 – Babas bilar (also director and screenwriter)
- 2009 – Göta kanal 3: Kanalkungens hemlighet
- 2010 – Wallander – Indrivaren
- 2015 – An American Girl: Grace Stirs Up Success
- 2026 – A-Men to That (also director and writer)
