= The Dance Club =

- Theatrical release poster
- Directed by: Lisa Langseth
- Written by: Lisa Langseth
- Produced by: Maria Dahlin; Veronika Öhnedal
- Starring: Nils Wetterholm; Alva Bratt
- Cinematography: Jonas Alarik
- Edited by: Thomas Grotmol
- Music by: Adam Nordén
- Production companies: Meta Film Stockholm; Film Stockholm; Filmpool Nord; SVT and Storm Films
- Distributed by: SF Studios
- Release dates: August 9, 2025 (Way Out West); September 19, 2025 (Sweden)
- Running time: 100 minutes
- Countries: Sweden; Norway
- Language: Swedish

The Dance Club is a 2025 romantic comedy film written and directed by Lisa Langseth. A co-production between Sweden and Norway, the film stars Nils Wetterholm and Alva Bratt accompanied by Evelyn Mok, Matias Varela and Julia Franzén.

== Synopsis ==
Johannes, an eccentric psychology student, and Rakel, a performance artist, form an unconventional club with their patients to help them fight the causes of their pain. As the club grows, Johannes struggles to maintain unity while unwittingly falling madly in love with Rakel.

== Cast ==
- Nils Wetterholm as Johannes
- Alva Bratt as Rakel
- Evelyn Mok
- Matias Varela
- Julia Franzén
- Linda Anborg
- Marina Kereklidou as The curator
- Mikael Jaldeby as Shop assistant
- Matilda Ekström as Psychologist at a meeting

== Production ==
Principal photography for the film took place between September and October 2024 in Stockholm and Luleå.

== Release ==
The Dance Club had its world premiere on August 9, 2025, at the Way Out West. It was originally scheduled for commercial release in Swedish theaters on October 3, 2025, but was moved up to September 19, 2025.
