= Evelyn Mok =

Swedish stand-up comedian (born 1987)

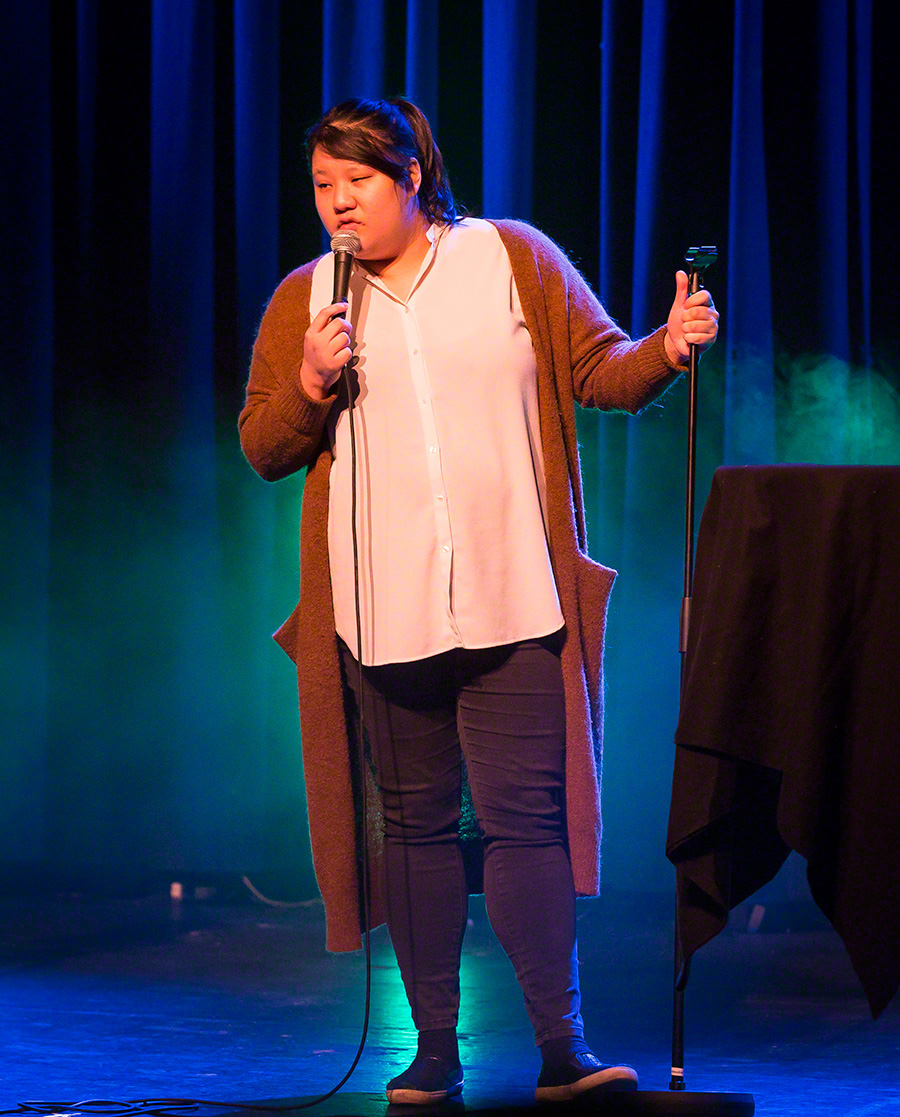
- Evelyn Mok performing at the Crap Comedy Festival in Oslo 2016
- Born: 29 November 1987 (age 38); Mariestad, Västergötland, Sweden
- Education: Stockholm University; Roehampton University
- Occupations: stand-up comedian, actress
- Years active: 2008–present
- Parent: Francis Mok (father)
- Website: evelynmok.com

Evelyn Mok (Chinese: 莫悅玲; Jyutping: mok^{6} jyut^{6} ling^{4}, born 29 November 1987) is a Swedish stand-up comedian and actress.

== Early life ==
Mok was born in Sweden to a Chinese immigrant family. Her father, Francis Mok, came from British Hong Kong and is currently a retired chef, and her mother is Chinese and grew up in India. Mok jokes that she identified as Indian until she was ten.

== Career ==
Mok began performing stand-up in Sweden and later went to England's University of Roehampton as part of the Erasmus Programme. She was a finalist at the Chortle Awards in 2013 and described Andy Kaufman, Demetri Martin and Tony Law as her favourite comics. Comedy Central (Sweden) referred to her as "the Swedish Amy Schumer". Mok performed at every Edinburgh Fringe from 2013-2018.

Mok has appeared on Mock the Week, Hypothetical, Heresy, Off Menu with Ed Gamble and James Acaster and Sam Delaney's News Thing, and has also appeared on Swedish TV.

As an actress, Mok has appeared in Wheel of Time, Spider-Man: Far From Home, I Hate Suzie and The Reluctant Landlord.

From April 2019 to October 2021, she hosted Rice to Meet You, a comedy podcast, with Malaysian comedian Nigel Ng.

In 2025, she has a supporting role in the romantic comedy feature The Dance Club.

== Personal life ==
In 2021, in Hisingen, Gothenburg, Mok was subject to a racist attack.
