= Julia Franzén =

Swedish influencer, personal trainer and life coach (born 1990)

- Born: Julia Stefanie Liv Johansson; 30 June 1990; Lerum parish
- Website: www.juliafranzen.com

Julia Franzén (born 30 June 1990) is a Swedish TV-host, personal trainer and life coach.

== Career ==
Franzén was born in Lerum, Sweden. When she was younger, Franzén explored many professions. Among others, she worked as a waitress at Sjömagasinet where Leif Mannerström is a chef. She also worked at Stena Line and Gothia towers and organised different events. She has been a waitress for the Swedish royal family twice.

Franzén lost 25 kilos and entered a bikini fitness competition in Globen, Sweden. Franzén started her own company where she worked as a personal trainer and coach online. She moved to the United States to study to become a TV host.

In 2015, Franzén and her cousin Camilla participated in the show Cirkus Magaluf in which she had a leading role; the show aired on TV3 in 2016.

In 2017, Franzén was a finalist in Miss Universe Sweden.

Franzén participated in Robinson 2020, which was broadcast on TV4, where she made it to Day 40 (the final week) before being eliminated.

In 2021, Franzen was scheduled to be the bachelorette in the Swedish version of The Bachelorette. The series will be broadcast on Sjuan.

In 2025, she has a supporting role in the romantic comedy feature The Dance Club.
