= Marcus Schenkenberg =

Swedish model (born 1968)

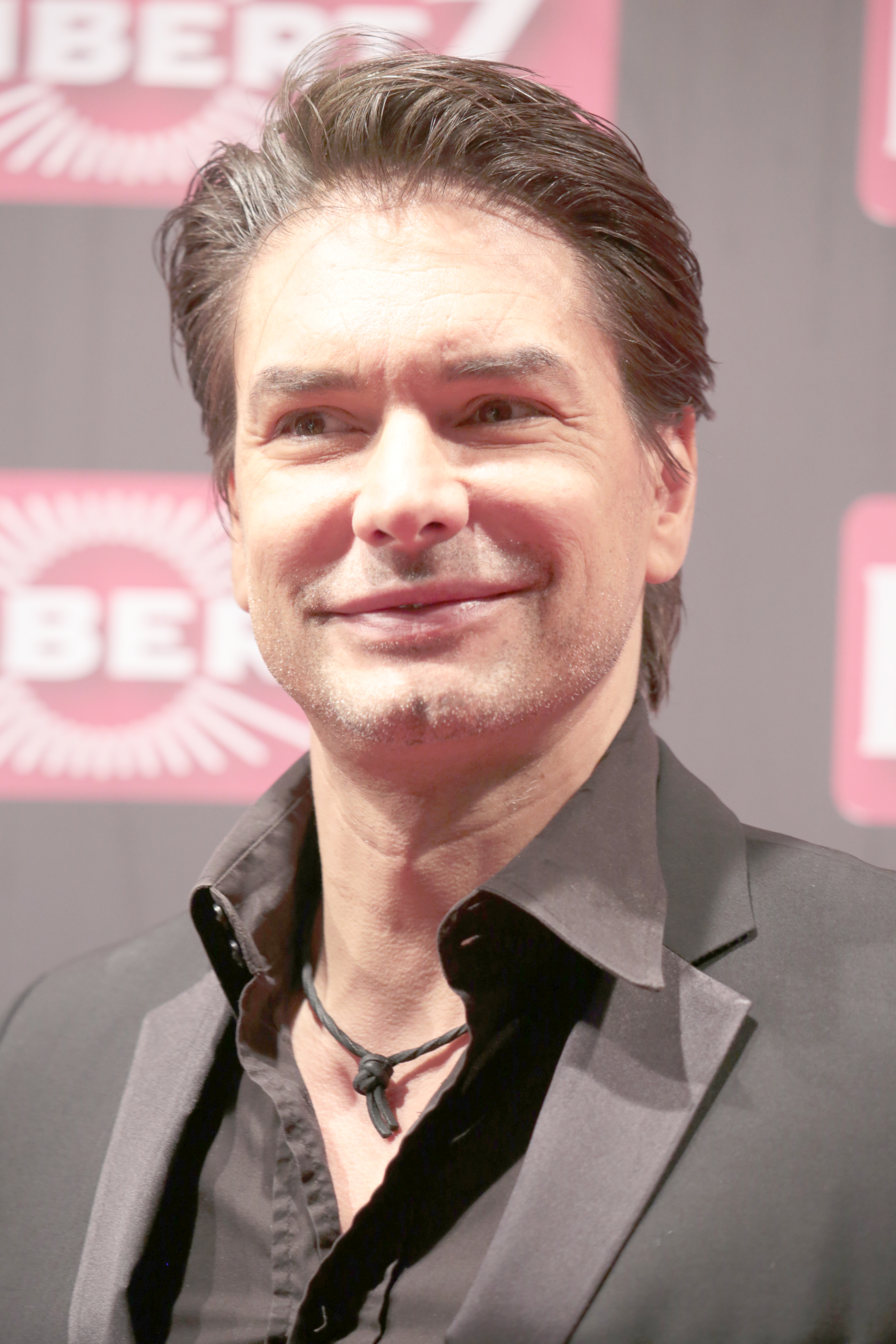
- Schenkenberg in 2018
- Born: Marcus Lodewijk Schenkenberg van Mierop; 4 August 1968 (age 58); Stockholm, Sweden
- Modeling information
- Height: 6 ft 4 in (1.93 m)
- Hair color: Brown
- Eye color: Light brown
- Website: marcusschenkenberg.org

Marcus Lodewijk Schenkenberg van Mierop (born 4 August 1968) is a Swedish actor and model.

== Modelling ==
Schenkenberg is best known for his Calvin Klein advertisements. He has also modelled for Versace, Giorgio Armani, Donna Karan and Iceberg. In the past he has been signed to Storm Model Management in London, Wilhelmina Models, Success Models in Paris, Boss Models, and D' Management Group in Milan. His present, main agency is Kuhlmann Consulting Group in Germany, holding all licences, minor Ford Models and Soul Artist Management in New York.

== Television ==
Marcus Schenkenberg has also appeared—mostly as himself—in many episodes of different international TV shows including the Pamela Anderson vehicle V.I.P. (2001), American soap opera As the World Turns, Stacked (2005), on VH1's fourth season of The Surreal Life or One Life to Live. In Italy these were The Corlucci Cald Show, La Grande Notte del Lunedì Sera, and Never Mind the Buzzcocks (2002) as well as La Talpa (2004), the Italian version of Celebrity Mole. Further he was guest host of an Italian soccer TV program and appeared on VH1's fourth season of The Surreal Life. Schenkenberg has guested in several German TV shows such as the Bambi (2003), Heidi Klum's Germany's Next Topmodel (2006 and 2023) and took part at Stefan Raab's Wok racing (2010).

=== Filmography ===
| Year | Film | Role |
|---|---|---|
| 1988 | Meatballs and Macaroni | The big brother |
| 1997 | Prince Valiant | Tiny |
| 1999 | Hostage | Adam |
| 2000 | As the World Turns | Male Customer |
| 2010 | Multiple Sarcasms | Sachi |
| 2012 | Smash | Colin |
| 2019 | The Masked Singer | Squirrel |
| 2026 | A-Men to That | Mackan |

== Other work ==
In 1997, he published a book, Marcus Schenkenberg: New Rules, which featured numerous photos and personal notes and comments on his modeling career, as well as contributions from colleagues, family members and people in the fashion and modeling business.

In 1999, he was asked by a friend to record a song, which was meant for fun but was followed by a contract with EMI. "La Chica Marita" was produced by Tony Catania and was also released on the soundtrack of the movie Flawless with Robert De Niro. Schenkenberg described the work on the song and video as good experience, but he remained more interested in acting.

== Personal life ==
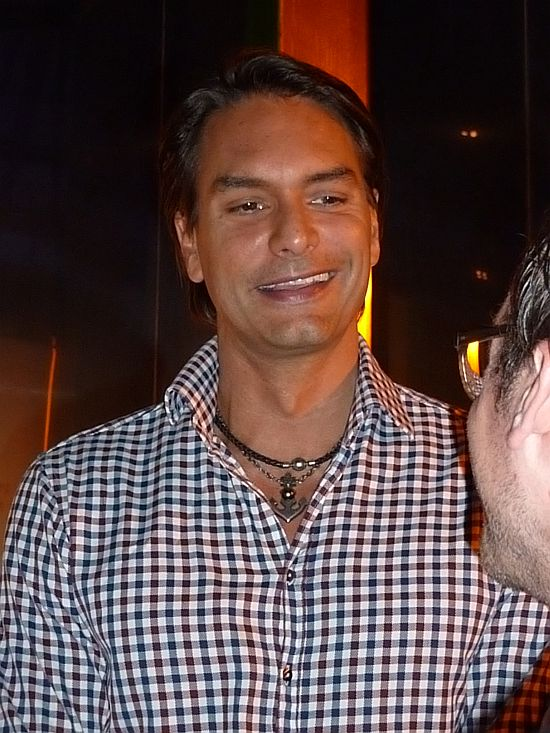
Schenkenberg in 2013

Schenkenberg lives in New York and Los Angeles and also has an apartment in Stockholm. He is fluent in five languages: Swedish, English, Dutch, French and Italian and understands German.

During the early nineties he had relationships with the models Maureen Gallegher, Catherine Hardenborg and Rosemarie Wetzel. Schenkenberg dated various prominent women during the following years, including Mariah Carey, Nicky Hilton, Niki Köhler, Victoria Silvstedt and Jessica Simpson. His relationship with Pamela Anderson between 2000 and 2001 made him more well-known to the public aside from his modelling.

== Works ==
- Schenkenberg, Marcus (1997). Marcus Schenkenberg: New Rules. New York: Universe Publishing. ISBN 0-7893-0097-4.
- Schenkenberg, Marcus (2010). Body Secrets – Sexy Shape in Just 2 Weeks (DVD). München: Riva.
