= Eagles (TV series) =

Swedish teen drama television series

- Genre: Teen drama; Sports drama
- Created by: Stefan H. Lindén
- Directed by: Carl-Petter Montell; Amanda Adolfsson; Simon Ekbäck Nordström; Stefan H. Lindén
- Starring: Alva Bratt; Edvard Olsson; Adrian Öjvindsson; Yandeh Sallah
- Country of origin: Sweden
- Original language: Swedish
- No. of series: 4
- No. of episodes: 38

Production
- Executive producers: Måns Strömberg; Sanne Övermark; Poa Strömberg; Petter Bragée
- Producers: Måns Strömberg; Alexandra Thönnersten; Stefan H. Lindén
- Production company: New Stories

Original release
- Network: SVT
- Release: 9 March 2019 – 25 February 2022

Eagles is a Swedish teen sports drama television series created by Stefan H. Lindén. Developed by New Stories, the first season premiered on Sveriges Television's streaming service SVT Play on 9 March 2019. The fourth and final season aired from 28 January to 25 February 2022.

== Cast ==
- Alva Bratt as Felicia Kroon
- Edvard Olsson as Elias Kroon
- Adrian Öjvindsson as Ludvig Johansson
- Yandeh Sallah as Amie Samuelsson Condé
- Sarah Gustafsson as Klara Ceder
  - Miryam Eriksson as Young Klara
- Per Lasson as Mats Kroon
  - Anton Forsdik as Young Mats
- Charlotta Jonsson as Leila Kroon
- Anna Sise as Petra Samuelsson
  - Adja Sise as Young Petra
- David Lindgren as Adam Molin
- Jakob Gartner as Omar Khalil
- Robert Pukitis as Ola Ceder
- Filip Wolfe Sjunnesson as Jack Barret
- Maria Alm Norell as Irene Johansson
- Oskar Laring as Andreas Johansson
- Måns Nilsson as Peter Johansson
- Maria Alm Norell as Irene Johansson

== Episodes ==
=== Series overview ===
Series	Episodes	Originally released	
Series	Episodes	First released	Last released
1	8	9 March 2019	14 April 2019
2	10	6 March 2020	10 April 2020
3	10	4 June 2021	2 July 2021
4	10	28 January 2022	25 February 2022

=== Season 1 (2019) ===
No. overall	No. in season	Title	Directed by	Written by	Original release date
1	1	"Homecoming"	Amanda Adolfsson	Stefan H. Lindén, Fanny Ekstrand, Michaela Hamilton, Anton Nyberg	9 March 2019
2	2	"First Kiss"	Amanda Adolfsson	Amanda Adolfsson, Fanny Ekstrand, Michaela Hamilton, Anton Nyberg	9 March 2019
3	3	"Sunday"	Amanda Adolfsson	Fanny Ekstrand, Michaela Hamilton, Anton Nyberg	9 March 2019
4	4	"Sleepover"	Amanda Adolfsson	Fanny Ekstrand, Michaela Hamilton, Anton Nyberg	17 March 2019
5	5	"Audition"	Amanda Adolfsson	Amanda Adolfsson, Fanny Ekstrand, Michaela Hamilton, Anton Nyberg	17 March 2019
6	6	"Halloween"	Amanda Adolfsson	Fanny Ekstrand, Michaela Hamilton, Anton Nyberg	31 March 2019
7	7	"Roadtrip"	Amanda Adolfsson	Fanny Ekstrand, Michaela Hamilton, Anton Nyberg	7 April 2019
8	8	"Lucia"	Amanda Adolfsson	Fanny Ekstrand, Michaela Hamilton, Anton Nyberg	14 April 2019

=== Season 2 (2020) ===
No. overall	No. in season	Title	Directed by	Written by	Original release date
9	1	"Arrivals"	Carl-Petter Montell	Fanny Ekstrand, Michaela Hamilton, Anton Nyberg	6 March 2020
10	2	"Reunion"	Carl-Petter Montell	Fanny Ekstrand, Anton Nyberg	6 March 2020
11	3	"Night Out"	Carl-Petter Montell	Michaela Hamilton, Anton Nyberg	6 March 2020
12	4	"Comeback"	Carl-Petter Montell	Fanny Ekstrand, Anton Nyberg	13 March 2020
13	5	"Gameday"	Carl-Petter Montell	Michaela Hamilton, Anton Nyberg	13 March 2020
14	6	"Aftermath"	Carl-Petter Montell	Fanny Ekstrand, Michaela Hamilton	20 March 2020
15	7	"Secrets"	Carl-Petter Montell	Fanny Ekstrand, Anton Nyberg	20 March 2020
16	8	"Reveals"	Carl-Petter Montell	Fanny Ekstrand, Michaela Hamilton	27 March 2020
17	9	"June"	Carl-Petter Montell	Fanny Ekstrand, Michaela Hamilton	3 April 2020
18	10	"Departures"	Carl-Petter Montell	Fanny Ekstrand, Michaela Hamilton, Anton Nyberg	10 April 2020

=== Season 3 (2021) ===
No. overall	No. in season	Title	Directed by	Written by	Original release date
19	1	"The Funeral"	Carl-Petter Montell	Michaela Hamilton, Carl-Petter Montell	4 June 2021
20	2	"Diamonds"	Carl-Petter Montell	Fanny Ekstrand, Michaela Hamilton, Carl-Petter Montell	4 June 2021
21	3	"Field Trip"	Carl-Petter Montell	Michaela Hamilton, Carl-Petter Montell, Anton Nyberg	4 June 2021
22	4	"Date Night"	Carl-Petter Montell	Carl-Petter Montell	11 June 2021
23	5	"Wounds"	Carl-Petter Montell	Simon Ekbäck Nordström, Michaela Hamilton, Carl-Petter Montell, Anton Nyberg	11 June 2021
24	6	"Crossroads"	Carl-Petter Montell	Michaela Hamilton, Carl-Petter Montell	18 June 2021
25	7	"The Bomb"	Carl-Petter Montell	Michaela Hamilton, Carl-Petter Montell	18 June 2021
26	8	"Lost"	Carl-Petter Montell	Michaela Hamilton, Carl-Petter Montell	25 June 2021
27	9	"Rewind"	Carl-Petter Montell	Michaela Hamilton, Carl-Petter Montell	25 June 2021
28	10	"New Years"	Carl-Petter Montell	Michaela Hamilton, Carl-Petter Montell	2 July 2021

=== Season 4 (2022) ===
No. overall	No. in season	Title	Directed by	Written by	Original release date
29	1	"Time"	Carl-Petter Montell	Michaela Hamilton, Francesca Maraki, Carl-Petter Montell	28 January 2022
30	2	"Valentines"	Unknown	Unknown	28 January 2022
31	3	"Nocturnal"	Unknown	Unknown	28 January 2022

== Production ==
The series was created by Stefan H. Lindén for New Stories. Principal photography for the first season took place on location in Oskarshamn in 2018. Other filming locations included Karlskrona, Kalmar, Växjö, and Stockholm. The second season was filmed in autumn 2019. Eagles has been compared to the Norwegian teen drama series Skam, an assessment that Lindén strongly disagrees with.

== Reception ==
=== Awards and nominations ===
Year	Award	Category	Nominee	Result	Ref.
2020	Venice TV Awards	Best Series	Eagles	Nominated	
2020	Kristallen	Best Television Drama	Eagles	Nominated	
