= A-Men to That =

2026 Swedish-American mockumentary film

- Directed by: Rafael Edholm
- Written by: Rafael Edholm
- Produced by: Daniella Elmqvist Prah; Kit Lubold
- Starring: Marcus Schenkenberg; Knut Berggren; Rafael Edholm; Anna Sahlene
- Cinematography: Charlotta Tengroth; Anders Holmberg; Roy Rossovich; Yoshi Schalin
- Edited by: Gregers Dohn
- Music by: Jörgen Elofsson
- Production companies: Running Mad AB; Mountaintop Holdings LLC
- Distributed by: Bläckfisk (Sweden)
- Release date: 28 January 2026 (Sweden)
- Running time: 85 minutes
- Countries: Sweden; United States
- Languages: English; Swedish

A-Men to That is a 2026 mockumentary comedy film directed and written by Rafael Edholm. The film stars Edholm alongside Marcus Schenkenberg and Knut Berggren, with all three playing fictionalized versions of themselves as former male models attempting to launch a music career as a "man band". The film had its world premiere at the Göteborg Film Festival in January 2026 and was released theatrically in Sweden on January 28, 2026. The film's score and songs were written by Jörgen Elofsson.

== Plot ==
Three former male models, past their commercial prime and facing a collective midlife crisis, decide to form a "man band" aimed at adult women. Their attempt to launch a music career takes them through modeling jobs, singing and dance lessons, and a shopping mall performance. The film draws on biographical details from its cast, including Schenkenberg's past relationship with Pamela Anderson, which forms part of his character's backstory.

== Cast ==
The principal cast play fictionalized versions of themselves:

- Rafael Edholm as Raf
- Marcus Schenkenberg as Mackan
- Knut Berggren as Knut
- Anna Sahlene as Sahline (credited as Anna Sahlin)

Several public figures from the Swedish and international music industry appear as themselves, including Mikkey Dee, Andreas Kleerup, Peter Swartling, Djo Moupondo, and Martha Edelheit.

== Production ==
The concept originated from director Rafael Edholm's observations about the absence of a male-oriented "man band" in popular culture. Edholm has described the project as personally significant following a 2015 stroke that temporarily left him unable to speak; during his recovery he returned to music, which he had previously avoided in his career.

A-Men to That is a co-production between Sweden and the United States. The Swedish production company Running Mad AB produced the film, with the American company Mountaintop Holdings LLC serving as co-producer.

== Release ==
The film was released in Swedish cinemas on January 28, 2026, distributed by Bläckfisk. It screened in approximately 50 Swedish cinemas, including Filmstaden venues.

A-Men to That had its world premiere at the Göteborg Film Festival in January 2026, where it was selected for the festival's Nordic Light section and given a Red Carpet screening at Stora Teatern in Gothenburg.

In February 2026, the film screened in Berlin during the Berlinale festival period at the Babylon cinema in the Mitte district. According to the Berliner Morgenpost, audience interest led the venue to schedule two additional screenings on February 28 and March 1, 2026.

== Reception ==
Reviewing the film for MovieZine, the publication described it as among the funnier Swedish comedies of recent years and singled out Knut Berggren's performance. Aftonbladet also covered the film around its Swedish release. On the SVT cultural programme Cyklopernas Land, critic Samanda Ekman gave the film a rating of 5 out of 5.

== Music ==
The score and principal songs were written by Jörgen Elofsson, a Swedish songwriter associated with Cheiron Studios in Stockholm. Elofsson's previous credits include Britney Spears' "Sometimes" and "(You Drive Me) Crazy", and Kelly Clarkson's "Stronger (What Doesn't Kill You)", which was nominated for Song of the Year and Record of the Year at the 2013 Grammy Awards.

Additional songs were written by:

- Eric Rosse, an American composer and producer known for Tori Amos' Little Earthquakes and Under the Pink and Sara Bareilles' Little Voice.
- Jonas Saeed, a Swedish producer and songwriter who co-wrote "Follow the Leader" by Wisin & Yandel featuring Jennifer Lopez.
- Mozella, an American songwriter who co-wrote Miley Cyrus' "Wrecking Ball" and One Direction's "Perfect".
- Kristofer Östergren, a Swedish singer-songwriter and former frontman of Melody Club.

Within the film, the three lead characters form a band called A-Men, and the songs are performed by the cast in their roles as the group.
