= Bäst i test =

Swedish comedy panel game show

- Genre: Panel show
- Created by: Alex Horne
- Based on: Taskmaster
- Presented by: Babben Larsson
- Starring: David Sundin (assistant)
- Theme music composer: The Horne Section
- Country of origin: Sweden
- Original language: Swedish
- No. of seasons: 11 (as of 2025)
- No. of episodes: 87

Production
- Producer: Svante Kettner
- Production locations: Filmhuset, Villa Frescati
- Cinematography: Fredrik Askebris; Fredrik Nilsson
- Running time: 60 minutes
- Production company: Baluba AB

Original release
- Network: SVT (2017–2023); TV4 (2024–)
- Release: March 10, 2017 – present

Bäst i test (lit. 'Best in Test') is a Swedish comedy panel show based on the British show Taskmaster. It has been broadcast on SVT since spring 2017 to 2023 and on TV4 from 2024.

The show features four fixed panelists per series, along with one guest per episode, who all compete in odd competitions, judged by Babben Larsson and assisted by David Sundin. The show is based in the Filmhuset studio where the interview with the panelists takes place, together with the show's final. Most of the competitions are done in and around Villa Frescati in Stockholm.

== Seasons ==
The first season had four episodes. Regular panellists were Bianca Kronlöf, Kodjo Akolor, Claes Malmberg and Pia Johansson. Guests were Marko Lehtosalo, Kalle Zackari Wahlström, Parisa Amiri and Eva Röse.

The second season with eight episodes was shown during the spring of 2018. The permanent contestants were Ola Forssmed, Marika Carlsson, Erik Ekstrand and Ellen Bergström. Guests were Ann Westin, Al Pitcher, Nisse Hallberg, Claes Malmberg, Emma Knyckare, Moa Lundqvist, Clara Henry and Thomas Petersson.

The third season with seven episodes aired in 2019 with the permanent contestants Anders Jansson, Annika Andersson, Nassim Al Fakir, and Clara Henry. The guest contestants were Keyyo, Marika Carlsson, Måns Nathanaelson, Per Andersson, Fab Freddie, Emma Molin and Oscar Zia.

The fourth season began in March 2020 and contained nine episodes with permanent panelists Anders Johansson, Carin da Silva, Keyyo, and Kristoffer Appelquist as well as guests Johan Glans, Josefin Johansson, Peter Apelgren, Nassim Al Fakir, Farah Abadi, Kayo Shekoni, Lina Hedlund, Özz Nûjen och Henrik Dorsin.

The fifth season began in March 2021 with the panelists Olof Wretling, Arantxa Alvarez, Morgan Alling and Johanna Nordström. Like every season, they have guest panelists. Guests for this season were Jesper Rönndahl, Christine Meltzer, Anis Don Demina, Keyyo, Fredrik Lindström, Niklas Andersson, Pernilla Wahlgren, David Batra and Nour El-Refai. This season changed filming location.

The sixth season aired in 2022 with nine episodes. The permanent panelists were Anis Don Demina, Sofia Dalén, Sussie Eriksson and Marcus Berggren, while Erik Johansson, Danny Saucedo, Annika Lantz, Lotta Engberg, Fredde Granberg, Vanna Rosenberg, Tareq Taylor, Johanna Nordström and Petrina Solange appeared as guest contestants.

The seventh season aired in 2023 with nine episodes. The permanent panelists of the season were Markoolio, Nikki Amini, Henrik Nyblom and Linnéa Wikblad. The guests were Måns Möller, Janne Andersson, Carina Berg, Edvin Törnblom, Amie Bramme Sey, Marcus Berggren, Evelyn Mok, Johar Bendjelloul and Anne Lundberg. A bonus episode was broadcast a week after episode 9, with the tasks that did not make it into the regular season.

The eighth season aired in early 2024. The permanent panelists were Johan Petersson, Maria Lundqvist, Behrouz Badreh [sv], Mauri Hermundsson and Charlotta Björck [sv]. Former season 4 contestant Anders Johansson (aka Ankan) made recurring appearances as a guest team member on team tasks.

== Episodes ==
=== Season 1 (2017) ===
The permanent panelists of the season were Bianca Kronlöf (season winner), Kodjo Akolor, Claes Malmberg and Pia Johansson.

Season 1 episodes were released on the official Taskmaster YouTube channel on 13 June 2022.

No.	Guest contestant	Winner	Original release date	Swedish viewers
1	Kalle Zackari Wahlström	Bianca Kronlöf	10 March 2017	N/A (Note: Bäst i test did not appear on the weekly list of the ten highest viewed TV programs for the 6–12 March 2017 period. The lowest-ranking program on the list, Bonus Family, was viewed by 1,098,000 people.)
2	Eva Röse	Pia Johansson	17 March 2017	N/A (Note: Bäst i test did not appear on the weekly list of the ten highest viewed TV programs for the 13–19 March 2017 period. The lowest-ranking program on the list, Sveriges mästerkock, was viewed by 1,112,000 people.)
3	Parisa Amiri	Bianca Kronlöf	24 March 2017	N/A (Note: Bäst i test did not appear on the weekly list of the ten highest viewed TV programs for the 20–26 March 2017 period. The lowest-ranking program on the list, Bonus Family, was viewed by 952,000 people.)
4	Marko "Markoolio" Lehtosalo	Marko "Markoolio" Lehtosalo	31 March 2017	N/A (Note: Bäst i test did not appear on the weekly list of the ten highest viewed TV programs for the 27 March–2 April 2017 period. The lowest-ranking program on the list, Bonus Family, was viewed by 985,000 people.)

=== Season 2 (2018) ===
The permanent panelists of the season were Ola Forssmed, Marika Carlsson, Erik Ekstrand (season winner) and Ellen Bergström.

Season 2 episodes were released on the official Taskmaster YouTube channel on 9 November 2022.

No.	Guest contestant	Winner	Original release date	Swedish viewers
1	Claes Malmberg	Erik Ekstrand	9 March 2018	1,240,000
2	Clara Henry	Clara Henry	16 March 2018	975,000
3	Ann Westin	Erik Ekstrand	23 March 2018	1,324,000
4	Emma Knyckare	Ellen Bergström	30 March 2018	N/A (Note: Bäst i test did not appear on the weekly list of the ten highest viewed TV programs. The lowest-ranking program on the list, Robinson, was viewed by 803,000 people.)
5	Al Pitcher	Ellen Bergström	6 April 2018	N/A (Note: Bäst i test did not appear on the weekly list of the ten highest viewed TV programs. The lowest-ranking program on the list, Bonde söker fru, was viewed by 956,000 people.)
6	Nisse Hallberg	Erik Ekstrand	13 April 2018	N/A (Note: Bäst i test did not appear on the weekly list of the ten highest viewed TV programs. The lowest-ranking program on the list, Farmen VIP, was viewed by 733,000 people.)
7	Moa Lundqvist	Moa Lundqvist	20 April 2018	834,000
8	Thomas Petersson	Ola Forssmed	27 April 2018	N/A (Note: Bäst i test did not appear on the weekly list of the ten highest viewed TV programs. The lowest-ranking program on the list, Tror du jag ljuger?, was viewed by 771,000 people.)

=== Season 3 (2019) ===
The permanent panelists of the season were Anders Jansson, Annika Andersson, Nassim Al Fakir and Clara Henry (season winner). A bonus episode was broadcast a week after episode 7, with the tests that did not make it into the regular season, a tradition which has continued during the following seasons.

No.	Guest contestant	Winner	Original release date	Swedish viewers
1	Per Andersson	Clara Henry	1 March 2019	1,148,000
2	Kristina "Keyyo" Petrushina	Kristina "Keyyo" Petrushina	8 March 2019	1,249,000
3	Emma Molin	Annika Andersson	15 March 2019	1,201,000
4	Måns Nathanaelson	Måns Nathanaelson	22 March 2019	1,064,000
5	Fab Freddie	Clara Henry	29 March 2019	949,000
6	Marika Carlsson	Clara Henry	5 April 2019	1,063,000
7	Oscar Zia	Clara Henry	12 April 2019	1,124,000

=== Season 4 (2020) ===
The permanent panelists of the season were Anders Johansson, Carin da Silva, Kristoffer Appelquist and Kristina Petrushina. The guest contestants accumulated more points than any of the panelists and were declared winners of the season. A bonus episode was broadcast a week after episode 9, with the tests that did not make it into the regular season. A Christmas episode was broadcast on 26 December 2020, a tradition which has continued during the following seasons.

No.	Guest contestant	Winner	Original release date	Swedish viewers
1	Johan Glans	Carin da Silva	6 March 2020	1,481,000
2	Josefin Johansson	Josefin Johansson	13 March 2020	1,495,000
3	Peter Apelgren	Peter Apelgren	20 March 2020	1,331,000
4	Nassim Al Fakir	Carin da Silva	27 March 2020	1,558,000
5	Farah Abadi	Farah Abadi	3 April 2020	1,795,000
6	Kayo Shekoni	Kristoffer Appelquist	10 April 2020	1,644,000
7	Lina Hedlund	Carin da Silva	17 April 2020	1,505,000
8	Özz Nûjen	Özz Nûjen	24 April 2020	1,512,000
9	Henrik Dorsin	Anders Johansson, Carin da Silva and Kristoffer Appelquist	1 May 2020	1,447,000

=== Season 5 (2021) ===
The permanent panelists of the season were Johanna Nordström, Olof Wretling (season winner), Morgan Alling and Arantxa Alvarez. A bonus episode was broadcast a week after episode 9, with the tests that did not make it into the regular season and a christmas episode was broadcast on 25 December 2021.

No.	Guest contestant	Winner	Original release date	Swedish viewers
1	Jesper Rönndahl	Johanna Nordström	26 February 2021	1,944,000
2	Christine Meltzer	Olof Wretling	5 March 2021	1,725,000
3	Anis Don Demina	Olof Wretling	12 March 2021	1,834,000
4	Kristina "Keyyo" Petrushina	Arantxa Alvarez	19 March 2021	1,808,000
5	Fredrik Lindström	Olof Wretling	26 March 2021	1,597,000
6	Niklas Andersson	Morgan Alling	2 April 2021	1,357,000
7	Pernilla Wahlgren	Morgan Alling	9 April 2021	1,527,000
8	David Batra	Morgan Alling	16 April 2021	1,570,000
9	Nour El Refai	Morgan Alling	23 April 2021	1,581,000

=== Season 6 (2022) ===
The permanent panelists of the season were Anis Don Demina, Sofia Dalén, Sussie Eriksson and Marcus Berggren. As in season 4, the guest contestants accumulated more points than any of the panelists and were declared winners of the season. A bonus episode was broadcast a week after episode 9, with the tests that did not make it into the regular season and a Christmas episode was broadcast on 26 December 2022.

No.	Guest contestant(s)	Winner	Original release date	Swedish viewers
1	Erik Johansson	Marcus Berggren	4 March 2022	2,188,000
2	Danny Saucedo and Nassim Al Fakir	Sofia Dalén	11 March 2022	2,102,000
3	Annika Lantz	Anis Don Demina	18 March 2022	1,960,000
4	Lotta Engberg	Lotta Engberg	25 March 2022	1,477,000
5	Fredde Granberg	Sofia Dalén	1 April 2022	1,310,000
6	Vanna Rosenberg	Sofia Dalén	8 April 2022	1,314,000
7	Tareq Taylor	Anis Don Demina	15 April 2022	1,114,000
8	Johanna Nordström	Sofia Dalén	22 April 2022	1,282,000
9	Petrina Solange	Anis Don Demina and Petrina Solange	29 April 2022	1,297,000

=== Season 7 (2023) ===
The permanent panelists of the season were Markoolio, Nikki Amini, Henrik Nyblom and Linnéa Wikblad (season winner). A bonus episode was broadcast a week after episode 9, with the tests that did not make it into the regular season.

No.	Guest contestant	Winner	Original release date	Swedish viewers
1	Måns Möller	Måns Möller	24 February 2023	1,593,000
2	Janne Andersson	Linnéa Wikblad	3 March 2023	1,586,000
3	Carina Berg	Markoolio	10 March 2023	1,568,000
4	Edvin Törnblom	Edvin Törnblom / Linnéa Wikblad	17 March 2023	1,398,000
5	Amie Bramme Sey	Amie Bramme Sey	24 March 2023	1,462,000
6	Marcus Berggren	Linnéa Wikblad	31 March 2023	1,238,000
7	Evelyn Mok	Markoolio	7 April 2023	973,000
8	Johar Bendjelloul	Linnéa Wikblad	14 April 2023	1,264,000
9	Anne Lundberg	Henrik Nyblom	21 April 2023	1,145,000

=== Season 8 (early 2024) ===
The panelists of the season were Behrouz Badreh, Charlotta Björck, Johan Petersson, Maria Lundqvist and Mauri Hermundsson (season winner). Along with the move to TV4, changes were made to the show's format, such as the removal of guest contestants and the extension of the season to 10 competitive episodes.

No.	Episode title	Winner	Original release date	Swedish viewers
1	"Den bara kör och kör"	Mauri Hermundsson	12 January 2024	1,004,000
2	"Världens äckligaste frukt"	Johan Petersson	19 January 2024	N/A (Note: Bäst i test did not appear on the weekly list of the ten highest viewed TV programs. The lowest-ranked program on the list, the 2024 European Men's Handball Championship, was viewed by 833,000 people.)
3	"Finns det tejp så finns det hopp"	Johan Petersson	26 January 2024	779,000
4	"Tråkigt, tycker vi på Nyheterna"	Maria Lundqvist	2 February 2023	1,022,000
5	"Hej, det är Baba Ganoush"	Behrouz Badreh	9 February 2024	1,004,000
6	"Jag kommer spetsa äggplantan"	Charlotta Björck	16 February 2024	1,009,000
7	"Ska jag parkera en sous vide?"	Behrouz Badreh	23 February 2024	978,000
8	"Kossan puttade ut mig på marken"	Behrouz Badreh	1 March 2024	894,000
9	"En räv sitter väl aldrig fel"	Mauri Hermundsson	8 March 2024	822,000
10	"Gorgonzola, det är en ost va?"	Charlotta Björck	15 March 2024	N/A (Note: Bäst i test did not appear on the weekly list of the ten highest viewed TV programs. The lowest-ranking program on the list, the 2023–24 Biathlon World Cup, was viewed by 677,000 people.)

=== Season 9 (late 2024) ===
The panelists of the season are Eric Stern, Lotta Engberg, Marie Agerhäll, Nour El Refai, and Torbjörn Averås Skorup. It premiered on 16 August 2024 on TV4.

No.	Episode title	Winner	Original release date	Swedish viewers
1	"Här kommer ögongodis"	Nour El Refai	16 August 2024	817,000
2	"Dragga efter svärmor i fel sjö"	Eric Stern	23 August 2024	687,000
3	"Åh nej, jag gick i bajs"	Eric Stern	30 August 2024	641,000
4	"Troll i vind"	Torbjörn Averås Skorup	6 September 2024	726,000
5	"Babben är missnöjd"	Nour El Refai	13 September 2024	745,000
6	"Det här är 100% brunsås"	Torbjörn Averås Skorup	20 September 2024	664,000
7	"Väldigt synd på rara ärtor"	Torbjörn Averås Skorup	27 September 2024	743,000
8	"Twice in a Lifetime"	Marie Agerhäll	4 October 2024	697,000
9	"Släpp bowlingen fri!"	Torbjörn Averås Skorup	11 October 2024	696,000
10	"Jag tänker väldigt mycket pingis"	Torbjörn Averås Skorup	18 October 2024	696,000

=== Season 10 (early 2025) ===
The panelists of the season are Gina Dirawi, Christine Meltzer, Jan Rippe, Olle Sarri, and Alfred Svensson. The season premiered on 10 January 2025 on TV4.

No.	Episode title	Winner	Original release date	Swedish viewers
1	"Du ska hänga från buken och powerhanden"	Alfred Svensson	10 January 2025	709,000
2	"Du har ju inga hål!"	Olle Sarri	17 January 2025	N/A (Note: Bäst i test did not appear on the weekly list of the ten highest viewed TV programs for the 13–19 January 2025 period. The lowest-ranking program on the list, the 2024–25 Biathlon World Cup, was viewed by 681,000 people.)
3	"Golf är bland det häftigaste som finns"	Jan Rippe	24 January 2025	N/A (Note: Bäst i test did not appear on the weekly list of the ten highest viewed TV programs for the 20–26 January 2025 period. The lowest-ranking program on the list, Postkodmiljonären, was viewed by 672,000 people.)
4	"Jag har rakat mina armar för det här"	Alfred Svensson	31 January 2025	N/A (Note: Bäst i test did not appear on the weekly list of the ten highest viewed TV programs for the 27 January–2 February 2025 period. The lowest-ranking program on the list, the 2024–25 Biathlon IBU Cup, was viewed by 657,000 people.)
5	"Du heter Baloo idag"	Christine Meltzer	7 February 2025	N/A (Note: Bäst i test did not appear on the weekly list of the ten highest viewed TV programs for the 3–9 February 2025 period. The lowest-ranking program on the list, Svenska nyheter, was viewed by 702,000 people.)
6	"En vagga av toast"	Olle Sarri	14 February 2025	N/A (Note: Bäst i test did not appear on the weekly list of the ten highest viewed TV programs for the 3–9 February 2025 period. The lowest-ranking program on the list, Sveriges mästerkock, was viewed by 714,000 people.)
7	"Aja baja kaka smaka"	Christine Meltzer	21 February 2025	774,000
8	"Vi kommer aldrig få sätta på honom"	Christine Meltzer	28 February 2025	N/A
9	"High five, eventuellt!"	Jan Rippe	7 March 2025	N/A
10	"Linköping"	Gina Dirawi	14 March 2025	N/A

=== Season 11 (late 2025) ===
The panelists of the season are Kirsty Armstrong, Victor Beer, Peter Magnusson, Daniel Nannskog, and Jenny Strömstedt. The season premiered on 17 October 2025 on TV4.

No.	Episode title	Winner	Original release date	Swedish viewers
1	"That's how the frisbee goes!"	Jenny Strömstedt	17 October 2025	N/A
2	"Husse Husse Husse Husse Husse Hussein"	Kirsty Armstrong	24 October 2025	N/A

== Reviews and awards ==
The show has received a negative review by Sylvia Balac from Aftonbladet, calling the show "nonsense" and ending with "Come on, SVT! You should be able to do better than this." Karolina Fjellborg, also from Aftonbladet, gave a slightly more positive review saying that she has "seen worse", but still criticising that it is "another show based on nonsense and air only". Malin Slotte from Hufvudstadsbladet gave also a negative review saying that "SVT have unbuttoned their pants, laid down on the couch, and greatly lowered their ambition".

Awards and nominations for Bäst i Test
Award	Date of ceremony	Category	Result
Kristallen 2018	31 August 2018	Best Entertainment Show	Nominated
Kristallen 2019	30 August 2019	Best Entertainment Show	Nominated
Kristallen 2019	30 August 2019	Best Show	Won
Kristallen 2019	30 August 2019	Best male host, David Sundin	Nominated
Barncancergalan (Childhood Cancer Gala – the Swedish humour award 2019)	30 September 2019	Best Humour Show	Nominated
Kristallen 2020	27 August 2020	Best Show	Nominated
Kristallen 2020	27 August 2020	Best Entertainment Show	Won
Kristallen 2020	27 August 2020	Best female host, Babben Larsson	Nominated
Kristallen 2020	27 August 2020	Best male host, David Sundin	Nominated
Barncancergalan (Childhood Cancer Gala – the Swedish humour award 2020)	28 September 2020	Best Humour Show	Nominated
Barncancergalan (Childhood Cancer Gala – the Swedish humour award 2020)	28 September 2020	Children's Award	Won
Kristallen 2021	27 August 2021	Best Entertainment Show	Nominated
Kristallen 2021	27 August 2021	Viewers Favorite Program	Nominated
Barncancergalan (Childhood Cancer Gala – the Swedish humour award 2021)	27 September 2021	Best Humour Show	Nominated
Barncancergalan (Childhood Cancer Gala – the Swedish humour award 2021)	27 September 2021	Children's Award	Nominated
Kristallen 2022	1 September 2022	Best Entertainment Show	Nominated
Barncancergalan (Childhood Cancer Gala – the Swedish humour award 2022)	26 September 2022	Children's Award	Nominated
Barncancergalan (Childhood Cancer Gala – the Swedish humour award 2023)	2 October 2023	Best Humour Show	Nominated
Barncancergalan (Childhood Cancer Gala – the Swedish humour award 2023)	2 October 2023	Children's Award	Nominated
