= Intresseklubben =

- Title card
- Genre: Comedy
- Presented by: Johan Wester
- Starring: Anders Jansson; Guest panellists
- Theme music composer: Howard Goodall
- Country of origin: Sweden
- No. of series: 4
- No. of episodes: 34 (32 aired/airing on TV and 2 were released only on the Internet through SVT Play)

Production
- Running time: 30 minutes
- Production company: Anagram Production

Original release
- Network: SVT1
- Release: 8 September 2012 – 10 October 2015

Related
- QI (UK); QI (Dutch version); QI (Czech version)

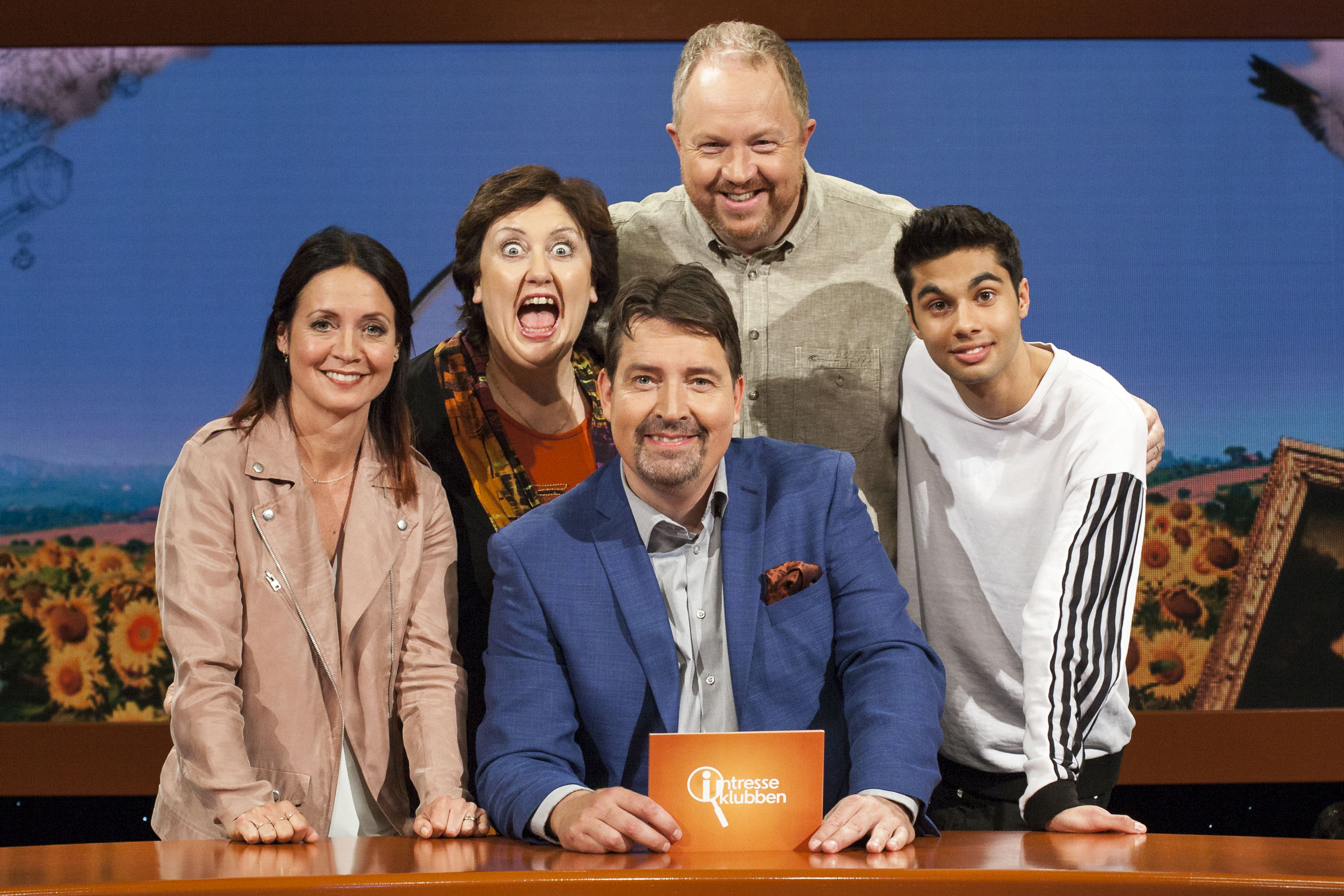
Intresseklubben cast in 2015; L–R: Pernilla Månsson Colt, Babben Larsson, Johan Wester, Anders Jansson and William Spetz.

Intresseklubben (English: "The Interest Club") was a Swedish panel show, aired in Sveriges Television between 2012 and 2015, based on the long-running BBC panel show QI. The show was hosted by Johan Wester, with Anders Jansson as a permanent panellist.

== Format ==
The format is largely based on the QI format, just as in the original there are four panellists (three guest panellists and one permanent panellist). The panellists are mostly comedians, but people from other fields have also appeared, such as astronaut Christer Fuglesang, rally co-driver Tina Thörner, clergyman K.G. Hammar and politicians Maria Wetterstrand and Gudrun Schyman. Each panellist has a buzzer that they can use to attract attention. Usually the buzzers are themed to the episode's theme.

The questions asked are often deliberately misleading or very difficult to answer, and sometimes they are very simple questions about something everyone thinks they know the answer to when the seemingly obvious answer is incorrect. Panellists can earn one point by giving the correct answer or one point for an incorrect but interesting answer; however, they will lose ten points for answers that are not only incorrect, but also painfully obvious. When an incorrect answer is given, an alarm sounds and the incorrect answer is flashed on the screens behind the panel. The main objective is not necessarily to answer all questions correctly, but rather to get an interesting and funny discussion about the topics presented.

The "General Ignorance" round is not played in Intresseklubben, instead each episode usually ends with a special round where panellists need to categorize various things or guess what belongs with what. Examples include the game "Boy, girl, or dish" played in the episode "Abnormt" in season 1 where panellists had to guess if a name in Spanish was a boy's name, a girl's name or a Spanish dish. In episode "Blötdjur" the game was called "Wet, wetter, or Anders Jansson?" and the panellists had to guess which of several options contain the highest percent water. For example, we learned that Lake Don Juan, which is the saltiest lake in the world, contains a lower percentage of water than a human – only about 56%.

== Production ==
Intresseklubben was filmed in front of a live studio audience of around 400 people at the Scandic Star hotel in Lund. Each episode took roughly 70 minutes to record, but was then edited down to fit into a 30-minute timeslot. Research for one season took roughly 6 months to complete; some of it was borrowed from QI, but roughly 80% was fresh research done for Intresseklubben.

== Episodes ==
=== Season A (2012) ===
Just as in the British original QI the seasons follow the letters of the alphabet, and all episodes in season A have a title starting with the letter A. Eight episodes were broadcast on TV and an additional two were released exclusively on the web through SVT Play.

Episode	Title (English translation)	Guests	Winner	Original Broadcast
1	Arvsynd (Original sin)	Johan Glans; K.G. Hammar; Babben Larsson	K.G. Hammar	8 September 2012
2	Abnormt (Abnormal)	Johan Glans; Babben Larsson; Tina Thörner	Babben Larsson	15 September 2012
3	Astralt (Astral)	Peter Apelgren; Christer Fuglesang; Babben Larsson	Babben Larsson	22 September 2012
4	Animalia (Animals)	Johan Glans; Annika Lantz; Göran Rosenberg	Johan Glans	29 September 2012
5	Alarmerande (Alarming)	Petra Mede; Babben Larsson; K.G. Hammar	K.G. Hammar	6 October 2012
6	Kontinenter på A (A-continents)	Babben Larsson; Måns Nilsson; Christer Fuglesang	Christer Fuglesang	13 October 2012
7	A-laget (The A-team)	Babben Larsson; Annika Lantz; Per Naroskin	Anders Jansson	20 October 2012
8	Anstötande (Offensive/Explicit)	Henrik Dorsin; Annika Lantz; Ann Heberlein	Ann Heberlein	27 October 2012
9	Atletiskt (Athletic)	Victoria Dyring; Babben Larsson; Tina Thörner	Victoria Dyring	27 October 2012 (only on SVT Play)
10	Ansträngande (Straining/Effortful)	Johan Glans; Göran Rosenberg; Annika Lantz	Johan Glans	27 October 2012 (only on SVT Play)

=== Season B (2013) ===
The second series, consisting of 8 episodes covering the letter B, was recorded in August 2013 and aired on SVT1 during September and October the same year, plus 2 specials during the Christmas times.

Episode	Title (English translation)	Guests	Winner	Original Broadcast
11	Blötdjur (Molluscs)	Johan Glans; Ann Heberlein; Annika Lantz	Johan Glans	7 September 2013
12	Blommor & bin (The birds and the bees)	Annika Lantz; Kattis Ahlström; Jesper Rönndahl	Jesper Rönndahl	14 September 2013
13	Bostad (Residence)	Babben Larsson; Maria Wetterstrand; Kristoffer Svensson	Maria Wetterstrand	21 September 2013
14	Bombastiskt (Bombastic)	Annika Lantz; Göran Everdahl; Suzanna Dzamic	Annika Lantz	28 September 2013
15	Bedrägligt (Deceptive)	Karin Adelsköld; Babben Larsson; Gudrun Schyman	Babben Larsson	5 October 2013
16	Blandat (Miscellaneous)	Alexandra Pascalidou; Babben Larsson; Kristoffer Appelquist	Babben Larsson	12 October 2013
17	Baktanke (Ulterior motives)	Babben Larsson; Martin Ingvar; Pia Johansson	Anders Jansson	29 December 2013
18	Bot & bättring (Cures & improvements)	Johan Glans; Annika Lantz; Ann Heberlein	Ann Heberlein	5 January 2014

=== Season C (2014) ===
A third season, this time about the letter C, was recorded in June 2014 and aired during the autumn 2014. New guests in the C-season included comedians Marika Carlsson and David Batra, radio host Kodjo Akolor and high jumper and Olympic gold medallist Stefan Holm. The season premiere aired on 1 November.

Episode	Title (English translation)	Guests	Winner	Original Broadcast
19	Celebriteter (Celebrities)	Babben Larsson; Annika Lantz; David Batra	Annika Lantz	1 November 2014
20	Celibat (Celibacy)	Jesper Rönndahl; Emma Knyckare; Ann Heberlein	Jesper Rönndahl	8 November 2014
21	Chock (Shocking)	Babben Larsson; Kodjo Akolor; Josefin Johansson	Kodjo Akolor	15 November 2014
22	Camping (Camping)	Annika Andersson; Hans Rosenfeldt; Claudia Galli Concha	Hans Rosenfeldt	22 November 2014
23	Charkuteri (Charcuterie)	Marika Carlsson; Annika Lantz; Babben Larsson	Anders Jansson	29 November 2014
24	Civilisation (Civilization)	Babben Larsson; Stefan Holm; Annika Lantz	Babben Larsson	6 December 2014
25	Celler (Cells)	Kattis Ahlström; Anders Johansson; Marika Carlsson; Hans Rosenfeldt (Note: Anders Jansson was absent for this episode.)	Anders Johansson	13 December 2014
26	Celebrera (Celebrate)	Josefin Johansson; Jesper Rönndahl; Helena von Zweigbergk	Jesper Rönndahl	20 December 2014

=== Season D (2015) ===
A D-season consisting of eight episodes aired during the autumn 2015. The episodes aired on Saturday nights at 9 PM, with the season premiere on 22 August.

Episode	Title (English translation)	Guests	Winner	Original Broadcast
27	Dieter (Diets)	William Spetz; Pernilla Månsson Colt; Babben Larsson	William Spetz	22 August 2015
28	Doft (Scent)	Josefin Johansson; Alexandra Pascalidou; Hans Rosenfeldt	Hans Rosenfeldt	29 August 2015
29	Danmark (Denmark)	Johan Glans; Nisti Stêrk; Babben Larsson	Nisti Stêrk	5 September 2015
30	Dålig stämning (Bad atmosphere)	Jesper Rönndahl; Karin Adelsköld; Anna Charlotta Gunnarsson	Jesper Rönndahl	12 September 2015
31	Döden (Death)	Anders Johansson; Lina Thomsgård; Josefin Johansson	Lina Thomsgård	19 September 2015
32	Dumheter (Stupidity)	Jesper Rönndahl; Marika Carlsson; Karin Gyllenklev	Anders Jansson	26 September 2015
33	Dating (Dating)	Clara Henry; Stefan Holm; Babben Larsson	Clara Henry	3 October 2015
34	Dramatik (Drama)	Babben Larsson; Barbro Fällman; Johan Glans	Johan Glans	10 October 2015
