= Robins (talk show) =

- Starring: Robin Paulsson
- Country of origin: Sweden
- No. of seasons: 4
- No. of episodes: 36

Production
- Running time: 30 minutes

Original release
- Network: SVT2 (season 1); SVT1 (season 2-)
- Release: August 23, 2006

Robins is a Swedish late-night talk show which premiered on SVT2 on August 23, 2006. The host is the young stand-up comedian Robin Paulsson from Malmö. The show's format is similar to that of other late-night shows, Robin makes jokes about recent news, shows sketches, and talks to a guest in the studio.

One of the most popular sketches in the show features Robin appearing as Swedish football player Zlatan Ibrahimović.

== Guests on Robins ==
=== Season 1 (2006) ===
- August 23, 2006: Anders Jansson
- August 30, 2006: Allan Svensson
- September 6, 2006: Johan Glans and David Batra
- September 13, 2006: Tina Thörner
- September 20, 2006: Anders Johansson and Måns Nilsson
- September 27, 2006: Bengt Frithiofsson
- October 4, 2006: Anna Blomberg
- October 11, 2006: Peter Settman
- October 18, 2006: Claes af Geijerstam
- October 25, 2006: Måns Zelmerlöw

=== Season 2 (2007) ===
- April 11, 2007: Bert Karlsson and Peter Magnusson
- April 18, 2007: Magnus Betnér and Marie Lindberg
- April 25, 2007: Morgan Alling and Lill-Babs
- May 2, 2007: Janne Josefsson and Filip Hammar
- May 9, 2007: Rikard Palm and Björn Hellberg
- May 16, 2007: Annika Andersson and Knut Knutsson
- May 23, 2007: Eva Hamilton and Måns Möller
