= Al Pitcher =

New Zealand stand-up comedian

Alan Geoffrey Pitcher (born 28 March 1972) is a New Zealand stand-up comedian who works and lives in Sweden. Pitcher was born in Huddersfield, England but grew up in New Zealand. He now lives in Stockholm with his wife Anita Pitcher and the couple have two children. He studied at John Paul College in Rotorua, New Zealand. He started his stand-up career in 1999 when he made it to the final of So You Think You're Funny. Since then he has appeared in the final of "The Daily Telegraph Open Mic Awards", worked for the BBC and performed at England's biggest stand up clubs. Pitcher had his Swedish stand up debut in 2009 and the same year he also won the Best Show category at the Leicester Comedy Festival, Directors Pick 2009 at the Newcastle Comedy festival and Peoples Choice Award 2009 by Time Out Sydney.

Since February 2011, he has worked for Comedy Central LIVE with stand up and was awarded the title Male stand up of the year at Svenska Stand up-galan. He wrote the humorous book Begravda elefanter, released in Swedish in 2012, translated by Mattias Boström and Christina Hammarström. In 2013, he appeared in the show Settman på plats broadcast on SVT in several episodes. He has also been a guest on the Swedish talk-show Robins several times between 2009 and 2017, and appeared as a guest on the second series of Bäst i Test.
