= Statement Festival =

Music festival in Sweden

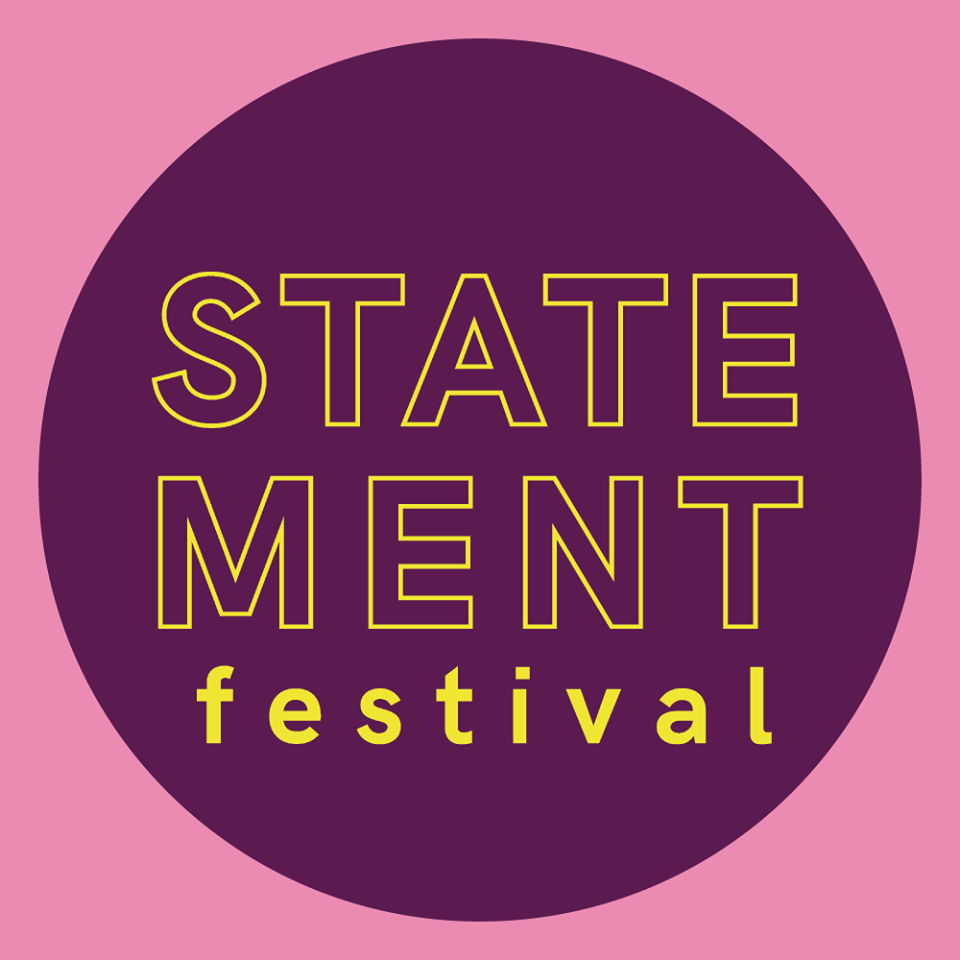
- Genre: Indie pop, stand-up comedy, poetry
- Dates: 31 August – 1 September 2018
- Locations: Gothenburg, Sweden
- Years active: 2018–present
- Website: www.statementfestival.se/en/

The Statement Festival is a music festival in Sweden for women, non-binary and transgender persons. It took place in Gothenburg from 31 August to 1 September 2018 and aims to be held annually. The organizers stated that the festival would be held "without men", in practice meaning a festival only for people who are women, non-binary or transgender persons. The festival's backstage area was jokingly dubbed a "man-pen" (Swedish: manshage) by organisers, in reference to male technicians, managers and members of artists' entourages who would generally reside there. For visitors there is an 18 year age limit.

== History ==
The idea of a "man-free festival" came from comedian Emma Knyckare after several festivals in the preceding seasons such as Bråvalla Festival and We Are Sthlm had problems with rape and sexual assault among the festivalgoers. She presented the idea on Twitter and the number of positive responses she received encouraged her to organise the event. In 2017 a crowdfunding Kickstarter campaign raised about 50,000 euro towards organising the festival. Approximately 30 additional organisers joined in the following months. In a September 2017 interview, the organisers discussed having hired lawyers to provide legal counsel with regard to legislation on the equal treatment of men and women.

In May 2018, Emma Knyckare added a long term goal to the festival: to open the festival also to all men. The festival received 200,000 kronor in state subsidies from the Swedish Arts Council in 2018.

Among the booked artists are Frida Hyvönen and Dolores Haze, Maxida Märak, Radula, Beatrice Eli, Ionnalee and British rock band Girlschool. Comedians Nour El-Refai and Josefin Johansson will also appear.

== Discrimination ==
In July 2018, the Swedish Equality Ombudsman initiated an inquiry on whether the organisers are breaking the laws prohibiting discrimination based on gender. The organisers replied to the discrimination ombudsman that non-transgender men were allowed entrance. In December 2018, the Equality Ombudsman ruled that not welcoming men who aren't transgender as well as calling the festival "man free" constituted gender discrimination.
