= Tror du jag ljuger? =

- Genre: Comedy Panel game
- Based on: Would I Lie to You?
- Presented by: Anna Mannheimer
- Starring: Fredrik Lindström; Johan Glans
- Theme music composer: Johan Toorell; Christoffer Roth
- Country of origin: Sweden
- Original language: Swedish
- No. of seasons: 4
- No. of episodes: 26

Production
- Producers: Henrik Schyffert; Stefan Wiik
- Production company: Brommamamma AB

Original release
- Network: SVT1
- Release: March 19, 2016

Tror du jag ljuger? (Swedish: Do you think I am lying?) is a Swedish comedy panel show made by Brommamamma AB for Sveriges Television first aired on March 19, 2016 and is based on the British original Would I Lie to You?.

In the show, there are two teams with three panelists each. The panelists take turns to tell about different characteristics about themselves and events in their life, whilst the opposite team have to guess whether these stories are true or false. The show is hosted by Anna Mannheimer and the constant team leaders are Fredrik Lindström and Johan Glans.

== Transmissions ==
Episode	Participants		Air date
Episode	Team Lindström	Team Glans	Air date
1	Johan Rheborg; Emma Knyckare	Kattis Ahlström; Micke Leijnegard	March 19, 2016
2	Peter Magnusson; Doreen Månsson	Erik Haag; Lotta Lundgren	April 2, 2016 (Note: The second episode was aired two weeks after the first)
3	William Spetz; Maria Wetterstrand	Julia Frej; Kristoffer Appelquist	April 9, 2016
4	Pernilla Wahlgren; Andreas T Olsson	Marika Carlsson; Henry Bowers	April 16, 2016
5	David Batra; Ebba Witt-Brattström	Anders Johansson; Jessika Gedin	April 23, 2016
6	Carolina Gynning; Niklas Källner	Petrina Solange; Mark Levengood	
7	Renée Nyberg; Knut Knutson	Shima Niavarani; Peter Apelgren	
8	Kakan Hermansson; Per Andersson	Marie Göranzon; Kalle Moraeus	
9	Kristian Luuk; Tommy Körberg	Henrik Dorsin; Tina Nordström	
