= Robin Paulsson =

Swedish stand-up comedian, screenwriter and television presenter

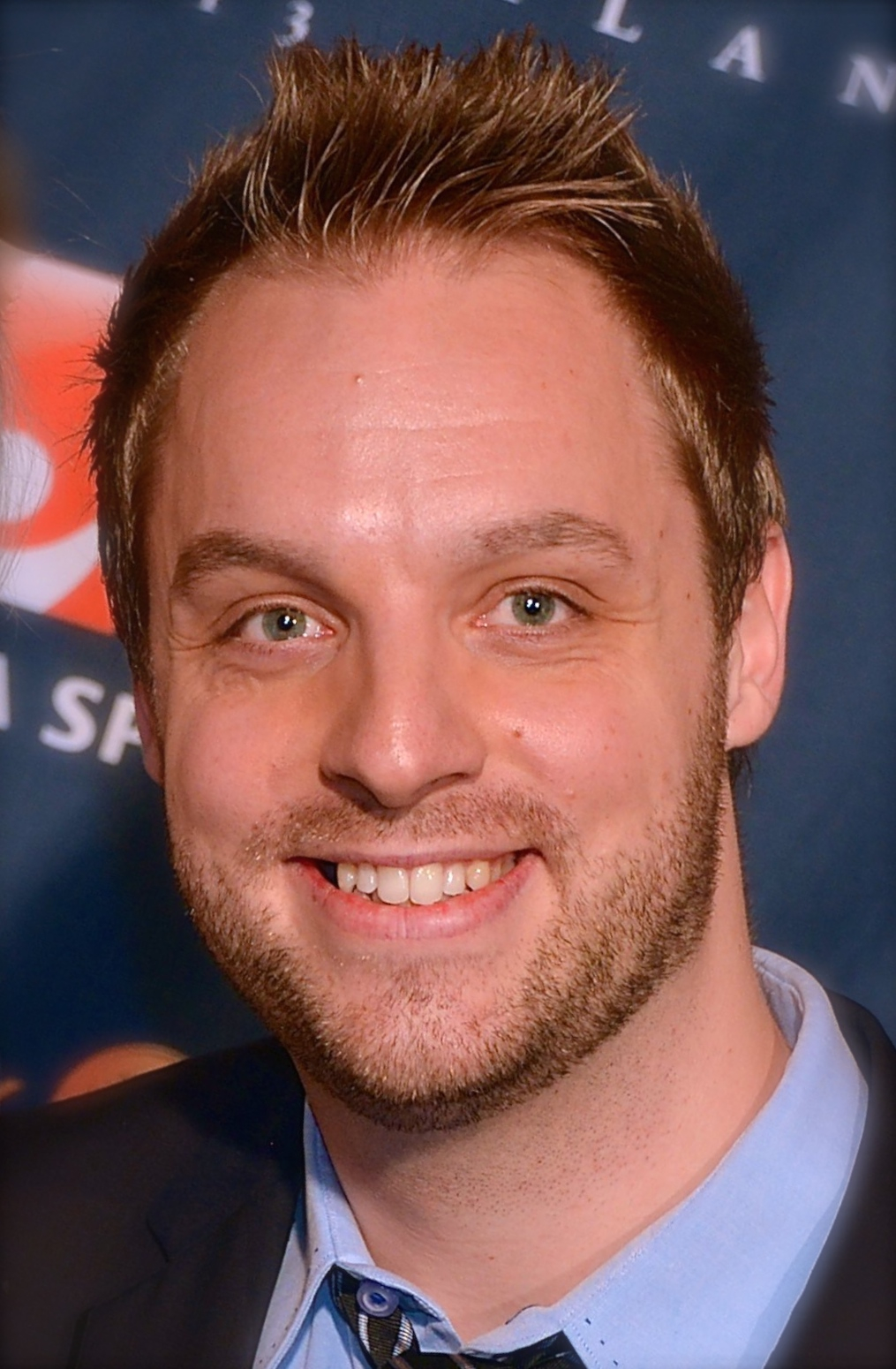
- Paulsson at the 2013 Swedish Athletes Gala
- Born: 28 December 1983 (age 42); Åkarp, Sweden
- Occupations: Television presenter, comedian, screenwriter
- Years active: 2001–present
- Spouse: Live Lausund
- Children: 1

Robin Paulsson (born 28 December 1983) is a Swedish stand-up comedian, screenwriter and television presenter.

== Career ==
Paulsson made his debut as a stand-up comedian in 2001, and as a television presenter in 2006 with his own talk show Robins on Swedish television SVT. He became known for his imitations of footballer Zlatan Ibrahimović. He has also participated in Stockholm Live and in the radio shows Deluxe and Hej Domstol.

In 2003, he received the award Roligast i Skåne (en:Funniest in Skåne (at Sveriges Radio's P3 Humorfestival and in 2004 he became "Årets Nykomling" (Newcomer of the Year) at the Svenska Stand-up-galan. Paulsson has written the script for the SVT comedy series Kvarteret Skatan and Extra allt. He has participated in TV4's comedy series Parlamentet. Paulsson has written for the comedy show Time Out on TV3 and participated in the show on one occasion. He has participated in the TV3 comedy show Extra Extra, which is hosted by Måns Möller. During 2007 he participated in the TV4 comedy show Tack gode gud (Thank you god).

Paulsson presented the Svenska idrottsgalan 2011 (Swedish Athletes Gala) on 17 January 2011, and the Svenska idrottsgalan 2012 on 16 January 2012.

On 29 September 2014, Paulsson and Sanna Nielsen were announced as the hosts of Melodifestivalen 2015, the Swedish national selection for the Eurovision Song Contest 2015 in Austria.

== Personal life ==
Robin Paulsson is married to Live Lausund from Norway and the couple's first child was born in late 2014.
