= Disney Club =

Production
- Production company: Buena Vista Productions

Original release
- Network: Rai 1 Rai 2
- Release: 1991 – 2006

Disney Club is the name of many television shows associated to Disney productions aired mostly in Europe, Latin America and Asia during the 1990s and early 2000s (decade). Some versions used the opening and instrumental from The Disney Afternoon, changing only the logo.

== Latin America ==
- Brazil: It originally debuted as a simple block of cartoons on May 2, 1993, shown on Sunday mornings on Globo. At the end of 1995, it started to be shown on Monday to Friday mornings as a block of the TV Colosso program, being presented by a puppet character José Carioca (Marco Antônio Costa). It started to be shown on SBT in 1997, under a new format created by Cao Hamburger and totally different from other versions: the program showed a boy (Diego Ramiro) who decides to create an "illegal" TV channel together with his friends to show cartoons Disney in prime time, airing Monday through Friday nights. In 2001, it changed its name to Disney CRUJ and began to be shown on the network's Saturday mornings, being replayed by Disney Channel later. Its last unreleased episode was shown in mid-2003.
- Mexico: named Disney Club, aired from 1998 on Azteca 7 (TV Azteca). The show was renewed in 2001 with a new format and animated series.
- Ecuador: named Disney Club, aired on Teleamazonas
- Chile: named El Club Disney, aired on Canal 13
- Colombia: named Tu Hora Disney, aired on Cadena Uno (Canal 1)

== Europe ==
- France: aired on TF1 from 7 January 1990 to 27 December 1998
- Germany: aired between 1991 and 1995 on ARD, then 1996–2001 on RTL
- Greece: aired on Mega Channel from January 1994 to July 2002
- Croatia: aired in RTL Kockica
- Serbia: aired on Happy TV during 2016
- Russia: aired on Channel One from 4 January 1998 to 9 March 2014
- Italy: aired on Rai 1 (from 1991 to 2000) and Rai 2 (from 2000 to 2006, renamed Club Disney in the 2004-2005 season)
- Netherlands: aired on NCRV from 1989 to 1992
- United Kingdom: The Disney Club aired between 1989 and 1998 on ITV
- Ukraine: aired on NLO TV from 1 January 2019 to 11 July 2022
- Sweden: named Disneyklubben, aired from August 27, 1992, to December 31, 1993, on SVT1 and was hosted by Alice Bah, Eva Röse, and Johan Petersson.
- Ireland: Disney Club was aired on RTÉ Two in the 1990s, dating back to around September 21, 1997.
- Portugal: named Clube Disney aired on 1991–1994 on Canal 1, 1996–2001 on RTP2 and RTP1
- Spain: named Club Disney, aired on 1991–1998 on TVE 1, 1998–2003 on Telecinco, 2003–2007 (renamed as Zona Disney) again on TVE 1
- Romania: named Clubul Disney, aired on 2004-2013 on TVR 1

== Asia ==
- India: aired in 1995 on DD Metro
- Indonesia: aired from 1996 to 2006 on Indosiar, from 2010 to 2020 on RCTI and MNCTV
- Philippines: aired on TV5 from 2010 as a cartoon block
- Thailand: aired on BBTV CH 7 HD from 1992 to 2021
- Vietnam: aired on VTV2 from 16 January to 13 November 2016. Unlike many countries, the Disney Club block in VTV2 also broadcast many television shows from Disney Junior, including Sofia the First and Jake and the Never Land Pirates.

== See also ==
- The Mickey Mouse Club
