= Leif Mannerström =

Swedish restaurateur

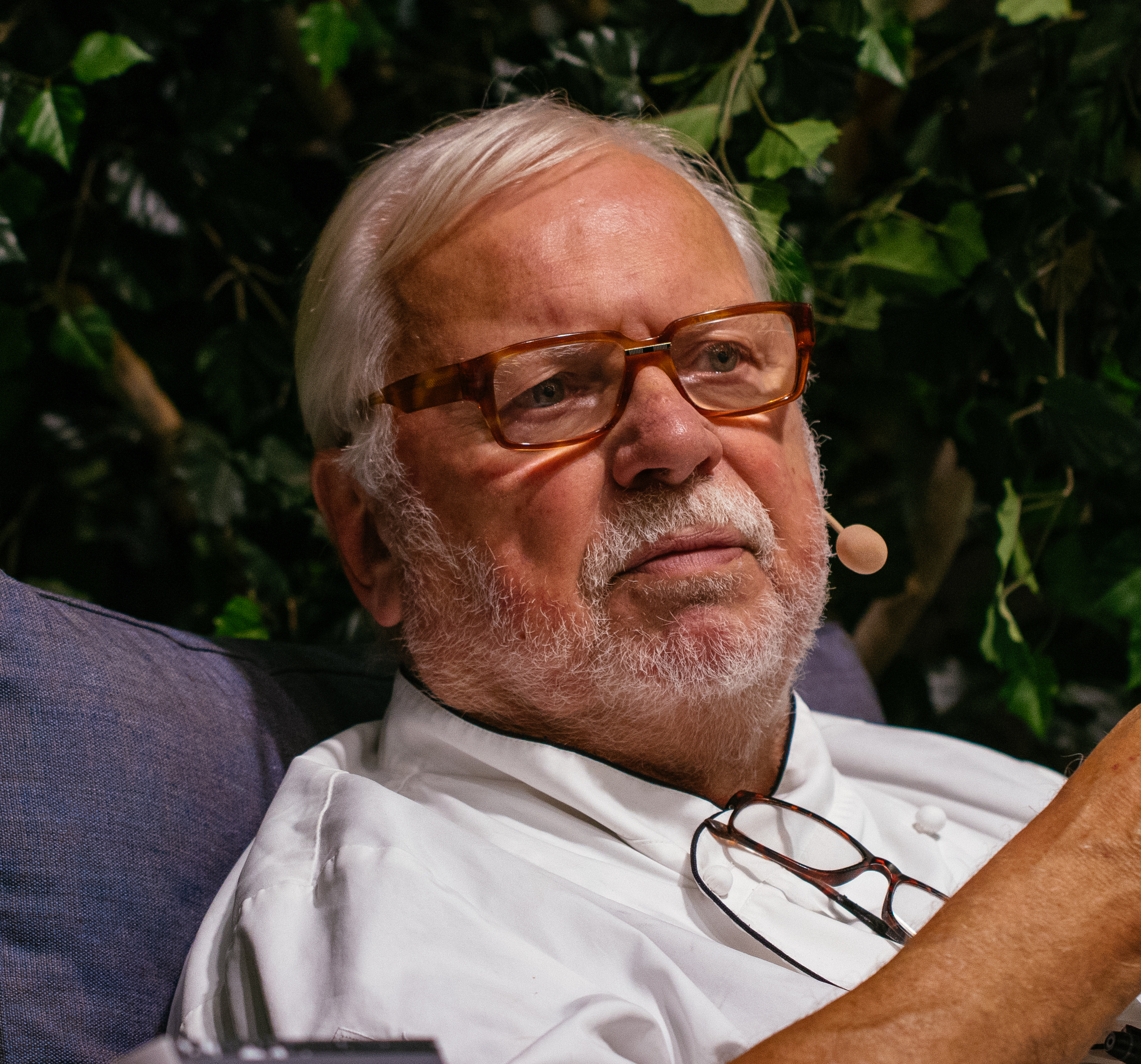
Leif Mannerström in 2018.

Leif Reinhold Mannerström (born 17 March 1940 in Stockholm) is a Swedish restaurateur. Between 1994 and 2010 he ran the restaurant Sjömagasinet in Gothenburg. He was one of the judges in the cooking shows Sveriges mästerkock and "Sveriges yngsta mästerkock" that are broadcast on TV4. Mannerström has run several restaurants like Golfrestaurangen in Hovås, Johanna and Kometen in Gothenburg, Aquarella at the Canary Islands, Belle Avenue in Gothenburg, Mannerström & Jansson and Steak.

Mannerström was a contestant on the cooking show Kockarnas kamp in 2012, he currently runs the restaurant Kometen at Vasagatan in Gothenburg.
