= Markus Aujalay =

Swedish chef

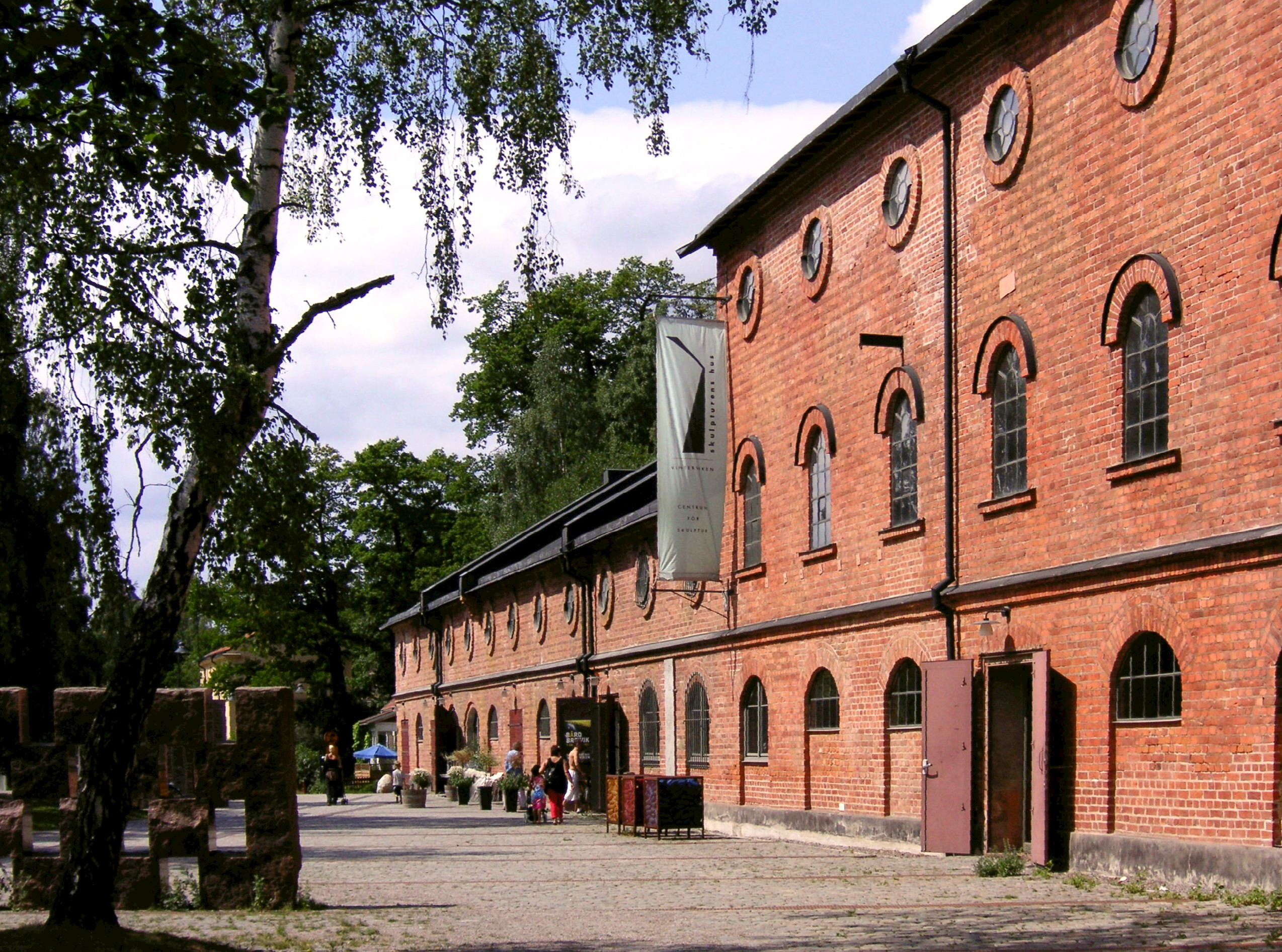
Restaurant Winterviken in Stockholm.

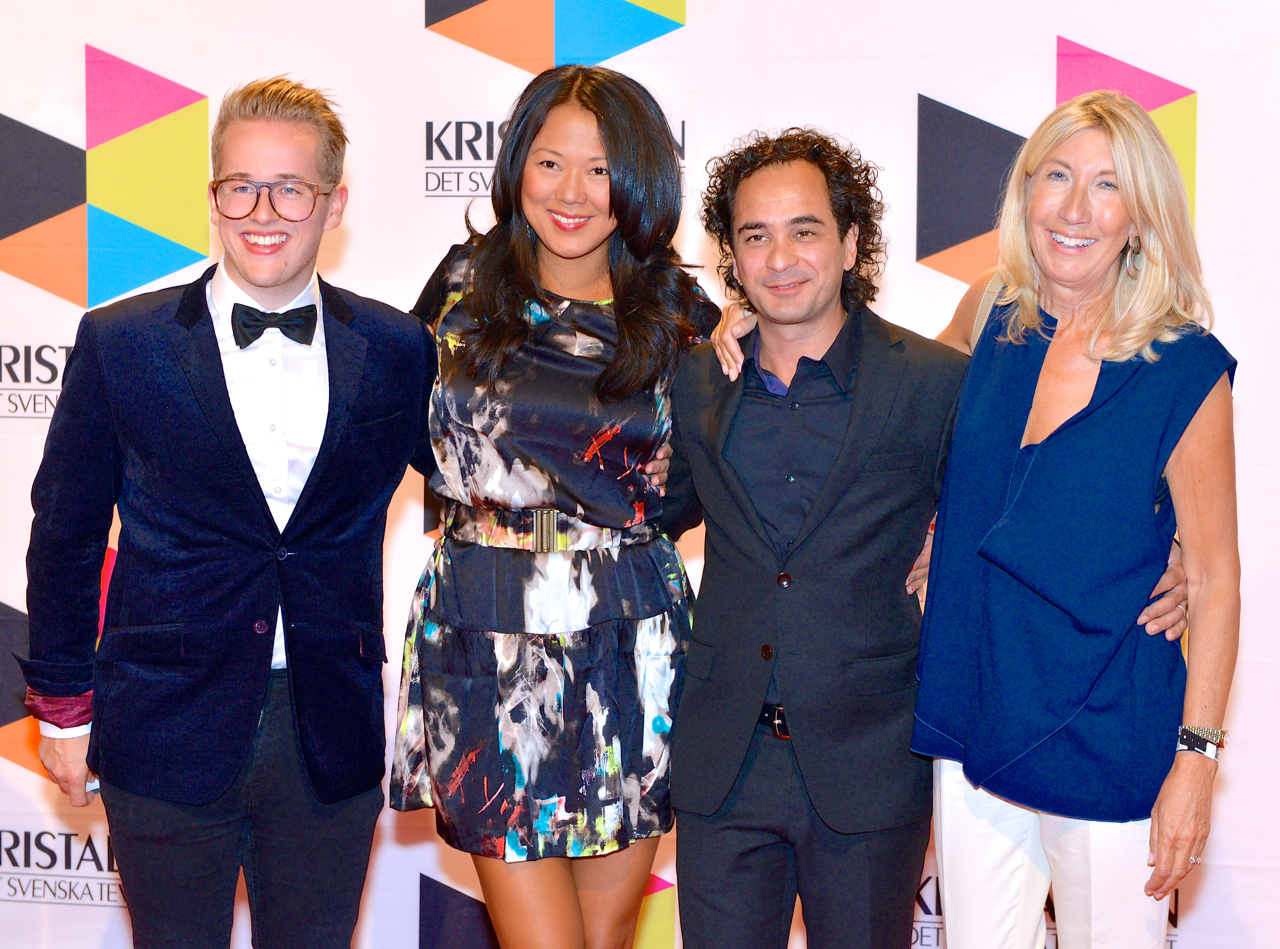
Sveriges mästerkock (Masterchef Sweden) was awarded the winner of Kristallen 2013 for the docusoap of the year. Markus Aujalay (chef, judge) and Lena Styren (producer) at the right.

Nils Markus Aujalay (born 30 April 1971, in Uppsala) is a Swedish chef who participates in several cooking shows on Swedish TV4 (Sweden). He was awarded Chef of the Year in 2004.

== Biography ==
Markus Aujalay has a Burmese father and a Swedish mother. His grandfather was born in Punjab, northern India, and emigrated to Burma when he was 17 years old. Once there, he had a son who moved to England and met Markus' mother.

Aujalay's first work as a chef was at Arlandia Hotel a few years after senior high school. He was then employed at Operakällaren. Aujalay has since worked in the restaurant Fredsgatan 12 and runs the restaurant service in Winterviken, both in Stockholm; Fjällpuben in Åre; and participates in the jury of the TV show Sveriges mästerkock (Masterchef Sweden) and Sveriges yngsta mästerkock (Masterchef Junior of Sweden) on TV4.

In 2000, Aujalay was awarded Årets gröna kock (new chef of the year) and Årets viltkock (wild game meat chef of the year). In 2004 he was awarded Chef of the Year.

Aujalay has published the books Mat hemma och på krogen (2005), Med mycket grönt (2009), Måndag-torsdag : riktig mat för familjen (2010), Mina favoriter från Barcelona (2011), Markus pasta (2012), Markus kokbok - plockmat, vardagslyx, söndagsmiddag och desserter (2012), Markus höst- och vintermat (2014) and Markus vår- och sommarmat (2015).

He also has his own wines, red and rose, "Signature by Markus Aujalay."
