= Nassim Al Fakir =

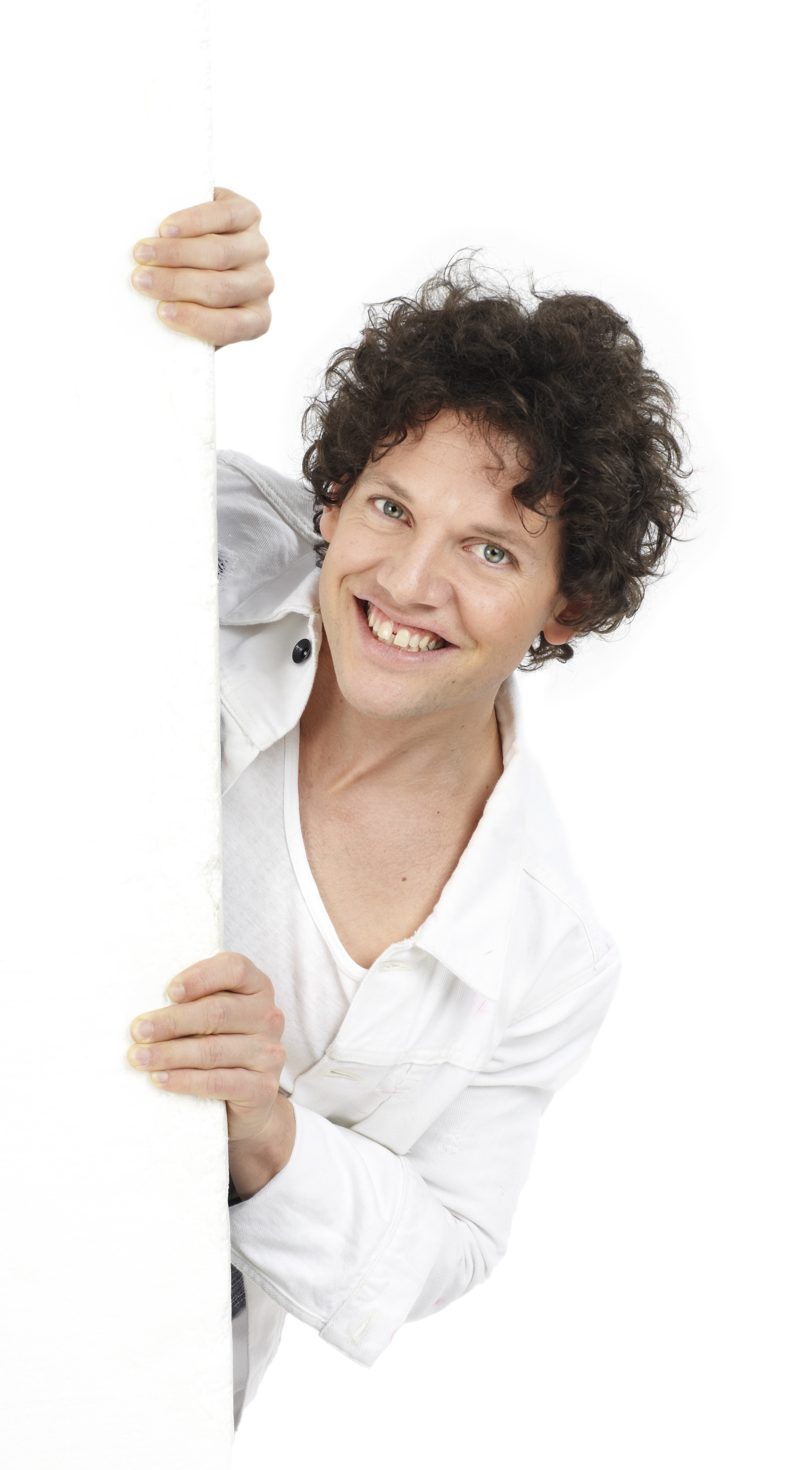
- Al Fakir in 2011

Background information
- Born: Stefan Nassim Al Fakir; 21 March 1977 (age 49); Stockholm, Sweden
- Genres: Pop, jazz
- Occupations: Musician, presenter, comedian
- Instrument: Drums
- Years active: 2006–present
- Label: EMI

Stefan Nassim Al Fakir (Arabic: نسيم الفقير; born 21 March 1977) is a Swedish musician, presenter, comedian, master of ceremonies, moderator and lecturer for children and adolescents. Al Fakir was the host of children's television block Bolibompa on Swedish television SVT. He plays drums and has played in several bands, often with his younger brother Salem Al Fakir.

== Early life ==
Al Fakir was born in Stockholm, Sweden to a Syrian father (Nabil) originally from Damascus, and a Swedish mother (Inger). Nassim is the third of six siblings (Aminah, Ayman, Nassim, Salem, Sami and Fares). As a student Al Fakir attended the Adolf Fredrik's Music School in Stockholm.

Nassim is engaged to singer Lina Hedlund, and they have two sons: Tilo, born 20 March 2012, and Eide, born 6 October 2016.

== Career ==
Al Fakir's television career began on TV4's digital channels before joining SVT's Bolibompa. Prior to this he was doing fashion shows and advertising jobs for different agencies. Since 2007, Nassim Al Fakir gained visibility as the host of the youth program Anaconda on Swedish radio-television UR / SVT. In 2008, and 2009 he served as host for Vi i femman and Lilla Melodifestivalen in 2008. Before Christmas 2008, he presented the popular show Julkalendern i Sveriges Television (Sveriges Television's Christmas calendar).

In April–May 2011, he starred in the musical Pippi Långstrump – ett äventyr på is (Pippi Longstocking – an adventure on ice), including Tobbe Wizard, Marika Lagerkrantz and Stefan Sauk.

On 17 April 2013, Nassim Al Fakir received Alfons-Bokalen award of Alfons Åberg Culture in Gothenburg.

He participated in Let's Dance 2016 which was broadcast on TV4.

In 2019, Al Fakir was part of the permanent panel in SVT's production Bäst i Test.

In 2021, he participated as a robot in Masked Singer Sverige. That same year, he was a mole in the fifth season of De Mol.

== Discography ==
=== Album ===
- 2012: Ute ok cyklar

== Filmography ==
- 2008: Total Drama Island (Owen's voice)
- 2010: På kroken (Fish Hooks) (Milo's voice)
- 2013: LasseMajas detektivbyrå – von Broms hemlighet
- 2013: Frost (Frozen) (Olaf's voice)
- 2014: LasseMajas detektivbyrå – Skuggor över Valleby
- 2015: LasseMajas detektivbyrå – Stella Nostra
- 2016: The Angry Birds Movie (Chuck's voice)
