= Johan Petersson (comedian) =

Swedish comedian

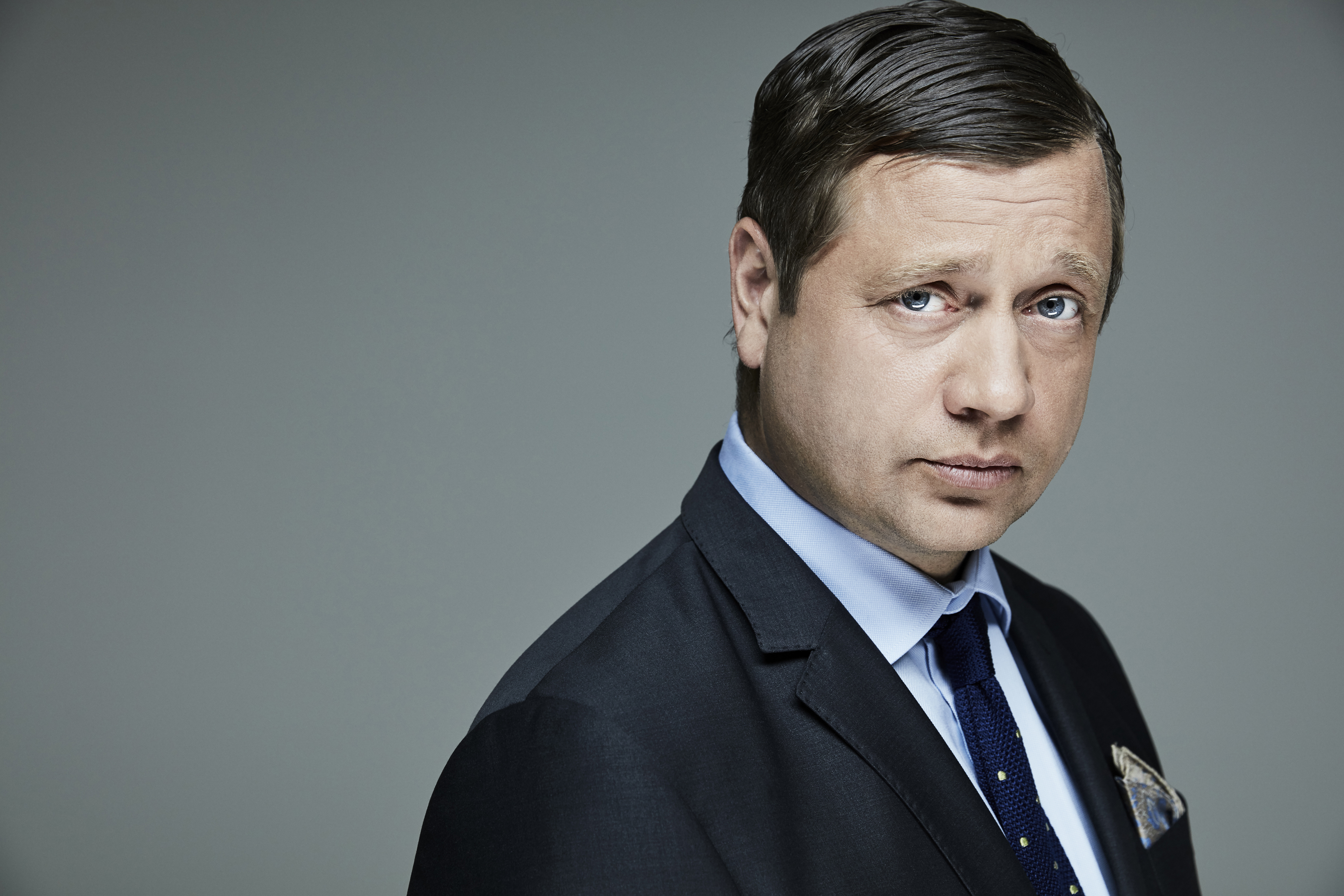
- Johan Petersson in 2016
- Born: 10 February 1969 (age 57); Malmö, Sweden
- Occupations: Television presenter, author, comedian

Johan Petersson (born 10 February 1969) is a Swedish comedian, actor, television presenter and author.

Petersson started his career in 1992 when presenting the Disneyklubben, the Swedish version of the Disney Club, which was broadcast on SVT, this along with Alice Bah Kuhnke and Eva Röse. Between 1994 and 1995, Petersson along with Mia Ståhl Broborg and Nicke Wagemyr participated in the Apolloteaterns play Ståmatålmannen.

He never himself applied to stage school but went to summer theater school class in 1996. There he met Peter Settman and Fredde Granberg, this led to several TV productions together.

In 2006, Petersson wrote three children's books with the miniseries Den sista snapphanen. He used the name Johan F. Petersson on his published books.

He presented the Swedish version of Hole in the Wall on TV6 in 2009, and Jag vet vad du gjorde förra lördagen on TV3, also in 2009. In later years Petersson has acted in several comedy shows on Kanal 5, like, Cafe Bärs, Partaj and Helt perfekt.

Between 2011 and 2015, he participated in the humor program Partaj on Kanal 5 and in the spin-off Café Bärs that had premiere in 2013. At the Kristallen 2012, 2013 and 2015, Partaj won Kristallen for year's humor program.

In 2018, he acted in the children's film Hotell Gyllene Knorren – filmen. In 2017, he had a leading role in the children's film Monky.

== Bibliography ==
- Fångad i framtiden. B. Wahlströms ungdomsböcker, 99-0117885-1; 3253. Den siste snapphanen; 1. Stockholm: 2006. ISBN 91-32-14964-6
- Jakten på Loshultsskatten. B. Wahlströms ungdomsböcker, 99-0117885-1; 3254. Den siste snapphanen; 2. Stockholm: 2006. ISBN 91-32-14965-4
- Häxans hemlighet. B. Wahlströms ungdomsböcker, 99-0117885-1; 3263. Den siste snapphanen; 3. Stockholm: 2007. ISBN 978-91-32-15042-5
