= Anders Jansson =

Swedish comedian

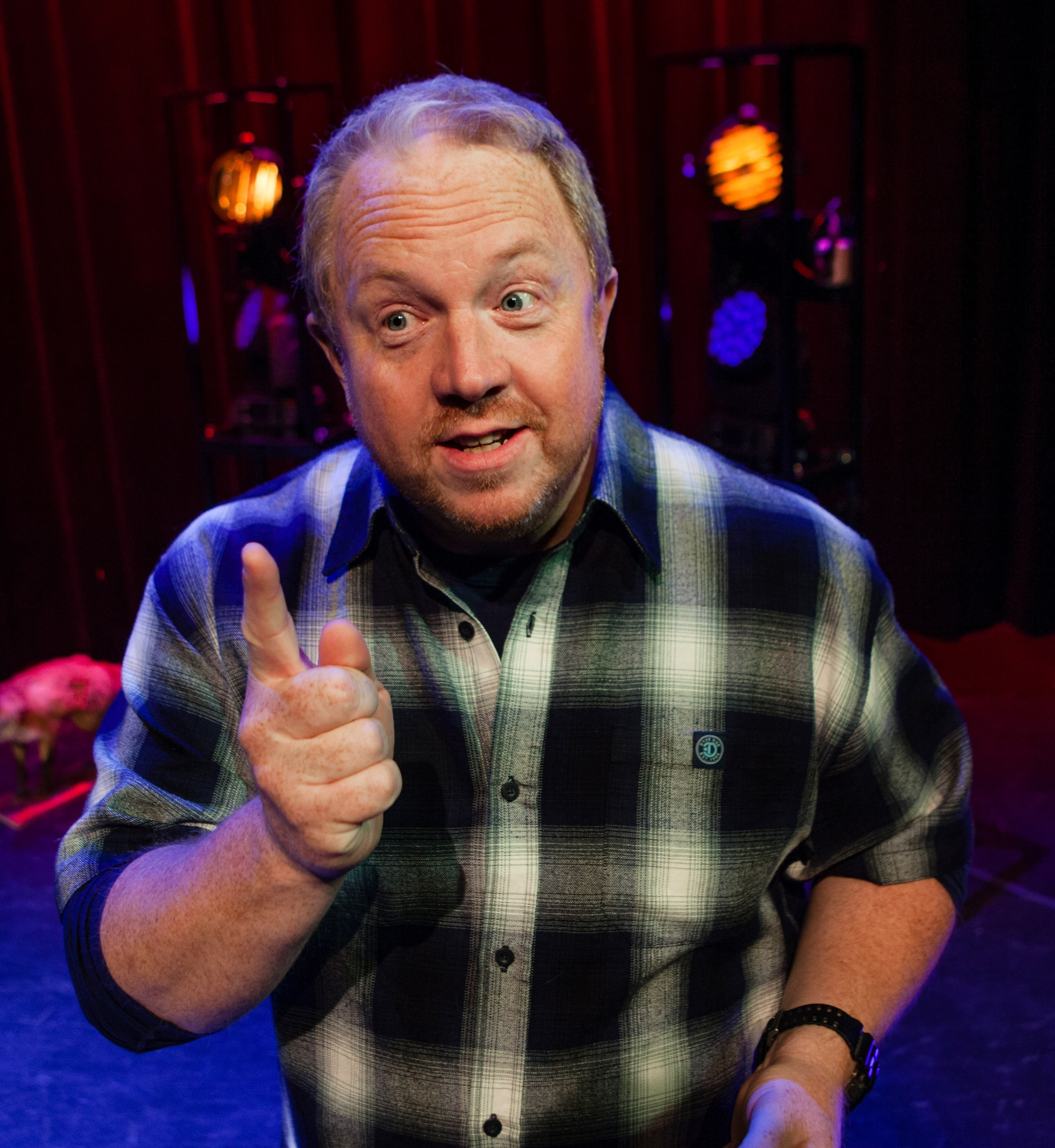
- Born: Lars Anders Jansson; 9 October 1967 (age 58); Staffanstorp, Sweden
- Occupations: Television presenter, comedian, actor

Lars Anders Jansson, (born 9 October 1967 in Staffanstorp), is a Swedish comedian known for such TV-shows as Hipp Hipp and Intresseklubben, the Swedish version of QI.

Jansson, as well as his close companion Johan Wester, started out his entertaining career doing student horseplay at Lund University.

Jansson, again with Wester, worked as scriptwriter for the TV-show Snacka om nyheter (Have I Got News For You).

In 2010, he did the part of Sir Bedevere in the Swedish production of Spamalot at Nöjesteatern in Malmö. In the fall of 2012 SVT started airing Intresseklubben, a Swedish version of the BBC-show QI, where Jansson took on the Alan Davies-role of regular panellist.

Jansson hosted Melodifestivalen 2014 along with Nour El-Refai.
