= Sveriges mästerkock =

Swedish competitive reality television cooking show

- Sveriges Mästerkock/ Swedish Masterchef
- Genre: Cooking show
- Judges: Current: Mischa Billing (2015–); Tom Sjöstedt (2021-); Tommy Myllymäki (2023-); Former: Markus Aujalay (2011– 2022); Leif Mannerström (2011–2020); Anders Dahlbom (2014); Per Morberg (2011–2013)
- Opening theme: "Rush" by Linda Sundblad
- Country of origin: Sweden
- Original language: Swedish
- No. of seasons: 1
- No. of episodes: 15

Production
- Executive producer: Matilda Snöwall (TV4)
- Producer: Tina Graffman
- Production locations: Gävle & Stockholm
- Running time: 43 minutes
- Production company: Meter Television

Original release
- Network: TV4
- Release: 12 January 2011 – present

Sveriges mästerkock is a Swedish competitive reality television cooking show based on the original British version of MasterChef. The first episode aired on 12 January 2011 on TV4.

== Judges ==
The competition judges are:

Mischa Billing (2015–)
Tom Sjöstedt (2021-)
Tommy Myllymäki (2023-)
Former:
Markus Aujalay (2011– 2022)
Leif Mannerström (2011–2020)
Anders Dahlbom (2014)
Per Morberg (2011–2013)

== 1st season ==
=== Top 14 ===
| Contestant | Age | Occupation | Hometown | Episode of elimination | Place Finished |
|---|---|---|---|---|---|
| Louise Johansson | 24 | Administration and storage | Kungälv | Episode 15 | Winner |
| Jennie Benjaminsson | 18 | Chef | Lindome | Episode 15 | 2nd place |
| Ben Gandy | 21 | Rugby Player | Stockholm | Episode 14 | 3rd place |
| Åke Lithen | 51 | IT Support | Skellefteå | Episode 14 | 4th place |
| Jessica Frej | 21 | Student | Stockholm | Episode 13 | Eliminated 10th |
| Pernilla Elmquist | 47 | Journalist / writer / copywriter | Malmö | Episode 12 | Eliminated 9th |
| Björn Spak | 36 | Environmental Specialist | Mölndal | Episode 11 | Eliminated 8th |
| Johanna Orring | 27 | Private Consultant | Stockholm | Episode 10 | Eliminated 7th |
| Andreas Wennborg | 32 | Taxi driver | Helsingborg | Episode 9 | Eliminated 6th |
| Ingrid Persson | 34 | Student | Umeå | Episode 8 | Eliminated 5th |
| Linda Tjällberg | 37 | Self-employed | Sollefteå | Episode 8 | Eliminated 4th |
| Laleh Maghonaki | 43 | Consultant | Storvreta | Episode 7 | Eliminated 3rd |
| Maximilian Moëll | 20 | Student | Lund | Episode 6 | Eliminated 2nd |
| Leif Nöjd | 45 | Chemical-technological innovator | Åkersberga | Episode 5 | Eliminated 1st |

=== Elimination table ===
| Place | Contestant | Episode | | | | | | | | | | | | | | |
| Place | Contestant | 1-4 | | | | 5 | 6 | 7 | 8 | 9 | 10 | 11 | 12 | 13 | 14 | 15 |
|---|---|---|---|---|---|---|---|---|---|---|---|---|---|---|---|---|
| 1 | Louise | | IN | | | SAFE | | | | | | | | | | |
| 2 | Jennie | | | | IN | HIGH | | | | | | | | | | |
| 3-4 | Ben | IN | | | | SAFE | | | | | | | | | | |
| 3-4 | Ake | | | IN | | SAFE | | | | | | | | | | |
| 5 | Jessica | | IN | | | SAFE | | | | | | | | | | |
| 6 | Pernilla | IN | | | | WIN | | | | | | | | | | |
| 7 | Björn | | IN | | | SAFE | | | | | | | | | | |
| 8 | Johanna | | | | IN | WIN | | | | | | | | | | |
| 9 | Andreas | IN | | | | SAFE | | | | | | | | | | |
| 10 | Ingrid | | | IN | | BTM2 | | | | | | | | | | |
| 11 | Linda | | IN | | | HIGH | | | | | | | | | | |
| 12 | Laleh | IN | | | | SAFE | | | | | | | | | | |
| 13 | Maximilian | | | | IN | LOW | | | | | | | | | | |
| 14 | Leif | | | IN | | ELIM | | | | | | | | | | |
