= Özz Nûjen =

Swedish-Kurdish comedian, actor, TV host (born 1975)

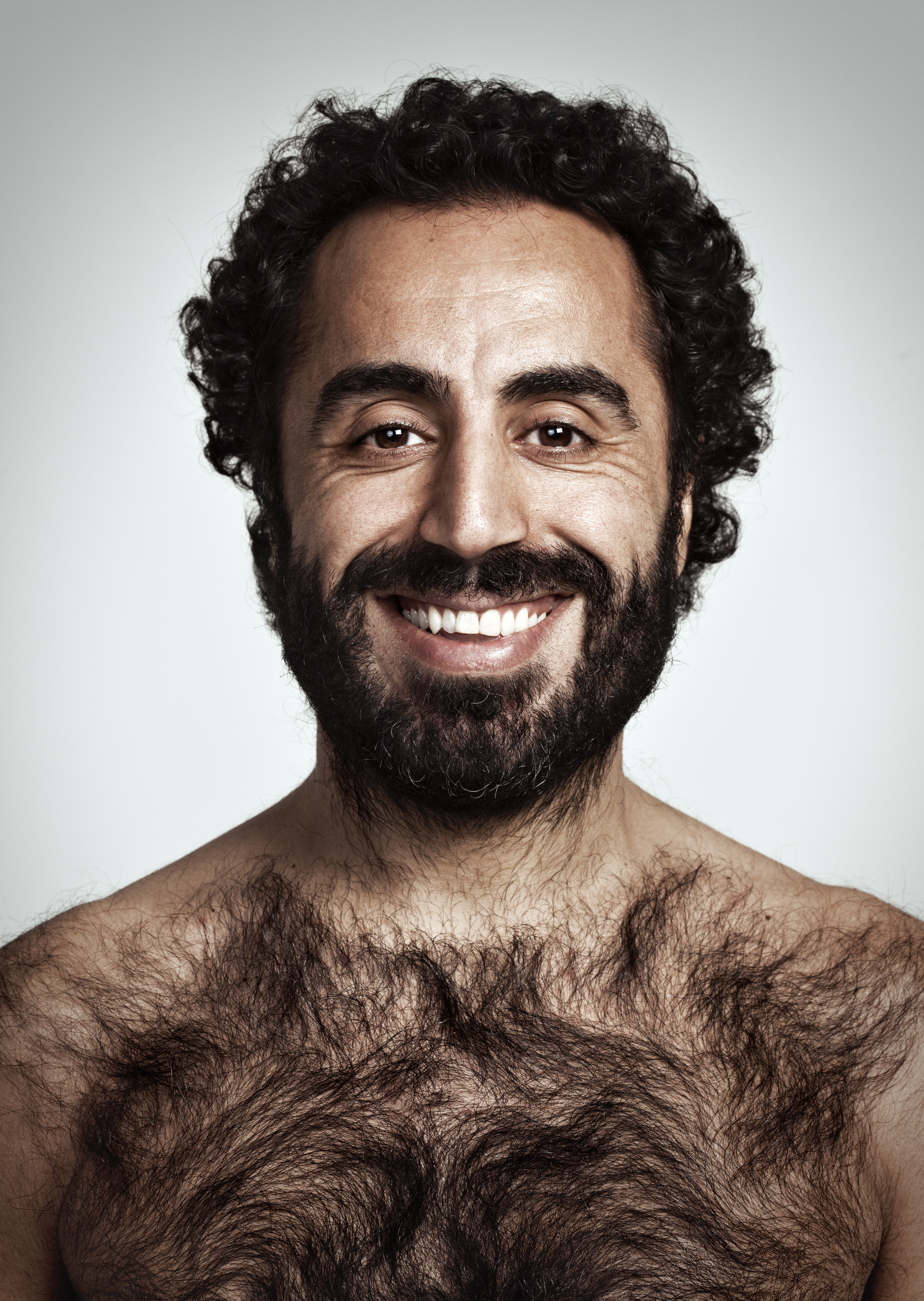
- Nûjen in 2014
- Born: Özgür Gegin; 20 June 1975 (age 50); Bismil, Turkey
- Occupations: Actor, Comedian
- Years active: 2004–present
- Spouse: Hanna Gillving (m. 2006; div. 2008)

Loren Özz Ceko Nûjen (born 20 June 1975) is a Turkey-born Kurdish-Swedish stand up comedian, scriptwriter, TV show host and actor who lives in Sweden. In 2014, Nûjen participated in Stjärnorna på slottet broadcast on SVT, where he told about his life and career. In 2015, Nûjen and Måns Möller comedy stage show "Sveriges Historia - den nakna sanningen" premiered at Rival.

== Filmography ==
- Dålig stämning (2013) – from his tour of his first solo standup show filmed at the Hotel Rival in Stockholm
- Özz Nûjen: Statsminister (2014) – concert telefilm
