= Nour El-Refai =

Swedish actress and comedian (born 1987)

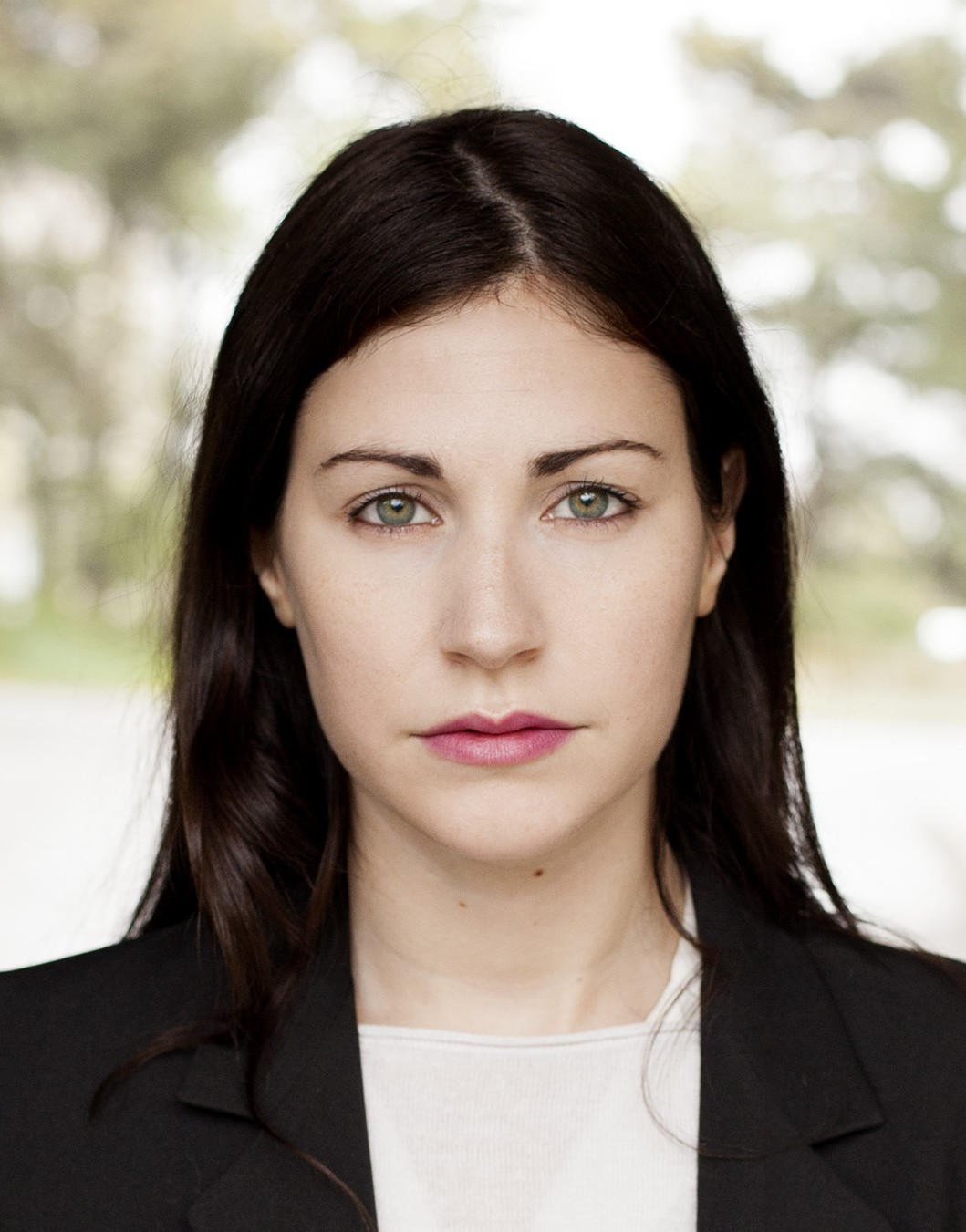
- El-Refai in 2014
- Born: 14 November 1987 (age 38); Tripoli, Lebanon
- Occupations: Television presenter, comedian, actress
- Children: 1
- Relatives: Al-Rifai family

Nour El Refai (born 14 November 1987) is a Swedish actress and comedian. She became known for her participation in the candid-camera show Raj Raj in 2007 and hosted Melodifestivalen 2014. El Refai has also appeared in several movies such as Kronjuvelerna and Johan Falk: Spelets regler.

== Early life ==
El Refai was born to Sunni Muslim parents in Tripoli, Lebanon during the country's civil war and her family moved to Sweden to live in Eslöv just a few months after her birth. Her family moved a few years later to Norra Fäladen in Lund. She grew up in a single parent family with her mother, as her father left after a divorce just weeks after the arrival of the El Refai family in Sweden. Nour has had no contact with her father since.

== Personal life ==
El Refai lives in Traneberg, Stockholm.

El Refai was the victim of a sexual assault just before the start of her television career. The man who assaulted her was later sentenced to four months imprisonment.

El Refai has dysthymia, a chronic form of depression. She has talked about her condition in two works: in her stand-up show En komisk depression ("A comical depression") in 2016–2017 and later in her late-2019 self-scripted and self-led four-part two-hour mini-documentary series "Livet lyckopiller" ("The happiness-pill life") which aired on Sveriges Television, Sweden's national public television channel, in November–December 2019. In the mini-documentary she talks about her depression and showcases her attempts to get help and improve it, meets other Swedes with depression, and seeks and tells statistics and scientific facts about depression, mainly in Sweden.

== Career ==
El Refai first came into prominence in 2006, when she had a role in the crime drama movie Beck – Det tysta skriket.

Along with Cecilia Forss she hosted the candid-camera show, Raj Raj, which was broadcast on TV400 during 2007. In one notorious segment, she flashed her breasts to a man in Humlegården, which is famed for male flashers, and she was reported to the police. Charges were pressed and later she was sentenced to pay a fine for indecent exposure. El Refai and Forss had cooperated previously in the TV3 humour show Hus i helvete.

In 2008, El Refai was assigned as a reporter on stage for the Melodifestivalen 2008; the Swedish national selection for the Eurovision Song Contest. She interviewed the singers after they went off stage following their performances. During the same year, she acted in the Morgonsoffan television show also on SVT. She acted in the Henrik Schyffert comedy show Sverige Pussas och Kramas on Kanal5.

Nour has also been a radio talk show host on Morgonpasset at Sveriges Radio P3. During 2009, El Refai acted as the character "Bitterfittan" (English: "The bitter cunt") on the comedy show, Ballar av stål, the Swedish version of Balls of Steel. She also took part in Wipeout as a contestant; both shows were broadcast on the Swedish Kanal 5.

In 2011, she appeared in the movie Kronjuvelerna, and in 2012 had a role in another movie, Johan Falk: Spelets regler.

During late 2009 she was one of the characters on the comedy show Cirkus Möller on TV4. During 2010, she was on stage with a Swedish production of Grease at Göta Lejon in Stockholm. In late 2010, she worked again as a radio talk show host, and was part of the show's special, where stars including El Refai were locked inside a glass house for a whole week to raise money for Musikhjälpen on Sveriges Radio.

El Refai hosted Melodifestivalen 2014, along with Anders Jansson.

Since 2021, she has been participating in Masked Singer Sverige.

== Filmography ==
- 2004 – Generation Y
- 2005 – Vem är du?—as Åsa (feature film)
- 2006 – Beck – Det tysta skriket (TV film)
- 2006 – Elvismackan (short film)
- 2006 – Frostbiten—as Cornelia (feature film)
- 2006 – När mörkret faller (feature film)
- 2009-2010: Ballar av stål as Bitterfittan (TV series – 10 episodes)
- 2010 – Välkommen åter (TV series)
- 2010 – Wallander – Dödsängeln (feature film)
- 2011 – Kronjuvelerna (feature film)
- 2011 – Stockholm – Båstad (TV mini-series, 1 episode as Sharon)
- 2012 – Johan Falk: Spelets regler as Lovisa (feature film to video)
- 2012 – Labyrint (TV series)
- 2014 – Sköterskan: The Nurse as The Nurse (short film)
- 2014 – Melodifestivalen 2014 (TV series)
- 2018 – Bonus Family (TV series)
- 2023 – Trolltider – legenden om bergatrollet as Mara (TV series)
- 2024 – Bäst i test (TV series)
- 2026 – V/H/S/Mixtape (feature film, segment Premature Burial)
