= Ola Forssmed =

Swedish comedian and actor

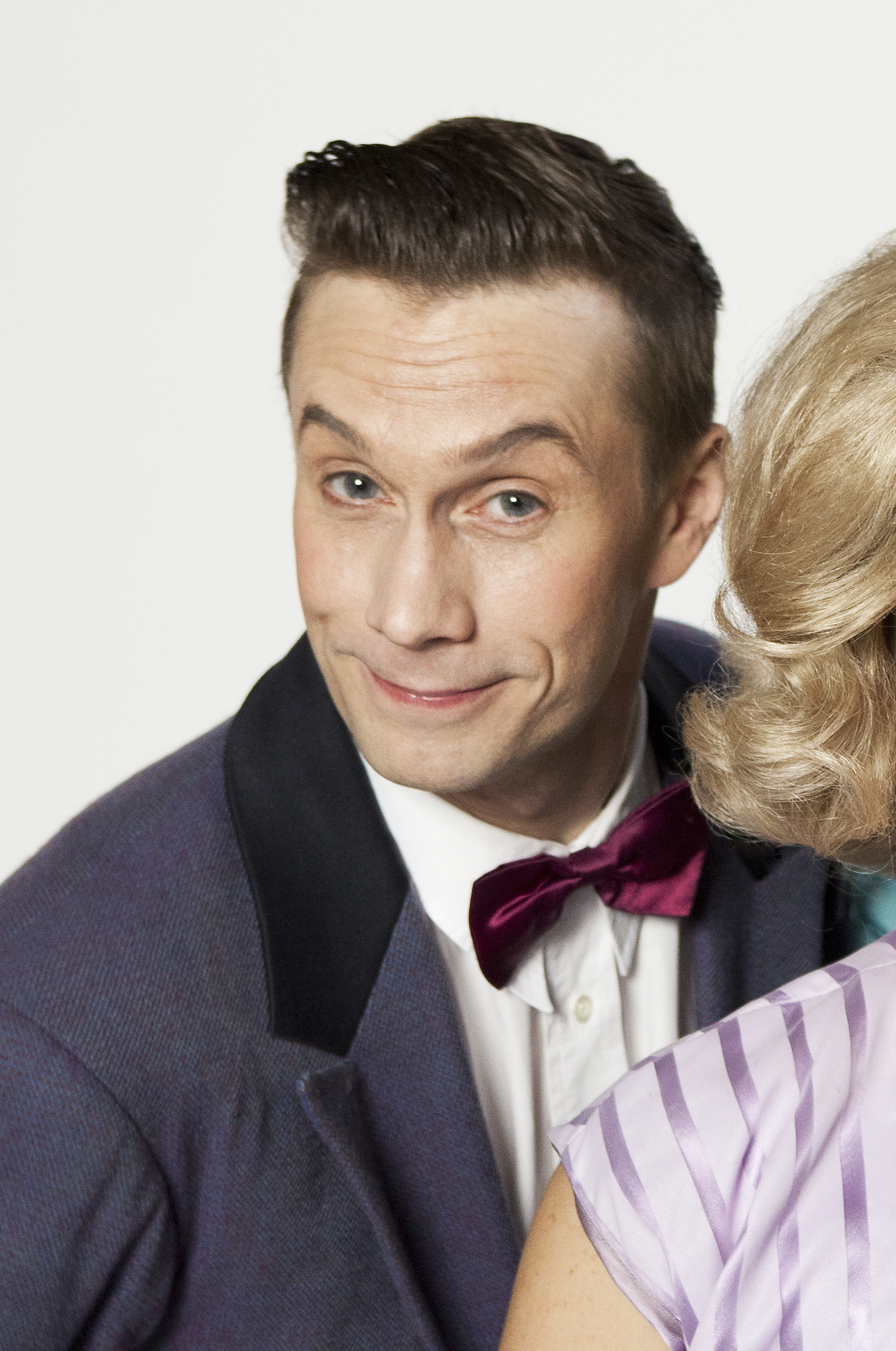
- Ola Forssmed in 2013
- Born: Ola Martin Forssmed; 6 September 1973 (age 52); Växjö, Sweden
- Relatives: Jakob Forssmed (second cousin)

Ola Martin Forssmed (born 6 September 1973) is a Swedish comedian and actor.

== Biography ==
Forssmeds career started in 1996 when he acted in the role as gay hairdresser Micki in the SVT series "Rederiet", staying on the series until its conclusion in 2002. Forssmeds character Micki became the first character on Swedish television to give another man a kiss between two homosexual men, which received attention at the time of broadcast.

He has also acted in several theater productions such as "The Buddy Holly Story", "Karlsson på taket", "Wizard of Oz", "Grease" och "Beauty and the beast" at Göta Lejon in Stockholm. He also acted as one of the policemen in the Chinateatern production of "Pippi Longstocking", as well as "Linje Lusta" at Stockholms stadsteater.

In 2007, Forssmed played the part of Groucho Marx in the production of "Den stora premiären" at Fredriksdalsteatern.

Between 2008 and 2009, he played the role of Carmen Ghia in the production of The Producers - Det våras för Hitler at Chinateatern. In 2010, he played in the production of "Vita Hästen" at Gunnebo House theater.

Between 2018 and 2019, Forssmed acted in the Pernilla Wahlgren comedic stage show celebrating 40-years as a singer and actress, called Kort, glad och tacksam (Short, Happy and Grateful). He also participated in the second stage show, a continuation of Kort, glad och tacksam, called Pernilla Wahlgren har Hybris (Pernilla Wahlgren Got Hubris), wrote and directed by Edward af Sillén, which premiered in 2020.

Ola Forssmed have two children along with his ex-wife Martina Beer.
