= Babben Larsson =

Swedish actress and comedian

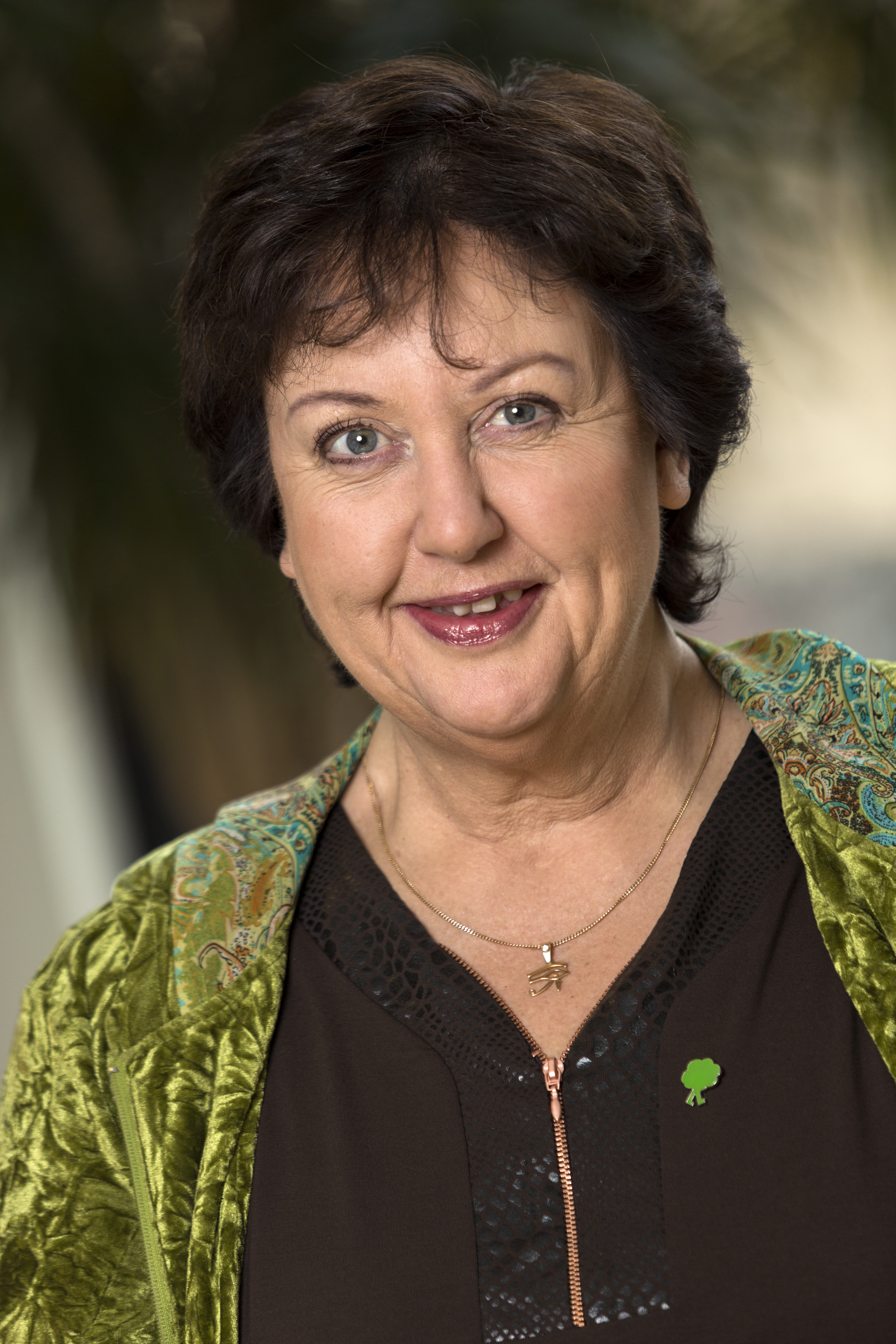
- Babben Larsson in November 2014
- Born: Barbro Karin Viola Westerlund Larsson; 29 October 1956 (age 69); Dalhem, Gotland, Sweden
- Occupations: Actress; comedian; television personality; singer
- Years active: 1980–present
- Style: Stand-up comedy
- Website: www.babben.com

Barbro Karin Viola Westerlund Larsson (born 29 October 1956), known as simply Babben Larsson, is a Swedish actress, comedian, television personality and singer.

== Life and career ==
Babben was born in Dalhem on Gotland and is recognised by her pronounced Gotlandic dialect. Now living in Solna with her daughter, she attended the National Academy of Dramatic Art in Stockholm in 1977–1980. She has been active in the S.U.C.K. (Stand Up Comedy Club) since 1988 and comedian group R.E.A. (Roligt Elakt Aktuellt). She has also appeared in the TV show Parlamentet and had her own talk show Babben & co in 2007. She performed as a stand-up comedian in Great Britain 1996 and also did a couple of appearances on British television.

In 1992, Swedish astronomer Claes-Ingvar Lagerkvist named one of the asteroids in the asteroid belt, 10795 Babben after her.

In 2006, she was voted the most popular female comedian in Sweden in the popular TV-programme Folktoppen.

Since 2017, Larsson has hosted Bäst i test, the Swedish version of Taskmaster, together with David Sundin. The program was initially broadcast on SVT, the Swedish national public TV broadcaster, but due to an increase in format licensing fees was moved to TV4 in 2023.

== Selected filmography ==
Appearances in films and television series.

- 1980 – Children's Island
- 1984 – Tryggare kan ingen vara … (TV series)
- 1989 – Peter och Petra
- 1994 – Läckan
- 1994 – 13-årsdagen
- 1996 – Drömprinsen – filmen om Em
- 1996 – Polisen och pyromanen (TV series)
- 1997 – Nattbuss 807
- 1998 – Lithivm
- 1999 – Sherdil
- 2007 – Leende guldbruna ögon (TV series)
- 2010 – Fyra år till
- 2013 – Wallander – försvunnen
- 2014 – LasseMajas detektivbyrå – Skuggor över Valleby
- 2017 – Bäst i test
- 2020 – Mirakel
