= Ann Westin =

Swedish comedian

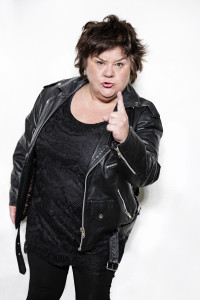
- Westin in 2012.
- Born: 15 February 1956 (age 70); Gothenburg, Sweden
- Occupation: Comedian

Ann Westin (born 15 February 1956) is a Swedish comedian. She previously worked as a psychiatric nurse and nurse. She made her debut as a comedian at Norra brunn in 1996. She was awarded Bubbenpriset in 2001. She has participated in several television shows such as Stockholm Live and Cirkus Möller. In 2014, she toured with her solo performance Jobbit.

She has also ventured in to acting with a role in the Fjällbackamorden films, and the film ”Dancing Queens”
