= Kay Glans =

Swedish poet, essayist, publisher and literary critic

Kay Standy Glans (born 17 October 1955 in Finja, Kristianstad County, Sweden) is a Swedish poet, essayist, publisher and literary critic. Glans has contributed to a number of anthologies, mainly on political subjects. He has also published two collections of poems: Människans art (1980) and Från den norra provinsen (1986).

Glans was the executive editor of the magazine Axess from its founding in 2002 until he resigned in 2006. He has also worked as editor of the featured article-page Under strecket in Svenska Dagbladet and served on the editorial board of the magazine Moderna tider.

Glans was awarded the Carl Emil Englund Award (Swedish: Carl Emil Englund-priset) in 1987.

In the years 2012–2021, he was editor-in-chief of the journal Respons, which, in addition to reviews of Swedish non-fiction, contains essays, debate articles, interviews and reportage.

On 29 January 2016 Glans received an honorary doctorate from the Faculty of Social Sciences at Uppsala University.

== Selected bibliography ==
- Glans, Kay (1980). Människans art : dikter (in Swedish). Stockholm: Bonnier. ISBN 91-0-044776-5.
- Glans, Kay (1986). Från den norra provinsen : dikter (in Swedish). Stockholm: Bonnier. ISBN 91-0-046930-0.
