= Snacka om nyheter =

Swedish television series

- The titlescreen
- Genre: Panel game
- Presented by: Stellan Sundahl (1995-1999); Sven Melander (2000-2003); Kajsa Ingmarsson (2008-2009)
- Country of origin: Sweden
- Original language: Swedish
- No. of seasons: 14
- No. of episodes: 90

Production
- Producers: SVT Malmö (1995-2003); Jarowskij (2008-2009)
- Production locations: Malmö (1995-2003); Stockholm (2008-2009)
- Running time: 28-29 minutes

Original release
- Network: SVT2 (1995-2000); SVT1 (2001-2003); Kanal 9 (2008-2009)
- Release: 5 March 1995 – 21 December 2003

Snacka om nyheter was the Swedish version of the BBC series Have I Got News for You, broadcast by Sveriges Television. It was first broadcast on 5 March 1995 on TV2 and hosted by Stellan Sundahl. On 22 February 1999 Stellan Sundahl died, days after taping an episode that was shown the day before he died. The show was put on hiatus and the three remaining episodes were replaced by commemorative programmes.

The show returned in November 2000 and was hosted by Sven Melander who would continue hosting it until the show's cancellation. The last programme was broadcast on 21 December 2003.

Snacka om nyheter took many rounds from the British original, including the "Film Round", "Tabloid Headlines", "Odd One Out", "Missing Words" and "Caption Competition". Other elements borrowed from Have I Got News for You were the opening that included the phrase "Good evening and welcome to Snacka om nyheter" followed by a punch-line and the three "news reports" in the beginning as well as the humorous delivery of the scores.

In 2008, the show began airing again, this time on Kanal 9, hosted by Kajsa Ingmarsson and produced by Jarowskij. This only lasted two seasons and the show was canceled in the spring of 2009.
