= Annika Andersson =

Swedish comedian (born 1968)

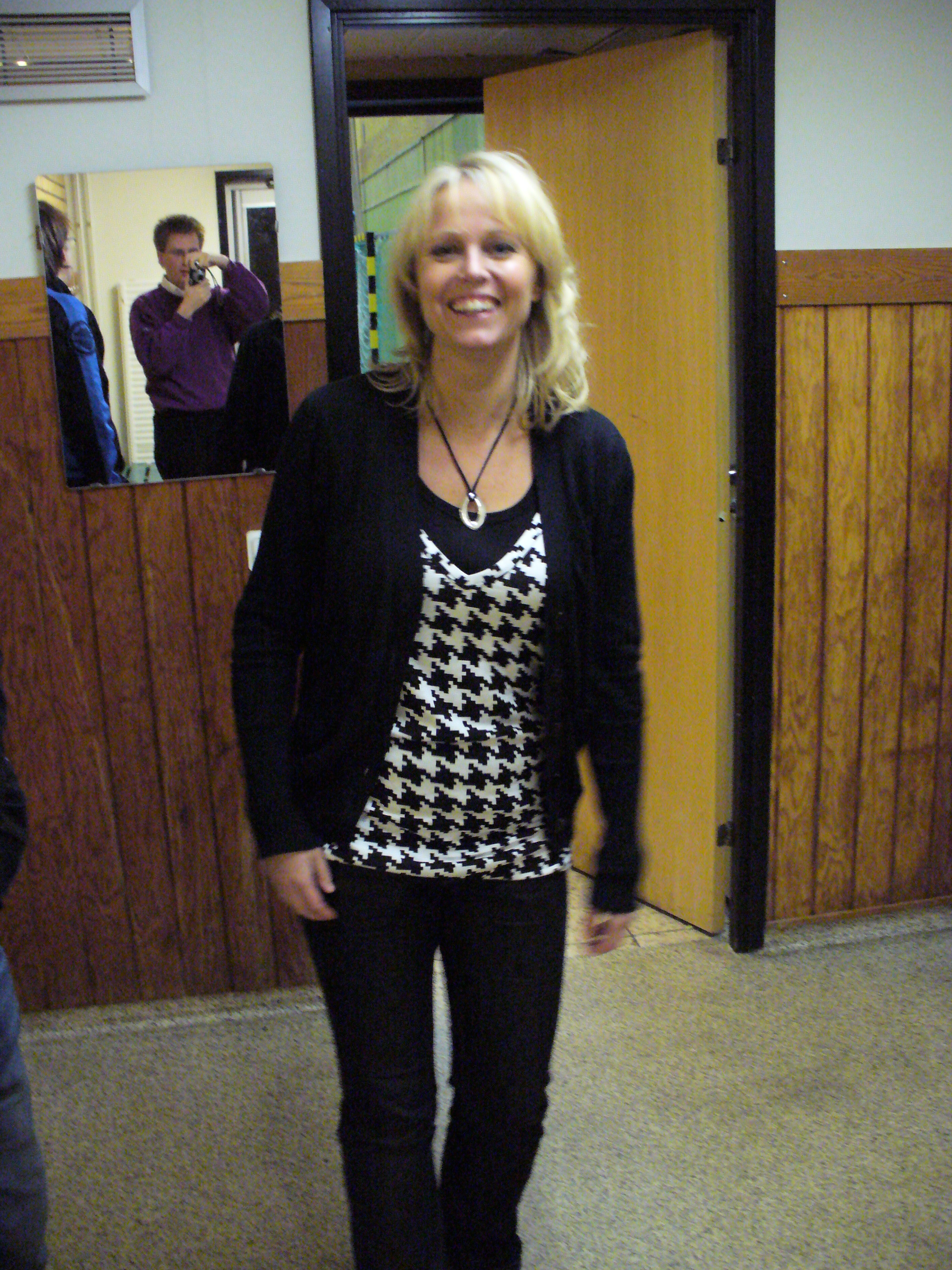
- Annika Andersson in 2006
- Born: Kerstin Annika Andersson; 8 May 1968 (age 58); Mårdaklev, Sweden
- Occupations: Comedian; actress
- Spouse: Tomas Korenado
- Children: 4

Kerstin Annika Andersson (born 8 May 1968) is a Swedish actress and comedian. She started with roles in farces at the Vallarnas friluftsteater, later having a career in both television and film as well.

== Biography ==
=== Early life ===
Kerstin Annika Andersson was born on 8 May 1968 in Mårdaklev, Sweden.

In 1987, she started working at the reception desk at the camping at Gekås. Later starting working at the ladies department of the store. In 1986, Andersson made her stage debut when her father Tore Wallnedal did a New Years revue in her hometown of Mårdaklev.

=== Career ===
Her career started in 1996, when she got the role as Bettan Olsson in the farce Hemlighuset at Vallarnas friluftsteater in Falkenberg. In 1997, she return to the same theater in the farce Hemvärn & påssjuka in the role as Greta Kristersson. She has also acted in television, in the 1999 comedy series Full Frys, in the 2005 comedy series Hon och Hannes, both on TV4. As well as acting in films like The Stig-Helmer Story in 2011 and Svart kung a film released in 2014.

She participated in the 2019 season of Bäst i test, which was broadcast on TV4.

In 2006, Andersson was part of the R.E.A comedy show at Hamburger Börs in Stockholm. In 2007, Andersson in the show Otroligt het! at the Lisebergsteatern in Gothenburg. Between 2003 and 2012, she was a full time panel member on the TV4 sports comedy show Time out.

In 2017, Andersson played Marika in the TV4 series Enkelstöten. And in 2020 she had a leading role in the SVT series "Falkenberg forever".

She has won the Guldmasken, awarded for private theatre productions, twice: as best actor in 2001 for Dagens dubbel and best supporting actress in 2000 for Inte nu älskling.

== Personal life ==
Andersson, who lives in Falkenberg, has one daughter and three sons with her husband Tomas Korenado.
