= Johan Glans =

Swedish comedian and actor

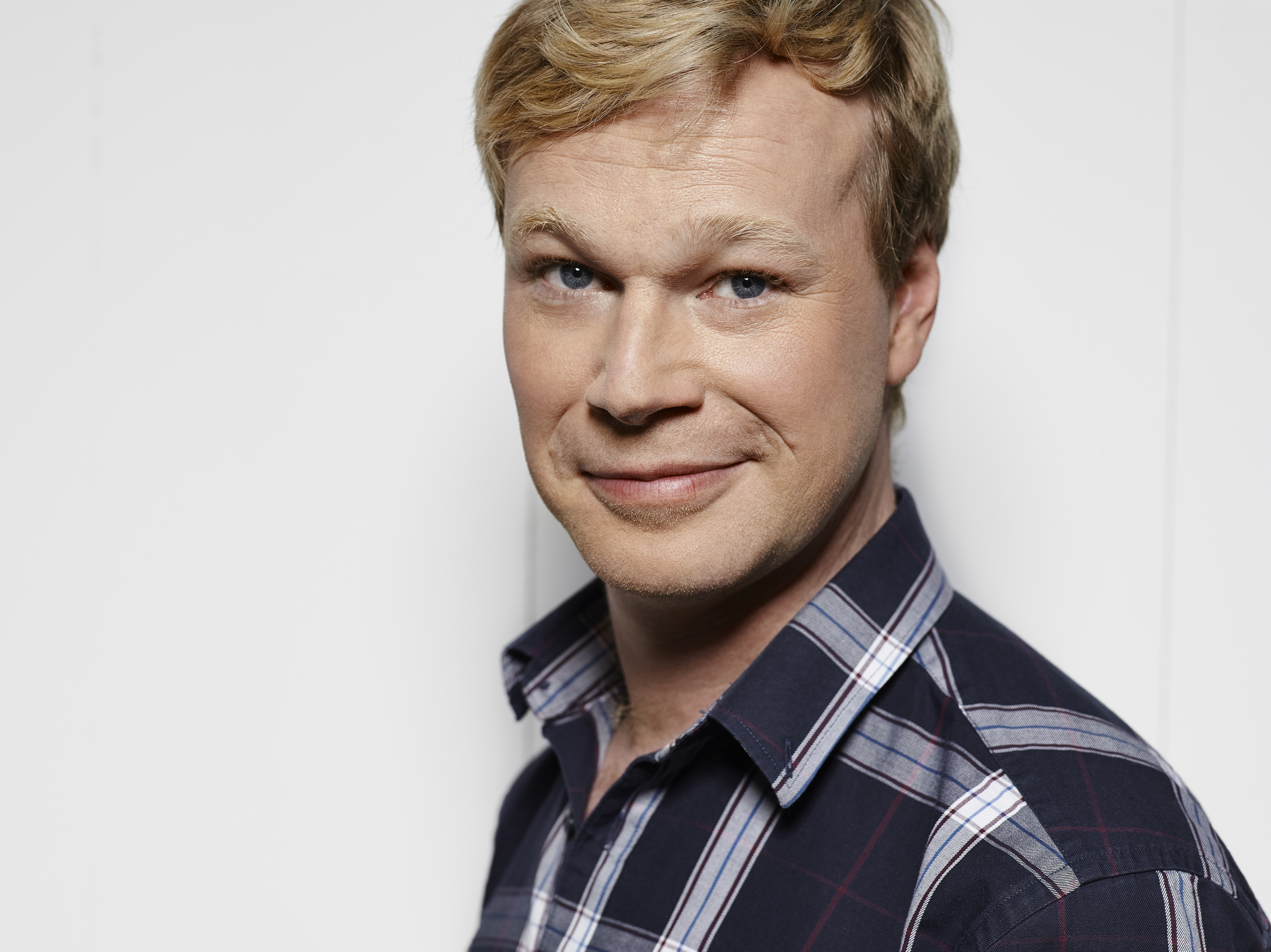
- Glans in 2014
- Born: Johan Magnus Glans; 9 April 1974 (age 51); Eslöv, Sweden
- Occupations: Actor, comedian
- Years active: 1994-
- Partner: Sara Young
- Website: https://www.johanglans.se/

Johan Magnus Glans (born 9 April 1974 in Eslöv, Sweden) is a Swedish stand up comedian and actor. He started doing stand up comedy in 1994, and has worked on Swedish TV with David Batra. Since 2016, Johan Glans has starred as Axel in Swedish Dicks on Pop. In the spring of 2016, Johan Glans participated as team leader in SVT's new comedy program "Tror du jag ljuger?" together with Anna Mannheimer as program manager and Fredrik Lindström as team manager for the opposing team. All three have appeared in the same roles in later seasons. In 2018, he was awarded the Pirate Prize. He has a role in the 2020, Christmas calendar Mirakel, which is broadcast on SVT.

Glans is married to Sara Young and together they have two children. Glans' uncle is the author and culture writer Kay Glans. Glans is a cousin of the track and field athlete Dan Glans.

In 2021, Glans is starring in Home Invasion on Netflix.
