= Emma Knyckare =

Comedian and radio host

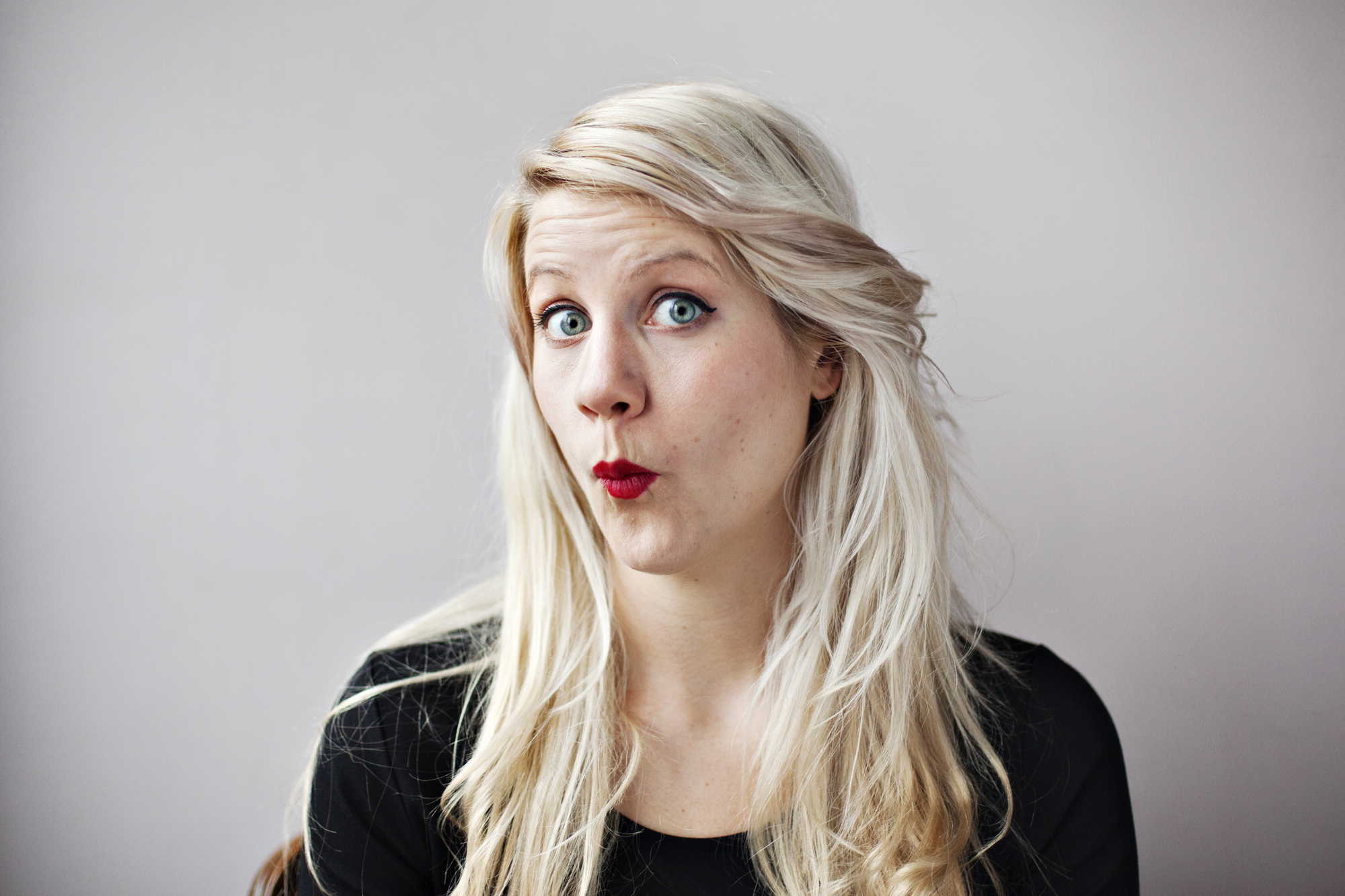
- Born: Emma Andersson; 14 July 1987 (age 38); Varberg, Sweden
- Other name: Emma Knyckare
- Occupations: Comedian, radio host

Emma Margareta Knyckare (born Andersson, 14 July 1987) is a Swedish comedian and radio presenter. Knyckare has hosted the radio shows Morgonpasset, Tankesmedjan and her own radio show Knyckare i P3. She was also one of the hosts for the radio and television charity show Musikhjälpen in December 2013.

== Career ==
Knyckare was born in the village of Rolfstorp in Halland. Knyckare has worked on several Sveriges Radio P3 shows such as Morgonpasset and Tankesmedjan. She is one of the main hosts of the show Tankesmedjan and co-host of Morgonpasset. In 2013, Knyckare was locked inside a glass house in Gothenburg for an entire week along with Sarah Dawn Finer and Kodjo Akolor to host the radio and television aid charity show Musikhjälpen (Music aid) which was broadcast on P3 and on SVT and SVT Play.

Knyckare has hosted Morgonpasset during the summer (June to August) for three years in a row. In December 2013, Knyckare hosted a comedy show on the Sagateatern along with comedian Simon Svensson.

After her work at Musikhjälpen, it was revealed that she would get her own radio show on Sveriges Radio P3 called Knyckare i P3 that will be broadcast five days a week starting 4 January 2014. She subsequently announced she would be leaving her job at P3 hosting Tankesmedjan.

Knyckare has also taken part in the comedy television show Telefonpiraterna (The telephone pirates) on Kanal5 and in Extra! Extra! on TV3. She also works as a stand-up comedian at clubs such as Raw Comedy Club, Bajsnödigt and Oslipat, participates in the podcast Åtties Mutant Ninja Komiker! along with Johannes Finnlaugsson, Nils Lind and Filip Andersson, and writes a column for the magazine ETC Göteborg.

In 2017, she received international attention after organizing a "man free" music festival only for women. She coined the idea after several sexual assault against women during festivals around Sweden.

Since 2020, she is one of the presenters and producers of the podcast Flashback forever along with Ina Lundström.
