= Måns Möller =

Swedish comedian and television presenter

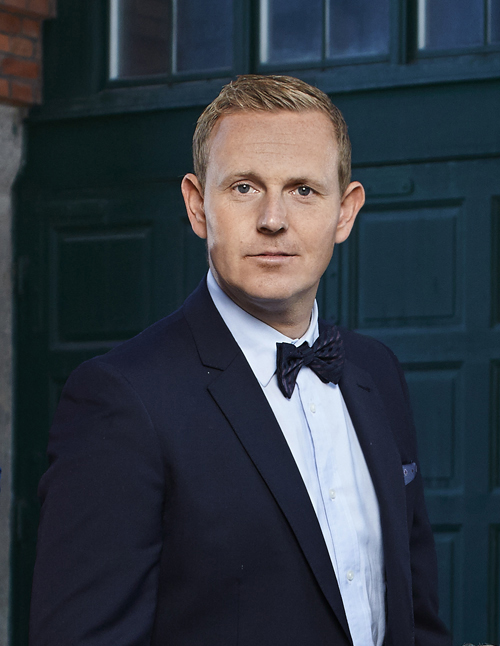
- Möller in 2014
- Born: Måns Gustav Möller; 21 March 1961 (age 65); Hässelby, Sweden
- Occupations: Television presenter, comedian

Måns Gustav Möller (born 27 January 1975) is a Swedish comedian and television presenter. He has presented the comedic panel show Extra! Extra! on TV3, and the comedy show Cirkus Möller and have been a travel reporter for När & Fjärran both on TV4.

In 2015, Möller and Özz Nûjen comedy stage show "Sveriges Historia - den nakna sanningen" premiered at Rival. In 2024, his comedy stage show ”Mitt perfekta liv” premiered in Stockholm.
