= Kodjo Akolor =

Swedish TV, radio personality, comedian

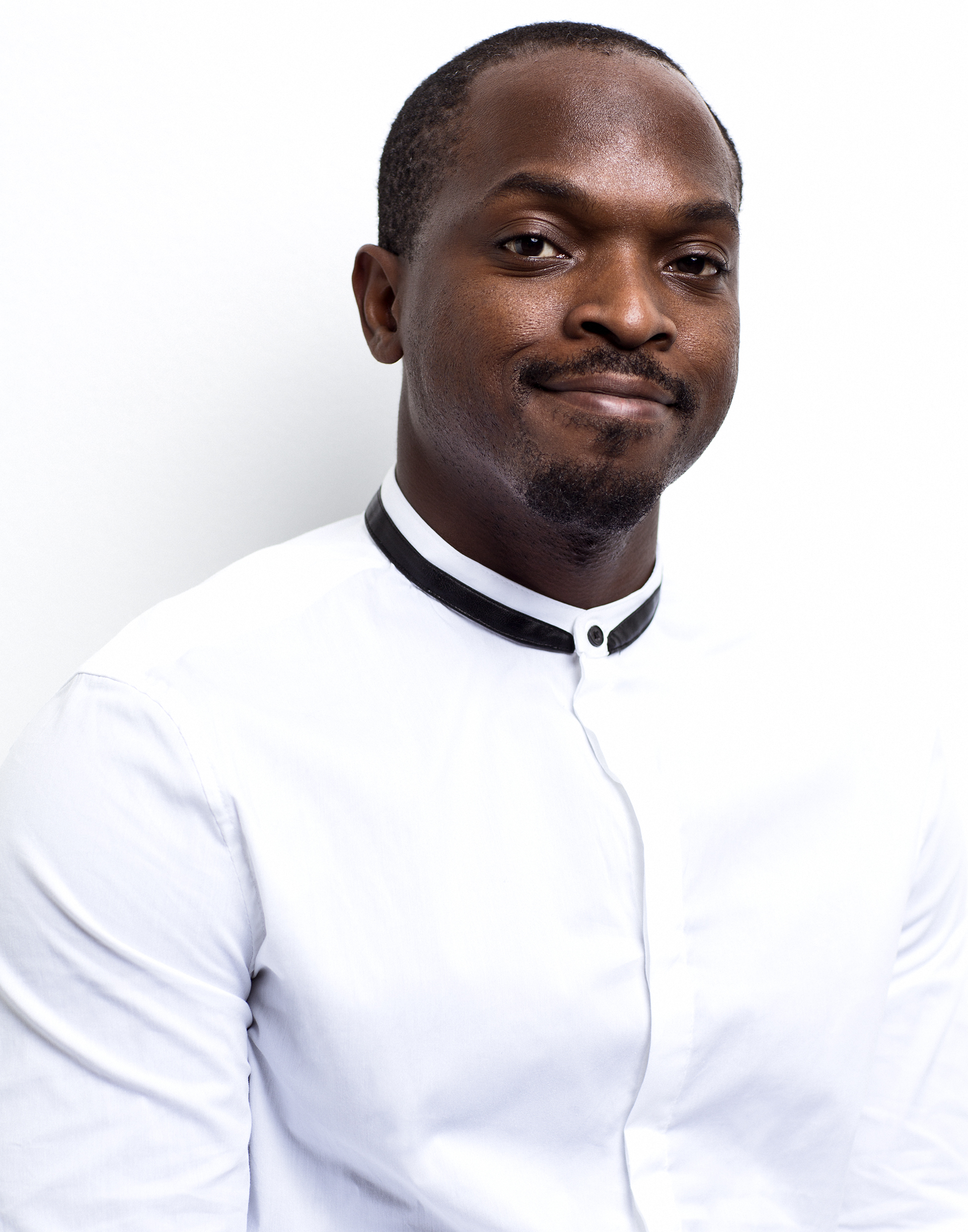
- Akolor in 2014.
- Born: Kodjo Akolor; 15 June 1981 (age 44); Vallentuna, Stockholm, Sweden
- Occupations: Comedian and television personality
- Years active: 2005–present
- Spouse: Olga Nikrasova Akolor (m. 2013)

Kodjo Akolor (born 15 June 1981) is a Swedish TV/radio personality and comedian.

== Career ==
He started as a comedian in 2005 and after two years became a regular on contemporary R&B themed radio station The Voice. In 2008 Akolor became a reporter for Vakna med the voice a TV and radio show multi-cast on TV-channel Kanal 5 and The Voice radio network. He also hosted the TV-show Kodjos värld (Kodjos world) on The Voice TV where he combined humor and music videos.

During the 2008 spring, he became the co-host of Talang (Talent) the Swedish version of the Got Talent series. The producers originally contacted comedian Björn Gustafsson, but his schedule was too busy and recommended his friend Kodjo Akolor.

Since 2008, he has also been one of the three regular show hosts on Radio P3's popular morning show Morgonpasset. He is frequently featured on Kanal 5's RAW comedy club and high-profile comedy show Parlamentet.

In the summer of 2010, Akolor was the host and MC at the largest Twilight Saga fan event in Scandinavia (at the Ericsson Globe Arena) featuring Taylor Lautner and Kristen Stewart. Kodjo has also been part of the Musikhjälpen several times.

In the spring of 2012, he co-hosted a Game of Thrones discussion show on SVT.

In 2014, he was voted the Best Male Host of the year at the Swedish Radio Awards. In 2015 he was inducted into the Stockholm Hall of Fame

On 26 October 2018, SVT announced that Akolor will host all six shows of Melodifestivalen 2019 alongside Eric Saade, Marika Carlsson and Sarah Dawn Finer.

== Personal life ==
Both of Kodjo Akolor's parents were born in Ghana and moved to Sweden in the 1970s thanks to his father getting a scholarship to study business. He says his family were the only black family in Vallentuna when he grew up. It was not until high school that he met others with a similar background. He has a university degree in Economics from Södertörns Högskola and lists medieval history as one of his hobbies.
