= Marika Carlsson =

Swedish comedian

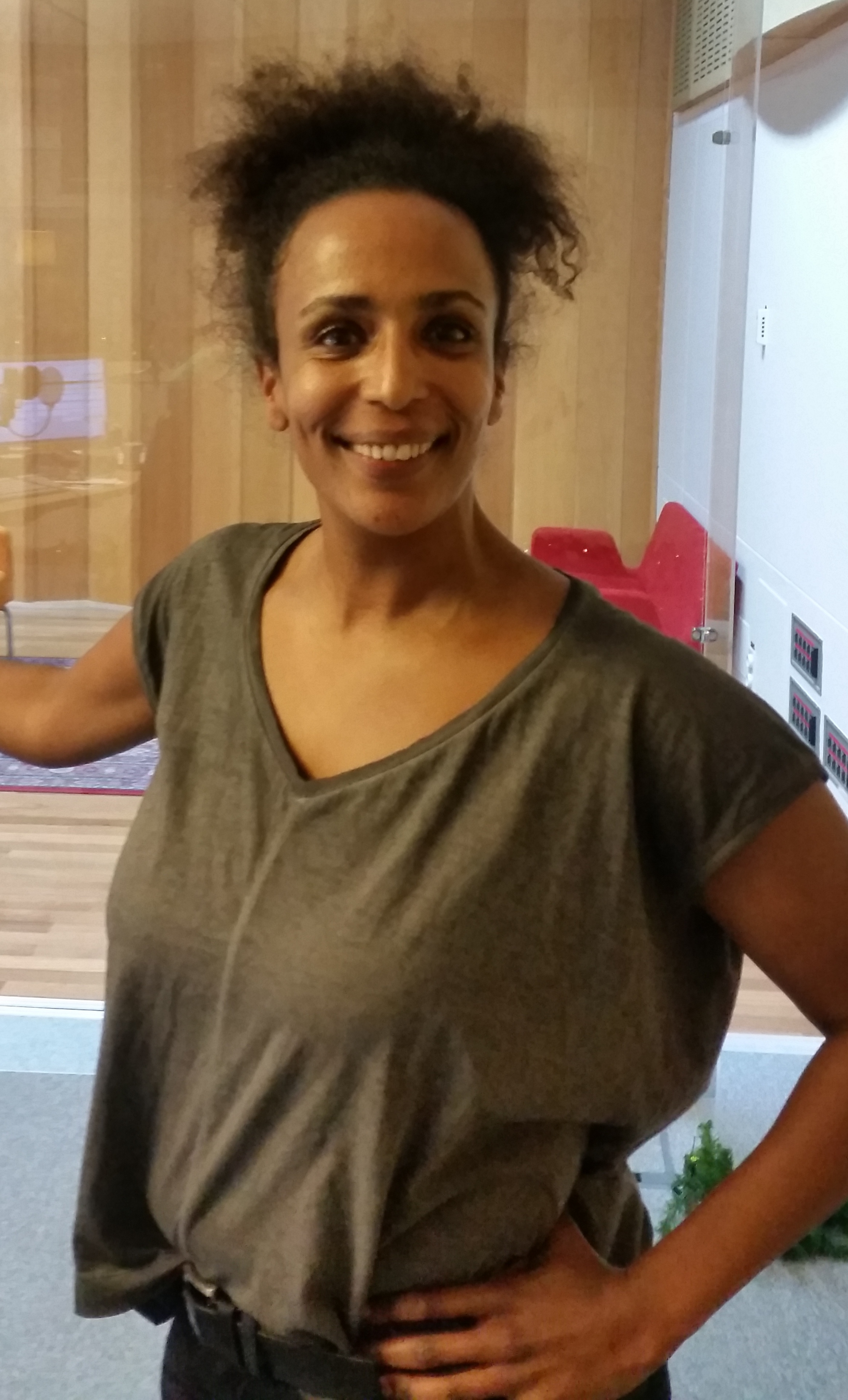
- Carlson in 2015
- Born: Marika Aychesh Carlsson; 19 March 1973 (age 53); Ethiopia

Comedy career
- Years active: 2006–present

Marika Aychesh Carlsson (born 19 March 1973) is a Swedish standup comedian and television presenter.

== Background ==
Carlsson was born in Ethiopia and was adopted by a Swedish couple at age two. She grew up in the town of Lund in Sweden's Skåne province. Carlsson studied theatre and acting in Gothenburg before moving to Stockholm to break into the standup comedy circuit.

In 2006, she was awarded the prize for best female standup comedian at the annual Swedish comedy awards.

== Television ==
She is probably best known from the popular panel game show Parlamentet on TV4, which parodies Swedish political debate. Carlsson has also featured in other TV shows such as, Stockholm Live, 100%, Carin 21.30, Grillad, Comedy fight Club Roast på Berns, Kvällsöppet, and as the host for SVT's televised coverage of the 2010 National Day of Sweden.

In 2019 Carlsson hosted Melodifestivalen 2019 alongside Eric Saade, Sarah Dawn Finer and Kodjo Akolor.
