= Anders Johansson (comedian) =

Swedish actor (born 1974)

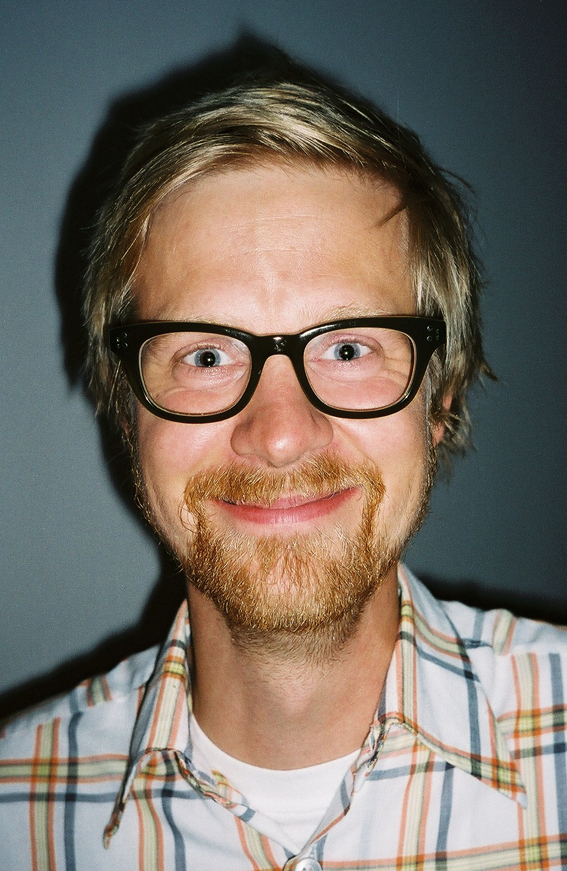
- Anders Johansson in 2008
- Born: 4 May 1974 (age 52); Linköping
- Occupation: Actor

Anders Mattias Roland "Ankan" Johansson (born 4 May 1974) is a Swedish comedian, television and radio presenter. He has presented Djursjukhuset, Fiska med Anders and Succéduon med Anders och Måns all broadcast in SVT. On Sveriges Radio he has presented Morgonpasset, Starkt material, Så funkar det and Wallraff.

== Radio shows ==
- 1998–2000 – Wallraff
- 2001–2003 – Så funkar det

== Filmography ==
- 2002–2003 – Anders & Måns (TV-series)
- 2006 – Fråga Anders & Måns (TV-series)
- 2008 – Skägget i brevlådan (TV-series)
- 2008 – Djursjukhuset (TV-series)
- 2010 – Anders och Måns (TV-series)
- 2012 – Fiska med Anders (TV-series)
- 2014 – Stjärnhoppningen (TV-series)
- 2014 – Fiska med Anders (TV-series)
- 2016 – Skolan (TV-series)
- 2017 – Parlamentet (TV-series)
- 2018 – På spåret (TV-series)
- 2018–2020 – Parlamentet (TV-series)
- 2019 – Släng dig i brunnen (TV-series)
- 2020 – Bäst i test (TV-series)
- 2020 – Se upp för Jönssonligan – Vanheden
