= Bonus Family =

Swedish drama television series

- Also known as: Bonusfamiljen

Original release
- Network: Netflix

Bonus Family (Swedish: Bonusfamiljen) is a Swedish drama series created by Felix Herngren, Moa Herngren, Clara Herngren, and Calle Marthin for SVT. The series debuted in 2017, with a second season in 2018. A third season of the series launched on both SVT and Netflix in 2019. The series won a Kristallen award in 2017 for "Best TV-drama". SVT announced that it has ordered a fourth season. Season 4 began streaming on Netflix on 14 December. On December 15, 2021, it was reported that shooting had begun on a Bonus Family film, Länge leve Bonusfamiljen, to be released in December 2022.

== Synopsis ==
Lisa (Vera Vitali) and Patrik (Erik Johansson), a couple in their 30s living in Stockholm, are each recently divorced; both have 10-year-old sons, and Lisa has a teenage daughter. Patrik's ex-wife Katja (Petra Mede) is an architect, and Lisa's ex-husband Martin (Fredrik Hallgren) works at a bed retailer. The series follows the turbulent relationships between the new couple and their exes, as well as the three kids' adjustments to their new family situation and how Patrik deals with the contrast between his quiet, diligent son William (Jacob Lundquist) and Lisa's troublesome, adventurous son Eddie (Frank Dorsin).

== Cast and characters ==
=== Main ===
- Vera Vitali as Lisa Johansson: Martin's ex-wife. Version française. Nathalie Bienaimé.
- Erik Johansson as Patrik Ahlin: a school teacher, Katja's ex-husband
- Petra Mede (series 1‒3) / Emma Peters (pilot + series 4) as Katja Rosén; architect, Patrik's ex-wife
- Fredrik Hallgren as Martin Johansson: a sales clerk, Lisa's ex-husband
- Frank Dorsin as Eddie Johansson: Lisa and Martin's 10-year-old son
- Amanda Lindh as Bianca Johansson: Lisa and Martin's 15-year-old daughter
- Jacob Lundqvist as William Ahlin: Patrik and Katja's 10-year-old son

=== Recurring ===
- Marianne Mörck as Birgitta ("Bigge"): Martin's mother
- Christer Lindarw as Danny, co-worker of Martin
- Barbro Svensson as Gunvor ("Gugge"): Birgitta's girlfriend
- Ann Petrén as Ylva: Lisa and Patrik's marriage co-counselor
- Johan Ulveson as Jan: Lisa and Patrik's other marriage co-counselor
- Martin Luuk as Filip Kron: a school counsellor at Patrik's school, Patrik's friend and confidant.
- Leo Razzak as Sebastian ("Sebbe"): Martin's co-worker at a mattress store.
- Felix Engström as Micael Schmidt: Katja's boss and sexual harasser/former love interest.
- Niklas Engdahl as Henrik Hörstadius: Katja's co-worker and boyfriend.
- Ida Engvoll as Therese ("Tessan"): a clothing store worker at the same shopping centre as Martin's mattress store and briefly Martin's girlfriend.
- Dakota Trancher Williams as Matteo: Bianca's boyfriend
- Dragomir Mrsic as Branco: Martial arts teacher and Katja's boyfriend (season 2)
- Regina Lund as Emma: Lisa's sister
- Nour El Refai as Sima, Martin's domestic partner
- Hanna Dorsin as Tuula, a midwife

== Episodes ==
Season	Episodes	Originally released	
Season	Episodes	First released	Last released
1	10	January 30, 2017	April 3, 2017
2	10	January 29, 2018	April 2, 2018
3	10	February 18, 2019	April 29, 2019
4	8	October 25, 2021	December 13, 2021

=== Season 1 (2017) ===
No.	Title	Directed by	Written by	Original release date
1	"Episode 1"	Unknown	Unknown	January 30, 2017
2	"Episode 2"	Unknown	Unknown	February 6, 2017
3	"Episode 3"	Unknown	Unknown	February 13, 2017
4	"Episode 4"	Unknown	Unknown	February 20, 2017
5	"Episode 5"	Unknown	Unknown	February 27, 2017
6	"Episode 6"	Unknown	Unknown	March 6, 2017
7	"Episode 7"	Unknown	Unknown	March 13, 2017
8	"Episode 8"	Unknown	Unknown	March 20, 2017
9	"Episode 9"	Unknown	Unknown	March 27, 2017
10	"Episode 10"	Unknown	Unknown	April 3, 2017

=== Season 2 (2018) ===
No.	Title	Directed by	Written by	Original release date
1	"Episode 1"	Unknown	Unknown	January 29, 2018
2	"Episode 2"	Unknown	Unknown	February 5, 2018
3	"Episode 3"	Unknown	Unknown	February 12, 2018
4	"Episode 4"	Unknown	Unknown	February 19, 2018
5	"Episode 5"	Unknown	Unknown	February 26, 2018
6	"Episode 6"	Unknown	Unknown	March 5, 2018
7	"Episode 7"	Unknown	Unknown	March 12, 2018
8	"Episode 8"	Unknown	Unknown	March 19, 2018
9	"Episode 9"	Unknown	Unknown	March 26, 2018
10	"Episode 10"	Unknown	Unknown	April 2, 2018

=== Season 3 (2019) ===
No.	Title	Directed by	Written by	Original release date
1	"Episode 1"	Unknown	Unknown	February 10, 2019
2	"Episode 2"	Unknown	Unknown	February 25, 2019
3	"Episode 3"	Unknown	Unknown	March 4, 2019
4	"Episode 4"	Unknown	Unknown	March 18, 2019
5	"Episode 5"	Unknown	Unknown	March 25, 2019
6	"Episode 6"	Unknown	Unknown	April 1, 2019
7	"Episode 7"	Unknown	Unknown	April 8, 2019
8	"Episode 8"	Unknown	Unknown	April 15, 2019
9	"Episode 9"	Unknown	Unknown	April 22, 2019
10	"Episode 10"	Unknown	Unknown	April 29, 2019

=== Season 4 (2021) ===
No.	Title	Directed by	Written by	Original release date
1	"Episode 1"	Unknown	Unknown	October 25, 2021
2	"Episode 2"	Unknown	Unknown	November 1, 2021
3	"Episode 3"	Unknown	Unknown	November 8, 2021
4	"Episode 4"	Unknown	Unknown	November 15, 2021
5	"Episode 5"	Unknown	Unknown	November 22, 2021
6	"Episode 6"	Unknown	Unknown	November 29, 2021
7	"Episode 7"	Unknown	Unknown	December 6, 2021
8	"Episode 8"	Unknown	Unknown	December 13, 2021

== Release ==
Streaming service Netflix purchased rights to broadcast Bonus Family from production company FLX in April 2017. As of July, 2019, seasons 1–3 are available in most countries on Netflix. A notable exception is in the Nordic countries, where only series 1 is currently offered on paid platform.
