= Hazel Brugger =

American-born Swiss author (born 1993)

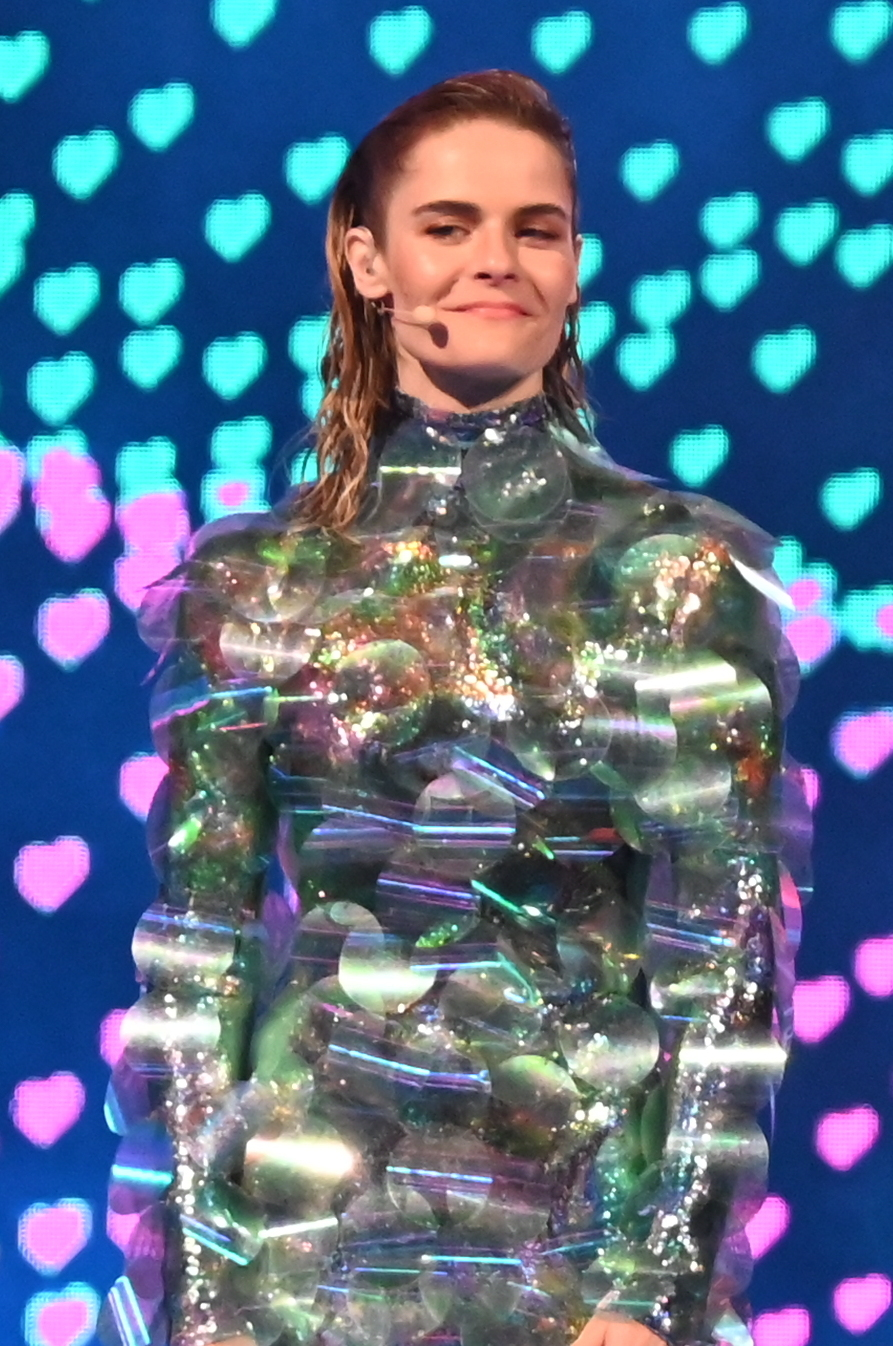
- Brugger in 2025
- Born: Allison Hazel Brugger; 9 December 1993 (age 32); San Diego, California, U.S.
- Occupations: Slam poet, comedian, cabaret artist, television presenter
- Spouse: Thomas Spitzer (m. 2020)
- Children: 2
- Website: hazelbrugger.com

Allison Hazel Brugger (born 9 December 1993) is a Swiss slam poet, comedian, cabaret artist, and television presenter.

== Background ==
Allison Hazel Brugger was born on 9 December 1993 in San Diego, California. Her father is Swiss neuropsychologist Peter Brugger and her mother is an English teacher who is originally from Cologne, Germany.

She grew up in Dielsdorf, near Zürich and has two older brothers. After graduating in Bülach, she began studying philosophy and literature at the University of Zurich, but she eventually quit. When she was 17, she started her poetry slam career in Winterthur, Switzerland northeast of Zürich.

From 2014 and 2017, Brugger wrote a fortnightly column for Das Magazin, a Swiss daily newspaper. From 2013 to 2014, she was a columnist for "Hochparterre" and the TagesWoche. In 2015, she was the moderator of the live talk show "Hazel Brugger Show and Tell" in the Theater am Neumarkt in Zürich which was held every two months. On 9 October 2013, she performed in the fourth Poetry Slam Championships in Bern, Switzerland. In November 2015, she started her first cabaret programme "Hazel Brugger passiert". In February 2019, she began to tour in Germany, Austria, and Switzerland with her second solo programme "Tropical", which debuted on Netflix on 2 December 2020.

In October 2020, Brugger announced that she was pregnant. She and Thomas Spitzer have been married since 2020. They have two daughters.

== Career ==
Since 2016, she has been a correspondent on the German political satire show heute-show on ZDF. On 26 April she had her first guest appearance on another ZDF satire-show, "Die Anstalt" (The Insane Asylum). In 2017 she won the Salzburger Stier, a prize for cabaret artists. She is the youngest person to ever win this award.

In 2019, Brugger started a YouTube series which she hosts with Spitzer, a co-producer and an author. The show is called Deutschland Was Geht, which translates to What's up, Germany?. In the show Brugger and Spitzer explore interesting and at times bizarre places together with various German comedians. In 2020 the show changed names to What's up, Europe?.

In 2025, she co-hosted the Eurovision Song Contest 2025 in Basel alongside Sandra Studer, with Michelle Hunziker joining for the final. As part of her role, she performed the musical number "Made in Switzerland" (with Studer and Petra Mede) in the first semi-final, which was later released as a single.

Brugger has lived in Cologne since 2016.

== Guest appearances ==
- Die Anstalt: 26 April 2016, 4 April 2017 and 22 May 2018
- Neo Magazin Royale: 1 September 2016
- Dittsche: 13 May 2016.
- Late Night Berlin: 2 December

== Books ==
- Ich bin so hübsch (I'm so pretty). Kein & Aber, Zürich 2016, ISBN 978-3-0369-5936-8.
- Hazel Brugger, Thomas Spitzer (Authors), Jannes Weber (Illustrations): Deutschland Was Geht – Das Wimmelbuch. Diogenes, Zürich 2021, ISBN 978-3-257-01294-1.

== Audiobooks ==
- Hazel Brugger passiert* : live im Café Kairo Bern. Audio-CD, Der gesunde Menschenversand, Luzern 2016, ISBN 978-3-03853-029-9.

== Awards ==
- 2013: «Swiss Master» of Poetry-Slam
- 2015: «Young Journalist of the Year» by the magazine Schweizer Journalist
- 2016: «Swiss Columnist of the Year» voted by a survey conducted by Schweizer Journalist among 1400 journalists.
- 2017: German prize for cabaret by the city of Mainz
- 2017: Salzburger Stier
- 2017: Bavarian cabaret prize for emerging artist
- 2017: Swiss Comedy Award
- 2017: German Comedy Award for Best Newcomer
- 2020: German Comedy Award for Best Female Comedian
- 2025: Bambi Award in Comedy

Preceded by (Sweden) Petra Mede and Malin Åkerman	Eurovision Song Contest presenter 2025; With: (Switzerland) Sandra Studer and Michelle Hunziker (final only)	Succeeded by (Austria) Victoria Swarovski and Michael Ostrowski
