= Tingeling =

Tingeling is a group of songs created and performed by Henrik Dorsin, Michael Lindgren, Andreas Alfredsson Grube, Andreas Grill, Jorge Olivares Rivas and Grotesco which served as entertainment during the intermission of the Melodifestivalen 2009. A version of the songs, namely Tingaliin was released as a single that peaked at number one on the Sverigetopplistan 27 March 2009. On 5 April 2009, it entered Svensktoppen.

The songs were a part of a series of sketches performed at Melodifestivalen in which the TV director Pål Potter, performed by the actor Rikard Ulvshammar, and music director Rolf Pihlman, performed by Dorsin, try to get a singer and a song from every city where Melodifestivalen is held. They fail each time, and Pihlman instead performs songs from his old dance band, mostly the stereotypical dance band song Tingeling, and remixes of it.

Versions included:

- Tingeling (a dance version)
- Singeling
- Blingeling
- Tingaliin

The latter was criticized by the Russian embassy in Stockholm for stereotyping. It became popular and reached the top of the Swedish Singles Chart.

== Album ==
Based on the success of the single "Tingaliin", an album was released containing various renditions:

1. "Tingaliin" (P-BROS feat DJ Trexx & Olga)
2. "Lite introsnack så..." (Rolf Pihlman)
3. "Tingeling" (original from 1977) (Tingeling)
4. "Solstingeling" (Xtra and The Lab Sound System)
5. "Tingäälingi" (Pirjo Hyvinäänen)
6. "El tingelino" (Don Jalapeño)
7. "Visan om Tingeling" (Buddha and Bastugatan)
8. "Blingeling" (Kapten Krok Crew)
9. "Lite mellansnack och det" (Rolf Pihlman)
10. "Tingeling, Tingeling" (Tingeling with Rolf Pihlman)
11. "The Bass is International" (DJ Trexx)
12. "Dangeland, dangelang" (Carl McRoo)
13. "Din vackraste klänningeling" (Lasse Andersson)
14. "Katschingeling" (Curlstie Spearsty)
15. "Två hjärtans tingeling" (Markusson & Forelli)
16. "Welcome to Internet" (DJ Trexx pres. Dr Internet)
17. "Tingeling (Disco Suburbia Remix)" (Bob Grillman)
18. "Tingaliin (Dancingeling Remix)" (DJ Boris)
19. "Fläskkarré med plommon" (Rolf Pihlman)
20. "Jaha, nu är det slutsnackat" (Rolf Pihlman)
21. "Singeling" (Rolf Pihlman)
22. "Farfars urin" (Rolf Pihlman)
