= Emma Molin =

Swedish comedian

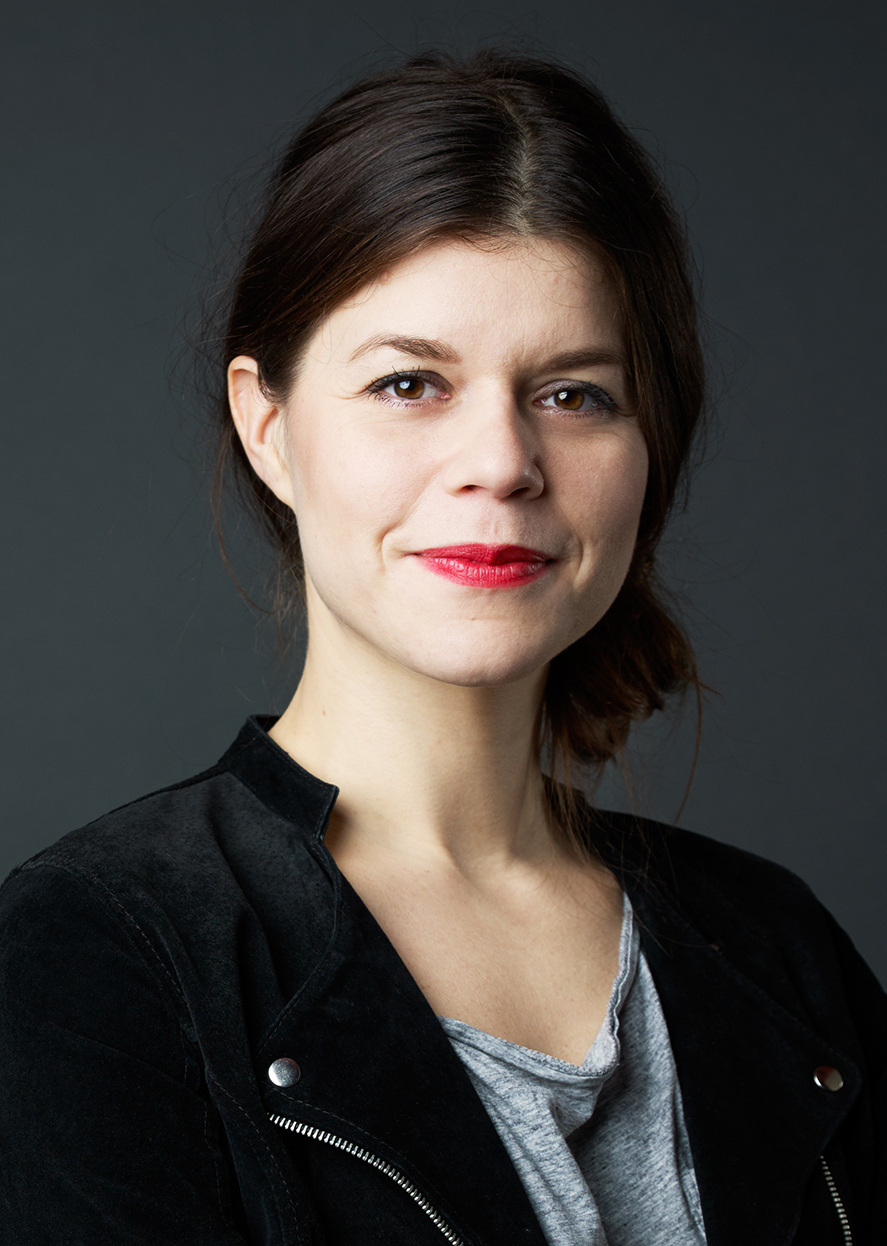
- Emma Molin in 2014
- Born: Emma Matilda Molin; 16 May 1979 (age 46); Haninge, Sweden
- Occupations: Actress, Comedian, Director

Emma Matilda Molin (born 16 May 1979) is a Swedish actress, comedian and director. She is best known for presenting the Grammis Awards, Gulbaggegalan and for being part of the comedy group Grotesco.

== Career ==
Molin has been a member of the comedy group Grotesco, she has directed and written an episode called Ladies Night which is about the inequality between male and female comedians in their business.

Between 2013 and 2015, she had the leading role in the Sveriges Radio UR series Livet i Bokstavslandet. She has also been part of the Kanal5 comedy show Partaj, and the Sveriges Radio show Pang Prego.

In 2018, Molin presented the Grammis Awards along with Amanda Ooms. She has also presented the Gulbaggegalan both in 2019 and 2020 on SVT. In 2018, Emma Molin presented an episode of Sommar i P1 where she told about her life and career. In 2018, she also competed in På spåret broadcast on SVT in team with Hanna Dorsin.

In 2021, Emma Molin presented the P3 gold together with Oscar Zia in Stockholm.

== Personal life ==
She was married to Grotesco member Jakob Setterberg, the couple divorced in 2020. They have two children together.
