= Michelle Hunziker =

Swiss and Italian television presenter and model (born 1977)

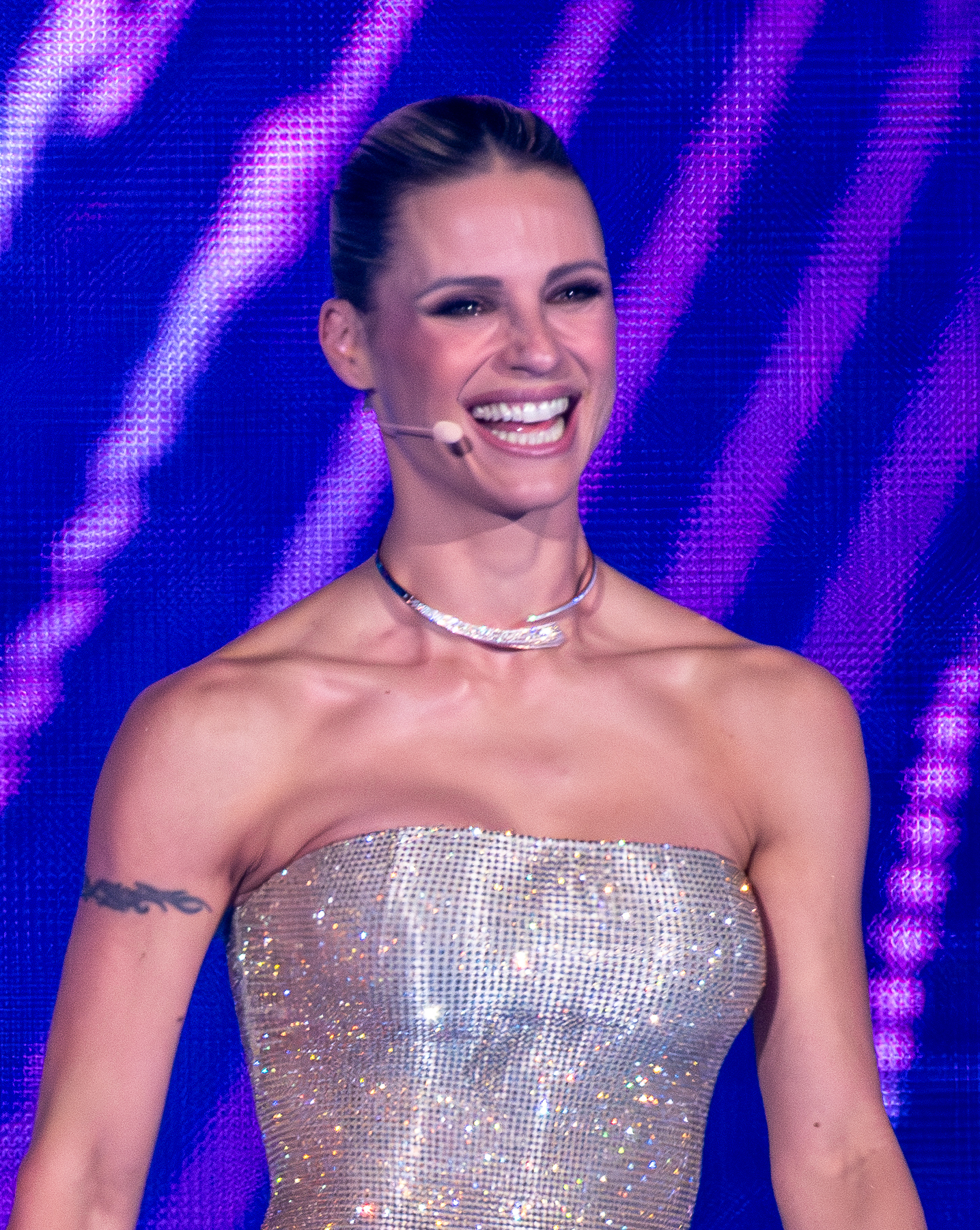
- Hunziker in 2025
- Born: Michelle Yvonne Hunziker; 24 January 1977 (age 49); Sorengo, Ticino, Switzerland
- Citizenship: Switzerland; Italy
- Occupations: Television presenter; actress; model
- Years active: 1994–present
- Height: 1.74 m (5 ft 9 in)
- Spouses: Eros Ramazzotti (m. 1998; div. 2009) Tomaso Trussardi (m. 2014; div. 2022)
- Children: 3

Michelle Yvonne Hunziker (Swiss Standard German: [miˈʃɛl ˈhʊntsɪkər], Italian: [miʃˈʃɛl ˈ(h)untsiker]; born 24 January 1977) is a Swiss and Italian (Note: Second citizenship obtained with marriage) television presenter and former model. She hosted the final of the Eurovision Song Contest 2025 in Basel alongside Hazel Brugger and Sandra Studer.

== Early life ==
Hunziker was born in Sorengo, Lugano, in the Italian-speaking part of Switzerland. Her mother Ineke is Dutch, with distant Indonesian ancestry, and her father Rudolf, who died of a heart attack in 2001, was a German-speaking Swiss painter who worked as a hotel manager. In 1983, the family moved to Ostermundigen, a suburb of Bern in the German-speaking part of Switzerland, where Hunziker attended elementary school. After moving to Milan, Italy, with her mother, she became a fashion model and was hired by Riccardo Gay, an agent. At 17 she posed for Armani, Rocco Barocco, La Perla, Colmar, Fuerte Ventura, Lovable and Swish. She speaks German, Italian, English, and Dutch.

== Career ==
As she was Eros Ramazzotti's fiancée, Hunziker was discovered by an Italian TV producer. In 1996, she presented the Rai Uno-show I cervelloni with Paolo Bonolis. In summer, she presented the prime time comedy show Paperissima Sprint (Canale 5) with Gabibbo. Because of her popularity, she hosted the afternoon show Colpo di Fulmine on Italia 1 in 1997. She attended the professional academy Music Art & Show in Milan with her choreographer Susanna Beltrami.

In 1998, the Italian film director Vincenzo Verdecchi offered Hunziker her first film role in the TV series La Forza dell'Amore (Canale 5). Afterwards she took the leading female role in Fammi stare sotto al letto. She was also in the documentary The Protagonist and in another film, Alex l'Ariete, where she acted with ex-skiing star Alberto Tomba. Hunziker and Pippo Baudo hosted the Canale 5 show La festa del Disco. From 1999 to 2001, she presented the late-night show Nonsolomoda (Canale 5) where she reported about fashion and lifestyle.

In 1999, TV3, the first Swiss private television station, was founded in Zürich, and Hunziker hosted a makeover show called Cinderella, where a hair and make-up artist, as well as a styling adviser, helped both a celebrity and a viewer have a makeover. After the first episode, Hunziker was caught in the crossfire. The Swiss newspaper Blick even wrote: "Cinderella, TV3's new lifestyle show is not bad. It is catastrophic". Later, Hunziker was interviewed by the Swiss-German magazine Schweizer Illustrierte and said that she could not speak German anymore after having lived in Italy for many years. After TV3 had changed the concept, the show became more popular.

After hosting the Swiss show Cinderella, Hunziker came to the attention of German TV producers. In 1998, she presented the Goldene Kamera awards show with Thomas Gottschalk, who was a very well-known German TV presenter. A year later, she co-hosted the show Michael Jackson & Friends (ZDF) in Munich. After she had been on various talk shows, she presented her first show in Germany caller Erstes Glück (SWR/Das Erste). She co-hosted the show with Thomas Elstner and interviewed celebrities about their first love. The show was not very popular however, and ultimately axed. When she returned to Italy, she presented the shows Donna sotto le stelle and Piazza di Spagna (Canale 5) with Gerry Scotti and Tacchi a spillo (Italia 1) with Claudio Lippi. In 2002–2004, Hunziker and Carsten Spengemann presented the first and second season of Deutschland sucht den Superstar, the German version of the British TV show Pop Idol.

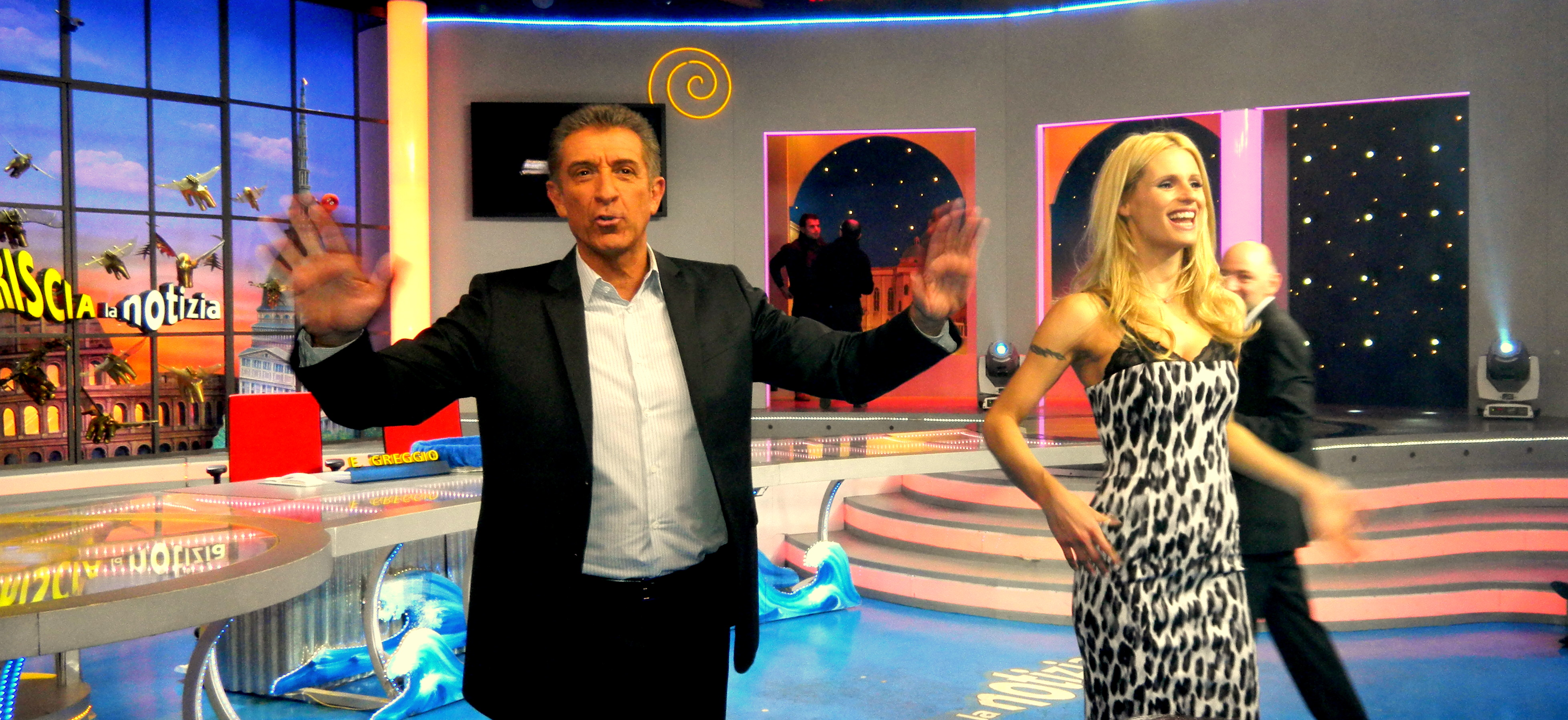
Hunziker hosting Striscia la notizia alongside Ezio Greggio in 2012

Hunziker joined ZDF's Wetten, dass..?, Germany's most popular TV show in October 2009. The show was also syndicated live on the Austrian ORF and SF1 in her native Switzerland.

In 2006, she released an album in English, Lole, that was available only in German-speaking countries; the only single released from the album was "From Noon Till Midnight".

Hunziker co-hosted the Italian comedy shows Zelig (Italia 1) and Scherzi a parte (Canale 5) in 2001. Zelig is one of the most famous Italian TV shows. Later that year, she received the Italian TV Oscar in the category "Discovery of the Year". She also co-hosted the Italian open-air music show Festivalbar with Daniele Bossari and Alessia Marcuzzi.

She has also starred in the musicals directed by Saverio Marconi The Sound of Music (playing the role of Maria von Trapp) and Cabaret (playing the role of Sally Bowles); both had huge success in Italy.

In 2007, Hunziker and Pippo Baudo hosted the Italian song contest, the Festival di Sanremo, on Rai Uno. Later, she co-hosted Striscia la notizia again with Ezio Greggio and Paperissima with Gerry Scotti.

In 2018, she again hosted the Sanremo Music Festival on Rai 1, this time with Claudio Baglioni and Pierfrancesco Favino. In 2020, she appeared in a video posted by Mimmo Modem, with a neomelodic song by Niko Pandetta, Marco Calone and Pino Franzese called "Danza".

In 2024, Hunziker hosted Andrea Bocelli 30: The Celebration on Canale 5.

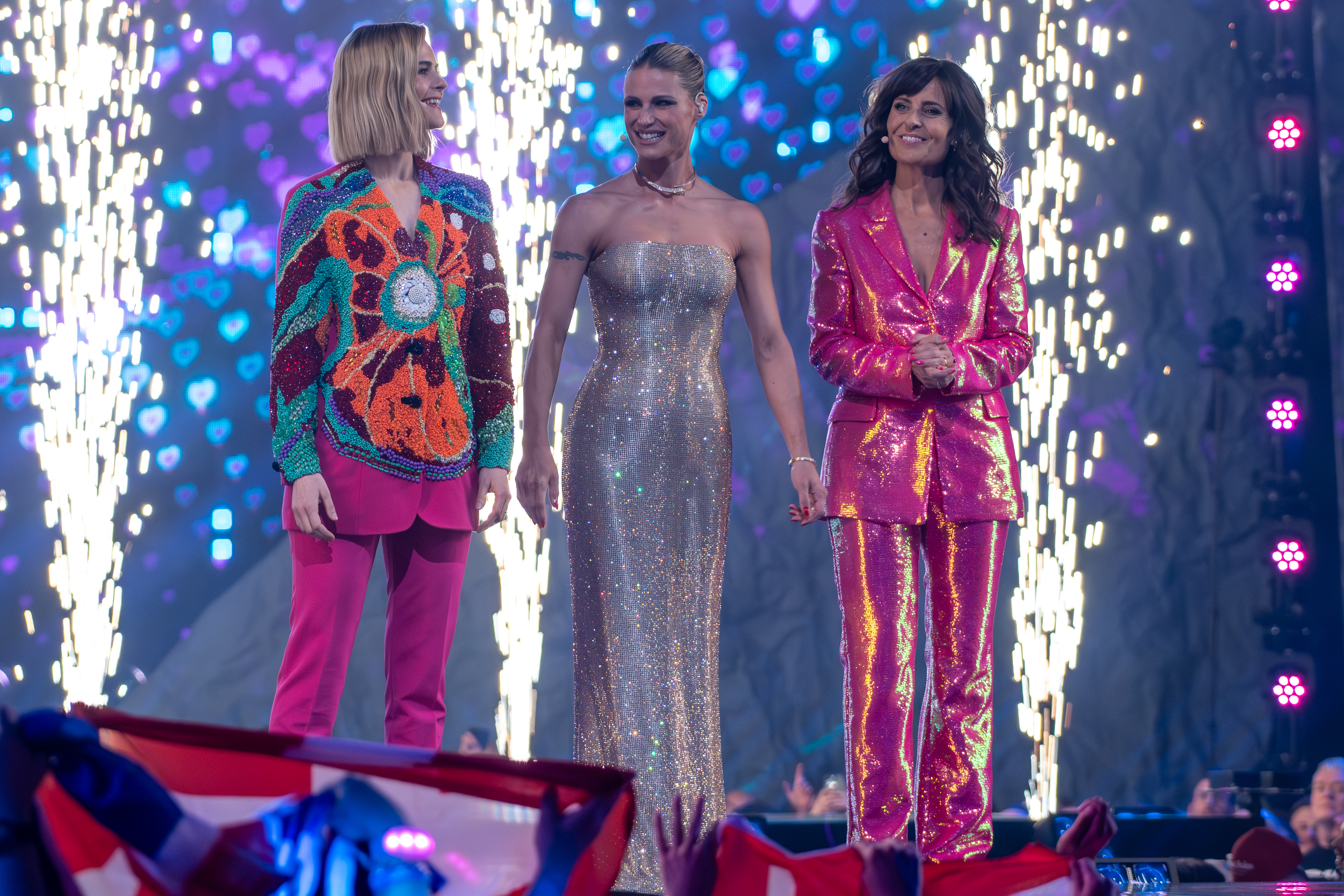
Hunziker hosting the Eurovision Song Contest alongside Hazel Brugger and Sandra Studer in 2025

In May 2025, she co-hosted the final of the Eurovision Song Contest in Basel, alongside Hazel Brugger and Sandra Studer.

Hunziker featured on Series 3 of Last One Laughing Deutschland, in which she was eliminated in the third episode.

== Personal life ==
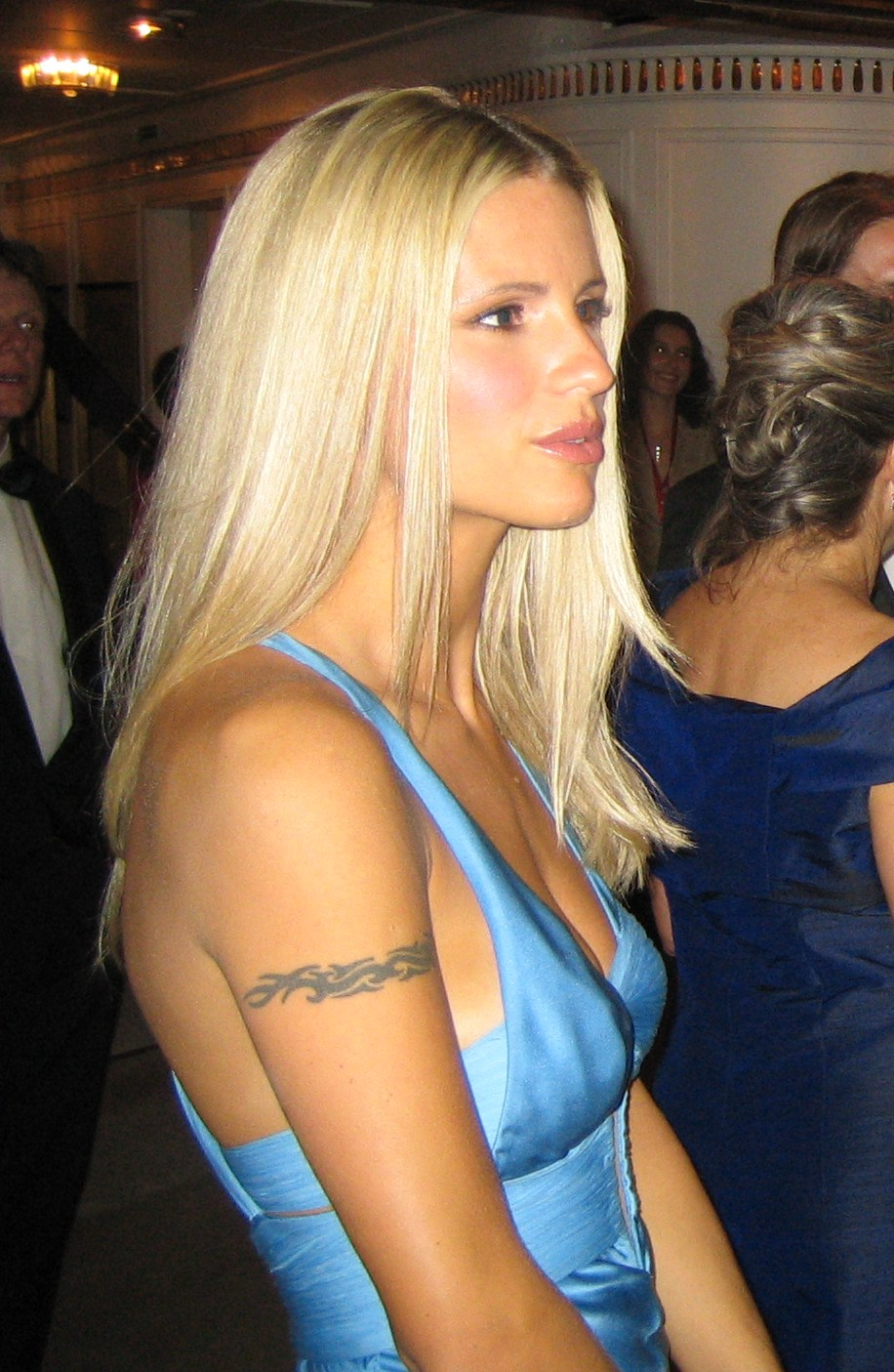
Hunziker in 2006

Hunziker married Italian singer Eros Ramazzotti in 1998, acquiring Italian citizenship. The two, who had a daughter named Aurora, separated in 2002 and divorced in 2009. In 2017, Hunziker announced that she blamed a cult for her divorce from Ramazzotti. She said that the cult tried to persuade her that he was a bad influence on her and to isolate her from her family.

Hunziker announced her engagement to the Trussardi heir Tomaso Trussardi in 2013. The couple, who divorced in 2022, have two daughters together.

In the fall of 2024, Hunziker and her daughter Aurora had the text "Liebe ohne Leiden", a song of Udo Jürgens tattooed on the neck.

== Filmography ==
Films
Year	Title	Role	Notes
1999	Voglio stare sotto al letto	Paola	
1999	The Protagonists	Sue	
2000	Alex l'ariete	Leva Bottazzi	
2005	Madagascar	Gloria (voice)	Italian dub
2007	Natale in crociera	Michela Bacci	
2008	Natale a Rio	Linda Vita	
2009	Natale a Beverly Hills	Serena	
2011	Amore nero	Laura	Short film
2017	Super vacanze di Natale	Various	Anthology film

Television
Year	Title	Role	Notes
1997	I misteri di Cascina Vianello	Gaia	Episode: "Un matrimonio e un funerale"
1998	La forza dell'amore	Tiziana	Miniseries
2004	Love Bugs	Michelle	Main role (season 1)
2018–2019	Idol x Warrior Miracle Tunes	Goddess of Music	Recurring role

== Television programs ==
Year	Title	Role	Notes
1994–1995	Buona Domenica	Contestant	Variety show (season 7)
1995	Mai dire Gol	Co-host	Comedy program (season 6)
1995–1996	Numero Uno	Reporter	Game show (season 2)
1996	I cervelloni	Co-host	Game show (season 3)
1997	Paperissima Sprint	Presenter	Comedy program (season 3)
1997–1998	Colpo di fulmine	Presenter	Reality show (season 3)
1999	La Partita del Cuore	Presenter	Special
2000–2003, 2014	Zelig	Co-host	Variety show (seasons 5–7, 17)
2001	Tacchi a spillo	Co-host	Talent show
2002	Scherzi a parte	Co-host	Prank/candid camera program (season 7)
2002	Festivalbar 2002	Co-host	Annual music festival
2003	Superstar	Presenter	Talent show (season 2)
2003	Festivalbar 2003	Co-host	Annual music festival
2004–present	Striscia la notizia	Presenter	Variety show (seasons 17–present)
2004–2013	Paperissima	Presenter	Comedy program (seasons 9–13)
2005	Chi ha incastrato lo zio Gerry?	Co-host	Comedy program
2006, 2008	Telegatto	Presenter	Awards ceremony
2007	Sanremo Music Festival 2007	Co-host	Annual music festival
2012–2013	Striscia la domenica	Presenter	Sunday version of Striscia la notizia
2016	Bocelli & Zanetti Night	Presenter	Special
2016	House Party	Guest host	Variety show, episode 2
2017	It's Showtime! Das Battle der Besten	Co-host	Talent show; Germany
2017	Das Sommer Open Air	Host	Music show; Germany
2018	Vuoi scommettere?	Host	Variety show
2019	Amici Celebrities	Guest host	Talent show (replacing Maria De Filippi for 3 episodes)
2019–2021	All Together Now	Host	Talent show
2020	Big Performance	Presenter	Variety show; Germany
2020	Pretty in Plüsch	Presenter	Variety show; Germany
2021	All Together Now Kids	Presenter	Talent show
2022–2024	Michelle Impossible	Presenter	Variety show
2022	LOL - Last One Laughing	Contestant	Comedy show;Germany
2023–2024	Io canto Generation	Jury	Talent show
2024–present	Io canto Family	Presenter	Talent show
2024	Andrea Bocelli 30: The Celebration	Presenter	Concert program
2024	Udo Jürgens For Ever	Presenter	TV Special; Germany
2025	Eurovision Song Contest	Presenters	Annual music festival
2025	Guinness World Records Germany	Presenter	Variety show; Germany
2025	Bambi Awards	Presenter	Award ceremony; Germany
2025	Pooh - Noi amici per sempre	Host	Music show
2025	Pavarotti 90 - L'uomo che emozionò il mondo	Host	Music show

== Notes ==
Preceded by (Sweden) Petra Mede and Malin Åkerman	Eurovision Song Contest presenter 2025 (final only); With: (Switzerland) Hazel Brugger and Sandra Studer	Succeeded by (Austria) Victoria Swarovski and Michael Ostrowski
