= Tingaliin =

Single by P-Bros featuring DJ Trexx & Olga Pratilova
- Released: March 2009
- Recorded: 2009
- Label: NFM

Music video
- "Tingaliin" on YouTube

This article is partly or fully translated from the Swedish Wikipedia article.

"Tingaliin" (full title: "Tingaliin (Russian Bass-Lovers Remix)"), is song performed by, among others, the Swedish comedian Henrik Dorsin, who says it aims at showing common Swedish prejudices towards Russia. The song faced severe criticism from Russian embassy in Stockholm for its image of Russia.

"Tingaliin" was the last of the series of Tingeling songs performed by Dorsin during the intermissions of the Melodifestivalen 2009 in preparation for Eurovision Song Contest 2009, scheduled to be organized in Moscow. "Tingaliin" is a Russian version of the Tingeling song, credited to P-Bros featuring DJ Trexx & Olga Pratilova. It reached the top of the Swedish Singles Chart on 27 March 2009 and stayed at the top of the charts for 4 weeks.

"Tingaliin", the Russian version, was designed as the final entry of the "Tingeling" series, at Melodifestivalen in Stockholm. The Russian segment consisted of a pre-recorded sketch followed by a musical anthem performed on-stage.

== Content ==
The sketch was set in Moscow, where the characters Pål Potter, (played by the actor Rikard Ulvshammar) and music director Rolf Pihlman, wearing a fur hat (played by Henrik Dorsin) contact the Russian "Schlager mafia" and the Russian opera singer Olga Pratilova to get her to perform Tingeling, resulting in a stage appearance with a remix partly in Russian, called "Tingaliin (Russian Bass-Lovers Remix)".

The performance is full of Russian clichés and stereotypes, such as an army choir, matryoshka dolls, cossack dancers, tetris, the National Anthem of the Soviet Union and Korobeiniki.

The text contains also Russian phrases such as "Do svidanija Putin" (’Bye bye Putin’) and "Na zdorovje Lenin" (’Cheers Lenin’).

== Controversy ==
"Tingaliin" led to strong criticism and protests from the Embassy of Russia in Stockholm. Anatoly Kargapolov, an embassy spokesman, said in an interview with The Local newspaper that "it is for us, unimaginable that Sweden can show such an ignorance and misleading image of Russia. The depiction is disgusting."

The following days, the controversy got attention in TV-news, radio programs, and morning- and evening newspapers. The project manager Ronnie Lans later apologized and sent flowers to the Russian Embassy, but the Swedish TV network Sveriges Television withdrew the apology.

Chart (2009)	Peak position
Swedish Singles Chart	1
