= Panik i tomteverkstan =

- Country of origin: Sweden
- Original language: Swedish

Original release
- Network: SVT
- Release: 1 December – 24 December 2019

Related
- Storm på Lugna gatan (2018); Mirakel (2020)

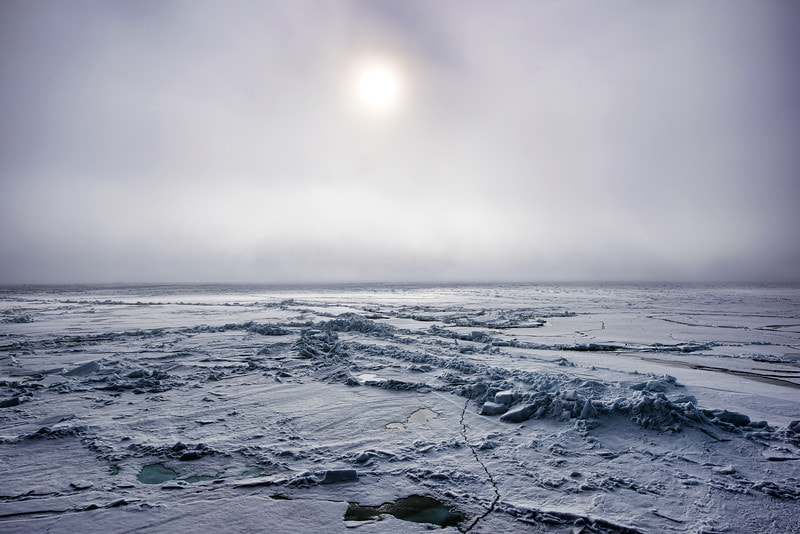
The Arctic, where Santa Claus lives with his family in the story.

Panik i tomteverstan (Panic in Santa's workshop) is the 2019 Sveriges Television's Christmas calendar directed by Fredde Granberg and Thomas Claesson.

== Cast ==
- Per Andersson – Santa
- Pernilla Wahlgren – Santa's wife
- Elis Nyström
- Elisabeth Drejenstam – Papadogeorgou
- Suzanne Reuter
- Leif Andrée – Snowman
- Marie Robertson
- Katarina Ewerlöf
- Christina Schollin – Santa's grandmother
- Victor Beer
- Sven Melander
- Allan Svensson
- Rolf Skoglund
- Malin Cederbladh
- Michael Lindgren- Bertil the Krampus
- Marko ”Markoolio” Lehtosalo
- Helge Skoog
