= Sandra Studer =

Swiss TV presenter and singer

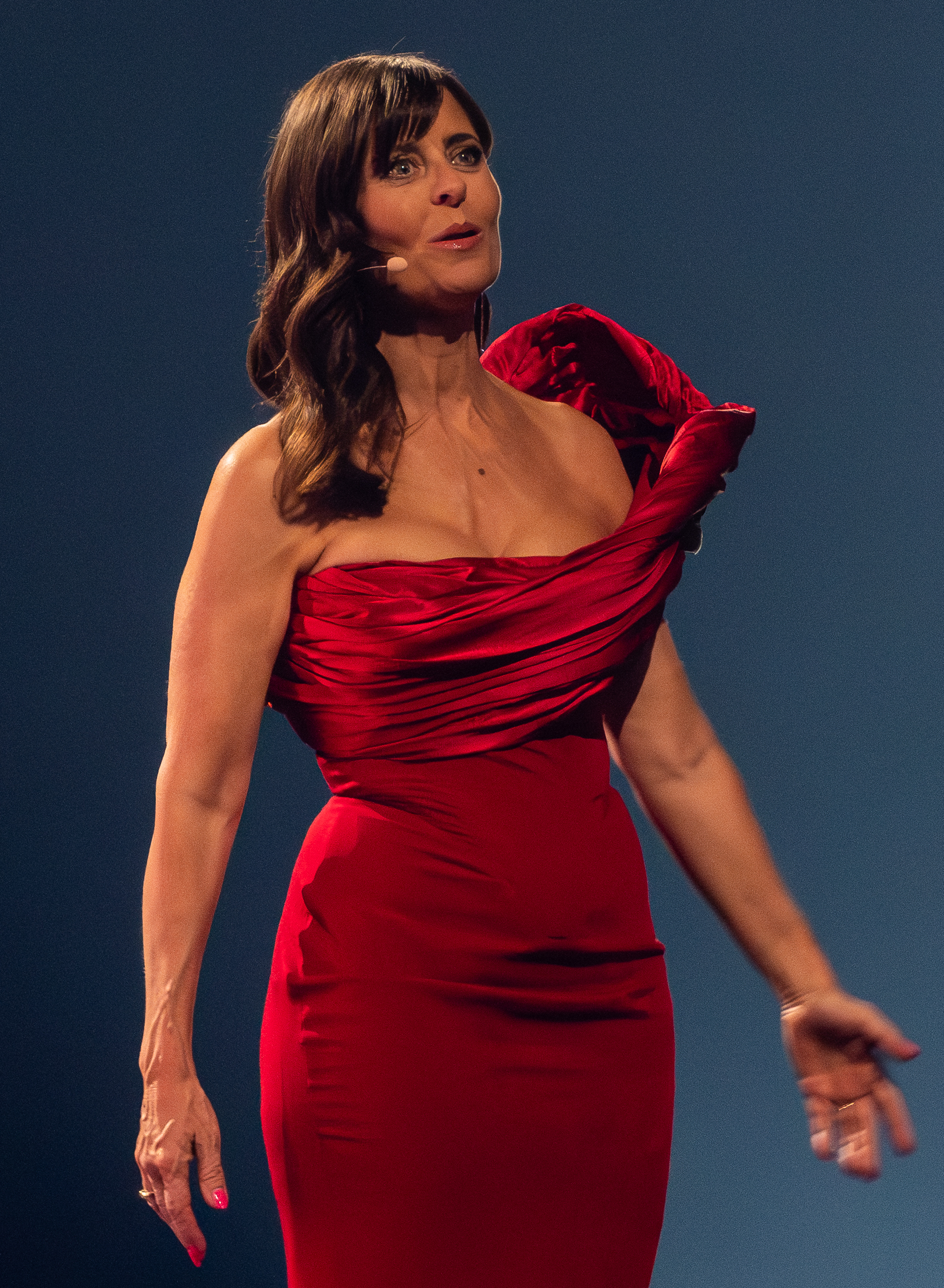
- Studer in 2025
- Born: 10 February 1969 (age 57); Zurich, Switzerland
- Other name: Sandra Simó
- Occupations: Television presenter; Singer
- Years active: 1990–present
- Spouse: Luka Müller (m. 1997)
- Children: 4

Sandra Studer (born 10 February 1969), also known as Sandra Simó, is a Swiss television presenter and singer. She represented Switzerland in the Eurovision Song Contest 1991, where she placed fifth with the song "Canzone per te". She co-hosted the Eurovision Song Contest 2025 alongside Hazel Brugger, with Michelle Hunziker joining for the final.

== Biography ==
Born to a Swiss father and a Spanish mother, Studer grew up in the Zollikerberg. After ballet and piano education, she made her first experiences as a singer at the age of 17. She studied German and musicology at the University of Zurich. In 1989, she was the first recording of DJ BoBo for the song "I Love You". Under the stage name Sandra Simó, she represented Switzerland in the Eurovision Song Contest 1991; her Italian-sung song "Canzone per te" placed fifth.

She became a successful television presenter with shows such as Takeito, Dream Destination and Country roads. She frequently gave German-language commentary at the Eurovision Song Contest for the Swiss Broadcasting Corporation (SRG SSR); in 1999, she hosted alongside Axel Bulthaupt on Norddeutscher Rundfunk (NDR) the German national final for Eurovision. From 2002 to 2012, Studer hosted the gala for the Swiss Award once a year. She also performs in musicals in the German-speaking areas of the country. In the television show The Masked Singer Switzerland, she took second place in the disguise of a peacock in 2021.

In 2025, she co-hosted the Eurovision Song Contest 2025 alongside Hazel Brugger, with Michelle Hunziker joining for the final. As part of her role, she performed the musical number "Made in Switzerland" (with Brugger and Petra Mede) in the first semi-final; a cover of "Insieme: 1992" (the winning song for Italy in 1990) in the second semi-final; and a snippet of her 1991 contest entry "Canzone per te" in the final.

In 1997, Studer married lawyer Luka Müller and is a mother of four.

Awards and achievements
Preceded by Egon Egemann with "Musik klingt in die Welt hinaus"	Switzerland in the Eurovision Song Contest; 1991	Succeeded by Daisy Auvray with "Mister Music Man"
Preceded by (Sweden) Petra Mede and Malin Åkerman	Eurovision Song Contest presenter 2025; With: (Switzerland) Hazel Brugger and Michelle Hunziker (final only)	Succeeded by (Austria) Victoria Swarovski and Michael Ostrowski
