= Thomas Spitzer (author) =

German author, comedian and online producer

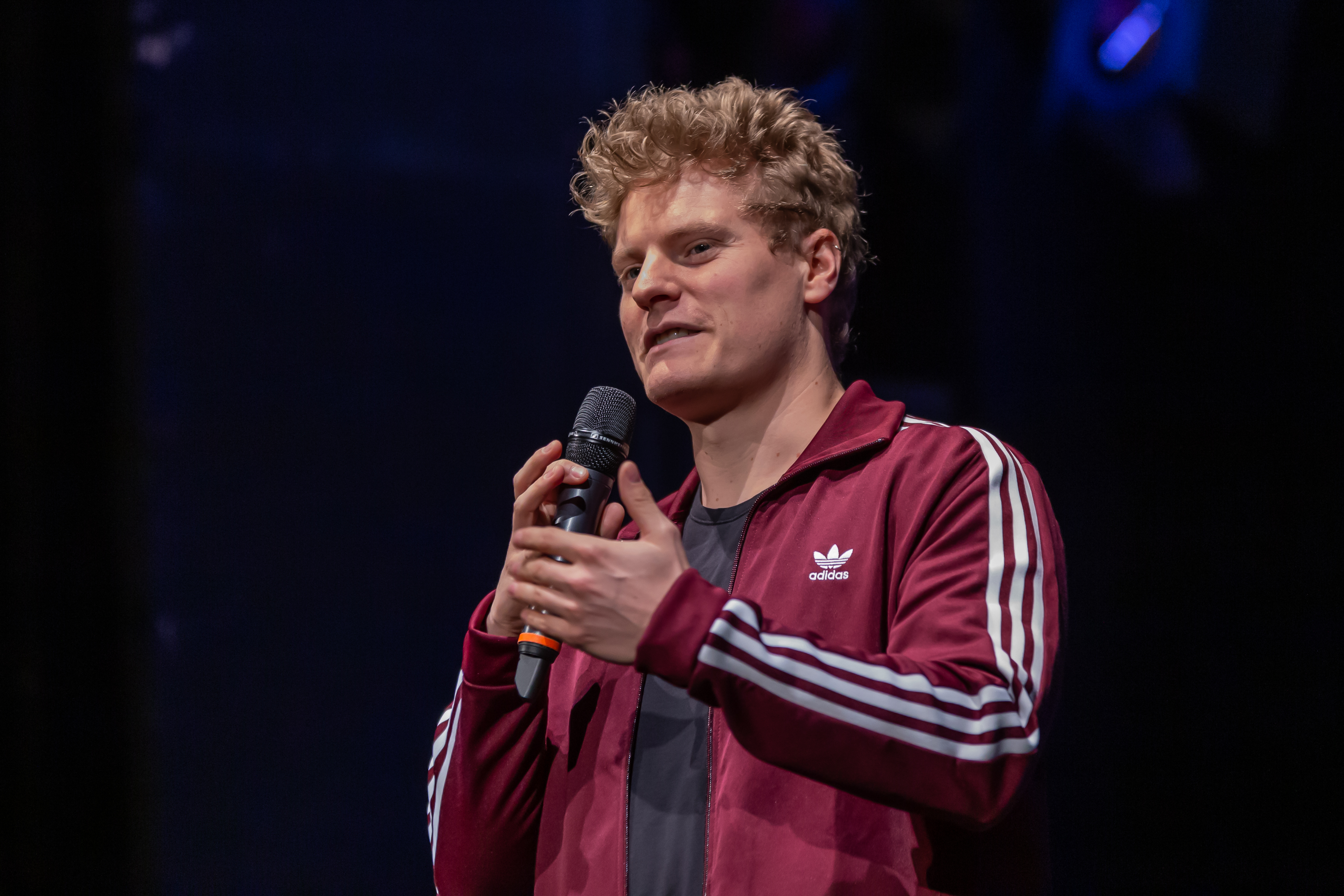
- Spitzer in 2019
- Born: Thomas Eduard Spitzer; 29 September 1988 (age 37); Freiburg im Breisgau, Baden-Württemberg, West Germany
- Occupations: Author; Comedian; Online producer
- Spouse: Hazel Brugger (m. 2020)
- Children: 2
- Father: Manfred Spitzer
- Website: www.thomas-spitzer.de

Thomas Eduard Spitzer (born 29 September 1988, in Freiburg im Breisgau) is a German author, comedian and online producer.

== Early life ==
Spitzer is the son of the German professor and publicist Manfred Spitzer. He grew up in Hofsgrund in Oberried, Baden-Württemberg, Boston, Massachusetts, Eugene, Oregon, and Ulm. He studied math, economics and philosophy at the University of Regensburg from 2008 to 2012 and graduated with a Bachelor of Science. He has four siblings. In October 2020, he and Swiss comedian Hazel Brugger announced that they are expecting a child. They have been married since 2020. They have two daughters.

== Career ==
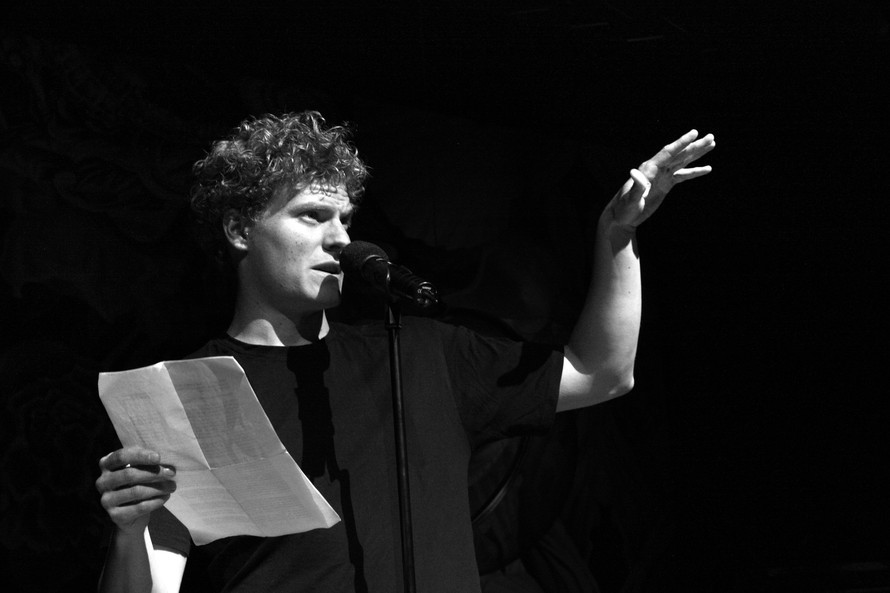
Thomas Spitzer at the poetry slam Raus mit der Sprache in Bonn 2013

In 2009 Spitzer had his first gig at a poetry slam. By now he has won over 200 poetry slams in Germany, Austria, Liechtenstein and Switzerland. In 2012 he reached the semi-finals of the German championships in Heidelberg. In 2015 he scored third in the Bavarian championships in Ingolstadt.

He has also starred in the NDR Comedy Contest. In the fall of 2016 he won the Nightwash Talent Award, which is an important award for young comedians in Germany. After that he appeared in comedy formats more often than poetry slams.

In the summer of 2014 he published his first book, Wir sind glücklich, unsere Mundwinkel zeigen in die Sternennacht wie bei Angela Merkel, wenn sie einen Handstand macht which translates to "We are happy, the corners of our mouths point to the starry night like Angela Merkel‘s when she performs a handstand". In 2014, the online community Was liest Du? ("What are you reading?") awarded the book "Most unusual book title" at the Leipzig Book Fair.

In fall 2018 Spitzer started writing for the ZDF heute-show.

=== Projects ===
In 2013 Spitzer started organizing the German poetry slam championships for people below the age of 20, together with event organizer Ko Bylanzky. This led to the competition "Master of the Uni-Vers" which has been held ever since in Regensburg which attracted 1500 visitors. It is now held semi-annually, so far it was always sold out and it has seen many famous participants and guests such as Hazel Brugger, Felix Lobrecht and Vincent Pfäfflin.

In the summer of 2017, Thomas launched the comedy podcast "Comedy Gold" together with comedian Thomas Schmidt and it quickly advanced to one of the most popular humorous podcasts in Germany. It is broadcast every Monday and hasn't seen a single interruption since its launch. The podcast inspired Felix Lobrecht and Tommi Schmitt to start their now highly successful podcast "Gemischtes Hack" and they recorded their first episode with Spitzer's equipment.

Spitzer has been managing the YouTube channel Hazel and Thomas since 2019 together with Hazel Brugger. Together they produce a series called Deutschland was geht? ("What's up Germany?") in which they visit interesting and weird places in Germany often with famous friends and guests.

== Published work ==
- Wir sind glücklich, unsere Mundwinkel zeigen in die Sternennacht wie bei Angela Merkel, wenn sie einen Handstand macht. Includes a CD. Periplaneta, Berlin 2014, ISBN 978-3-943876-78-9.
- Die Omadialoge. Unsichtbar-Verlag, Diedorf 2014, ISBN 978-3-95791-006-6.
- (together with Kaleb Erdmann and David Friedrich) Bunt und kühl. ConBrio, Regensburg 2013, ISBN 978-3-940768-40-7.
- Goethe, Schiller, Chinakohl – Als Humorbotschafter im Land des Lächelns. Bastei Lübbe, Köln 2016, ISBN 978-3-404-60911-6.
