= Alex l'ariete =

- Directed by: Damiano Damiani
- Written by: Dardano Sacchetti
- Produced by: Vittorio Cecchi Gori; Rita Rusić
- Starring: Alberto Tomba; Michelle Hunziker
- Cinematography: Alessandro Grossi
- Edited by: Claudio Cutry
- Music by: Claudio Guidetti
- Distributed by: Cecchi Gori Group
- Release date: July 28, 2000 (Italy)
- Running time: 111 minutes
- Country: Italy
- Language: Italian
- Budget: $3.5 million
- Box office: $4775

Alex l'ariete (Alex the ram) is a 2000 crime film directed by Damiano Damiani, starring former World cup alpine ski racer Alberto Tomba and Michelle Hunziker.

Produced by Vittorio Cecchi Gori and Rita Rusić, the movie marks the debut of Alberto Tomba's acting career. However, Alex l'ariete was a box-office bomb and was panned by critics for its banal plot, approximate editing and Tomba's acting performance which many seen as involuntarily funny. Bad reviews and word of mouth prompted the film's producers to withdraw it from theaters after a few days.

In Italy, during the years, Alex l'ariete gained a "so bad it's good" reputation and became a cult among the fans of the B-movies.

== Plot ==
The protagonist is the Carabiniere Alessandro Corso, nicknamed "The ram" for his impetuousness and physical prowess. Transferred to a small town in the Apennines after a raid that ended with the death of a close friend and colleague of his, Alex is charged with escorting a girl, Antavleva Bottazzi, known as Leva, and bringing her to testify before a judge. The girl has been accused of murder, when in reality she is the eyewitness able to frame the real culprits, who are on her trail.

== Cast ==
- Alberto Tomba as Alessandro "The ram" Corso
- Michelle Hunziker as Antavleva "Leva" Bottazzi
- Massimo Poggio as Robbi
- Tony Kendall as the Commander
- Gianni Franco as Brigadiere Santucci
- Giorgio Gobbi as the Maresciallo of Monte dell'Olmo
- Orso Maria Guerrini as Barra
- Giovanni Cianfriglia as Barra's sidekick
- Giovanni Visentin as Grande Maiale
- Tullio Sorrentino as The man who smokes yellow cigarettes
- Corinne Cléry as Ernestina
- Ramona Badescu as Fabiana
- Roberto Ceccacci as a car driver
- Ottaviano Dell'Acqua as Il biondo
- Roberto Dell'Acqua as a criminal
- Elena Presti as Giada

== Production ==
The film was initially born as a detective fiction in two ninety-minute episodes, called Turbo, which was supposed to air on Mediaset networks and whose protagonist had already been designated as Alberto Tomba, who had retired from competitions and was trying to launch his career as a television personality. In October 1998 Tomba and the co-star, also already chosen in Michelle Hunziker, appeared on the cover of TV Sorrisi e Canzoni to promote the fiction. The project was later shelved and turned into a film destined for the cinema.

Director Damiano Damiani said in an interview with La Stampa that Vittorio Cecchi Gori offered him the direction of the film and that he gladly accepted, putting aside other projects. Damiani also spent good words both for Tomba ("Unlike many established performers, [...] he immediately understood the importance that technique plays in cinema" and "that cinema, just like sport, imposes sacrifices and above all obedience") and for Hunziker ("She is a girl who has talent and wants to go her own way, I like her").

The film was shot in about two and a half months, from September 21 to December 3, 1998, for a total cost of approximately 6 billion lire.

Filming took place in the province of Rome (more precisely in Rome and Ciciliano), in the railway station of Ronciglione, and in the Dolomites.

During filming, Tomba rejected the stunt double in the most dangerous scenes, later declaring himself "happy to have lived that experience", calling it "tiring but fun".

The creation of a sequel was planned, entitled La gara di Alex (lit. 'Alex's Race'), set in the world of motorcycling with former MotoGP champion Valentino Rossi as the protagonist. The project was never carried out.

== Release ==
The film was released in Italian cinemas on July 28, 2000, and defined as the "first cinematic slalom" of former skier Alberto Tomba.

== Reception ==
=== Box office ===
Alex l'ariete performed disastrously at the box office: during the first weekend, only 285 spectators – one third of which in Bologna, hometown of Alberto Tomba – bought the ticket to see the film at the cinema, for a total income of Lire 3.693.000 (about 2300 US Dollars). The movie reached the 44th position in the ranking of the most viewed films of the period, and at the end of the year the film failed to enter in the list of the 100 most viewed films of the 2000/2001 period. During the entire programming period, the film was seen only by 597 spectators, and due to its poor performance it was removed from Italian cinemas after only two days of screening. In the theaters owned by the Cecchi Gori Group, in Rome, Alex l'Ariete remained in programming until the following Sunday, for a total screening period of only ten days.

The direction of Damiano Damiani has been defined as "distracted" and "unrecognizable"

About the film's failure, Tomba initially stated that the cause was attributed to the programming period, because "nobody goes to the cinema during Summer" – his statement is contradicted by the fact that Mission: Impossible II, which was screened in the same period, gained more than Lire 6 billions ($3.7 million) in the first weekend only - while Hunziker commented ironically that the movie was seen only "by me, my aunt and my grandma". Actor Massimo Poggio (who plays Robbi, Alex's colleague who dies at the beginning of the film) joked about the movie's failure, stating that he has never seen the whole film: "They told me about it. However, I died after a few scenes. Tomba's fault, of course: he hadn't covered me."

A few years later, in an interview with TgCom24, Tomba stated that he had "beautiful, but distant memories" of the shooting. He admitted that "my inexperience counted", but that according to him the real problem was that "I trusted those who offered the job, but the editing was not done as it should, three hours of film had to be worked and transformed into a one-hour fiction and not just left as they were. The script didn't work, and the director, Damiano Damiani, good but too old, poor thing... The bottom line is that they didn't want an Olympian to be an actor: they didn't direct me the right way."

=== Critical response ===
The film received extremely negative reviews unanimously from film critics and is widely considered among the worst Italian movies ever made.

According to film critic Gianni Canova Alex l'ariete is "clumsy", while Massimo Bertarelli, in the book Millecinquecento film da evitare, gave the film a vote of 2/10, criticizing the acting of the two protagonists and the direction of Damiani, defining the latter as "unrecognizable".

Maurizio Porro, in his review in Corriere della Sera, wrote that the film is "a joke", that "Tomba is Tomba, a non-actor who is aware of being one and who plays his charm" and that Damiani "lists a number of stereotypes of action cinema and comedy". Luca Bottura, in L'Unità, defined it "the film that made the Lumière brothers regret having invented cinema", concluding that "as a comic bomb it really does not fear rivals". In La gazzetta dello sport, Tomba's acting is defined as "very awkward and inexpressive".

The film dictionary Il Mereghetti gives the movie one star out of four, arguing that the movie "can't make people laugh even unintentionally" and that "the former ski champion [...] seems to be reading the phone book, while the squawking Hunziker really arouses murderous instincts".

Stefania Iannuzzi on MYmovies.it awarded the film two stars out of five, stating that "it offers numerous moments of involuntary comedy" and harshly criticizing the performances of Tomba ("His interpretation is ridiculous") and Hunziker ("Graceful, for sure, but absolutely unfit for the role"), while Enrico Magrelli on FilmTv.it comments that Damiani's direction is "distracted" and judges the screenplay to be "less likely than some old children's comics", concluding that the whole movie is "ugly, bungled, written by real illiterates, and played by poorly organized unemployed". Davide Pulici on Nocturno highlights the absence of dubbing as an unfavorable point for the interpretation of the actors and underlines the lack of real direction by Damiani, arguing that "[either] he directed by telephone or, if there was, he was sleeping."

In Evening Standard, the film was described as "incredibly ugly".

== Awards ==
Alberto Tomba won the Cinepernacchie satirical award for Worst Actor with the motivation "Why, Tomba, why?", and received a nomination for Worst Actor at the Fiaschi d'oro award for "the worst of Italian cinema" organized by the No Business Like That association (the prize was won by Andrea Pezzi for 20 - Venti).
