= Made in Switzerland (song) =

Single by Hazel Brugger, Sandra Studer and Petra Mede
- Released: 6 June 2025
- Genre: Show tune
- Length: 5:13
- Label: Manifester; SRG SSR
- Songwriters: Christian Knecht; Lukas Hobi
- Producers: Jon Hällgren; Pele Loriano; Benji Alasu; Lukas Hällgren; Martin Landström

Official performance video
- "Made in Switzerland" on YouTube

"Made in Switzerland" is a musical number performed by Swiss television presenters Hazel Brugger and Sandra Studer, along with Swedish television presenter Petra Mede. Debuting as an interval act in the first semi-final of the Eurovision Song Contest 2025 on 13 May 2025, it was released as a single on 6 June.

== Context and sequence ==
"Made in Switzerland" was the first of two interval acts during the first semi-final of the Eurovision Song Contest 2025, which honoured Switzerland's history in the contest; the 2025 event was being held in the Swiss city of Basel. It celebrated Swiss cultural heritage, showcasing stereotypes, inventions, and traditions in a light-hearted and satirical way. The act was primarily performed by the show's presenters Hazel Brugger and Sandra Studer, with a guest role from Petra Mede, who had previously acted as presenter of the contest in 2013, 2016 and 2024.

The act begins by Studer explaining how organising the Eurovision Song Contest is an opportunity for the hosting country to "break down old stereotypes", before listing various stereotypes associated with Switzerland: watchmaking, chocolate, and wintry weather, followed by a recounting of various Swiss inventions such as processed cheese and the Swiss Army knife. The set transforms into an informercial-style studio, where Brugger and Studer "advertises" more Swiss-made products, including Muesli, the World Wide Web, LSD, and cellophane, and mentions the theory of relativity as "theoretically made in Switzerland". The two presenters then preface a section of the act that reinterprets the origins of the contest in the theme of Swiss folklore. The scene changes to 1250s Helvetia, where William Tell (Mede) addresses a crowd of struggling townsfolk not to perpetrate more violence, but instead to imagine "a world without division" by means of devising a music competition. Brugger notably emphasises that it is "non-political, strictly neutral", welcomes gender diversity, and features extravagant staging, while the extra performers additionally highlight Swiss direct democracy and the "voting system". Closing the act, the presenters and all extra performers gather in a curtain call to summarise the contest's Swiss origins.

== Charts ==
Chart performance for "Made in Switzerland"
Chart (2025)	Peak position
Switzerland (Schweizer Hitparade)	16
