= Manfred Spitzer =

German neuroscientist and psychiatrist (born 1958)

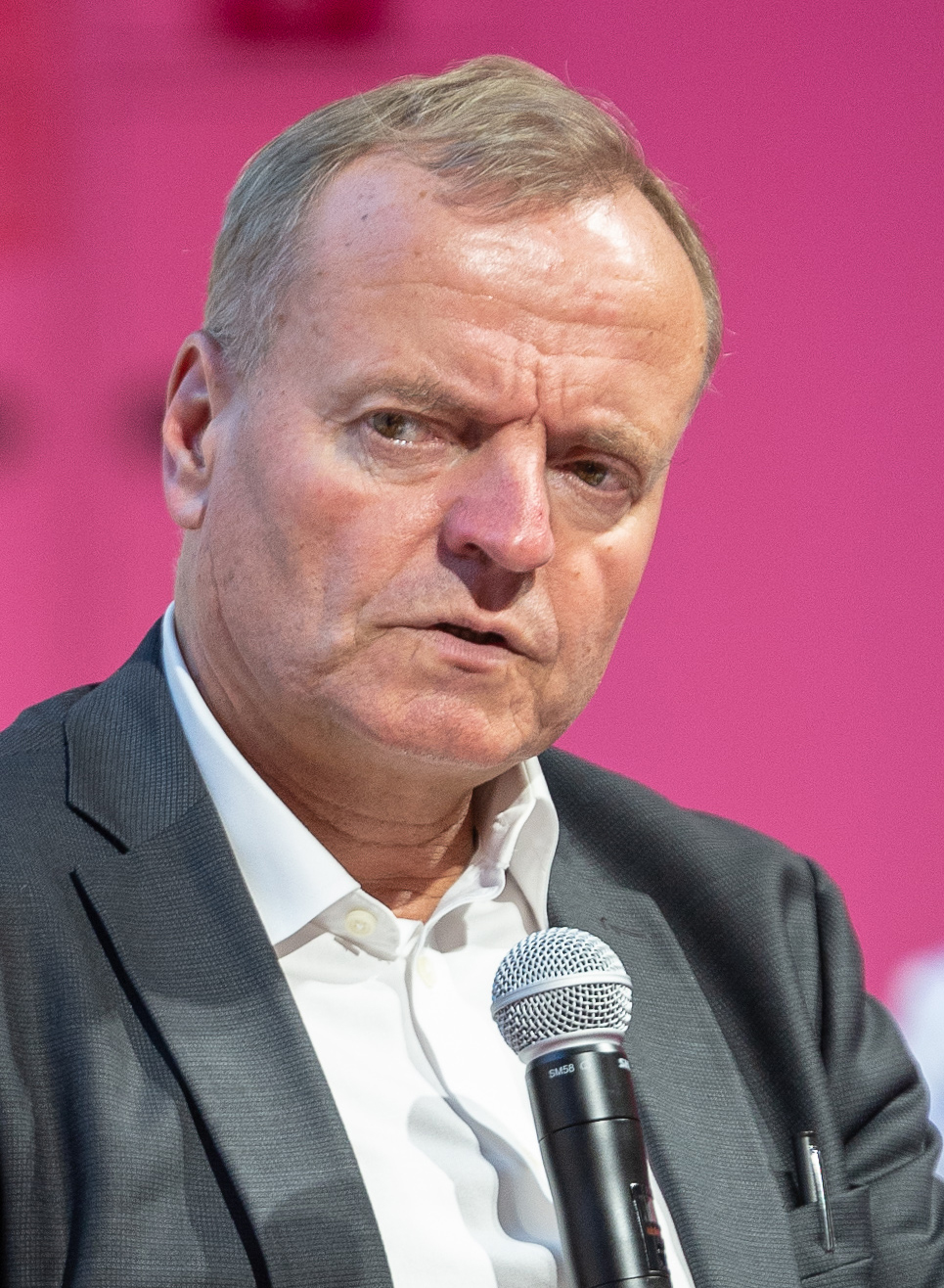
- Spitzer in 2018
- Born: 27 May 1958 (age 68); Lengfeld, Darmstadt, Hesse, Germany
- Children: 5; including Thomas Spitzer

Academic background
- Education: University of Freiburg

Academic work
- Institutions: University of Ulm

Manfred Spitzer (born 27 May 1958) is a German neuroscientist, psychiatrist and author.

== Life ==
Spitzer was born in 1958 in Lengfeld, Darmstadt, Hesse, Germany. After his Abitur at the Max-Planck-Gymnasium in Groß-Umstadt, he studied medicine, philosophy and psychology at the University of Freiburg. During this time he earned his money for living as a street musician among other professions. Spitzer is the publisher of the trade journal Nervenheilkunde and a member of the Board of Trustees of the Stiftung Louisenlund. He has a controversial opinion on smartphones, saying that they make children "krank" ("ill"), "dumm" ("stupid") and "süchtig" ("addicted") and should only be allowed without supervision from age 18. German science magazine Bild der Wissenschaft observed that Spitzer's best-selling book about the topic, Digitale Demenz ("digital dementia") was "torn apart" by most reviewers: "Indeed, Spitzer makes argumentative leaps, draws bold conclusions, and comes up with hair-raising comparisons. Although he also cites many scientific studies, he often sweeps inconsistent details, critical comments by the authors, and contradictory studies under the rug. His academic peers reacted with corresponding annoyance.

He has five children, including Thomas Spitzer.

== Awards ==
- 1992: DGPPN-Duphar-Forschungsförderpreis of the Deutsche Gesellschaft für Psychiatrie und Psychotherapie, Psychosomatik und Nervenheilkunde
- 2002: Cogito-Preis of the Cogito Foundation

== Works (selection) ==
- Halluzinationen. Ein Beitrag zur allgemeinen und klinischen Psychopathologie. Springer, Berlin 1988, ISBN 3-540-18611-5.
- Was ist Wahn? Untersuchungen zum Wahnproblem. Springer, Berlin 1989, ISBN 3-540-51072-9.
- Geist im Netz. 1996.
- with Leo Hermele: Von der Degeneration zur Antizipation – Gedanken zur nicht-Mendelschen Vererbung neuropsychiatrischer Erkrankungen aus historischer und aktueller Sicht. In: Gerhardt Nissen, Frank Badura (Hrsg.): Schriftenreihe der Deutschen Gesellschaft für Geschichte der Nervenheilkunde. Band 2. Würzburg 1996, S. 111–127.
- Ketchup und das kollektive Unbewusste. Geschichten aus der Nervenheilkunde. Schattauer, Stuttgart 2001, ISBN 3-7945-2115-3.
- Lernen. Gehirnforschung und die Schule des Lebens., 2002, ISBN 9783827413963.
- Musik im Kopf: Hören, Musizieren, Verstehen und Erleben im neuronalen Netzwerk. 2002.
- Selbstbestimmen. Gehirnforschung und die Frage: Was sollen wir tun? 2004.
- Frontalhirn an Mandelkern. Letzte Meldungen aus der Nervenheilkunde. 2005.
- Vorsicht Bildschirm! Elektronische Medien, Gehirnentwicklung, Gesundheit und Gesellschaft. Klett, Stuttgart 2005, ISBN 3-12-010170-2.
- Gott-Gen und Grossmutterneuron. Geschichten von Gehirnforschung und Gesellschaft. 2006.
- Mozarts Geistesblitze. Wie unser Gehirn Musik verarbeitet. 2006.
- Vom Sinn des Lebens. Wege statt Werke. Schattauer, Stuttgart 2007, ISBN 978-3-7945-2563-8.
- Liebesbriefe und Einkaufszentren. Meditationen im und über den Kopf. Schattauer Verlag, 2008, ISBN 978-3-7945-2627-7.
- Medizin für die Bildung. Ein Weg aus der Krise. 2010, ISBN 978-3-8274-2677-2.
- Wie Kinder denken lernen 2010, ISBN 978-3-902533-26-5. (4 Hörbücher, 300 min.)
- Wie Erwachsene denken und lernen. 2011, ISBN 978-3-902533-38-8. (3 Hörbücher, 210 min.)
- Nichtstun, Flirten, Küssen und andere Leistungen des Gehirns. Schattauer Verlag, 2011, ISBN 978-3-7945-2856-1.
- Digitale Demenz. Wie wir uns und unsere Kinder um den Verstand bringen. Droemer Knaur, München 2012, ISBN 978-3-426-27603-7. (Rank #1 of Spiegel's bestseller list from August 27, 2012, to September 9, 2012)
- as publisher: Heinz Janisch, Carola Holland: Tom und der König der Tiere (= Leben Lernen. 1). 2012, ISBN 978-3-902533-43-2.
- as publisher: Heinz Janisch, Susanne Wechdorn: Mein Freund, der Rasenmäher (= Leben Lernen). 2012, ISBN 978-3-902533-45-6.
- Das (un)soziale Gehirn. Schattauer, Stuttgart 2013, ISBN 978-3-7945-2918-6.
- Rotkäppchen und der Stress. Schattauer, Stuttgart 2014, ISBN 978-3-7945-2977-3.
- Cyberkrank! Wie das digitalisierte Leben unsere Gesundheit ruiniert. Droemer, München 2015, ISBN 978-3-426-27608-2.
- Früher war alles später. Schattauer, Stuttgart 2017, ISBN 978-3-7945-3243-8.
- Einsamkeit. Die unerkannte Krankheit. Schmerzhaft. Ansteckend. Tödlich. Droemer, München 2018, ISBN 978-3-426-27676-1.
- Die Smartphone-Epidemie. Gefahren für Gesundheit, Bildung und Gesellschaft. Klett-Cotta, Stuttgart 2018, ISBN 978-3-608-96368-7.
