= Grotesco =

Swedish comedy group and series

Grotesco is the name of a Swedish comedy group and of a comedy television series on SVT. It aired between 2007 and 2017. The group also participated as break entertainment in Melodifestivalen 2009 ("The Melody Festival 2009"), a Swedish festival to determine the 49th song to represent Sweden in the Eurovision Song Contest, and released a CD with different variants of the hit song "Tingeling", which headlined in the break entertainment.

On 15 January 2015, they had the premiere for their first stage performance Grotesco på Scala – en näradödenrevy ("Grotesco at Scala – a near-death revue") in the Scala Theatre in Stockholm. On 3 September 2015, it was confirmed that Grotesco would do a third season of their TV series.

== History ==
The group was formed in the 1990s in Lidingö but took its current form and membership in 2006.

The pilot episode of the group’s TV series aired in 2006 on SVT as part of Humorlabbet, "The Humor Lab", a showcase of new Swedish humor where various comedy groups competed. Grotesco won the competition, and the prize was to have a full series of eight episodes produced. It began airing en October 2007 on SVT1.

In the spring of 2010 the second season was recorded under the direction of Michael Lindgren, and it was broadcast in November and December of 2010.

A complaint was made to police when the group performed Bögarnas Fel ("[It’s] The Gay’s Fault”) on Allsång på Skansen, a long-running sing-along program broadcast live from Skansen in Stockholm, but the Chancellor of Justice ruled that no crime had been committed and added that the song was clearly intended as satire. The song was also performed in the series' second season.

== Group members ==
- Henrik Dorsin
- Michael Lindgren
- Per Andersson
- Rikard Ulvshammar
- Per Gavatin
- Emma Molin
- Hanna Löfqvist Dorsin
- Emma Peters
- Jakob Setterberg
- Jonas Kahnlund
- Linus Eklund Adolphson
- Anna Vnuk
