= Jakob Setterberg =

Swedish actor, television presenter and comedian

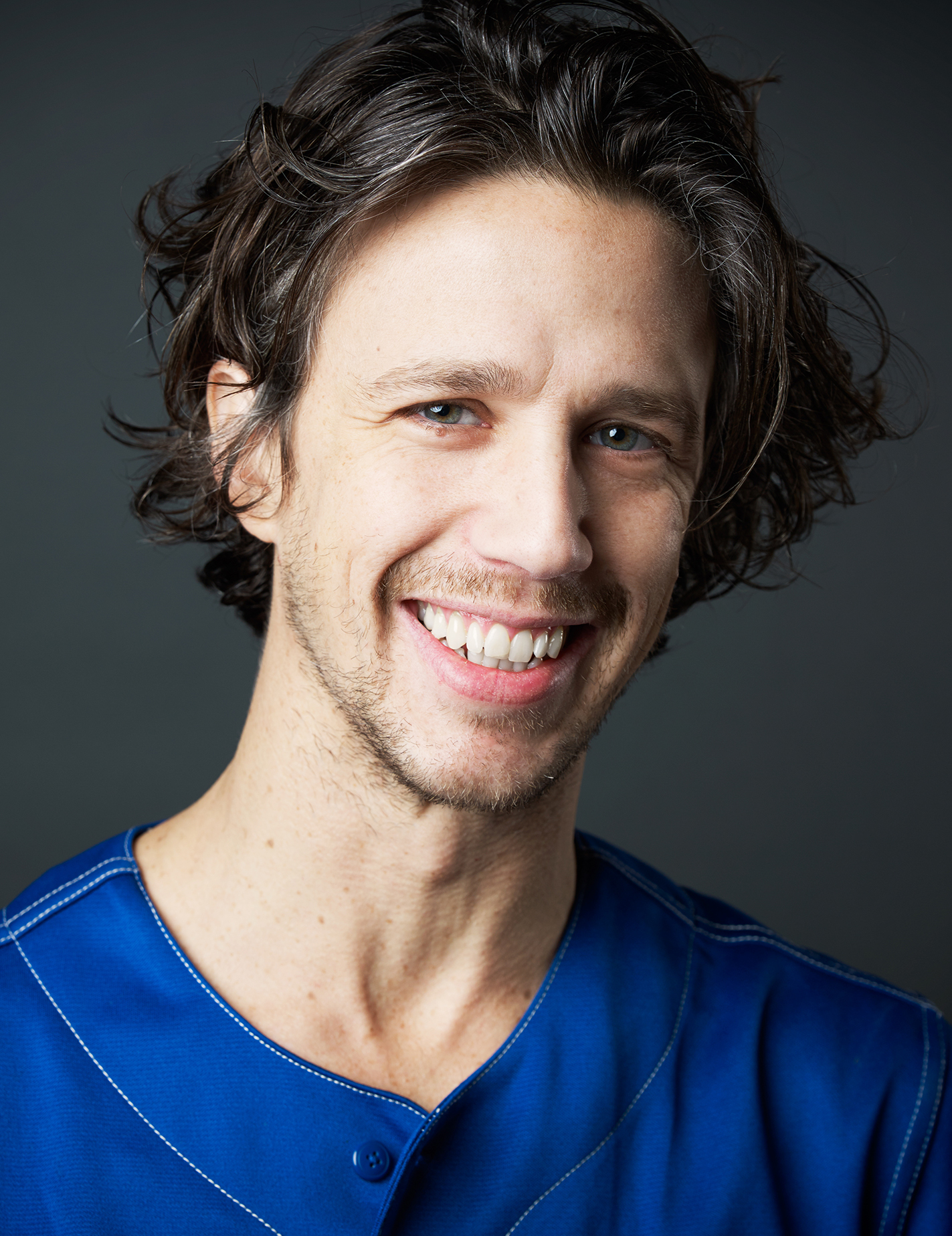
- Jakob Setterberg in 2014
- Born: Måns Jakob Setterberg; 22 July 1974 (age 51); Stockholm, Sweden
- Occupations: Actor, comedian, television presenter

Måns Jakob Setterberg (born 22 July 1974) is a Swedish actor, television presenter and comedian. He made his film debut in the Jan Troells film Ingenjör Andrées luftfärd in 1982. He is also a member of the comedy group Grotesco, he has also been part of the comedy show Partaj broadcast on Kanal5. Since 2010, Setterberg has presented the Vi i femman competition show on SVT.

He was married to Grotesco member Emma Molin, the couple divorced in 2020. They have two children together.
