= Andrea Bocelli 30: The Celebration =

2024 Italian concert series

- Genre: Musical
- Directed by: Sam Wrench
- Presented by: Michelle Hunziker
- Starring: Andrea Bocelli; Jon Batiste; José Carreras; Sofia Carson; Plácido Domingo; Elisa; Tiziano Ferro; Aida Garifullina; Giorgia; Lang Lang; Brian May; Christian Nodal; Laura Pausini; Eros Ramazzotti; Ed Sheeran; Nadine Sierra; Shania Twain; Bryn Terfel; Franco Vassallo; Zucchero
- Country of origin: Italy
- Original language: Italian
- No. of episodes: 2

Production
- Production company: RTI

Original release
- Network: Theatrical release (US)
- Release: 8 November 2024
- Network: Canale 5
- Release: 11 December 2024

Andrea Bocelli 30: The Celebration is an Italian musical entertainment television program featuring the concerts of the same name presented by Italian tenor Andrea Bocelli at the Teatro del Silenzio in Lajatico, Italy on 15, 17 and 19 July 2024. The program is hosted by Michelle Hunziker, and was broadcast in two parts on Canale 5 on 11 and 18 December 2024.

== Production ==
The Andrea Bocelli 30: The Celebration concerts were held on 15, 17 and 19 July 2024, at the Teatro del Silenzio in Lajatico, Italy. Filmed by director Sam Wrench, the events were later presented as a theatrical concert film in the United States and as a two-part television special in Italy. The TV presentation was produced by RTI.

Italian tenor Andrea Bocelli performed songs from his 30-year career, and was joined by several other musical guests for duets and solo performances. Guest performers included Jon Batiste, José Carreras, Sofia Carson, Plácido Domingo, Elisa, Tiziano Ferro, Aida Garifullina, Giorgia, Lang Lang, Brian May, Christian Nodal, Laura Pausini, Eros Ramazzotti, Ed Sheeran, Nadine Sierra, Shania Twain, Bryn Terfel, Franco Vassallo and Zucchero, as well as Russell Crowe, Johnny Depp and Will Smith.

== Release ==
A concert film directed by Sam Wrench premiered in US cinemas on 8 November 2024. An extended version, hosted by Michelle Hunziker, was broadcast in two parts on Canale 5 on 11 and 18 December 2024.

== Ratings ==
Episode	Airdate	Rating		
Episode	Airdate	Viewers	Share	Source
1	11 December 2024	2,492,000	16.44%	
2	18 December 2024	2,020,000	12.43%	
Media		2,256,000	14,43%	
