= Per Andersson (actor) =

Swedish actor and comedian (born 1976)

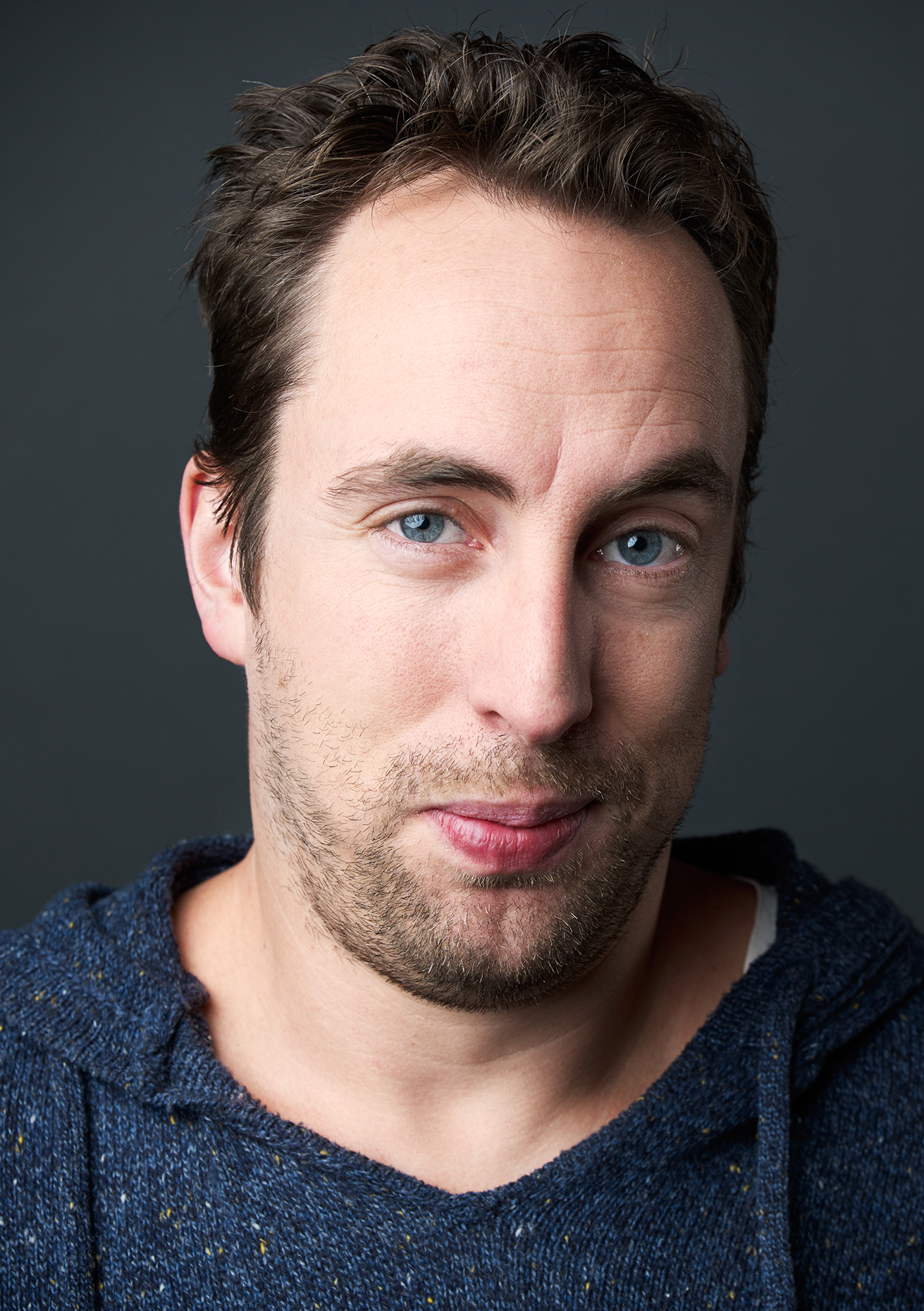
- Andersson in 2014
- Born: 1976 (age 49–50); Mölndal, Sweden
- Occupations: Actor; comedian; director

Per Andersson (born 1976) is a Swedish actor, comedian and director. He is one of the founders of the comedy group Grotesco. He has also been part of several of Sweden's best known television shows like Allsång på Skansen and Parlamentet.

== Biography ==
He was born in 1976 in Mölndal.

Andersson is one of the founders of the comedy group Grotesco who has had their own show on SVT. He has also appeared in shows like Parlamentet, Time Out, Allsång på Skansen and Lotta på Liseberg.

He has had roles in Rock of Ages production at Rondo and Chinateatern, as well as appearing in Diggiloo tour, La Cage aux folles at Oscarsteatern and Zpanska flugan at Chinateatern. He also directed his self written Dixie Comedy Cabaret.

He was awarded the Karamelodiktstipendiet in 2016.

Andersson has also done dubbing work as Art in Monsters University and Fear in the film Inside Out. Per Andersson has had roles in films like Bröderna Karlsson and I rymden finns inga känslor. In 2019, Andersson had a leading role as Santa in Sveriges Television's Christmas calendar, Panik i tomteverkstan, opposite Pernilla Wahlgren.

In the winter of 2020, Andersson and Måns Zelmerlöw did a Christmas show together called Tomten och Bocken - En slags julshow at Hamburger Börs directed by Edward af Sillén, but because of the COVID-19 pandemic only a few days of the show was able to be done before it had to be cancelled.
