= Storm på Lugna gatan =

- Country of origin: Sweden
- Original language: Swedish

Original release
- Network: SVT
- Release: 1 December – 24 December 2018

Related
- Jakten på tidskristallen (2017); Panik i tomteverkstan (2019)

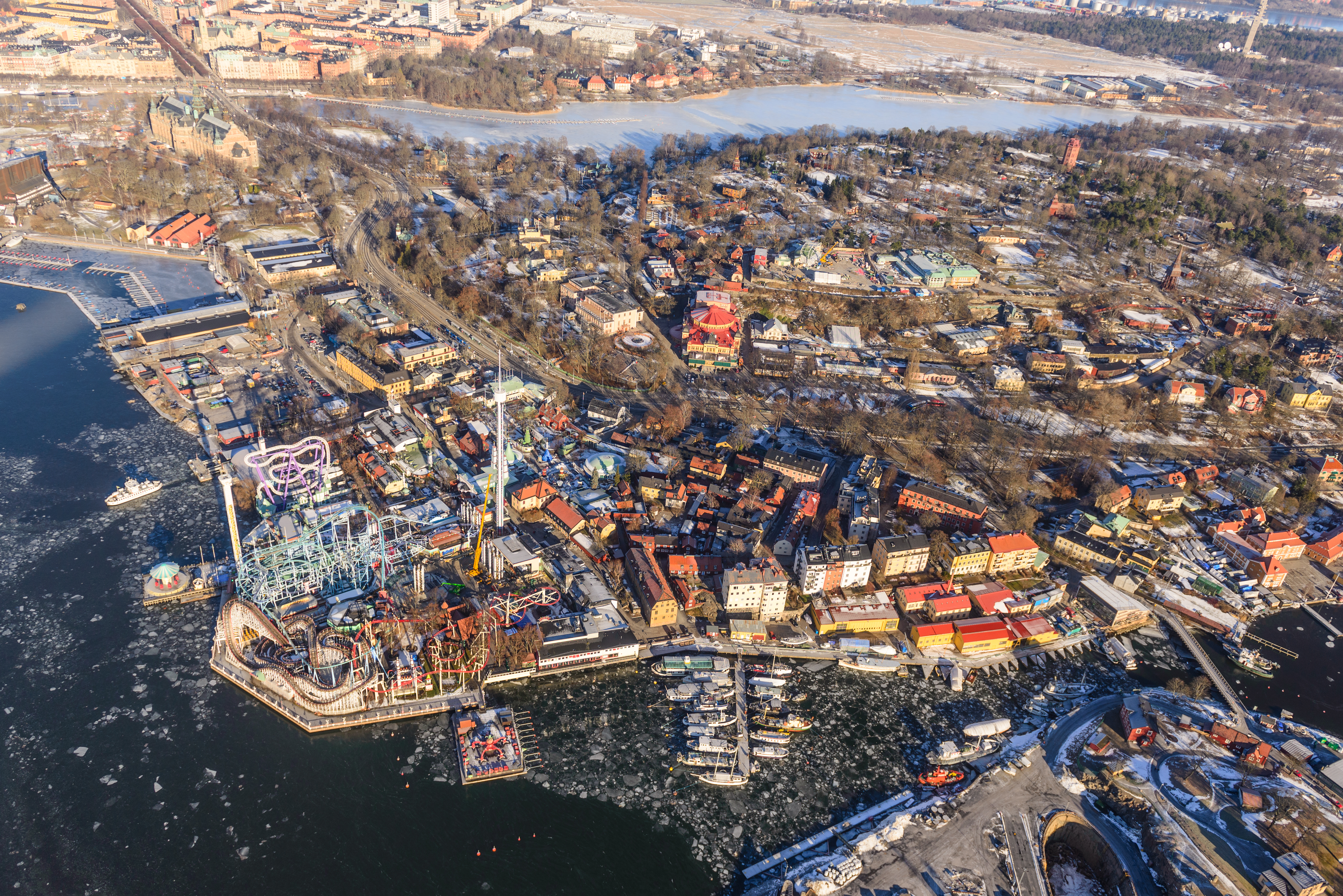
Djurgårdsstaden was one of the filming locations

Storm på Lugna gatan is the SVT Christmas Calendar for 2018.

== Cast ==
- Adrian Macéus – Leo
- Maja Söderström – Vilja
- Cecilia Forss – Sanna
- Henrik Johansson – Trond
- Wilma Lidén – Evin
- Johan Rheborg – Eskil
- Linus Wahlgren – Sten
- Shima Niavarani – Mika
- Sofia Ledarp – Malva
- Ulla Skoog – Gudrun
- Olof Wretling – Sven
- Lena Philipsson – Lussan
- Edvin Ryding – Sylvester
- Eric Stern – Simon
- Happy Jankell – Freja
- Christoffer Holmberg – Hembot
