= Maja Söderström =

Swedish actress (born 2011)

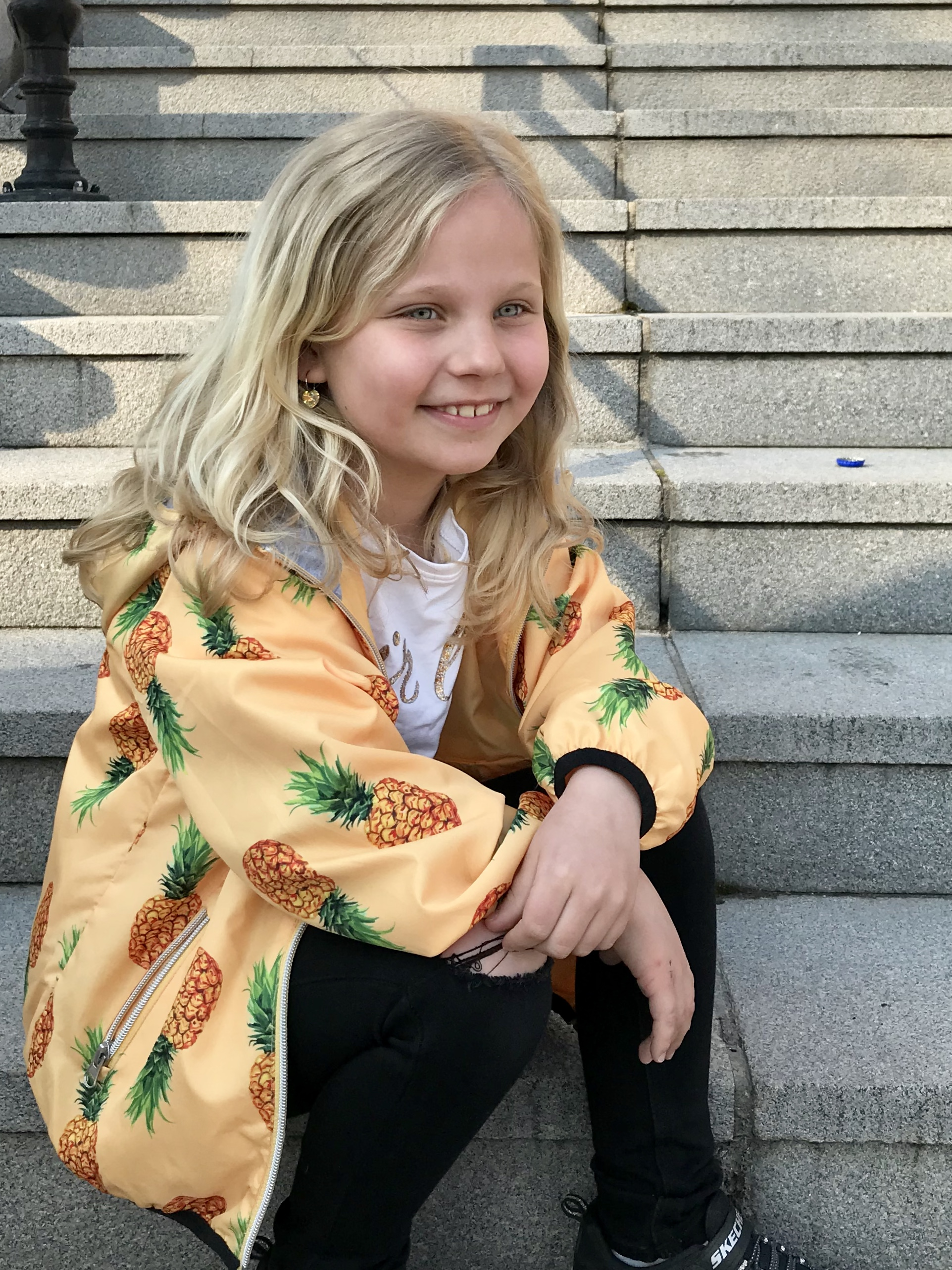
- Maja Söderström (2019)
- Born: 19 September 2011 (age 14)
- Occupation: Actress
- Years active: 2018–present
- Known for: "Storm på Lugna gatan"

Maja Söderström is a Swedish child actress. She had a leading role in the 2018 SVT Christmas calendar "Storm på Lugna gatan" with the role as "Vilja" in the family Storm. Söderström also participated in the UNICEF-gala which was broadcast on TV4 on 1 May 2019. Currently, she is the Swedish dubber for Elinor in Elinor Wonders Why.
