= Michael Lindgren =

Swedish actor, producer, and writer

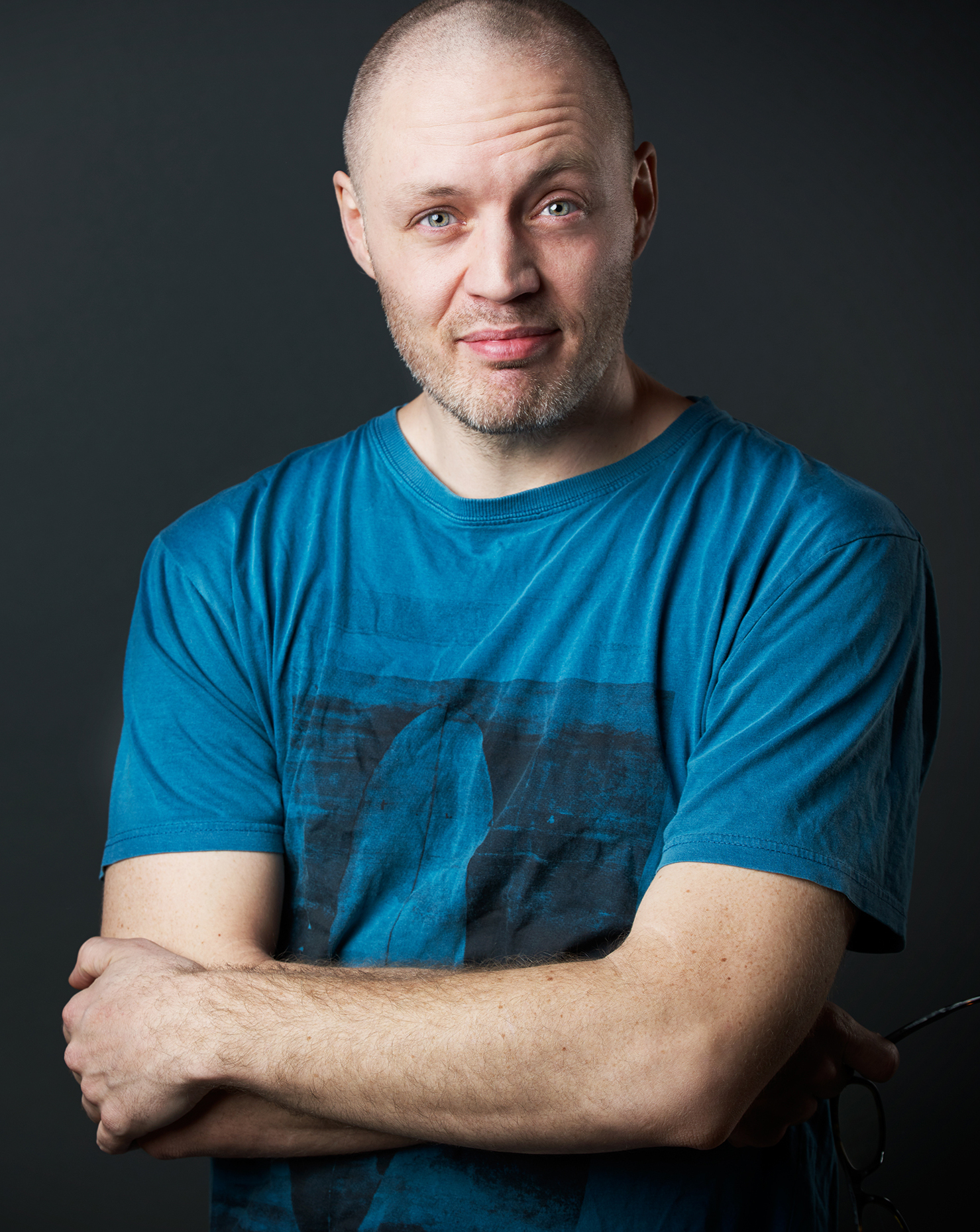
Portrait of Michael Lindgren

DJ Trexx is a pseudonym of Swedish actor, producer and writer Michael Lindgren (born 14 March 1978 in Stockholm), who is a part of the Grotesco comedy collective. DJ Trexx is a satirical figure who was initially portrayed as a Croatian disc jockey who performs kitschy eurotechno songs, but has also at times appeared to be Russian. In the finals of Melodifestivalen 2009, DJ Trexx performed a version of the song "Tingeling", which had been a recurring theme of several comical between-acts performed by the Grotesco team in that year's episodes of Melodifestivalen. The song "Tingaliin", the Russian version of "Tingeling" was released as a single and hit number one on Sverigetopplistan in March 2009.

DJ Trexx was also commissioned for the song A Union of Peace Love and Bass to encourage young voters to vote in the 2009 European Parliament election.

He had a supporting role in the film Beyond Dreams (2017).

In 2021, he appeared as part of sketch in the Andra Chansen round of Swedish Eurovision selection Melodifestivalen.
