= Emma Peters =

Swedish actress (born 1978)

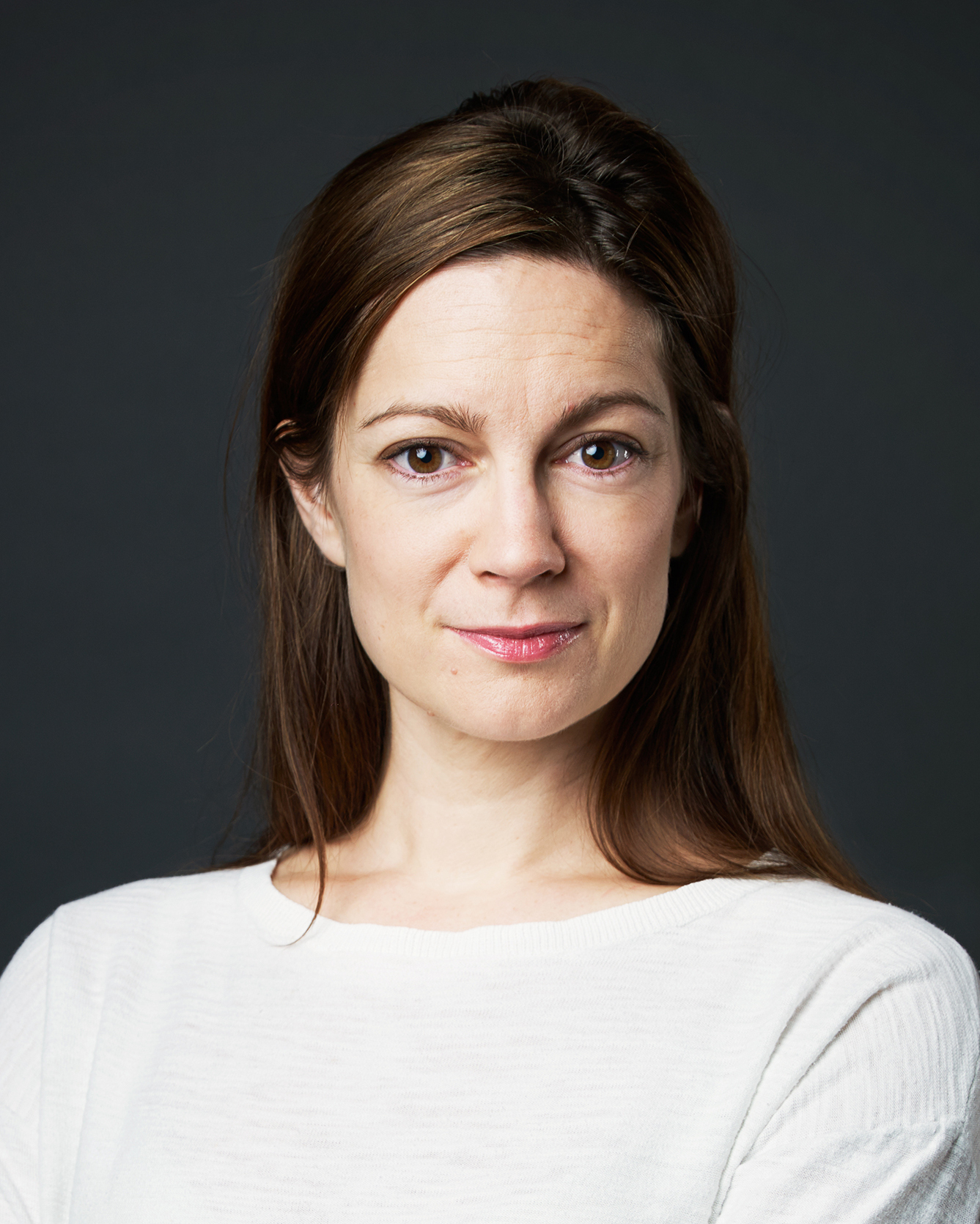
- Peters in 2014
- Born: Emma Karin Peters; 10 February 1978 (age 48); Täby, Sweden
- Occupation: Actress

Emma Karin Peters (born 10 February 1978) is a Swedish actress and comedian. She studied at the Teaterhögskolan in Stockholm between 2000 and 2004. She has worked as an actress at Backa teater, Östgötateatern, Uppsala stadsteater and toured with the Royal Dramatic Theatre and the National Swedish Touring Theatre.

Peters is one of the members of the comedy group Grotesco.

She has acted in TV shows like Vita lögner, Krama mig, Boy Machine, and Gustafsson 3 tr.

In 2023, she acted in the ad campaign "Sweden (not Switzerland)."
