= Hanna Dorsin =

Swedish actress and comedian (born 1973)

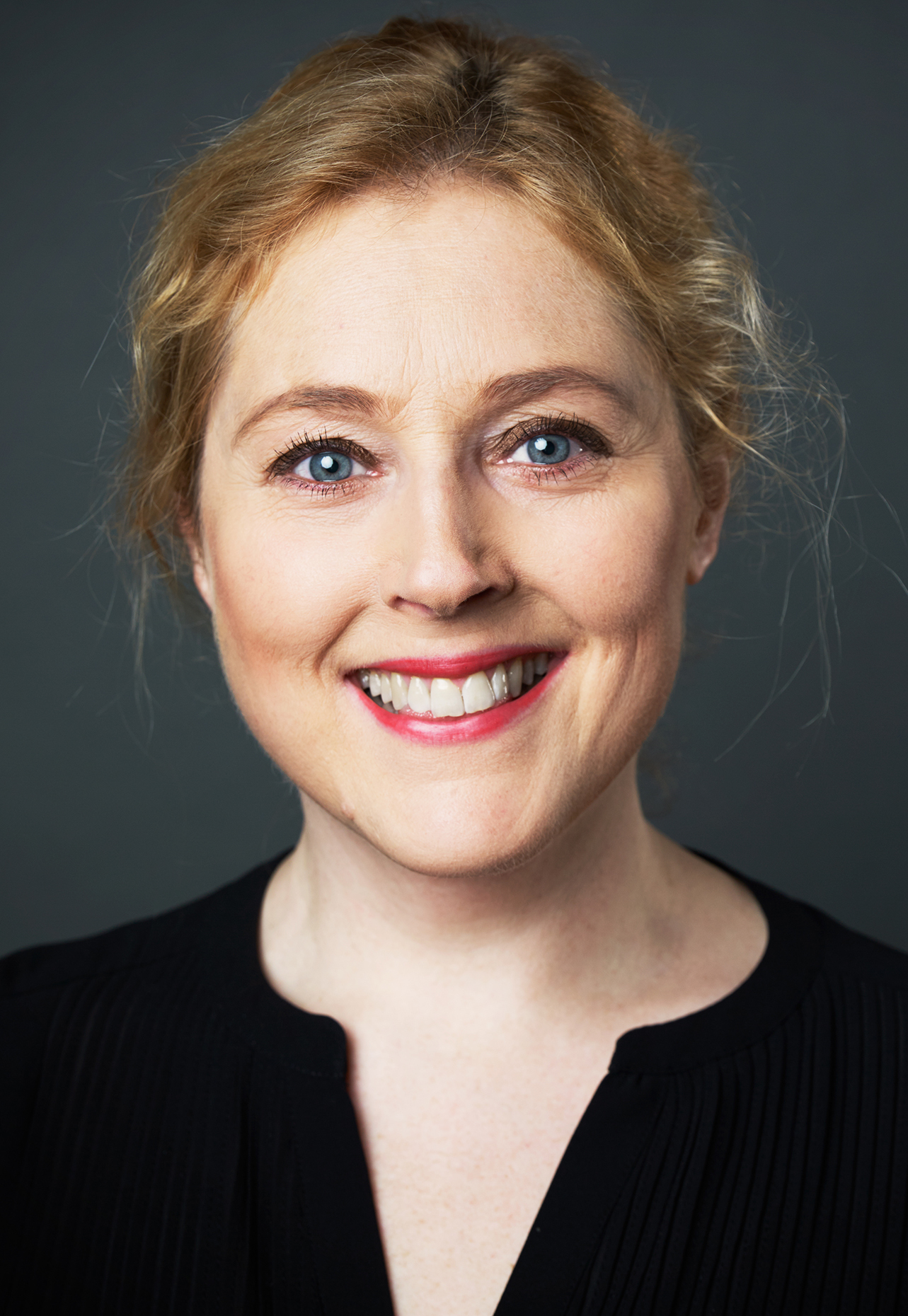
- Dorsin in 2014
- Born: Hanna Margareta Löfqvist; 7 March 1973 (age 53); Uppsala, Sweden
- Occupations: Actress; comedian
- Spouse: Henrik Dorsin (m. 2008)
- Children: 2

Hanna Margareta Dorsin (born 7 March 1973) is a Swedish actress and comedian. Dorsin studied acting as Teaterhögskolan in Stockholm between 1999 and 2003. Since 2014, she is part of the comedy group Grotesco.

She was born on 7 March 1973 in Uppsala.

She married comedian Henrik Dorsin in 2008. They have two sons.

== Filmography ==
- 2001 – En sång för Martin
- 2007–2017 – Grotesco (TV series)
- 2009 – Behandlingen
- 2011 – Åsa-Nisse – wälkom to Knohult
- 2011 – Gustafsson 3 tr (TV series)
- 2017 – Grotescos sju mästerverk (TV series)
- 2018 – Helt perfekt (TV series)
- 2018–2020 – På spåret (TV series)
- 2019 – Förfärliga snömannen
- 2019 – She-Ra och prinsessrebellerna (TV series)
- 2019 – Ture Sventon och Bermudatriangelns hemlighet (TV series)
- 2020 – The Sandhamn Murders (TV series)
