= Henrik Dorsin =

Swedish actor

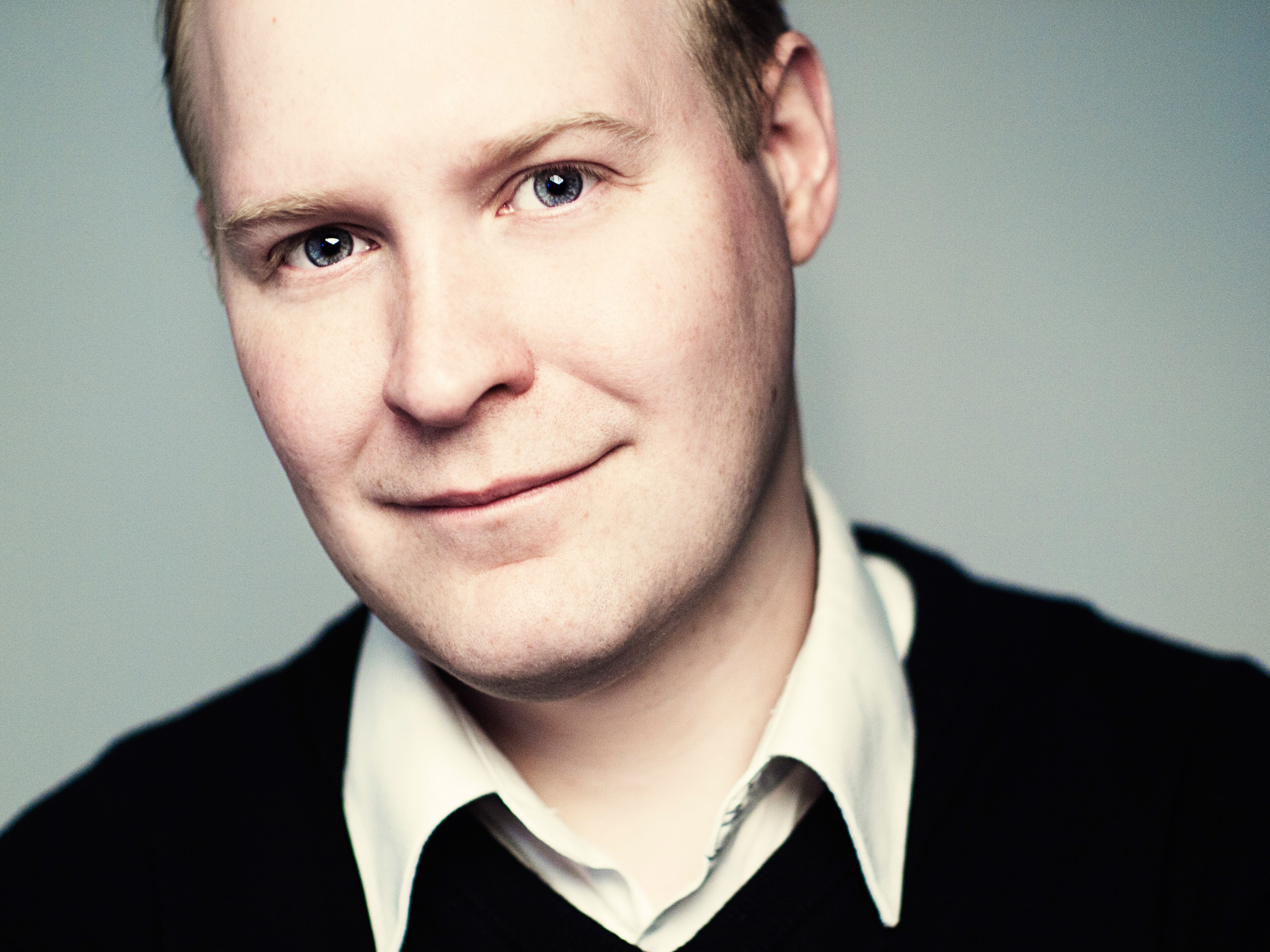
- Dorsin in 2014
- Born: 20 November 1977 (age 48); Lidingö, Sweden
- Occupations: Comedian, actor
- Spouse: Hanna Dorsin

Per Henrik Dorsin (born 20 November 1977) is a Swedish actor, comedian, singer and revue-artist.

== Early life ==
Dorsin's grandfather immigrated from Poland to Sweden after World War 2 and in the 1950s the family changed their name from Dziewior to Dorsin as it was difficult for Swedes to pronounce. Dorsin grew up in the Stockholm suburb Lidingö.

Dorsin's younger brother is former football player Mikael Dorsin.

== Career ==
Dorsin started his career as an extra in the 1996 film Vinterviken. He started his television career in the satire show Detta har hänt in 1998. He then worked as a revue-artist and dramatist, he produced the revue Slängar av sleven, and has participated in shows with the theatre group Stockholms blodbad. Dorsin is one of the founding members of the comedy group Grotesco. He also worked with the SVT entertainment show Säpop, and he has been part of the TV4 comedy show Parlamentet.

In 2007, he won the Karamelodiktstipendiet by Povel Ramel. In 2014, Dorsin toured with the comedy play Henrik Dorsin – näktergalen från Holavedsvägen.

And since 2014, Dorsin runs the theater Scalateatern in Stockholm. In 2022, Dorsin played the role of Jarmo Björkman in Ruben Östlund's film Triangle of Sadness that won the Palme d'Or at the Cannes Film Festival. He portrayed Thomas in Cry Wolf (2024). In 2025, Dorsin was awarded 500.000 (SEK) by the Natur & Kulturs kulturpris for his work in the field of culture.

In 2025, Henrik Dorsin is doing the Svenska revyn a revue show, firstly along with Vanna Rosenberg and Johan Ulveson, he will in late in 2025 be joined by comedian Johan Glans as well.

== Personal life ==
He is married to comedian Hanna Dorsin.
