= Petra Mede =

Swedish TV presenter (born 1970)

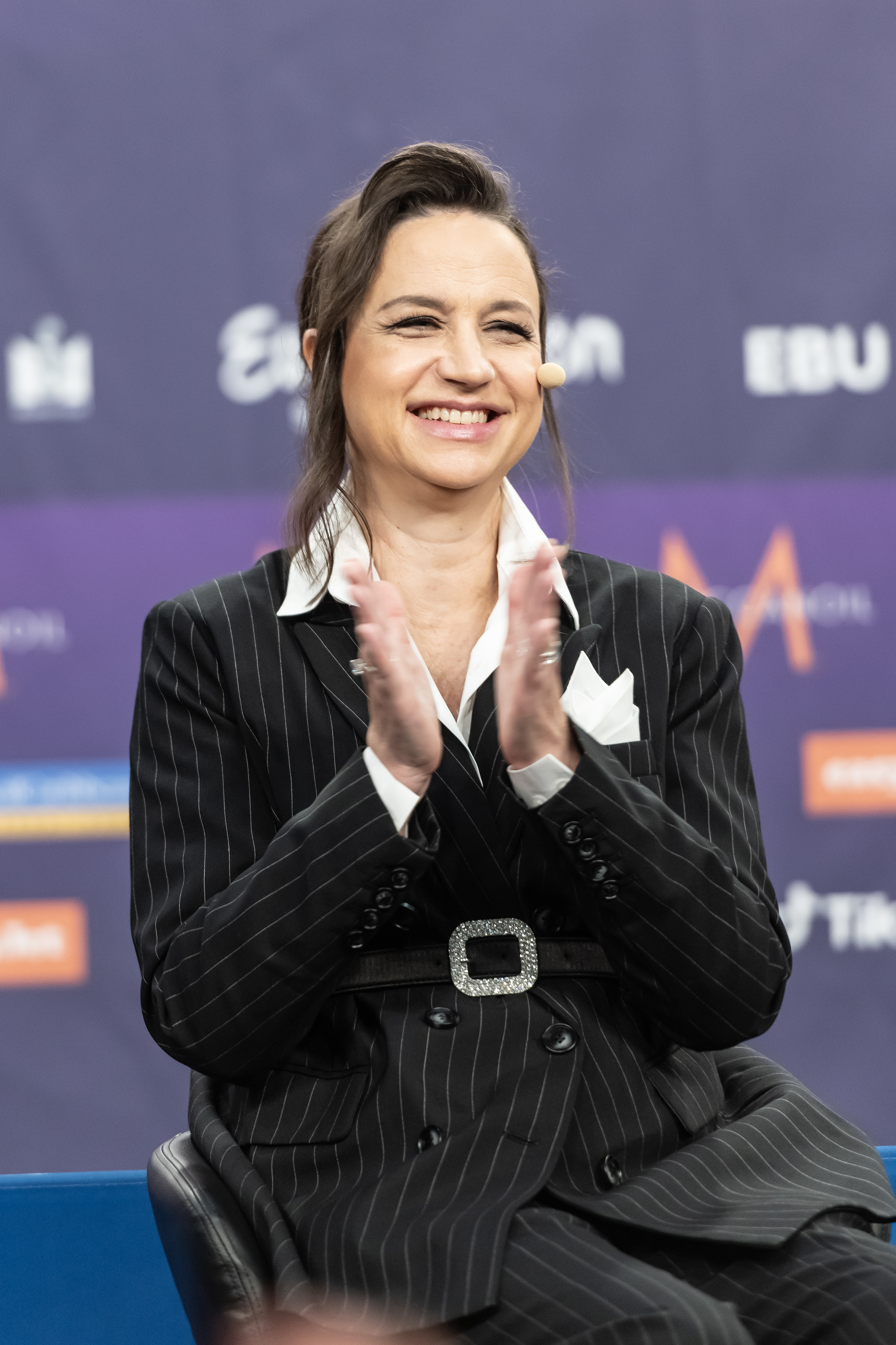
- Mede in 2024
- Born: Petra Maria Mede; 7 March 1970 (age 56); Stockholm, Sweden
- Occupations: Television presenter, comedian
- Years active: 2005–present
- Known for: Hosting Melodifestivalen in 2009, 2016 and the Eurovision Song Contest in 2013, 2016 and 2024
- Partner: Mattias Günther (separated)
- Children: 2
- Parent(s): Klas Mede (father); Ulla Mede (mother)
- Website: www.petramede.se

Petra Maria Mede (pronounced [ˈpêːtra ˈmêːdɛ]; born 7 March 1970) is a Swedish comedian, dancer, actress and television presenter. She is known for her several roles in comic shows and as a television presenter, and is best known outside of Sweden for hosting the Eurovision Song Contest in 2013, 2016, and 2024, and appearing as a guest performer in 2025.

== Early life ==
Petra Maria Mede was born in Stockholm to Ulla Elisabet (née Linnander; born 1940) and entrepreneur Klas Håkan Mede (born 1939), and raised in Partille, near Gothenburg. She has a younger sister named Anne Mede Ageling. She graduated in Philosophy as well as in the French language.

== Career ==
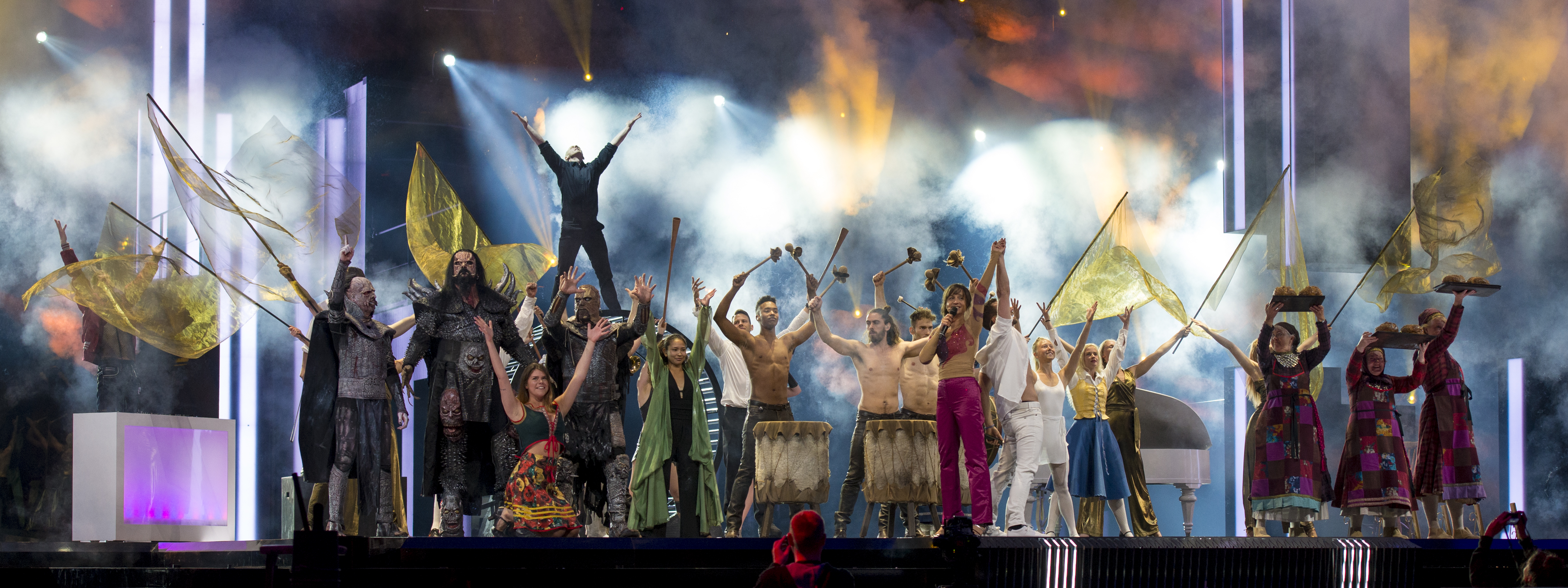
Mede and Måns Zelmerlöw (center right) performing the interval act "Love Love Peace Peace" in the final of the Eurovision Song Contest 2016.

Mede started off as a dancer at Balettakademien, but her career was cut short by a back injury at the age of 20. She worked as a tourist guide in Stockholm before moving to comedy aged around 35, taking part in a contest for emerging comedians in 2005.

Mede began being seen on television, appearing on Extra! Extra!, Dubbat, Musikmaskinen, Parlamentet and Morgonsoffan. She received an award for best emerging actress in 2007. In 2008, she and Anna Maria Granath wrote the parody book Mer självkänsla än du kan hantera (More Self-Esteem than You Can Handle). She participated in the TV shows Stockholm Live and Babben & Co.

She appeared in Melodifestivalen 2008 to announce the points from Sundsvall. She hosted Melodifestivalen 2009, where the Swedish entry for the Eurovision Song Contest 2009 was chosen and was voted Sweden's best female comedian the same year. In 2010, she hosted her own program, titled Petra Mede Show, on TV3.

Mede has regularly worked for SVT since 2011, hosting Julvärd, the broadcaster's Christmas Eve special, in 2013, and the Guldbagge Awards in 2011, 2012, 2015, 2016, 2017 and 2018.

In May 2013, Mede hosted the Eurovision Song Contest 2013 in Malmö, additionally performing an interval act during the final; her hosting was widely acclaimed by critics and journalists around Europe. She was the first solo Eurovision presenter in nearly 20 years, after Mary Kennedy in 1995 and the first solo presenter for a contest with semi-finals, only being accompanied by Eric Saade as green room host in the final.

Mede made her film debut in 2014 in Medicinen.

In 2015, Mede, along with Graham Norton, hosted the Eurovision's Greatest Hits EBU/BBC 60th anniversary concert show recorded on 31 March at the Eventim Apollo, in Hammersmith, London and was later broadcast in 27 countries.

Mede dubbed Destiny in the Swedish version of the 2016 film Finding Dory. She co-hosted the first heat of Melodifestivalen 2016 with Gina Dirawi at the Scandinavium in Gothenburg. Mede then hosted the Eurovision Song Contest 2016 in Stockholm alongside previous year's winner Måns Zelmerlöw, joining Katie Boyle and Jacqueline Joubert as the only people to have hosted the contest more than once.

Mede played the role of Katja in the 2017 Netflix series Bonus Family and made an appearance in the 2019 documentary film Hasse & Tage – En kärlekshistoria.

Between 2018 and 2020, Mede hosted reality TV show Stjärnornas stjärna. In 2021 and 2022, she co-hosted Let's Dance alongside David Lindgren. She has since been the presenter of Hjulet on TV4.

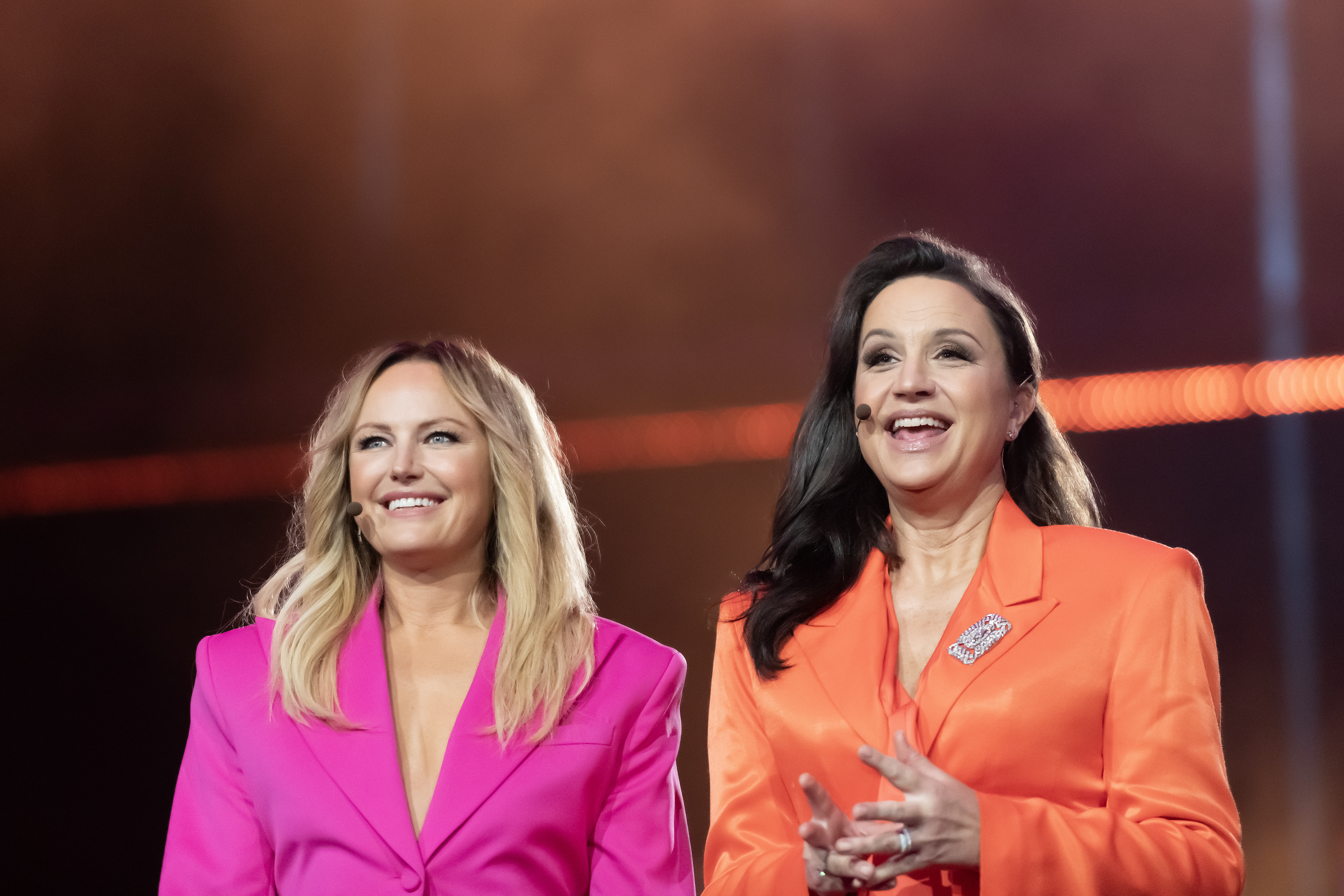
Malin Åkerman and Mede at the Eurovision Song Contest 2024

Mede hosted the Eurovision Song Contest 2024 in Malmö, with Malin Åkerman.

In 2025, she was an interval performer in the final of Melodifestivalen 2025 and later in the first semi-final of the Eurovision Song Contest 2025 (guest appearing in the musical number "Made in Switzerland"). She also co-commentated the Eurovision final for SVT.

== Personal life ==
Mede is a polyglot, speaking Swedish, English, Spanish, Italian and French. Together with her former partner Mattias Günther, she has a daughter born in 2012. However, in 2015, it was confirmed that she and Günther had split. In 2022, she had another child.

As of March 2024, Mede resides in Bromma, Stockholm.

== Filmography ==
=== Television ===
Year	Title	Role	Notes
2007	Stockholm Live	Presenter	
2007–2008	Extra! Extra!		
2007–2009	Parlamentet	Team member	
2008	Dubbat		
2008	Hjälp!		
2008	Morgonsoffan		
2008	Det sociala spelet		
2008	Musikmaskinen		
2009	Melodifestivalen 2009	Presenter	Final
2009	Snillen snackar		
2009	Roast på Berns		
2010	Cirkus Möller		
2010	Petra Mede Show	Presenter	
2010	Välkommen åter		
2011	46th Guldbagge Awards	Presenter	
2011	Maestro	Participant	Swedish version of Maestro
2012	47th Guldbagge Awards	Presenter	
2013	Maestro	Presenter	
2013	Eurovision Song Contest 2013	Presenter	
2014	Kristallen	Presenter	
2015	50th Guldbagge Awards	Presenter	
2015	En clown till kaffet		
2015	Eurovision Song Contest's Greatest Hits	Co-presenter	with Graham Norton
2016	51st Guldbagge Awards	Presenter	
2016	Melodifestivalen 2016	Presenter	Heat 1
2016	Eurovision Song Contest 2016	Co-presenter	with Måns Zelmerlöw
2017	52nd Guldbagge Awards	Presenter	
2017–2019	Bonus Family	Katja	
2018	53rd Guldbagge Awards	Presenter	
2018–2020	Stjärnornas stjärna	Presenter	
2021–2022	Let's Dance	Co-presenter	Seasons 16 and 17, with David Lindgren
2022	Hjulet	Presenter	Swedish version of The Wheel
2024	Eurovision Song Contest 2024	Co-presenter	with Malin Åkerman
2025	Melodifestivalen 2025	Interval act performer	Final
2025	Eurovision Song Contest 2025	Interval act performer	First semi-final ("Made in Switzerland")
2025	Eurovision Song Contest 2025	Co-commentator	Final, with Edward af Sillén for SVT

=== Film ===
- Medicinen (2014)
