= Screwed in Tallinn =

1999 Swedish TV film directed by Tomas Alfredson

- Swedish DVD cover
- Also known as: Torsk på Tallinn
- Written by: Robert Gustafsson; Jonas Inde; Andres Lokko; Martin Luuk; Johan Rheborg; Henrik Schyffert
- Directed by: Tomas Alfredson
- Starring: Robert Gustafsson; Johan Rheborg; Jonas Inde
- Country of origin: Sweden
- Original language: Swedish

Production
- Producer: Iréne Tostar
- Cinematography: Leif Benjour
- Running time: 60 minutes
- Production company: Sveriges Television

Original release
- Network: SVT1
- Release: 22 April 1999

Screwed in Tallinn (Swedish: Torsk på Tallinn) is a 1999 Swedish comedy-drama film written by and starring the comedy group Killinggänget, and directed by their member Tomas Alfredson. Made in a mockumentary style, it revolves around a group of Swedish single men who travel by bus to Estonia where they have been promised they will meet Estonian women.

The film was one of four 60-minute films Killinggänget produced for Sveriges Television in 1999 under the label Fyra små filmer ("Four small films"). It received the Golden Gate Award for best television comedy at the 2000 San Francisco International Film Festival.

== Plot ==
Unsuccessful entrepreneur Percy Nilegård organizes a bus trip for lonely Swedish men to Estonia, where Nilegård's Estonian business partner Lembit Metsik has gathered Estonian women interested in meeting Swedish men. The group comprises a mixture of men from different parts of Sweden: Roland Järverup, a timid dansband fan from Karlskoga, the easy-going pick-up artists Micke and Slobodan from Skövde, who have grown tired of the local women, Magnus Ronell, a socially awkward and aggressive perpetual student, Lennart Sundström, an idealistic and argumentative sanitary worker who lives with his elderly mother in Vännäs, and several others. The bus is driven by Lasse Kongo, a severely alcoholic man with unintelligible speech.

Once the group arrive in Paldiski, in the vicinity of Tallinn, a speed-dating system is put into practice, followed by dancing later at night. Awkward and tragicomic situations occur as most of the characters fail to connect with each other and behave properly. Eventually, after various achievements or non-achievements, the men reenter the bus and return to Sweden.

== Cast ==
- Robert Gustafsson as Roland Järverup, Jan Banan, Micke and Lasse Kongo
- Johan Rheborg as Percy Nilegård and Magnus Ronell
- Jonas Inde as Lennart Sundström
- Tõnu Kark as Lembit Metsik
- Lena Söderblom as Lennart's mother
- Birgit Lilienthal as Luule
- Merle Palmiste as Svetlana Metsik
- Tiina Tauraite as Eda

== Production ==
Screwed in Tallinn was produced by the Swedish public broadcaster Sveriges Television (SVT), as one of four 60-minute television films written by and starring the comedy group Killinggänget. SVT had already produced all of the group's previous works, such as the series I manegen med Glenn Killing and NileCity 105,6. Made under the collective title Fyra små filmer ("Four small films"), these productions marked the group's first collaboration with director Tomas Alfredson, who replaced Walter Söderlund and since then has been considered a permanent member.

While filming the scenes set at the dance and conference hall, single takes could be 30 to 40 minutes long, in mass scenes where all actors participated; those in focus followed the script, while others improvised in case they were within the frame in the background. The first raw cut of the film was two and a half hours long, and for a while the filmmakers considered releasing a longer version than originally commissioned. Many of the most tragic scenes did not make it to the final edit, including a scene where Lennart witnesses his father hanging himself.

The film's original Swedish title, Torsk på Tallinn, contains a double entendre. Properly translated, it means "Sucker for Tallinn", but torsk is also a Swedish slang term for a man who solicits the service of prostitutes.

== Release ==
The film premiered on SVT1 on 22 April 1999. A Swedish DVD was released on 28 March 2003. In a review of Killinggänget's 2004 feature film Four Shades of Brown, Svenska Dagbladet's critic referred to Screwed in Tallinn as the group's masterpiece, "both satirical and heartbreaking at the same time."
