= Robert Gustafsson =

Swedish comedian and actor (born 1964)

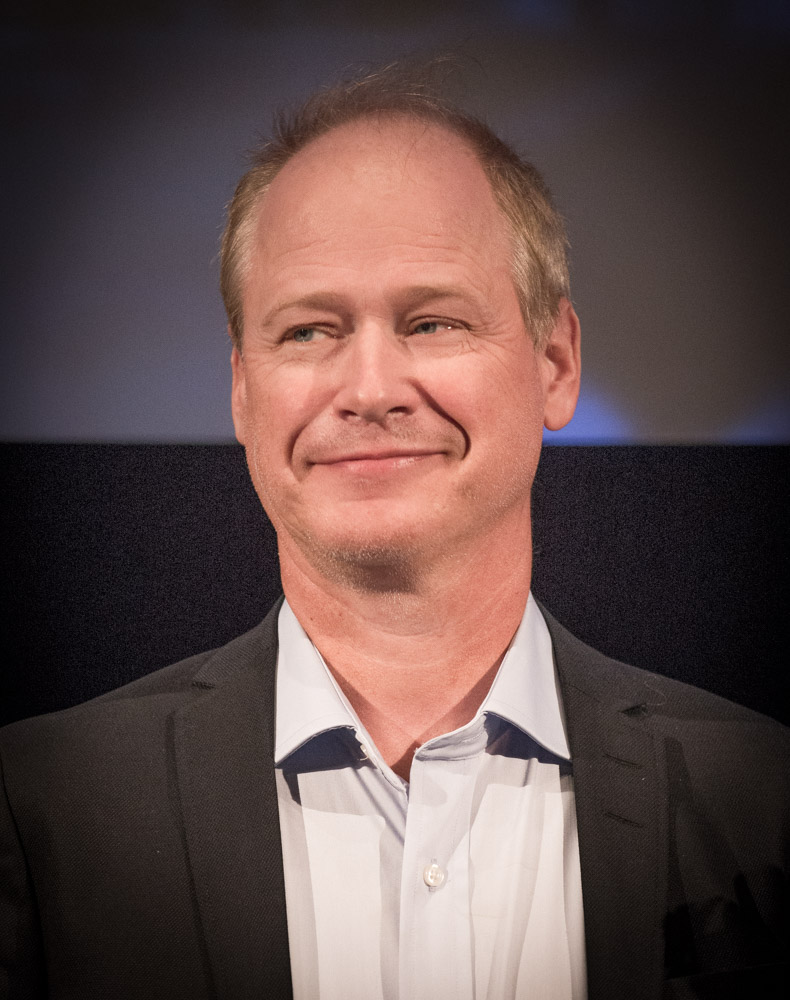
- Gustafsson in 2015
- Born: Carl Robert Olof Gustafsson; 20 December 1964 (age 61); Katrineholm, Sweden
- Education: Academy of Music and Drama, University of Gothenburg (1990)
- Occupations: Actor; comedian; screenwriter; singer
- Years active: 1985–present
- Notable work: Four Shades of Brown (2004); The Hundred-Year-Old Man Who Climbed Out of the Window and Disappeared (2013); The Truth Will Out (2018–2021); The Unlikely Murderer (2021)
- Awards: Guldbagge Award for Best Actor in a Leading Role (2004); Kristallen for Actor of the year (2019)
- Honours: H. M. The King's Medal 8th size gold (2015)
- Website: robertgustafsson.se

Carl Robert Olof Gustafsson (born 20 December 1964) is a Swedish actor, comedian, screenwriter, singer and member of Killinggänget. He is occasionally referred to as the funniest man in Sweden.

== Early life and education ==
Carl Robert Olof Gustafsson was born on 20 December 1964 in Katrineholm, to upholsterer and furniture salesman Olof Gustafsson (1930–2020) and housewife Inger Gustafsson (née Vilhelmsson) (1932–2022). Robert had an older brother, Kristian (1961–2004), and the family lived in Katrineholm until Robert was six years old. When Robert's maternal grandfather, Wilhelm, passed away in 1970, the family relocated to his house in Skövde, where Robert would grow up. The town is situated between Sweden's two largest lakes, Vänern and Vättern, in central southern Sweden, 134 km northeast of Gothenburg.

Gustafsson first attended Käpplundaskolan (grades 1–6) in Havstena, where he befriended Niclas Jensen in the third grade. The duo later attended Helenaskolan (grades 7–9) in central Skövde. The students had much influence over one particular school period on Thursdays, when they were allowed to entertain each other or participate in various group activities. This 40-minute period was soon named 'Robert & Niclas', as Gustafsson and Jensen were dedicated in their preparations of funny sketches for these occasions. In a 2001 interview with Aftonbladet, Gustafsson recalled, "I was a fanatic television viewer. Free periods were spent reenacting episodes of Kojak, Alias Smith and Jones, and Monty Python.

The duo also used Jensen's Super 8 camera to record amateur films, including the short Tur i oturen med tur och retur. Among other films were a Benny Hill-inspired production about a bicycle-mounted police officer, who rams into pedestrians on his way through town, and another about a mummy that ravages a public restroom. In sixth grade, Gustafsson and Jensen decided to create a show for the class trip and quickly became known throughout the school for their celebrated revues in the assembly. They were subsequently invited to perform at other schools in the area.

Eventually the show grew so popular that the municipal Culture and Leisure Committee provided a tour bus so that Gustafsson and Jensen could perform all over Skövde. They were even allowed to put on shows at the City Theatre, located in Skövde Kulturhus (civic cultural centre). In a 2004 interview with Aftonbladet, Gustafsson recalled, "We were local celebrities and 13 years old. Then, when the local radio station started up, we waited outside until they gave us our own show. Lotta Bromé was just like us. We used to sit together in the archive and search for records, but for different shows. We were obsessed."

In 1978, shortly after the local radio station, P4 Skaraborg, started up, Gustafsson and Jensen got their own humour show, called 'Mick', and became Sweden's youngest radio producers. They did other shows as well, mostly parodies. Gustafsson received a set of keys that allowed him and Jensen access to most of the Kulturhuset premises, including the City Theatre, the radio station, two television studios, an art hall, a photo lab and the City Library. They could come and go as they pleased.

During the time he spent at the City Theatre, Gustafsson had gotten to know actor and comedian Runo Sundberg, who offered him a job as a prompter. The following year, at age 14, he made his first stage performance in front of a paying audience in Skaraborgsrevyn, which was led by Sundberg and revue actor Rolf 'Rulle' Lövgren. In a 2004 interview with Aftonbladet, Gustafsson recalled, "I've grown up in a small town where there were maybe four doors that read 'opportunity'. But those doors stood open, and there were people inside who were interested."

Gustafsson was also an avid cyclist and competed in road racing from 1975 to 1981, with training sessions of 140 kilometres, 4–5 times per week. His father, Olof, won the Swedish championships in the masters category 'Old Boys' two years in a row, 1973–74. Robert was rarely at school, though, and completed the compulsory education (grades 1–9) with a moderate 3.2 average (out of a maximum 5.0). Gustafsson proceeded to attend a two-year upper secondary education in Skövde, studying electrical engineering, with the ambition to become an audio engineer.

After graduation he completed eleven months of mandatory military service as a squad leader at the Skaraborg regiment and then worked with business presentations. In a 2011 interview with Svenska Dagbladet, Gustafsson recalled, "Yes, I worked as an audio engineer at a film company in Skövde that did business presentations. Alfa Laval were to have a 35 mm slide presentation of their new septic tank for cow dung. Slide one was a close-up of a cow's arse with dung coming out of it, and I was to add the music of Peterson-Berger's 'Intåg i sommarhagen'. I pressed stop, told them I quit, packed my bags, went to Stockholm and started taking acting classes."

At 19 years old, Gustafsson moved to Stockholm, where he worked as a caretaker during the day and took acting classes at the private school Teaterverkstaden, located at Folkuniversitetet, in the evening. He met his future wife, Charlotte, in 1985, during the theatrical production Kungen är naken (The Emperor's New Clothes). He played the main role, and she was tasked with drawing the seams of an imaginary suit on his naked body, using an eyeliner pencil. In 1986 Gustafsson aspired to attend the Stockholm Academy of Dramatic Arts, but his application was rejected. He subsequently applied to and earned admission at the Academy of Music and Drama in Gothenburg.

Having moved to Gothenburg, Gustafsson applied for a job at Sveriges Television, as he didn't want to take a student loan. He managed to get cast as 'Robert' on the popular children's television series Björnes magasin. While attending the academy, he wrote his own scripts for the show and recorded episodes on Fridays and Saturdays. He rented apartments in Gothenburg second-hand and kept his clothes in bags as he jumped between short-term contracts. He never felt rooted in the city, and when he finally graduated in 1990, he couldn't wait to get on with his life.

== Style of comedy ==
While Killinggänget is mostly known for its use of irony and pop-culture references, Gustafsson usually employs a more traditional and physical style of comedy, such as slapstick and playing characters with highly exaggerated personalities. He is well known for his range of voices and accents, and his tendency to play people who end up hurting themselves. This style is a lot more pronounced when he is working solo or with other people outside Killinggänget.

Some of the roles that Robert has portrayed include:

- Greger Hawkwind is a blatantly homosexual chief fire officer who dresses in a plaid kilt. First seen in NileCity 105,6, he has a one-track mind and makes inappropriate sexual allusions to the point of harassment to most of the men he meets, but his primary target of attention is Percy Nilegård.
- Weiron is portrayed as a working-class man and a native of Gothenburg. He hosts the NileCity 105,6 morning radio show Weiron i Ottan, which starts at 3:30 am. Waking people up by making random phone calls, he freely interprets their occupations and expresses contempt for capitalism and inhabitants of Stockholm. He drives a forklift to work and operates loud and heavy machinery in the studio.
- Fred Asp is an alcoholic who first appeared on the television show I manegen med Glenn Killing. Fred brings his stuffed ferret, Göran, when he is out partying and proceeds to tell stories about his drinking buddy. Fred claims that Göran embarrasses him in public and accuses Göran of having a refined taste. Some of Fred's own drink recipes include Haschi-baschi (Finlandia with Desivon), White Christmas (Explorer with Tipp-Ex) and Rembrandt (eggnog with white spirit).
- Sudden is an assumed mental patient, first seen in NileCity 105,6, who visits the studio from time to time when on leave from the psychiatric hospital. He brings miscellaneous things and assumes the role of sports commentator. This practice has given birth to such obscure sports as botanic Muay Thai, crayfish ski jumping and parallel yoghurt.
- Tobias is a restless and bad-tempered man in his mid-thirties who likes to play with gadgets that he buys online. He has manic episodes when he is completely unmanageable and acts recklessly. Tobias and his single mother, Monica or Morran, live together in poverty on the outskirts of society. They are two dysfunctional individuals who somehow manage to get by as a family.
- Roland Järverup is the frontman and lead vocalist of the dansband Rolandz, who have released five albums and competed in the 2018 Melodifestivalen. Roland first appeared in the film Screwed in Tallinn, in which he travelled to Estonia in search of a woman to share his life with. He has a slightly cleft lip and is both gentle and soft-spoken. He also nurtures an interest in cooking and is usually able to stay positive after a setback.
- Bertil Svensson is an accident-prone gardener who hosts a television show called Lost in My Own Garden. This role was inspired by a 1980s Swedish gardening show where the host accidentally cut his thumb with a knife but kept going as if nothing had happened. (The Julia Child spoof by Dan Aykroyd might have been an inspiration as well.) This role led to some of Gustafsson's more gory comedy.
- Classe Ekman is a Swedish journalist who first appeared in the Norwegian television show Åpen Post. He works as a correspondent for Sveriges Television in Norway. As a result of his minimal understanding of the Norwegian language, he often resorts to fabricating news stories, presenting false facts and making up translations during interviews.

Gustafsson is also known for portraying various old and often rather senile individuals.

Gustafsson is also known as an impressionist. His impersonations include Ingmar Bergman, Sven Wollter, Ernst-Hugo Järegård, Tony Rickardsson, Robert Aschberg and Magnus Härenstam as well as former Prime Ministers Göran Persson and Carl Bildt.

== Fame ==
Gustafsson is one of Sweden's most famous comedians, having appeared in many TV shows and films. He has also appeared on Norwegian television, in the show Åpen Post. Robert Gustafsson has been a cornerstone of Swedish entertainment for many years. He has played in sitcoms such as Rena rama Rolf, and been a regular guest on comedy shows such as Gäster med gester and Parlamentet, a popular panel show similar to BBC's If I Ruled the World.

== Racism controversy ==
In February 2014, the satirical programme SNN News showed a sketch where Gustavsson played a "Representative of the Sámi", an indigenous people of Sweden. The sketch was widely accused of racism against Sámi people, both in Swedish media and abroad in Norway, where most of the Sámi people live. More than fifty individual viewers have filed complaints about the sketch to the Swedish Broadcasting Commission.

== Filmography ==
=== Film ===
Year	Title	Role	Notes	Ref.
1991	Underground Secrets	Young man		
1993	The Ferris Wheel	Karlberg		
1993	Drömkåken	Fredrik		
1993	Sune's Summer	Leffe		
1994	I manegen med Glenn Killing: Del IV Live från Berns	Ove Markström	Also co-writer	
1994	Lust	Uffe		
1995	Alfred	Ragnar Sohlman		
1996	Att stjäla en tjuv	Roger		
1997	Lilla Jönssonligan på styva linan	Kanonkulan		
2001	Monsters, Inc.	Michael "Mike" Wazowski (Swedish dub)		
2002	Ice Age	Sid (Swedish dub)		
2003	Illusive Tracks	The soldier		
2004	Four Shades of Brown	Christer Landin, Johan	Guldbagge Award for Best Actor in a Leading Role, also co-writer	
2005	Robots	Fender (Swedish dub)		
2006	Ice Age: The Meltdown	Sid (Swedish dub)		
2008	Horton Hears a Who!	Horton (Swedish dub)		
2009	Ice Age: Dawn of the Dinosaurs	Sid (Swedish dub)		
2009	Planet 51	Captain Charles T. "Chuck" Baker (Swedish dub)		
2012	Ice Age: Continental Drift	Sid (Swedish dub)		
2013	The Hundred-Year-Old Man Who Climbed Out of the Window and Disappeared	Allan Karlsson		
2015	Holy Mess	Ulf		
2016	Ice Age: Collision Course	Sid (Swedish dub)		
2016	Morran och Tobias – Som en skänk från ovan	Tobias, the priest, wedding guest	Also co-writer	
2016	The 101-Year-Old Man Who Skipped Out on the Bill and Disappeared	Allan Karlsson		
2019	Eld & lågor [En: Swoon]	Gustaf Nilsson		
2019	Toy Story 4	Gaffe (Swedish dub)		
2020	Rymdresan	Albert Mann		
2021	Bröllop, begravning och dop – filmen	Henrik Wahlmark		
2024	Jönssonligan kommer tillbaka	Charles-Ingvar "Sickan" Jönsson		
2025	Regnmannen †	Ingmar	Post-production	
2025	Handbok för superhjältar †	Wolfgang, Steve the Gull (voices)	Performance capture animation. Post-production	
2026	Grannfejden †	Harry Flodman		
2026	Jönssonligan & Wall Enberg †	Charles-Ingvar "Sickan" Jönsson	Pre-production	
TBA	Untitled Ingmar Bergman movie †	Ingmar Bergman		

Key
†	Denotes films that have not yet been released

=== Television ===
==== Acting performances ====
Year	Title	Role	Notes	Ref.
1985	Skrotnisse och hans vänner	Karl "Kalle" Järnberg (voice)	Family, adventure. Puppet production. 10 episodes	
1987–1994	Björnes magasin	Robert	Childen's series. Also co-writer	
1991	Brutal-TV	Bertil Svensson, Grundström, Lemmy, medical doctor, pastor, psychologist, Singoalla	Sketch comedy. 6 episodes	
1991	Felix & Fenix	Felix	Childen's series. 6 episodes. Also creator and writer. Distributed as a film in 1998	
1992	I manegen med Glenn Killing	Fred Asp, Robban, among others	Sketch comedy. 7 episodes. Also co-writer	
1992	Direkt från Berns	Fred Asp, among others	Cabaret. 23 episodes	
1992–1994	Grammisgalan	Ace of Base, Stefan Andersson, Barbagay, Stakka Bo, Robert Broberg, Steffe	Awards ceremony. 3 appearances	
1993	Chefen fru Ingeborg	The bookkeeper	Drama miniseries. 3 episodes	
1993	Nästa man till rakning	Barbershop customer	Comedy drama. S1 E3, 8	
1993	Var och varannans värld	Reine, the Baron, various characters	Children's series. 10 episodes	
1994	Ni bad om det	Lukas Berndtz	Comedy. 60s pastiche. 14 episodes	
1994	Planeten Pi		Childen's series. Puppet production. 10 episodes. First broadcast 3 February 1994	
1994	Rapport till himlen	The guarding police officer	Drama miniseries	
1994–1998	Rena rama Rolf	Nils "Nisse" Gustav Bertil Lind	Sitcom. 31 episodes	
1995	Majken	Tage	Drama miniseries. 3 episodes	
1995	NileCity 105,6	Greger Hawkwind, Weiron, among others	Comedy. 6 episodes. Also co-writer	
1995	Cancergalan	Carl Bildt (skit: "Guben i Låddan"), surgeon (skit: "Kirurgerna")	Fundraising gala	
1995–2013	Allsång på Skansen	Fred Asp, Ingmar Bergman, Berit, Sten Broman, Greger Hawkwind, the Janitor, Joel, Roland Järverup, the Pensioner, Adrian Petrén, Tony Rickardsson	Live music, entertainment. Appeared on several season finales	
1996	Arne Anka - An Evening at Zekes	Arne Anka	Comedy play	
1996	Kungen 50 år: Födelsedagsgala	Municipal commissioner	Concert	
1996	Percy tårar	Kapten Klänning, Allan i Dalen	Comedy. 6 episodes. Also co-writer	
1997	Tartuffe - hycklaren	Tartuffe	Comedy drama film	
1999	Gunnar Rehlin – en liten film om att göra någon illa	Himself	Drama. Fyra små filmer – part 1. Also co-writer	
1999	Ben & Gunnar – en liten film om manlig vänskap	Ben	Drama. Fyra små filmer – part 2. Also co-writer	
1999	På sista versen – en liten film om döden	Dr Hanke, Aj aj-man, TV executive	Farce. Fyra små filmer – part 3. Also co-writer	
1999	Screwed in Tallinn	Roland Järverup, Micke "Jan Banan", Lasse Kongo	Comedy drama. Fyra små filmer – part 4. Also co-writer. Golden Gate Award for best television comedy	
2000	Grogg	Tant Lingon, Bertil Svensson, among others	Sketch comedy. 10 episodes. Also co-producer	
2000	Glenn Killing på Grand	Lars Brundin, Lasse Kongo, Tant Råbiff, Tupolevs	Cabaret. Also co-writer	
2001–2002	Pangbulle	Axel Båth, among others	Sketch comedy. 3 episodes	
2002	Robert Wells live at Royal Albert Hall	Greger Hawkwind, Johan Lindström	Concert	
2002	Åpen Post	Stefan Danielsson, Classe Ekman, Zack Falén	Sketch comedy. Season 4. 10 episodes	
2002	Spermaharen	Lars Brundin	Comedy. A collection of four short films	
2003–2009	Swedish Sports Awards	Per Gessle, Totte Löwenhielm, Epo Ollonen, Tony Rickardsson, event planner, extreme sport athlete	Awards ceremony. 2003, 2004, 2006, 2009	
2005	Landins	Christer Landin	Drama. Story from Four Shades of Brown; reedited with additional footage. Also co-writer	
2005	Pappas lilla tjockis	Johan	Drama. Story from Four Shades of Brown; reedited with additional footage. Also co-writer	
2005	Tältprojektet 2004	Carl-Einar Häckner, Magnus Härenstam, Roland Järverup, Mattias, Weiron	Revue	
2005	Hotelliggaren	Georg Dahlberg	Stage farce. Swedish version of Two into One	
2005	En decemberdröm	Chefen, Zigge	Christmas calendar. 8 episodes	
2005–2007	TV2-nøttene	Bertil Svensson	Quiz show, parody. 35 episodes	
2006	Jul i Tøyengata	Radko Lucic, bicycle messenger	Christmas calendar. A parody of Jul i Skomakergata	
2007	Hjälp!	Papa Papadopolous	Sitcom. 10 episodes	
2008	Lånta fjädrar	Hilding Hörnberg	Stage farce. Rework of Der Keusche Lebemann	
2009	Rolandz: The Movie	Roland Järverup	Also writer and director	
2010	Rolandz: Danzar igen	Roland Järverup	Also writer and director	
2011	Rolandz: Fadersjakten	Roland Järverup	Also co-writer and co-director	
2011	Sara & Selma	Håkan	Sitcom. 8 episodes	
2011–2012	Gustafsson 3 tr	Fredrik Gustafsson, Gottfrid Gustafsson, Nils Emanuel Herman	Comedy. 2 seasons. 20 episodes	
2013	Svensk humor	Tobias	Sketch comedy. 10 episodes	
2013	Partaj	Fred Asp, Sudden	Sketch comedy	
2013–2014	SNN News	Carl Bildt, Lars-Åke Fahlén, Tony Irving, Vladimir Putin, Claes Stakke, Yohio	News parody. 6 episodes	
2014	Morran och Tobias	Tobias	Comedy. Also co-creator and co-writer. 16 episodes	
2014	Moraeus med mera	Roland Järverup (as Rolandz), Tony Rickardsson	Live music, entertainment	
2018	Melodifestivalen	Roland Järverup (as Rolandz)	Music competition. Heat 4 and the final	
2018	Lotta på Liseberg	Roland Järverup (as Rolandz), Weiron	Live music, entertainment	
2018–2021	The Truth Will Out	Peter Wendel	Mystery, thriller. 13 episodes	
2019	Rolandz på Rondo	Roland Järverup, Greger Hawkwind, Tony Rickardsson, Weiron	Cabaret	
2019–2020	Bröllop, begravning och dop	Henrik Wahlmark	Drama. 2 episodes	
2019–2020	Ture Sventon och Bermudatriangelns hemlighet	Ture Sventon	Family, adventure. 6 episodes	
2020	Robert Gustafsson håller låda	Various characters	Comedy lecture	
2021	The Unlikely Murderer	Stig Engström	Crime, drama. 5 episodes	
2022	Toppen	Kaminsky	Political satire. 6 episodes	
2023	Ture Sventon och jakten på Ungdomens källa	Ture Sventon	Family, adventure. 10 episodes	
2023	Ture Sventon och den magiska lampan	Ture Sventon	Family, adventure. 6 episodes	
2024	Morran och Tobias – Pengarna eller livet	Tobias	Comedy. 8 episodes. Also co-creator and co-writer	
2024	Felix och Fenix godnattsaga	Felix	Childen's series. 6 episodes. Also creator and writer	

==== Non-acting appearances ====
(Non-scripted acting on game shows, reality shows, talk shows etc. also falls under this category.)

Year	Title	Notes	Ref.
1993	Gallimatias	Improvisational comedy. Presented by Adde Malmberg and broadcast on SVT1	
1993	Kryzz	Game show. Presented by Arne Hegerfors and broadcast on SVT1	
1993–2012	Gäster med gester	Charades game show. Based on Give Us a Clue. 7 episodes	
1994	Guldbagge Awards	Awards ceremony. Presented by Lennart Swahn and broadcast 31 January on TV4	
1996	Söndagsöppet	Talk show	
1996	Sitt vackert	Talk show. Presented by Sven Melander and broadcast 21 September on SVT1	
1996	Nike	Culture magazine	
1996–2001	Sen kväll med Luuk	Talk show. 4 episodes	
1997	Ekdal	Interview. Broadcast 24 September on TV4	
1998	Annika Jankell möter...	Interview	
1999	Anna på nya äventyr	Personal interview	
1999	Har du hört den förut?	Comedy. 3 episodes	
1999	Tusenårsfesten på Stockholms Slott	Concert with narrator	
2002–2022	Parlamentet	Panel show. Seasons 7–35. 60 episodes	
2003	Snacka om nyheter	Panel show. Swedish version of Have I Got News for You	
2003–2017	Så ska det låta	Musical game show. Seasons 8–22. 8 episodes	
2003–2017	Time out	Game show. Seasons 1–14. 85 episodes	
2008–2012	Robins	Talk show. 3 episodes	
2009	Roast på Berns	Roast	
2010	Skavlan	Talk show. 3 episodes	
2010	Berg flyttar in	Reality show	
2010–2019	Malou efter tio	Talk show. 8 episodes	
2012–2013	Stjärnorna på slottet	Reality show. 5 episodes	
2013	Helt sjukt	Health magazine	
2013	Hellenius hörna	Talk show, 9 episodes	
2014	En clown till kaffet	Reality show. 7 episodes	
2015	Stjärnor hos Babben	Talk show	
2016	Brynolf & Ljung - street magic	Street magic	
2016	Breaking News med Filip och Fredrik	Talk show	
2016	Bytt är bytt	Game show	
2017	Renées brygga	Interview	
2017	K special	Arts and culture documentary	
2018	Tomas von Brömssen: En svensk i Norge	Arts and culture documentary	
2019	Klassfesten	Game show	
2022	Vilket liv!	Talk show. Career achievement recognition	
2022–2025	LOL: Skrattar bäst som skrattar sist	Reality show. 2 seasons. 12 episodes	
2024	Berättelsen om Killinggänget	Arts and culture documentary. 3 episodes	
2025	Tvångstango	Documentary	
2025	Komikerjäveln	Documentary. 3 episodes	

=== Theatre ===
Year	Title	Role	Director	Venue	Notes	Ref.
1985	Kungen är naken (The Emperor's New Clothes, by Evgeny Schwartz)	The King		Kafé Kristina, Gamla Stan, Stockholm	A Teaterverkstan production. Opened in autumn 1985	
1989	Besökare (Besucher)	Bartender and others *student	Jan Maagaard	Stockholm City Theatre	Opening date: 15 September	
1989	Viktor och Misse med de blå...	Viktor	Inger Jalmert-Moritz	Stockholm City Theatre	Opening date: 3 December	
1991–1992	Bollarna i luften	Participant	Marianne Tedenstad	Tibble Theatre, Täby	Also co-writer, Revue	
1993–1994	Parneviks Cirkusparty	Participant	Anders Albien	Cirkus, Stockholm	Revue. Opening date: 9 September	
1995	Arne Anka	Arne Anka	Anders Öhrn	Stockholm City Theatre	25 August – 22 December. 84 performances	
1996	Lektionen (The Lesson)	The Professor	Hans Klinga	Royal Dramatic Theatre, Stockholm	Opening date: 12 July. 56 performances	
1997–1999	Hotelliggaren (Two into One)	Georg Dahlberg	Bo Hermansson	Chinateatern, Stockholm	Opening date: 19 September. 286 performances. Ticket sales: 348,000	
2000–2001	Maken till fruar (Run for Your Wife)	Per-Arne Nilsson (the taxi driver)	Bo Hermansson	Oscarsteatern, Stockholm	Opening date: 21 September	
2002	Revisorn (The Government Inspector)	Chlestakov (the Inspector)	Wilhelm Carlsson	Chinateatern, Stockholm	Opening date: 19 September	
2003	Nysningen (The Good Doctor)	Ivan Iljitj Tjerdjakov, Kurjatin, the husband, the sailor, Kistunov, the son	Johan Wahlström	Stockholm City Theatre	Opening date: 12 December	
2004	Fångad på nätet (Caught in the net)	Per-Arne Nilsson (the taxi driver)	Bo Hermansson	Oscarsteatern, Stockholm	A sequel to Run For Your Wife. Opening date: 23 September	
2006	Lögn i helvete (The Lying Kind)	Konstapel Johnson	Lars Amble	Vasateatern, Stockholm later relocated to Chinateatern	Opening date: 19 January	
2006	Oscars 100-årsjubileum	Participant	Hans Marklund	Oscarsteatern, Stockholm	6 December. Hosted by Lill Lindfors	
2007	Rivierans guldgossar (Dirty Rotten Scoundrels)	Freddy Benson	Bo Hermansson	Cirkus, Stockholm	Musical. Opening date: 20 September	
2008	Lånta Fjädrar (Der Keusche Lebemann)	Hilding Hörnberg	Stefan Ekman	Krusenstiernska gården, Kalmar	Opening date: 3 July	
2009–2010	Drömmen om Herrön	Robert	Tomas Alfredson	Royal Dramatic Theatre, Stockholm	Also co-writer. 9 September 2009 – 24 February 2010. 63 performances. Ticket sales: 47,052	
2010	Zpanska flugan (The Spanish Fly)	Molgan Ribba	Leif Lindblom	Krusenstiernska gården, Kalmar	1 July – 1 August	
2010–2011	Robert Gustafssons 25-års Jubileumsrevy	Several characters	Leif Lindblom	Rondo, Gothenburg; Amiralen, Malmö; Cirkus, Stockholm	Opening date: 23 september	
2012	Hjälten från Kalmarsund (The Daring Swimmer)	The Bookseller	Bo Hermansson	Krusenstiernska gården, Kalmar	Opening date: 28 June	
2013	Rain Man	Raymond Babbitt	Emma Bucht	Rival, Stockholm	Opening date: 25 January	
2014	Charmörer på vift (The True Jacob)	Birger Molander	Bo Hermansson	Krusenstiernska gården, Kalmar	26 June – 3 August	
2014–2015	Kom igen, Charlie! (The Foreigner)	Charlie Baker	Peter Dalle	Oscarsteatern, Stockholm	18 September 2014 – 28 March 2015	
2015	Tresteg i snedsteg (Anyone for Breakfast?)	Knut	Anders 'Adde' Malmberg	Krusenstiernska gården, Kalmar	Opening date: 25 June. 30 performances	
2016	Oscarsrevyn	Participant	Edward af Sillén	Oscarsteatern, Stockholm	Opening date: 22 September	
2017	Flaggan i topp (Hooray, It's a Boy!)	Sigge Sackarin	Anders 'Adde' Malmberg	Krusenstiernska gården, Kalmar	29 June – 30 July. 32 performances	
2018	Trassel (Out of Order)	Göran Dahlberg	Edward af Sillén	Krusenstiernska gården, Kalmar	28 June – 28 July	
2020–2022	Rain Man	Raymond Babbitt	Emma Bucht	Oscarsteatern, Stockholm	8 October 2020 – 30 April 2022	
2022–2023	Tootsie	Michael Dorsey	Edward af Sillén	Oscarsteatern, Stockholm	Musical. Opening date: 29 September 2022	
2024	Oj då! … en till?! (One for the Pot)	Kalle, Sven and Sverre (the Stolpe brothers)	Edward af Sillén	Krusenstiernska gården, Kalmar	27 June – 28 July	
2025	Trassel (Out of Order)	Göran Dahlberg	Edward af Sillén	Oscarsteatern, Stockholm	13 September 2025 – 3 May 2026	
2026	Fångad på nätet (Caught in the net)	Herman (Göran's father)	Edward af Sillén	Krusenstiernska gården, Kalmar	Opening date: 25 June	
