= Henrik Schyffert =

Swedish comedian

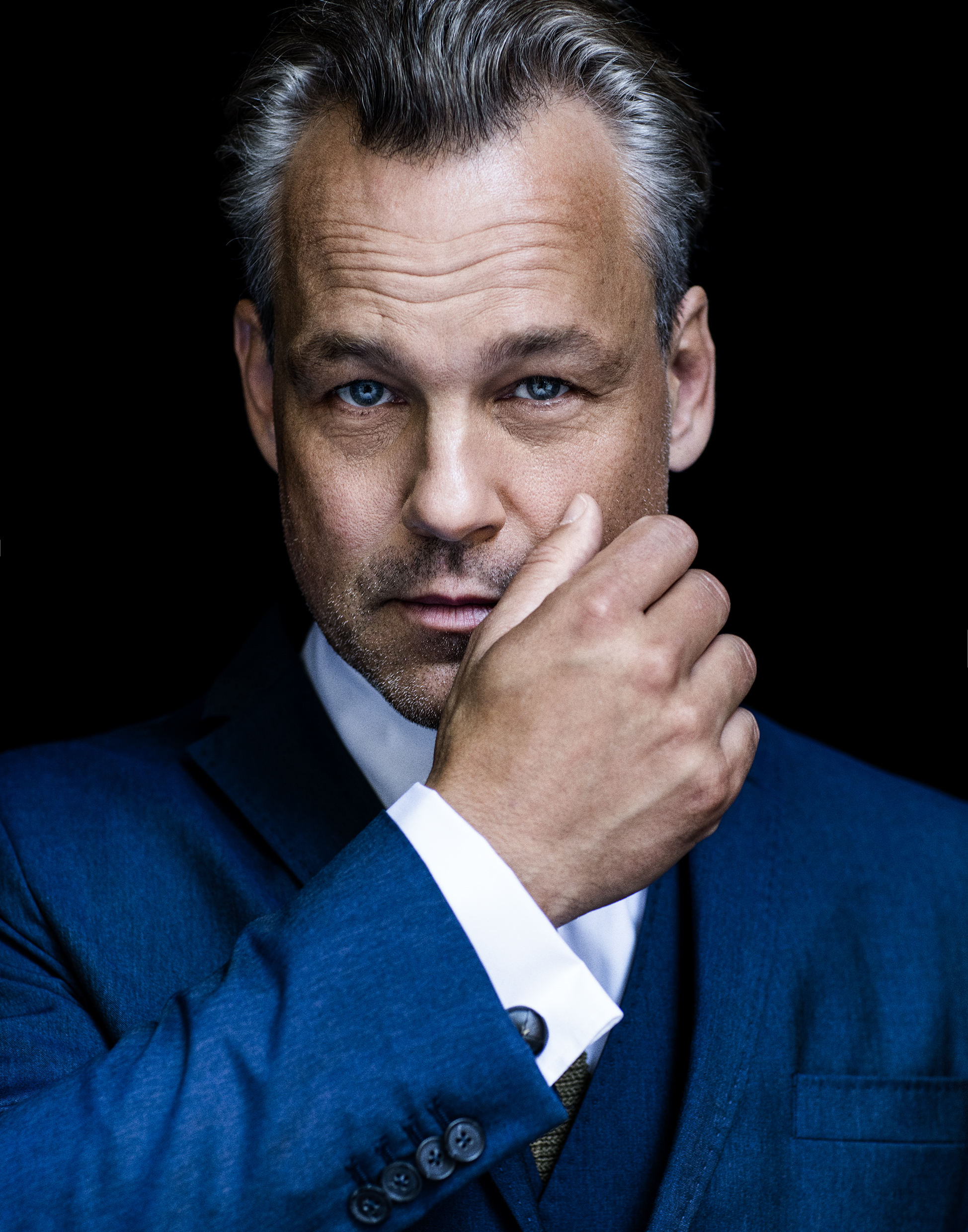
- Schyffert in 2015
- Born: Per Henrik Nilsson; 23 February 1968 (age 58); Ronneby, Blekinge, Sweden
- Notable work: Whale
- Spouse(s): Bea Uusma Schyffert (1996-2012); Nour El-Refai (2013-2025)

Comedy career
- Years active: 1985–present
- Medium: Television

Per Henrik Schyffert (born 23 February 1968) is a Swedish comedian, actor, musician and radio and television personality.

== Career ==
Schyffert was a VJ for MTV Europe in the late 1980s. In 1992 he hosted the comedy TV show I Manegen Med Glenn Killing, also starring Robert Gustafsson and Johan Rheborg. The program was later turned into a successful stage show.

In 1993 he created the radio show Hassan with Kristian Luuk in Stockholm. The show centered on prank phone calls and off-the-wall comedy sketches. He left Hassan as his career with the "Killing" gang took off, and he and Luuk were replaced by Fredrik Lindström. After the show's cancellation in December 1994, Hassan became a cult phenomenon, and as of October 2008 seven CDs have been released with material from the show.

Also in 1993 he released the single "Hobo Humpin' Slobo Babe" with Gordon Cyrus and ex-girlfriend Cia Berg, under the name Whale. Whale's first album, We Care, was released two years later, and the next album, All Disco Dance Must End In Broken Bones followed in 1998. The band toured extensively, and supported Blur on their U.S. tour in 1995. Whale disbanded in the late 1990s.

He and the rest of the "Killing" gang made three more hugely successful TV series — NileCity 105.6, Percy Tårar and Fyra Små Filmer — before hitting the big screen with Fyra Nyanser Av Brunt, which won four Guldbagge Awards in 2005, including Best Film and Best Leading Actor. Schyffert co-wrote the film and played the role of Richard.

He started doing stand-up comedy in 2003, and became the third host of the political satire show Parlamentet, a Swedish adaptation of If I Ruled the World.

In 2005, he made a documentary for Swedish national TV, about humor around the world called Dokument:Humor, in which he interviewed John Cleese, Eddie Izzard, Conan O'Brien, Dylan Moran and others. He also went to Japan to perform stand-up comedy in Japanese. This eventually led to him creating Stor i Japan (English: Big In Japan), an experiment in the form of a reality show in which two of Schyffert's friends, Jens Sjögren and Sebastian Hedin, travel to Tokyo and attempt to achieve fame within 30 days. Stor i Japan aired in eight one-hour episodes on TV6 Sweden in the fall of 2008.

In 2006, he hosted Veckans nyheter on Kanal 5.

In 2008, he invited many of his comedian friends to subject him to a roast in front of a live audience to celebrate his 40th birthday.

In 2008 and 2009, he had a very successful run with touring one-man show The 90s - Ett Försvarstal. The very last performance was broadcast live on Swedish television on 23 May 2009.

In 2020, he directed his first feature film, Run Uje Run, which won the Guldbagge Award for Best Film, while Schyffert received a nomination for Best Director.

== Filmography ==
- 1986 – Eldorado (radio programme)
- 1992 – PopiTopp (TV series)
- 1994 – I manegen med Glenn Killing - Live från Berns (televised stage show with Killinggänget)
- 1994 – Hassan (radio programme)
- 1995 – Bert: The Last Virgin (film)
- 1995 – NileCity 105,6 (TV series with Killinggänget)
- 1996 – Percy Tårar (TV series with Killinggänget)
- 1996 – Knesset (TV programme)
- 1999 – Fyra små filmer (four TV films with Killinggänget)
  - Gunnar Rehlin - En liten film om att göra någon illa
  - Ben & Gunnar - En liten film om manlig vänskap
  - På sista versen - En liten film om döden
  - Torsk på Tallinn - En liten film om ensamhet
- 2000 – Glenn Killing på Grand (TV series with Killinggänget)
- 2001 – Kritikerna (TV series)
- 2001 – Heja Björn (TV series)
- 2002 – Spermaharen (only released on DVD and the project website, with Killinggänget)
- 2002 – Grammisgalan (TV gala)
- 2003 – Parlamentet (TV series)
- 2004 – Fyra nyanser av brunt (four TV films with Killinggänget)
- 2005 – Parlamentet (TV series, comeback)
- 2005 – Melodifestivalen 2005 (music contest)
- 2005 – Dokument:Humor (TV series)
- 2006 – Veckans nyheter (TV series)
- 2007 – Sverige dansar och ler (TV series)
- 2007 – Svenskar är också människor (TV series)
- 2008 – Sverige pussas och kramas (TV series)
- 2009 – Maskeraden
- 2008 – Stor i Japan - ett experiment av Henrik Schyffert (TV series)
- 2009 – Hjälp! (TV series, guest)
- 2009 – Roast på Berns
- 2010 – Dom kallar oss roliga
- 2010 – Landet brunsås
- 2012 – Historieätarna
- 2013 - Allt faller
- 2020 – Run Uje Run (director)
- 2021 – A Class Apart – Zebrarummet (TV series)
