= Johan Rheborg =

Swedish actor, comedian and writer

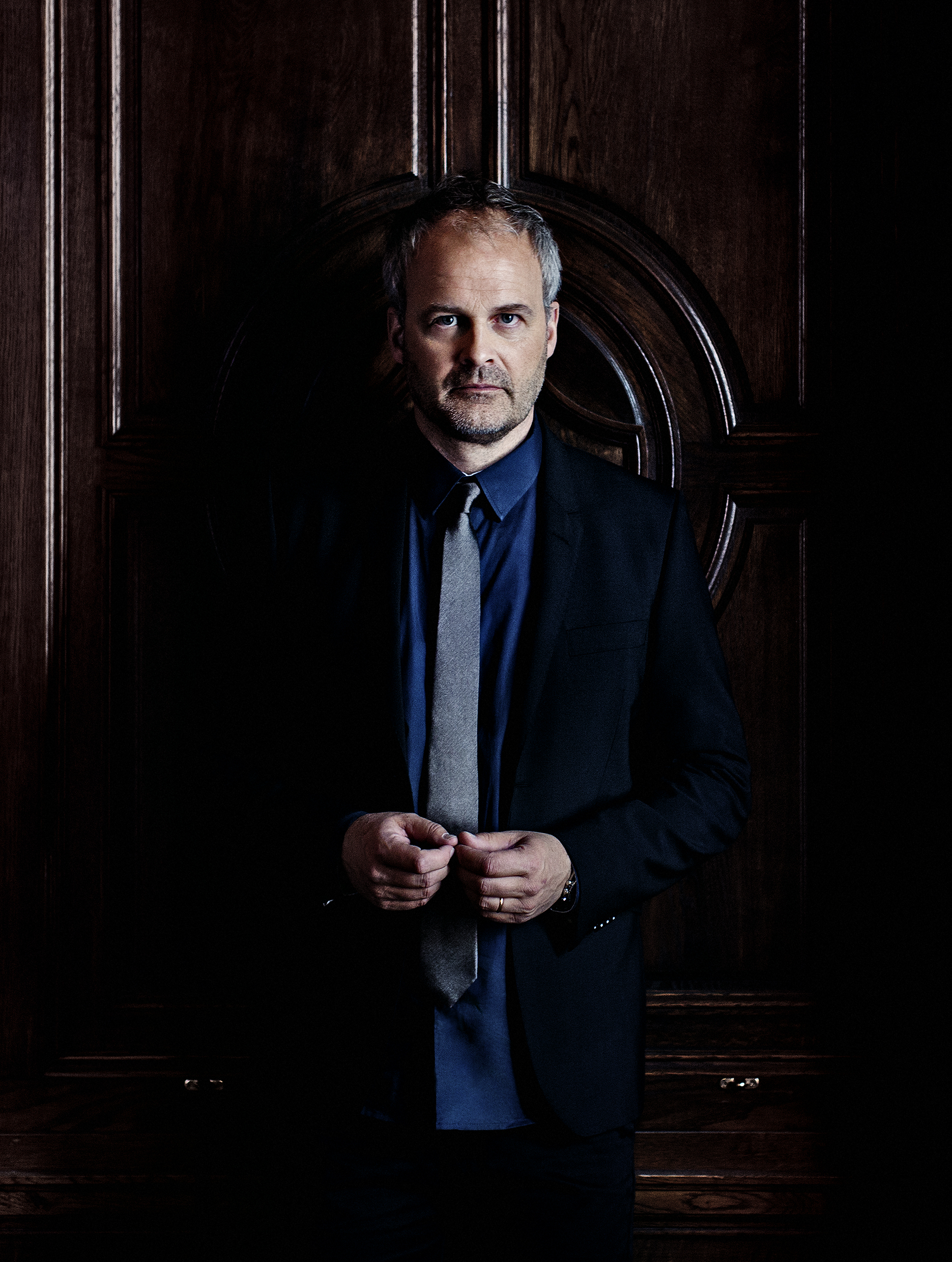
- Rheborg in 2014
- Born: Carl Johan Rheborg; 5 June 1963 (age 63); Täby, Sweden
- Occupations: Actor, comic, screenwriter, director
- Years active: 1986–present

Carl Johan Rheborg (born 5 June 1963) is a Swedish comedian, actor, director, and screenwriter. He played one of the main characters, Percy Nilegård, as a member of the Swedish comedy group Killinggänget, who appeared on Swedish TV in the 1990s and 2000s, and as the space hero Kenny Starfighter in the TV series of the same name in 1997. He also became known playing the "talking stain" in Tide's TV commercial for the 2008 Super Bowl. In 2025 he played police officer Tomas Ness in the Netflix crime drama series The Glass Dome. He has also performed on stage, and has written scripts for several films and TV series.

== Early life and education ==
Carl Johan Rheborg was born on 5 June 1963 in Täby, Sweden, to a middle-class family.

He became interested in film as a child and made his own short films, and as a teenager worked in a photography shop and for a video company. He tried twice to get into drama school but was unsuccessful. In 1990 he studied for a law degree, but found that it did not suit him, so entered the advertising industry via training at RMI Bergh's advertising school.

== Career ==
After Rheborg met Henrik Schyffert through Rally TV, and then Jonas Inde on a writing course, the three of them, along with Schyffert's friend Andres Lokko, formed the comedy group Killinggänget ("The Killing Gang". In 1999 Killinggänget made a TV film anthology under the common title Fyra små filmer (Four Small Films), which included Gunnar Rehlin - en liten film om att göra någon illa (Gunnar Rehlin - a small film about hurting someone), Ben & Gunnar - en liten film om manlig vänskap (Ben & Gunnar - a small film about male friendship), På sista versen - en liten film om döden (On the Last Verse - a small film about death), and Torsk på Tallinn - en liten film om ensamhet (Screwed in Tallinn - a small film about loneliness). Screwed in Tallinn was a parody of Kåge Jonsson's TV documentaries. Rheborg played one of the group's regular characters, Percy Nilegård, in a satire of contemporary management philosophy.

In 1997 he played space hero Kenny Starfighter in the cult TV series of the same name. In 1999 he starred in Hotelliggaren, a film version of the 1984 British stage farce Two Into One by English playwright Ray Cooney.

He became known in the United States when he played the talking stain in Tide's TV commercial for the 2008 Super Bowl.

In 2025 he had a lead role as police officer Tomas Ness in the Netflix crime drama series The Glass Dome.

=== Stage ===
In 1995–1996 Rheborg performed on stage in China in The Little Shop of Horrors. In 2003 he appeared in Gifta vänner at Stockholm City Theatre's Backstage.

In January 2015, Rheborg played the leading role as Ove in a stage adaptation of Swedish writer Fredrik Backman's 2012 novel En man som heter Ove (A Man Called Ove) , which premiered in Stockholm. In June 2016 he was one of three people responsible for another dramatisation of the novel for Oslo Nye Teater (Oslo New Theatre), in a stage production performed in collaboration with the Norwegian Touring Theatre and Thorsson Productions and directed by Bjarni Haukur Thorsson. Sven Nordin played Ove.

== Awards and nominations ==
Rheborg has been nominated for the Guldbagge Award at least three times: twice for Best Actor in a Leading Role (2005, for Four Shades of Brown and 2020, for his role as Claes in Orca), and once for Best Screenplay (2005, for Four Shades of Brown).

== Selected filmography ==
=== As actor ===
- 1992: I manegen med Glenn Killing (In the Ring with Glenn Killing)
- 1995: NileCity 105,6
- 1995: Bert – Den siste oskulden (Bert – The Last Virgin)
- 1996: Percy tårar (Percy's Tears)
- 1997: Kenny Starfighter
- 1998: Rederiet (High Seas)
- 1999: Hotelliggaren (released on DVD 2005)
- 1999: Fyra små filmer (Four Small Films):
  - Gunnar Rehlin - en liten film om att göra någon illa (Gunnar Rehlin - a small film about hurting someone)
  - Ben & Gunnar - en liten film om manlig vänskap (Ben & Gunnar - a small film about male friendship)
  - På sista versen - en liten film om döden (On the Last Verse - a small film about death)
  - Screwed in Tallinn - a small film about loneliness (Torsk på Tallinn - en liten film om ensamhet)
- 2000: En häxa i familjen (A Witch In The Family)
- 2001: Känd från TV (Known From TV)
- 2002: Cleo
- 2004: Four Shades of Brown (Swedish title: Fyra nyanser av brunt)
- 2007: Hjälp!
- 2009: Kenny Begins
- 2010–2023: Solsidan
- 2020: Nelly Rapp – Monster Agent
- 2021–22: Agatha Christie's Hjerson
- 2023: Nelly Rapp - The Secret of the Black Forest
- 2024: Nova & Alice
- 2025: The Glass Dome (Netflix miniseries)

=== As screenwriter ===
Rheborg wrote the scripts for the following films:

- 1999: På sista versen : en liten film om döden
- 1999: Ben & Gunnar : en liten film om manlig vänskap
- 1999: Gunnar Rehlin - en liten film om att göra någon illa
- 1999: Screwed in Tallinn
- 2004: Four Shades of Brown (Fyra nyanser av brunt)
- 2016: Morran och Tobias - Som en skänk från ovan

=== Creator ===
- 2014: Morran och Tobias (TV series)
