= Parlamentet =

Swedish television series

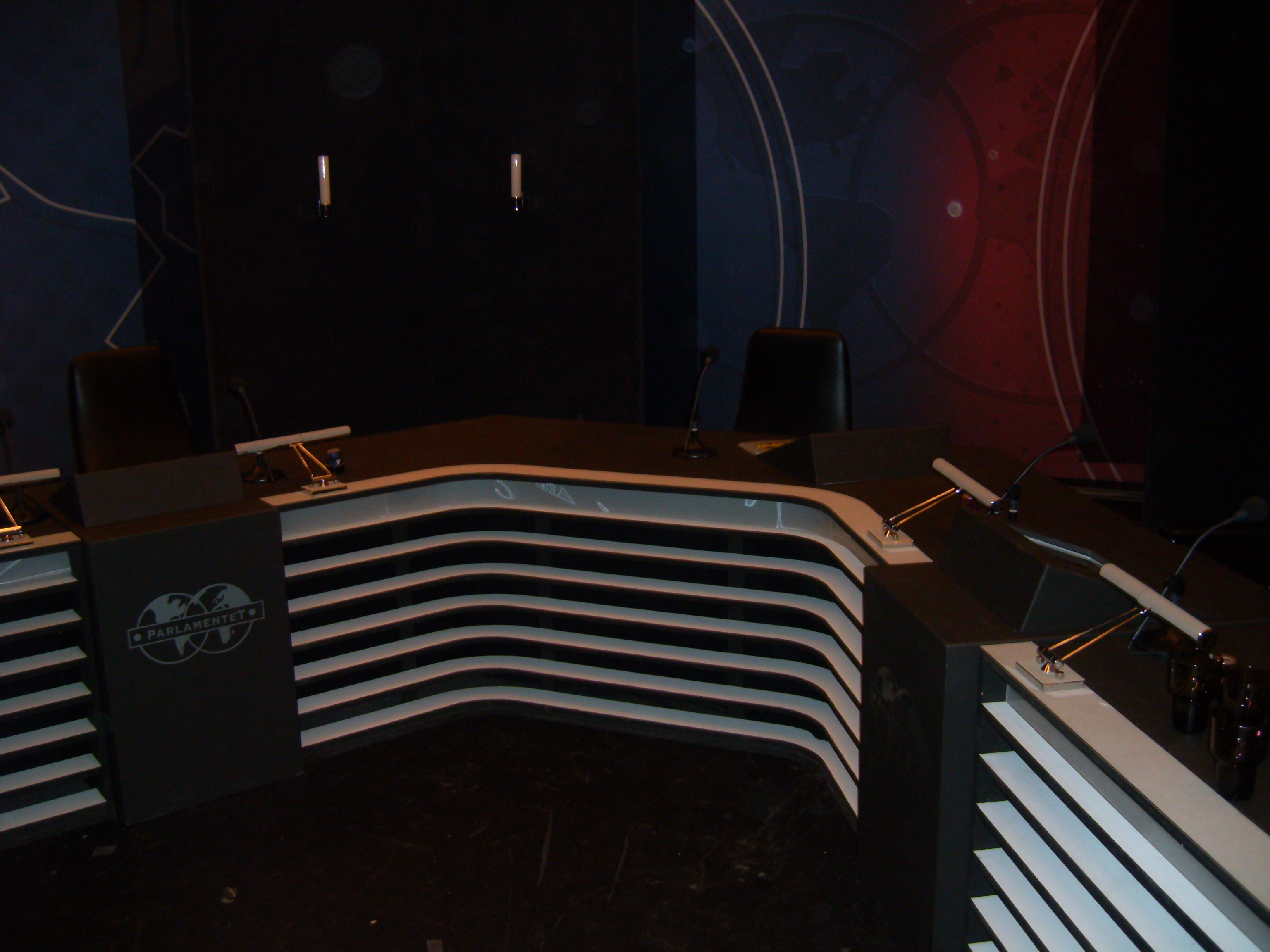
- The show's studio
- Created by: Richard Osman
- Presented by: Staffan Ling (1999); Hans Rosenfeldt (2000–2003, one episode 2009); Henrik Schyffert (2003–2004); Pär Lernström (2011); Anders S Nilsson (2004–2010, 2014–present)
- Starring: Henrik Dorsin, Anders Jansson, Henrik Schyffert, Magnus Betner, Mikael Tornving, Henrik Hjelt, André Wickström, Johan Glans, Johan Rheborg
- Country of origin: Sweden
- Original language: Swedish
- No. of series: 23

Production
- Executive producer: Niklas Vestberg
- Producer: Benjamin Thuresson
- Production locations: TV4-huset Studio 1 (1999–2006), SVT Studios 2 and 4 (present)
- Running time: 22 minutes
- Production company: Jarowskij

Original release
- Network: TV4

Related
- If I Ruled the World

Parlamentet (lit. 'the parliament') is a satirical panel gameshow on TV4, which parodies Swedish political debate. It was first broadcast in 1999 and is currently in its 23rd series. The current presenter is Anders S. Nilsson, who has hosted the show since 2004. Current team members include Babben Larsson, Robin Paulsson, Johan Rheborg and Johan Glans. Kodjo Akolor has also been featured. The program is a Swedish version of the short-run British show If I Ruled the World. The comedians are divided into two teams (parties), red and blue, representing traditional political colours.

== History ==
The show has had many producers over the years including Anders S. Nilsson, Gustaf Skördeman, Stefan Wiik and currently Benjamin Thuresson. The original 1999 panel consisted of Helge Skoog and Johan Wahlström in the blue party with Lasse Eriksson and Annika Lantz in the red party.

Parlamentet was awarded the Kristallen award for best comedy in 2005 and Swedish tabloid newspaper Aftonbladet's TV prize for "Swedish program of the year" (2001–2004), "Entertainment program of the year" (2002–2004) and "Best comedy" (2005, 2007)

== Rounds ==
Round	Year introduced	Participants	Description
Affischnamnet (The Spokesperson)	2009	The whole panel	The panel roasts a guest, who then decides which team they thought were the funniest.
Aktuell rapport (Topical report)	1999	The whole panel	The comedians discuss current events that they have been made aware of in advance and have prepared jokes for.
A till Ö (A to Ö)	2010	One team per show	One team holds a discussion with the host, in which they must start each sentence with a subsequent letter of the alphabet until they reach the final letter, Ö, to win the round or hesitate, thus losing the round.
Duellen (The duel)	1999	One from each team	One person from each team argues their case against each other. The host predetermines who is for and against the issue.
Ja och nej (Yes and no)	2000	The whole panel	The presenter asks quick-fire questions, which the comedians can not answer with yes, no or hesitate – otherwise they lose the round.
Klart man hänger med (Up to date)	1999	Both teams	The presenter asks each team questions, and they usually give a comically wrong answers.
Känsloduellen (The Duel of Emotions)	2007	The whole panel/ One from each team	Comedians to discuss among themselves about a topic that the presenter gives them, sometimes one on one and sometimes with all four comedians involved. At the same time, they follow the prompts i.e. the "emotions" that pop up on the team screen.
Riksdagspartiernas politik (Parliamentary party politics)	2010	Cecilia Forss	Comedian Cecilia Forss goes around Stockholm City and makes fun of the parliamentary party politics, as well as interviewing a number of people.
Standardfrasen (The standard phrase)	2006	The whole panel	The comedians are given a phrase that they must begin all of their sentences with.
Tips från coachen (Tips from the coach)	1999	One from each team	The comedians improvise a discussion with the presenter whilst simultaneously following prompts on the screen on how to behave.
Utan att tveka (Without hesitating)	2005	The whole panel	The comedians follow prompts on their screen and are penalised for hesitation. This round is almost exactly the same as Känsloduellen.

== Teams ==
Blue Party	Red Party
Current members: Karin Adelsköld (2010–present); Claes Malmberg (2000) (2008, 2010–present); David Batra (2009–present); Hasse Brontén (2008–present); Henrik Dorsin (2005–present); Johan Rheborg (2001–present); Johan Wahlström (1999–present); Jonas Gardell(2010–present); Josephine Bornebusch (2009–present); Kristoffer Appelquist (2008–present); Mikael Tornving (1999–present); Per Andersson (2008–present); Petra Mede (2007–present); Robert Gustafsson (2001–present): Robin Paulsson (2010–present); Former members: Annika Andersson (2008); Björn Gustafsson (2007–2008); Carina Berg (2004); Felix Herngren (2004–2005); Helge Skoog (1999–2008); Henrik Hjelt (1999); Henrik Schyffert (2004–2009); Johan Glans (2004); Kajsa Ingemarsson (2000–2001); Kodjo Akolor (2009); Magnus Betnér (2004); Maria Lundqvist (2003); Martin Soneby (2009); Per Morberg (2006); Peter Apelgren (1999); Peter Magnusson (2005–2007); Peter Settman (1999); Pia Johansson (1999–2008); Pontus Enhörning (2004); Robert Gustafsson (2000–2001); Sissela Kyle (1999–2003) (2004–2008); Sofia Bach (2005–2007)	Current members: Anders Jansson (2008–present); Anders Johansson (2010–present); André Wickström (2007–present); Annika Andersson (2007–present); Annika Lantz (1999–2008) (2010–present); Babben Larsson (1999–present); Cecilia Forss (2010–present); Cilla Domstad (2009–present); Henrik Hjelt (1999–present); Johan Glans (2004–present); Magnus Betnér (2004–2008) (2010–present); Marika Carlsson (2010–present); Soran Ismail (2008–present); Former members: Anna Charlotta Gunnarson (2000–2002); Claes Malmberg (2001–2003); Claes Månsson (2004); Claudia Galli (2009); Dan Ekborg (2005–2006); Elisabet Carlsson (2004); Erik Blix (2000); Gustaf Hammarsten (2007); Johan Ulveson (2000–2008); Kajsa Ingemarsson (2000); Kjell Bergqvist (2003); Lars Amble (2004); Lasse Eriksson (1999); Magdalena In de Betou (2006–2007); Maria Lundqvist (2002); Maria Möller (2002); Michael Segerström (1999); Per Andersson (2008); Stefan Grudin (1999–2000)

== See also ==
- If I Ruled the World
