= Magnus Betnér =

Swedish stand-up comedian, social critic and television host

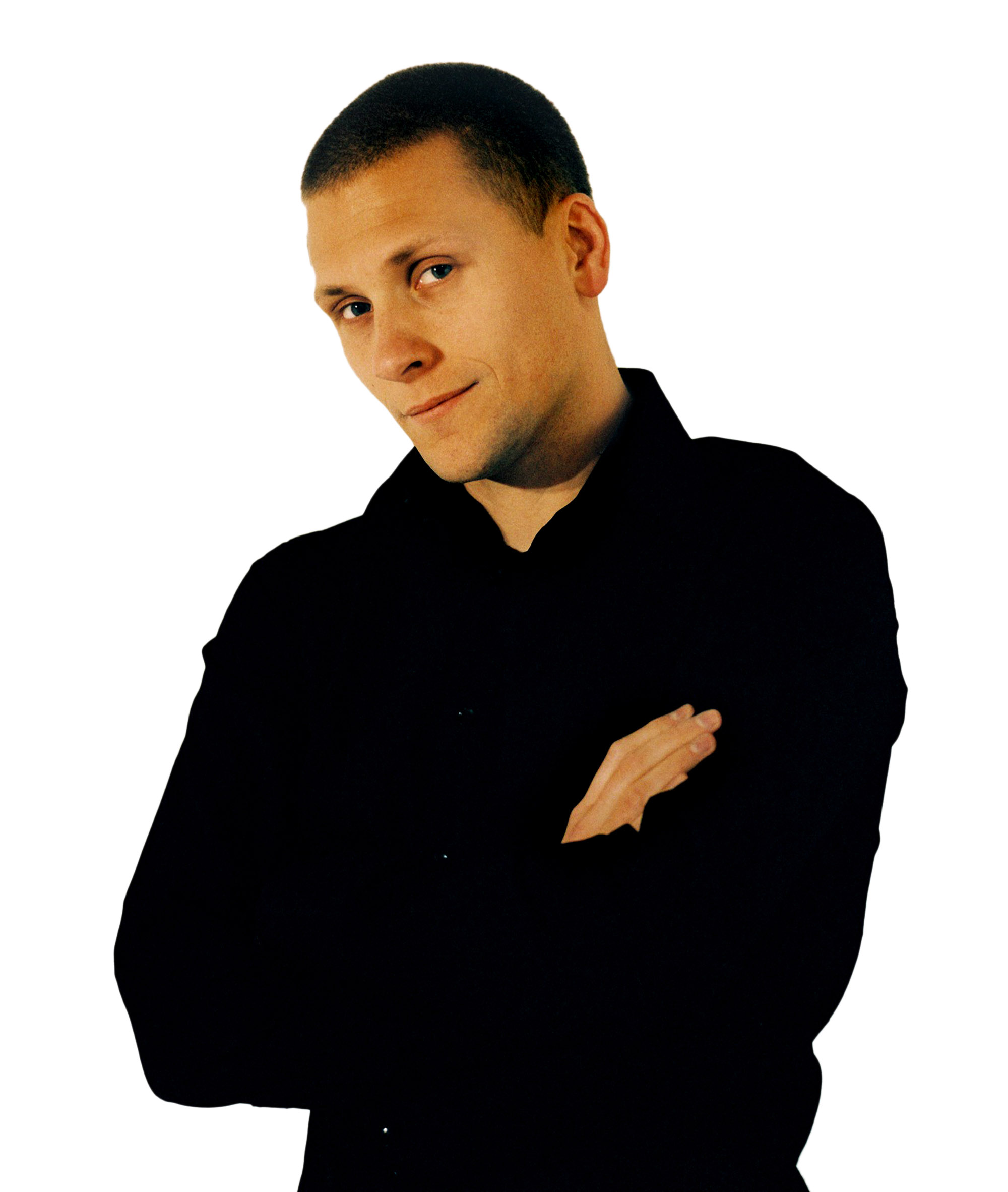
- Born: Magnus Lennarth Betnér; 16 August 1974 (age 52); Stockholm, Sweden

Comedy career
- Years active: 1998–present
- Medium: Stand-up
- Genres: Political satire, blue comedy, observational comedy
- Subjects: Religion, politics, current events, pop culture, human sexuality, libertarianism
- Website: www.magnusbetner.com

Magnus Lennarth Betnér (born 16 August 1974 in Stockholm) is a Swedish comedian, social critic and television host. His material largely consists of discussing society, religion and politics such as feminism and liberalism.

He has been acting in Swedish comedy shows such as Parlamentet, 100%, Veckans nyheter, Extra! Extra!, Stockholm live and in 2008 he made his own show called I ditt ansikte (In your Face). He has focused on his own 90-minute stand-up shows since then, with his 4th big tour playing over the winter 2011/2012. He is the only Swedish comedian to be awarded the "Swedish comedian of the year" award twice, in 2005 and 2010. With the 2010 award he was recognized as "the greatest in Sweden and on his way to becoming great in the United Kingdom".

Betnér has been performing increasingly in English, in the US, UK and Ireland. In August 2010 Betnér performed a complete run of hour-length shows in English at The Stand Comedy Club during the Edinburgh Festival Fringe, receiving praise in mostly four star reviews.

In 2012, Betnér hosted his own show on Kanal 5 called Betnér Direkt, which was inspired by shows like Real Time with Bill Maher and The Daily Show with Jon Stewart where Betnér discussed current events with a panel and a guest.

== Early life ==
Betnér was born in Stockholm, son of Lennarth Betnér, then pastor in the Swedish Mission Church and mother, Susanne Betnér née Bergman, then a housewife, now works at HSB. Because of his father's work Betnér moved around lot when he grew up. He lived in Idre, Sala and Vingåker before they moved back to Stockholm at age 14.

== Comic style ==
Betnér uses dark comedy, often offensively, against Swedish celebrities such as Linda Rosing, Ebba von Sydow, Mikael Persbrandt, Per Gessle and many more. His stand-up comedy has garnered him much criticism and even death threats from Swedish neo-Nazis and rappers, but he finds it humorous that people can get so angry about jokes.

Betnér often has to answer questions on why he is so offensive. He often replies that people should accept the jokes, since they are only jokes.

Betnér was awarded the "Swedish comedian of the year" award in 2005 and again in 2010 in connection with the Swedish stand-up gala. Betnér's characteristic humour is often political and provocative; for example, in one show, he proposed to give his daughter a "pussy piercing" as a present for her second birthday, but ultimately opted against it, citing "why would you buy a pussy piercing for your two-year-old daughter? It would grow shut in a couple of weeks!" as the reason.

Betnér has also released four DVD movies: Live från Norra Brunn (Live from Norra Brunn), Magnus Betnér UnCut, Inget är heligt (Nothing is sacred) and Tal till nationen (Speech to the nation). He later chose to discontinue appearing in the program Extra! Extra!, as he considered himself censored when they would not allow him to joke about Runar Søgaard. He has been visiting the TV programs Robins, Förkväll and Belinda. In the autumn of 2008, Betnér's own TV program I ditt ansikte (In your face) was broadcast on Channel 5 in Sweden. After that Betnér went on to make a permanent contribution to SVT's Debatt (Debate).

== Personal life ==
Betnér lives with Helena Sandklef and has a daughter, Lina (born in 2005) from a previous marriage. Because of Betnér's dislike for tabloid newspapers, he almost never exposes himself in the media, but in some of his old acts he talked about his daughter. Sometimes when it comes to Christianity he refers to his father who is a pastor. Betnér however is an outspoken atheist and considers the world to be better off without religion. He is bisexual and he believes that most people are.

== Discography ==
- Live från Norra Brunn (Live from Norra Brunn) (2006) (DVD)
- Magnus Betnér Uncut (2007) (DVD)
- Inget är heligt (Nothing is Sacred) (2007) (DVD)
- Tal till Nationen (Speech to the Nation) (2009) (DVD)
- Livets ord (Word of Life) (2010) (DVD)
- Magnus Betnér IV (2012) (Digital Download)

== Filmography ==
=== Film ===
- Kung Fury (2015)

=== Television ===
- I ditt ansikte (2008)
- Betnér Direkt (2012)

Appearances in other shows

- Parlamentet (2003–present)
- Stockholm live (2005–2007, 2 episodes)
- Extra! Extra! (2006)
- 100% (2006)
- Veckans nyheter (2006)
- Sverige dansar och ler (2007, 3 episodes)
- Debatt (2008)
