= NileCity 105,6 =

- Title screen
- Genre: Comedy
- Directed by: Walter Söderlund
- Starring: Robert Gustafsson; Johan Rheborg; Henrik Schyffert
- Opening theme: Up Where We Belong
- Ending theme: Dream Come True
- Country of origin: Sweden
- Original language: Swedish
- No. of seasons: 1
- No. of episodes: 6

Production
- Producer: Tommy Bennwik
- Running time: 30 minutes

Original release
- Network: SVT
- Release: 17 January – 22 February 1995

Related
- I manegen med Glenn Killing; Percy tårar

NileCity 105,6 was a Swedish 6-part television show broadcast by Sveriges Television in 1995. It was the first major success of the Swedish comedy group Killinggänget. Each episode was titled "Vuxna män gör saker tillsammans" ("Grown up men do things together").

Set in Stockholm, the show revolves around the low-budget radio station NileCity 105,6, its staff and a number of related characters. It is owned and run by Percy Nilegård who rents a few rooms in a fire station. (Exterior shots featured the 19th-century Katarina fire station in central Stockholm.) The radio station is not very popular, and in the first episode it is actually said to be broadcast on AM radio instead of FM.

Primary characters include:

- Glenn Killing (Henrik Schyffert) - The main host of NileCity. He mainly plays the straight man to his outlandish guests (played by Robert Gustafsson)
- Percy Nilegård (Johan Rheborg) - The greedy owner who tries to turn a profit in spite of the station's very low ratings. To this end he runs a number of dubious schemes, such as airing advertisements for companies and asking them for payments afterwards (a concept which he calls "marketing by not asking any questions first").
- Veiron (Robert Gustafsson) - A stereotype of a socialist blue collar worker from Gothenburg. He hosts his own show where he pesters people trying to sleep. His show airs at 3:30 AM and he arrives at the studio during the night in a forklift. This is the first show of the day but in the context of the series it caps off each episode, with Veiron's monologue blending into the credits.
- Farbror Barbro (Johan Rheborg) - A counselor of unclear sexual identity (the name translates to "Uncle Barbara"), always dressed in a velour jumpsuit, who tends to ignore actual problems in favor of marketing hi-fi equipment.
- Greger (Robert Gustafsson) - A homosexual fire chief dressed in a plaid kilt. He has a secret crush on Percy.
- The firemen - A number of barechested hunks who are quite philosophical about their masculinity. Each episode begins with an introduction to one of them, set to the sound of "Up Where We Belong" by Joe Cocker and Jennifer Warnes.
