= Lasse Eriksson =

Swedish comedian, actor and writer

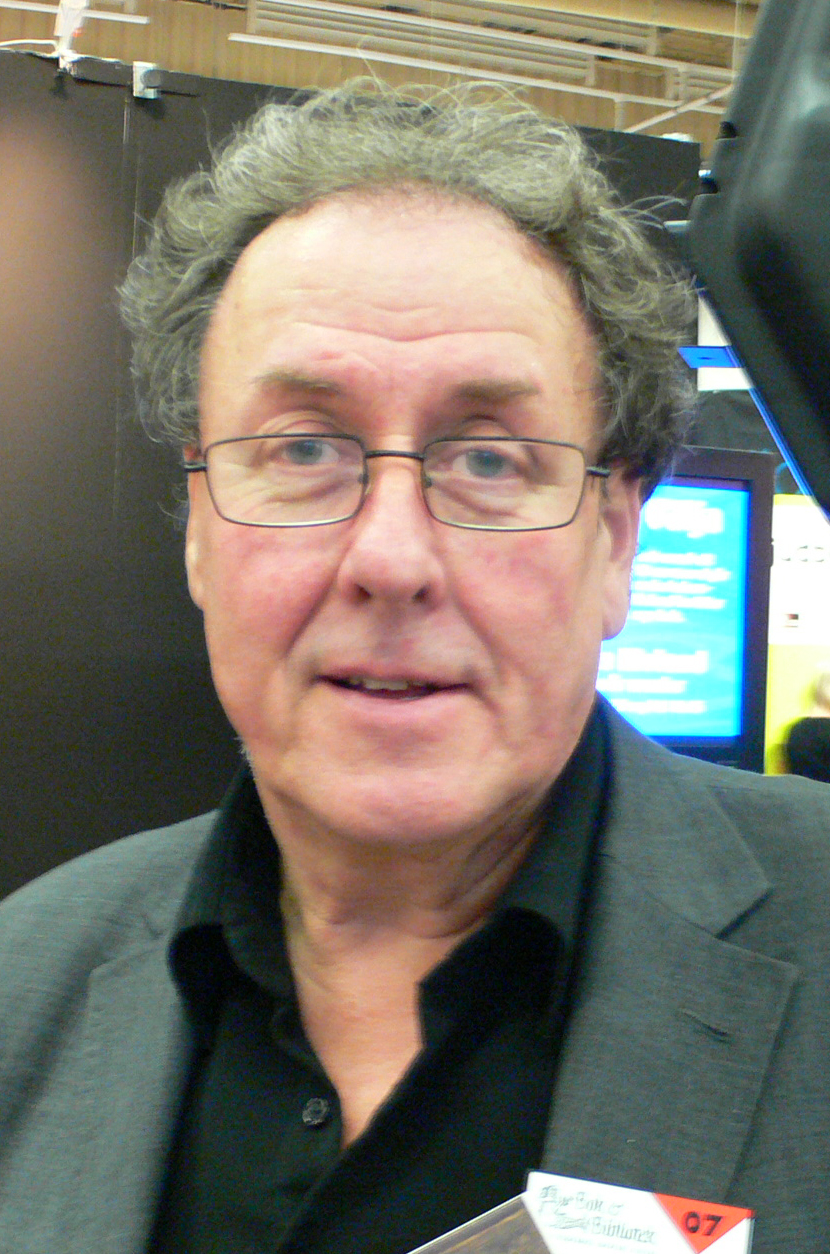
- Lasse Eriksson in October 2007
- Born: Lars Gunnar Eriksson; 1 April 1949; Piteå, Sweden
- Died: 3 March 2011 (aged 61); Uppsala, Sweden

Comedy career
- Genres: Stand-up, revue
- Website: Lasseeriksson

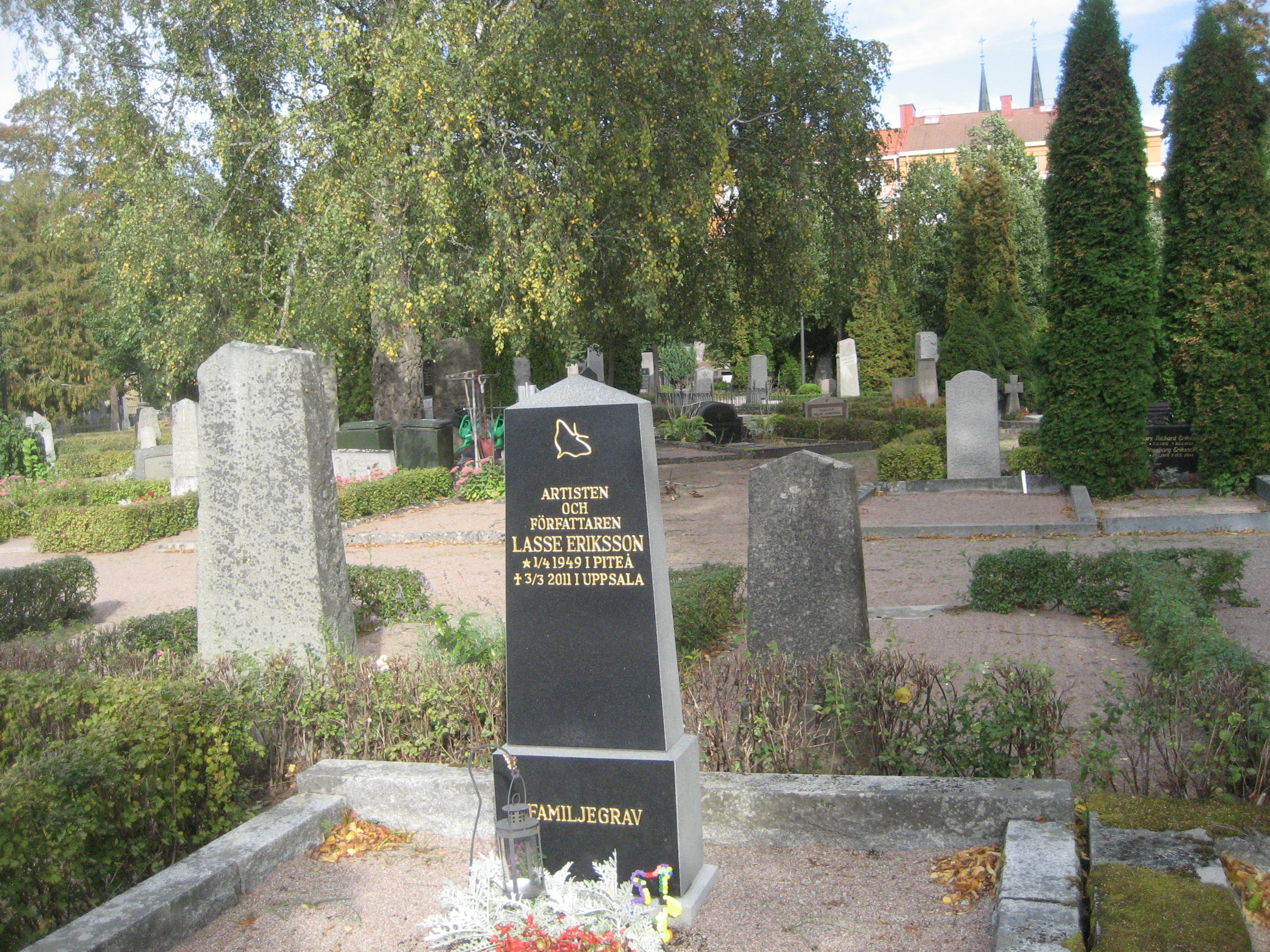
Lasse Eriksson's grave at Uppsala Cemetery in September 2014.

Lars Gunnar "Lasse" Eriksson (1 April 1949 – 3 March 2011) was a Swedish comedian, actor and writer.

Eriksson was born in Piteå, Sweden. He took a Bachelor of Arts in economic history before he initiated a theatrical career in the 1970s, when he played at the Panic Theatre in Uppsala. With a brass band in 1983, he did the show Vad varje kvinna bör veta om män (What every woman should know about men). In 1984, he became known to TV audiences with his personal contemplations in Dagsedlar (Daily pages), which were brief five-minute episodes accompanied by the dog Hillman. In 1985–86, he was the presenter of Café Luleå and in 2002, he was the team commander in Snacka om nyheter (News talk). Eriksson was also part of the original 1999 panel of Parlamentet, where he teamed with Annika Lantz in the red party.

Eriksson rose to fame mainly as a stand-up comedian. He also composed and wrote several songs, among the best known is Stället, a stylish reflection on rural people's everyday thoughts. In 1992, Eriksson participated in the stand-up revue Spik at the Vasa Theatre, and worked with Iwa Boman on the shows Jägare och jungfrur, typ (Hunters and maidens, sort of) (1995) and Är du för eller emot EMU (Are you for or against EMU) (2000). For many years, one could hear Eriksson at the radio program Telespånarna at Sveriges Radio P4 on Sunday mornings.

Eriksson died 3 March 2011 on stage during the show Fyra lyckliga män 2 (Four happy men 2) at the Regina Theatre in Uppsala.

== Bibliography ==
Lasse Eriksson was quite productive and released a number of own works, besides his cooperations on numerous anthologies:

- Kalla fakta om Piteå, in cooperation with Ronny Eriksson (1990)
- Slipsen från vildmarken (1994)
- Underbara tilldragelser i råttans år (1995)
- I våra kvarter – Piteå på 60-talet (1996)
- Fortsverige: Antologi kring en allt snabbare tid (1999)
- Boken om Gerda (2001)
- Jag har kokat tvåhundratusen potatisar – men kan inte erinra mig en enda av dessa (2003)
- Boken om Sofi (2003)
- Djur – inom och utom oss (2004)
- Gode Gud, ge mig tålamod, men gör det fort (2005)
- De norrbottniska satansverserna (2006)
- I huvudet på en orolig komiker (2007)

== Discography ==
Lasse Eriksson produced many of his albums and appeared on other artists' productions:

- Fyra lyckliga män
- Palt fiction
- Breda vägen
- Vad varje kvinna bör veta om män
- 100 svenska visor
- Ståupp
