= André Wickström =

Finnish comedian

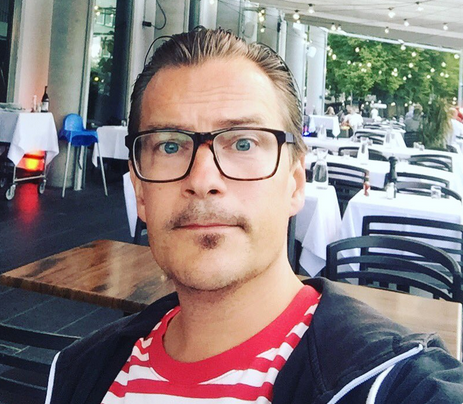
- Born: 11 February 1976 (age 50); Sipoo, Eastern Uusimaa, Finland

André Wickström (born 11 February 1976 in Sipoo, Eastern Uusimaa, Finland) is a Finland Swedish comedian and actor, performing in both the Swedish and the Finnish language.

== Biography ==
Wickström was born in Paipis in Sipoo east of Helsinki. His debut as a stand-up comedian came in 1995 and he got his degree from the Theatre Academy in 1999. In 2003, thanks to the TV show W-Tyyli, Wickström reached a broad audience in Finland. In W-Tyyli Wickström portrayed a fictional talk-show host in a documentary fashion preparing the evenings show by welcoming and pre-pepping actual celebrities for the evenings show. The format of W-tyyli was sold to multiple countries including Britain and Belgium.

Wickström has later appeared more and more on Swedish television instead. In 2006, Wickström was one of the hosts of the TV show Veckans nyheter on Kanal 5 in Sweden. Since 2007 he is also a panelist in the popular Swedish TV-program Parlamentet. In 2008 he was a frequent guest in the Swedish TV comedy Morgonsoffan.

Helsinki comedy clubs Club Viirus and The Comedy Kitchen are both launched by Wickström.
