= Malou von Sivers =

Swedish journalist and television host

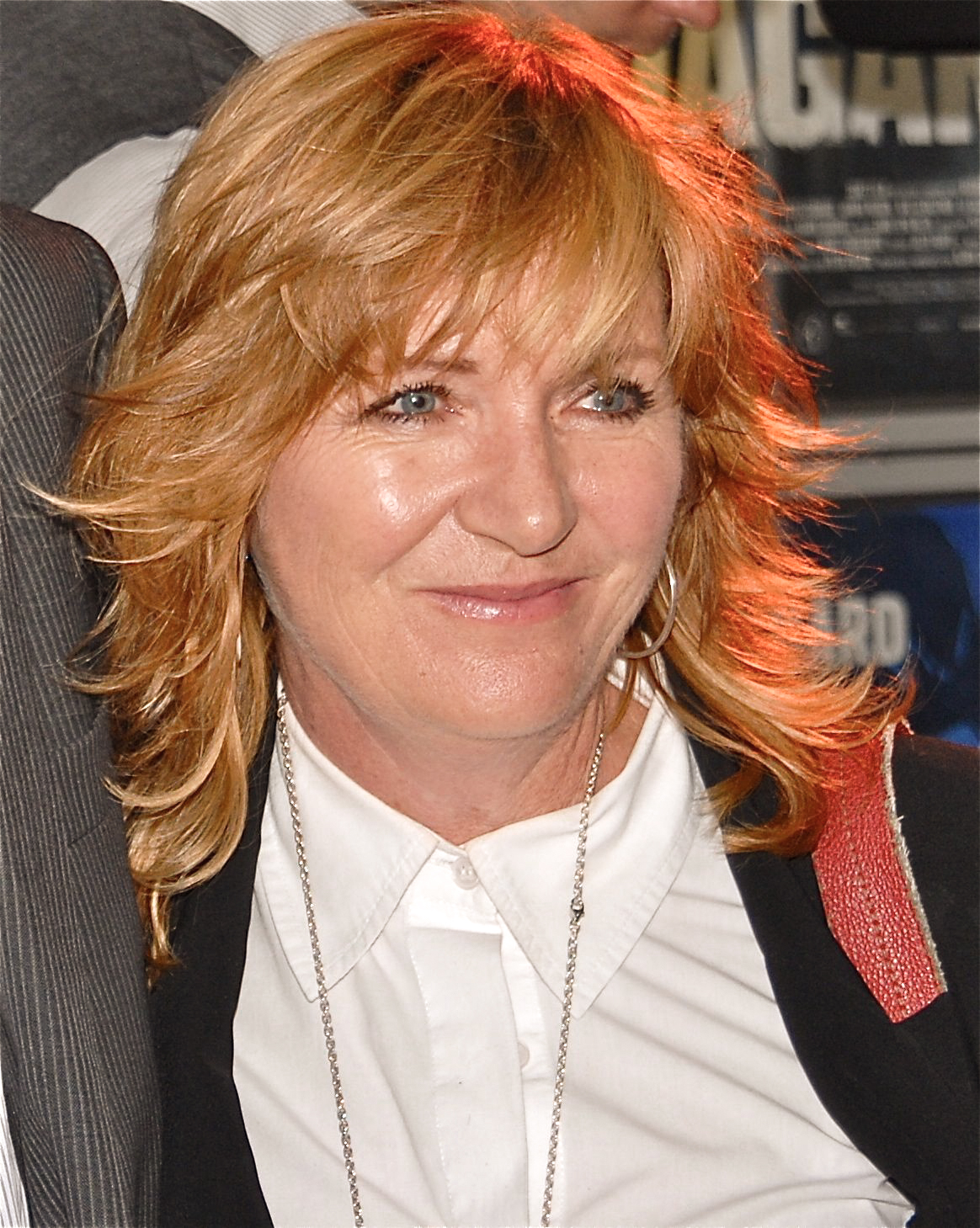
- von Sivers in 2011
- Born: Marie-Louise von Sivers; 15 January 1953 (age 73); Stockholm, Sweden
- Occupations: Television presenter, journalist
- Years active: 1990–present
- Spouse: Steen Haage (m. 1993)
- Children: 3
- Relatives: Gustaf von Sivers (paternal grandfather); Nimrod Dahlström (maternal grandfather)

Marie-Louise "Malou" von Sivers (born 15 January 1953) is a Swedish journalist and television host, working mostly for TV4.

She has a background in newspaper reporting both for Aftonbladet and Expressen where she did several noted wallraff and reports, often with a feminist angle.

In 1987, von Sivers started Elle in Sweden and was the editor in chief, and in 1990 she was one of the first employees on the then newly founded TV4. In the show Malou möter... which she started presenting in 1998 she met some of the world's most famous people for exclusive interviews. Between 2003 and 2004 she presented the live interview show Hetluft along with Lennart Ekdahl. Malou von Sivers is since 2006 the presenter of the talkshow Efter tio. She has also previously been the presenter for the morning show Nyhetsmorgon, and in 2007 she was one of the celebrity dancers in the second season of Let's Dance on TV4.

In 2014, she was awarded Lukas Bonniers stora journalistpris for her work in the field of journalism.
