= SNN News =

Swedish television program

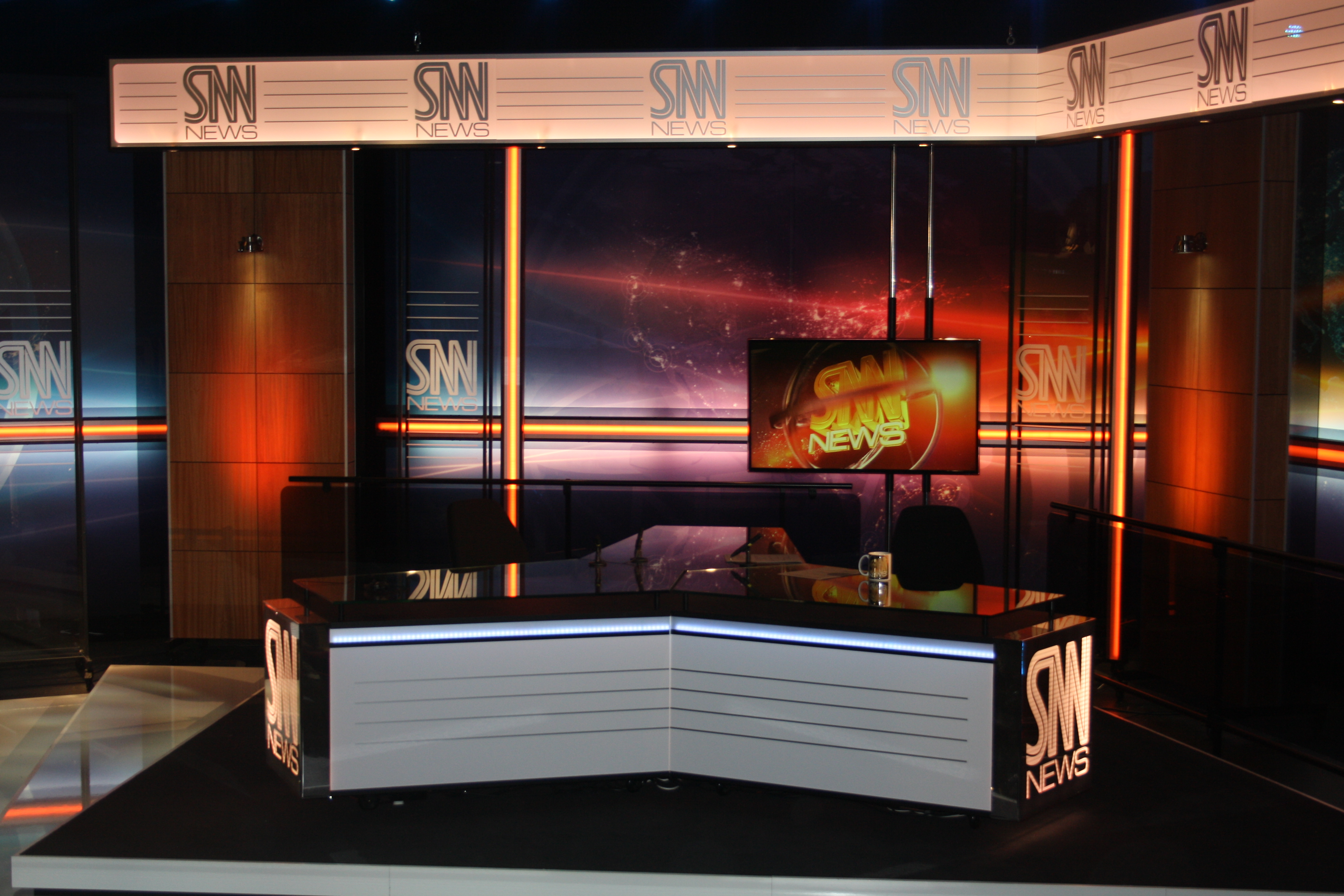
- Genre: Comedy
- Presented by: Mikael Tornving
- Starring: Sissela Benn; Anna Blomberg; David Hellenius; Peter Magnusson; Rachel Mohlin
- Country of origin: Sweden
- Original language: Swedish
- No. of seasons: 2
- No. of episodes: 18

Production
- Running time: 21 minutes
- Production company: Jarowski

Original release
- Network: TV4
- Release: October 18, 2013

SNN News is a Swedish news-parody show starring Mikael Tornving as the news anchor. The show aired on TV4 October 18, 2013. Reporters are David Hellenius, Peter Magnusson, Anna Blomberg, Rachel Mohlin and Sissela Benn. In every report a celebrity is participating as guest reporter.

== Episodes ==
=== Season 1 (2013) ===
No. overall	No. in season	Guest reporter	Original release date	Viewers
1	1	Anders Jansson	18 October 2013	905,000
2	2	Felix Herngren	25 October 2013	868,000
3	3	Per Andersson	1 November 2013	776,000
4	4	Peter Magnusson	8 November 2013	730,000
5	5	Robert Gustafsson	18 November 2013	409,000
6	6	Annika Andersson	22 November 2013	739,000
7	7	Henrik Dorsin	29 November 2013	779,000
8	8	David Batra	6 December 2013	1,021,000

=== Season 2 (2014) ===
No. overall	No. in season	Guest reporter	Original release date	Viewers
9	1	Johan Glans	19 January 2014	635,000
10	2	Göran Gabrielsson	26 January 2014	455,000
11	3	Robert Gustafsson	2 February 2014	620,000
12	4	Björn Kjellman	9 February 2014	620,000
13	5	Johan Ulveson	16 February 2014	475,000
14	6	Robert Gustafsson	23 February 2014	523,000
15	7	Robert Gustafsson	2 March 2014	644,000
16	8	David Batra	9 March 2014	488,000
17	9	Robert Gustafsson	16 March 2014	416,000
18	10	Sissela Kyle	23 March 2014	444,000
