= Annika Lantz =

Swedish radio host, comedian and television presenter

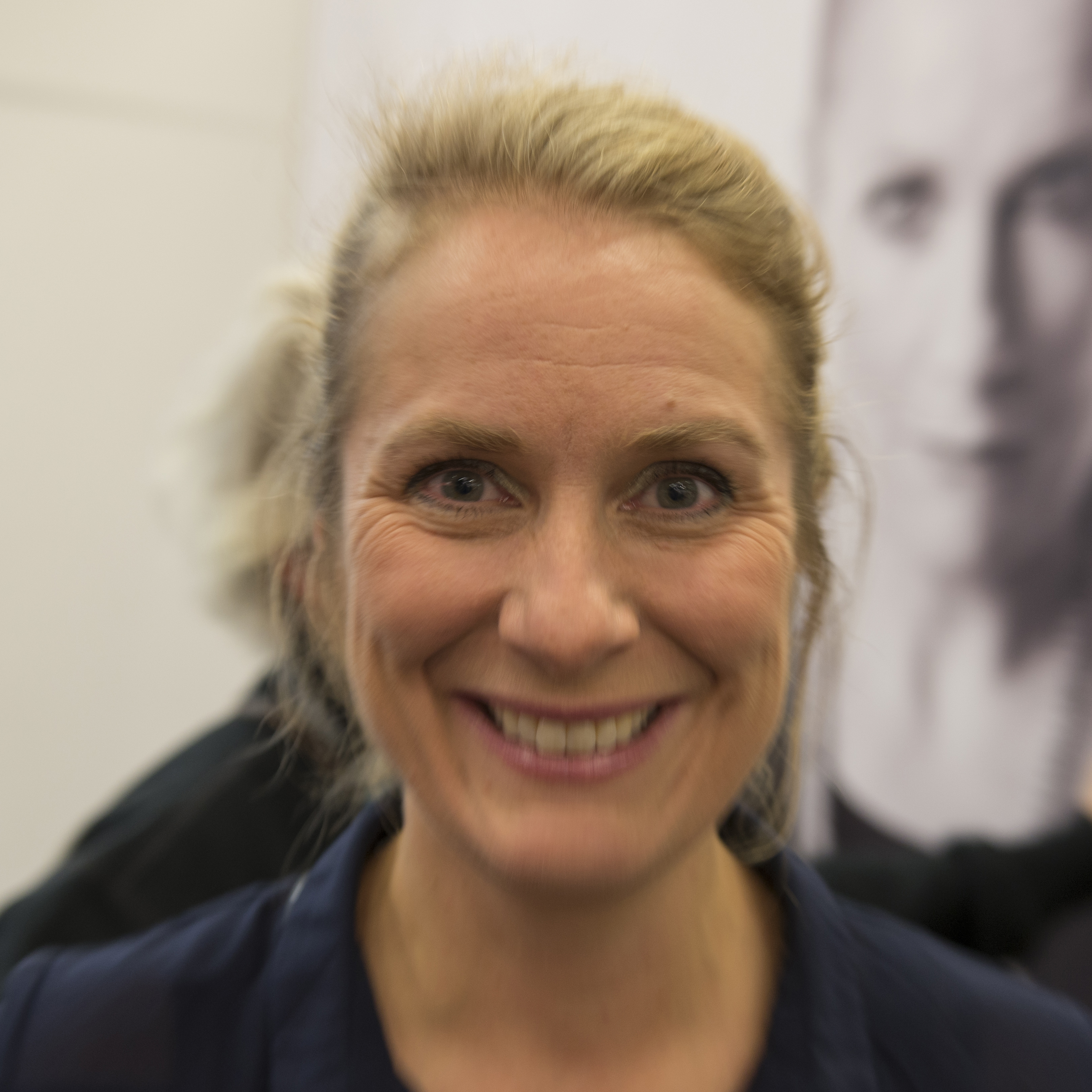
- Lantz in 2013
- Born: Annika Maria Lantz; 9 March 1968 (age 58); Hägersten, Sweden
- Occupations: Television presenter, comedian, radio host
- Spouse: Tomas Granryd
- Children: 2

Annika Maria Lantz (born 9 March 1968) is a Swedish radio host, comedian and television presenter. She has worked at Sveriges Radio since 1993 when she started hosting a local radio show for Stockholm P5. She has since worked in the P3 shows Kvällspasset, Morgonpasset and her own show Lantz i P3 which was also broadcast on SVT for some time. The show has since been moved to both P1 and P4. Lantz has also done her own talkshow on SVT called I Afton Lantz. She's been a panel member on the TV4 comedy show Parlamentet. Lantz is currently hosting the radioshow Lantzkampen.
