= Killinggänget =

Swedish comedy group

Killinggänget (English: "The Killing Gang") was a Swedish comedy group active on television in the 1990s through to around 2008.

== History ==
Killinggänget formed in 1991. The comedy troupe is named after Glenn Killing, a character played by Henrik Schyffert, who appeared in many of their shows. They last performed together around 2008. The group was notable for their evolution from straight comedy to comedy drama, a concept they have referred to as "brown comedy". It has been criticized for its stereotypical portrayal of East Asians.

In 2023, Sveriges Television aired a three-part series called Berättelsen om Killinggänget (The story of the Killing Gang), telling the story of their career.

== The Gang ==
The group consists of:

- Robert Gustafsson
- Jonas Inde - Left in 2004.
- Andres Lokko - Writes material but almost never appeared on stage/screen.
- Martin Luuk - Writes material but almost never appeared on stage/screen.
- Johan Rheborg
- Henrik Schyffert

=== Directors ===
- Walter Söderlund (1991-1999)
- Tomas Alfredson (2000-2008?)

== Characters ==
- Glenn Killing, the namesake of the group. Played by Henrik Schyffert, he has appeared in most of their TV shows (along with his boss Percy Nilegård) and also serves as the host for their live performances.
- Percy Nilegård, played by Johan Rheborg. A vain, snobbish, and possibly insane capitalist with a noticeable underbite, he does almost everything to earn money while also promoting his own ideas of good taste which usually involve a conservative and racist view of society.
- Tommy Bohlin, played by Jonas Inde. A simple and somewhat dim-witted heavy metal fan, he usually plays the part of assistant to more important characters.
- Farbror Barbro (Uncle Barbro), played by Johan Rheborg. A guidance counselor (presumably male, despite having a female name) who tends to ignore actual problems in favor of marketing hi-fi equipment.
- Weiron, played by Robert Gustafsson. A stereotype of a socialist blue collar worker from Gothenburg, He hosts his own early morning show on Nilecity 105,6 where he pesters people trying to sleep.
- Fred Asp, played by Robert Gustafsson. A drunk who has made an act out of "partying" with his stuffed ferret Göran.

== Productions ==
=== TV ===
The group's television shows included:

- 1992 - I manegen med Glenn Killing
- 1995 - Nilecity 105,6
- 1996 - Percy tårar
- 1999 - Fyra små filmer: Gunnar Rehlin, Ben & Gunnar, På sista versen and Screwed in Tallinn

=== Stage ===
- 1995 - I manegen med Glenn Killing - Live från Berns
- 2000 - Glenn Killing på Grand

=== Film ===
- 2004 - Four Shades of Brown

=== Internet ===
- Spermaharen
