= Agatha Christie's Hjerson =

- Genre: Mystery; Crime drama
- Created by: Patrik Gyllström
- Based on: Ariadne Oliver by Agatha Christie
- Directed by: Lisa James Larsson; Lisa Farzaneh
- Starring: Johan Rheborg; Hanna Alström
- Composer: Joel Danell
- Country of origin: Sweden
- Original language: Swedish
- No. of seasons: 1
- No. of episodes: 8

Production
- Running time: 44 minutes
- Production companies: C More; TV4; B-Reel Films; ZDF; Nadcon Film; Ålands Landskapsregering; Agatha Christie Ltd.

Original release
- Network: C More; TV4
- Release: 16 August – 6 September 2021

Agatha Christie's Hjerson is a Swedish mystery television series starring Johan Rheborg as the title character, loosely based on Agatha Christie's minor metafictional character Sven Hjerson. This is the first time a secondary character from Agatha Christie’s stories has been adapted into a television series.

== Background ==
In Christie's novels, Hjerson is the protagonist of a popular series of in-universe murder mysteries written by Ariadne Oliver, a self-parody of Christie herself, whilst Hjerson, an eccentric Finnish detective noted for his vegetarianism, functions as a pastiche of Christie's main protagonist, Belgian detective Hercule Poirot.

== Premise ==
Struggling Swedish reality TV producer Klara Sandberg (loosely based on Oliver) pitches a true crime series starring the formerly celebrated Hjerson, who has since become a recluse for mysterious reasons. Determined to get him to sign on, Klara inserts herself into Hjerson's routine, only to be present when a murder occurs on a boat they are both travelling on. Following that investigation, the two become an unlikely sleuthing duo as further mysteries follow.

Departing from his literary counterpart, Hjerson is presented as hailing from the Åland islands. He is bisexual, vegan (with a fondness for crudités) and adheres to strict and specific routines including cold winter swims.

== Cast ==
- Johan Rheborg as Sven Hjerson
- Hanna Alström as Klara Sandberg
- Maria Lundqvist as Majvor
- David Fukamachi Regnfors as Niklas
- Björn Andrésen as Oscar
- Peter Kanerva as Frank
- Maja Söderström as Olivia

== Episodes ==
The series consists of eight episodes, covering four stories across two parts each.
