= Wallraf =

Wallraf is a surname. Notable people with the surname include:

- Ferdinand Franz Wallraf (1748–1824), German botanist, mathematician, theologian, art collector and Roman Catholic priest
- Max Wallraf (1859–1941), German politician who served as mayor of Cologne from 1907 to 1917

== See also ==
- Wallraff, a surname
