= Mikael Tornving =

Swedish comedian, actor and television presenter

- Born: 15 February 1961 (age 64)
- Notable works and roles: Parlamentet

Mikael Tornving (born 15 February 1961) is a Swedish comedian, actor and television presenter.

Tornving was born in Östersund and studied personal and worklife at Uppsala University. He is best known as a comedian in the TV4 panel show Parlamentet, and as the character Rolf Nygård as a travelling reporter in Melodifestivalen 2005 during the semi-finals. The character was also seen in the show Godafton Sverige broadcast by SVT. In 2006, Tornving participated in the comedy series Playa del Sol at SVT. His first film role came in 2006 in a cameo in the film Frostbiten as a police officer that tries to arrest a vampire. He also plays the role of Patrik Agrell in the films about Johan Falk.

In 2007, Tornving took part in the musical Little Shop of Horrors which was done at the Halmstad teater. In 2013, he participated in the musical Priscilla, Queen of the Desert at Göta Lejon in Stockholm. In the summer of 2008, Tornving toured with Rhapsody in Rock, he also presented an episode of the Sveriges Radio show Sommar i P1 where he told about his life and achievements. In 2014, he presented the comedy news show SNN News at TV4 as the "official presenter" of the news show.

He has previously been a reserve-officer at the Jämtlands fältjägarregemente in Östersund.
