= Cissi Elwin Frenkel =

Swedish journalist and television presenter

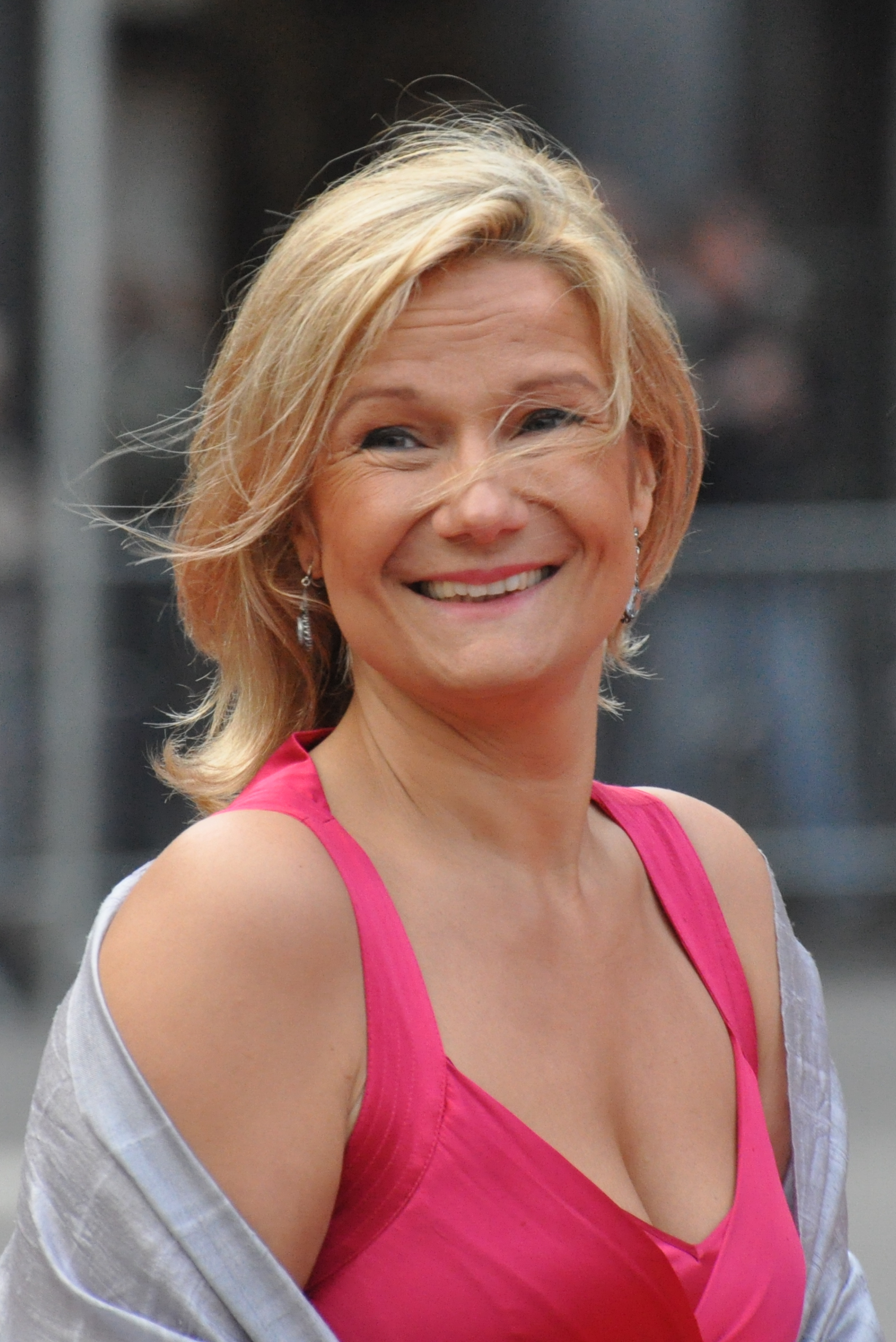
- Frenkel at the Princess Victorias wedding in 2010
- Born: 1 June 1965 (age 59); Stockholm, Sweden
- Occupation(s): Journalist, television presenter

Cecilia "Cissi" Elwin Frenkel (née Elwin; born 1 June 1965) is a Swedish journalist, television presenter and executive.

== Biography ==
She was early on a journalist for SVT and Expressen and, along with Martin Timell, the first presenter of the SVT youth show Bullen. Between 2000 and 2006, she was the editor-in-chief for Icakuriren and in 2006 she became the publication chief for the media corporation Forma Publishing Group.

In 2003, she was the host for an episode of the Sveriges Radio show Sommar i P1.

On 25 March 2006, she became the CEO of Svenska filminstitutet, a post she held until 2010.

== Personal life ==
Frenkel is in a relationship with the director Tomas Alfredson and the couple have two children together.
