= Veckans nyheter =

2006 Swedish television programme

Veckans nyheter is a Swedish satirical news and sketch comedy television program that aired on Kanal 5 for two seasons in 2006. Henrik Schyffert hosted the first season, with André Wickström taking over for season two.
