= Wallraff =

Wallraff is a German surname. Notable people with the surname include:

- Andreas Wallraff, German quantum physicist
- Cuco Wallraff (born 1963), German actor who has appeared on Rote Rosen
- Günter Wallraff (born 1942), German writer and undercover journalist

== See also ==
- Wallraf, a surname
