= Four Shades of Brown =

- Theatrical release poster
- Directed by: Tomas Alfredson
- Written by: Tomas Alfredson; Robert Gustafsson; Jonas Inde; Andres Lokko; Martin Luuk; Johan Rheborg; Henrik Schyffert
- Produced by: Caisa Westling
- Starring: Robert Gustafsson; Johan Rheborg; Henrik Schyffert; Jonas Inde; Maria Kulle; Ulf Brunnberg
- Cinematography: Leif Benjour
- Edited by: Louise Brattberg
- Production company: Sveriges Television
- Distributed by: AB Svensk Filmindustri
- Release dates: 25 January 2004 (Gothenburg Film Festival); 30 January 2004
- Running time: 192 minutes
- Country: Sweden
- Language: Swedish

Four Shades of Brown (Swedish: Fyra nyanser av brunt) is a 2004 Swedish film written by the comedy group Killinggänget and directed by their member Tomas Alfredson. The film stars Robert Gustafsson, Johan Rheborg, Henrik Schyffert, Jonas Inde, Maria Kulle and Ulf Brunnberg. The film consists of four interwoven stories about life tragedies, each related to fatherhood as the common theme. It was produced by Sveriges Television.

The film won four Guldbagge Awards including Best Director and Best Actor for Gustafsson. In 2005 it was aired on television as four mid-length television films, which had been reedited with additional footage.

== Plot ==
The stories are interwoven in the film version, though each is completely unconnected to the others. In the television version, each story constitutes one episode and works as an independent television film, varying in length between 40 and 60 minutes.

Landins (The Landins)

Christer Landin, the father in a family living in a community in Scania, southern Sweden, tries to motivate his son who is falling behind in school by bringing him to his workplace as a pet cremator. Accidentally, the son turns on the crematory oven just in the wrong moment and the father is severely burned. Life still has to go on, and while the son is feeling guilty, the father goes through rehabilitation where he learns to speak again and befriends other local people also suffering from speech disabilities.

En dålig idé (A bad idea)

Richard Brunn, a man with a lifetime subscription to the magazine Wallpaper*, is together with his wife opening a top designed beachside hotel. They are visited by Richard's parents who work as stage magicians. The parents bring an easy-going Dane and a wooden statuette representing a former minister, which Richard finds to be extremely tasteless, and which triggers a mental breakdown.

Min sista vilja (My last will)

The deceased Sören H. Lindberg, an equally eccentric as successful harness racing driver and trainer from Dalarna, has left a bizarre will demanding various acts and arrangements to be performed at his funeral. As his three sons and countless mistresses are gathered, the sorrow and confusion is processed, and everybody is curious of who will inherit which part of his wealth. Eventually it turns out that all money has been spent on a hologram of Lindberg telling them that he used the money to create the hologram. Furthermore, his best horse is given away to the National Estonian Trotting Association without any explanation.

Pappas lilla tjockis (Dad's little fatso)

A cooking class in Gothenburg develops into a therapy session for lost souls. Johan is unable to get really close to anyone, including his wife, and keeps telling lies about his progress to the group. Ernst is dysfunctional and unable to get a job, and shifts between feeling very charismatic and like a total misfit. Jenny feels bad about not being able to keep herself from using irony and sarcasm to hurt people who don't understand when she's serious and when she's not. Olle is troubled by the breakup of his marriage.

== Cast ==
Landins

- Robert Gustafsson as Christer Landin
- Maria Kulle as Anna Landin
- Karl Linnertorp as Morgan Landin
- Jonas Inde as Ray
- Johan Rheborg as Kjell Levrén

En dålig idé

- Henrik Schyffert as Richard Brunn
- Anna Björk as Tove Brunn
- Iwar Wiklander as Jan-Erik, "Kim"
- Karin Ekström as Smulan, "Kelly"
- Finn Nielsen as Perikles
- Fyr Thorwald as Raimo Keskinen

Min sista vilja

- Jonas Inde as Tony
- Anders Johannisson as Kenneth
- Oskar Thunberg as Mikael
- Elisabet Carlsson as Johanna
- Conny Linnteg as Sören H. Lindberg

Pappas lilla tjockis

- Robert Gustafsson as Johan
- Johan Rheborg as Ernst
- Ulf Brunnberg as Olle
- Sofia Helin as Jenny
- Anna Ulrica Ericsson as Helen

== Production ==
The film was produced by Sveriges Television in co-production with Nordisk Film in Denmark. It received funding from the Swedish Film Institute and Nordisk Film- & TV-Fond. Principal photography took place at Sveriges Television's studios.

== Release ==
The film premiered on 25 January 2004 at the Gothenburg Film Festival. The regular Swedish premiere followed on 30 January. Theatrical screenings in Sweden included a 15-minute break in the middle. Also in January 2004, the film was screened in competition at the International Film Festival Rotterdam. The TV version premiered on 31 January 2005 with "Landins" which was followed by the other episodes with weekly intervals.

=== Reception ===
In Svenska Dagbladet, a film critic wrote: "Killinggänget defy expectations and make a serious film and simultaneously not. When their humour works best, like in the masterpiece Screwed in Tallinn, it is both satirical and heartbreaking at the same time. But the new film - or films - is several shades blacker." The critic strongly complimented the acting, directing and overall production values, but criticised the film for having poor interaction of its different parts: "Everything is there. Killinggänget could without problems have made four feature films from their material if they only had refined it. In its current form Four Shades of Brown becomes overkill on all levels. Both too long and too short simultaneously." Gunnar Rehlin reviewed the film for Variety and compared it to Roy Andersson's Songs from the Second Floor and Ulrich Seidl's Dog Days. Rehlin particularly complimented the acting performances of Robert Gustafsson, Johan Rheborg and Ulf Brunnberg, and called the film "a very good and very brave portrait in black of a country often seen as a model, caring society."

Four Shades of Brown won four Guldbagge Awards in 2005: Best Direction, Best Actor for Gustafsson, Best Actress for Maria Kulle and Best Supporting Actor for Brunnberg. It was also nominated for Best Film, Best Actor for Rheborg, Best Cinematography and Best Screenplay.
