= Hjälp! =

Swedish television series

Hjälp! (Swedish: Help!) was a Swedish situation comedy television series, broadcast on the TV4 network. It revolved around a psychologist, Jeanette Placzycks, played by Stina Ekblad, who treated patients with a variety of problems.

The series had three seasons, and it was broadcast in 2007 — 2009. According to TV4, the first season had peak viewing figures of more than 1.5 million viewers.

The first season of the programme was reported to the Swedish Broadcasting Commission for treating a stuttering person as an amusing caricature in a way that ridiculed and humiliated people with the disability. The commission ruled that since the entire TV show presented exaggerated caricatures of mental issues and other disabilities, which were not intended to be taken seriously, the specific situations mentioned in the report did not violate the Swedish Radio and Television Act.

The American actor Chevy Chase had a recurring part as a foreign correspondent in the third season of the series.

== Cast ==
- Stina Ekblad as Jeanette Placzycks, psychologist and the show's protagonist.
- Johan Rheborg as Örjan Lax
- Felix Herngren as Benjamin Turesson
- Hassan Brijany as Tito
- Johan Glans as Reine Bok
- Morgan Alling as Lars Magnus Ericsson
- Petra Mede as Viviann, Lars Magnus' wife.
- Anna Blomberg as Marina Huge
- Gustaf Hammarsten and Anna Petersson as Mats and Therese Bolling
- Per Andersson as Dagmar
- Chevy Chase as Dan Carter
- Robert Gustafsson as Papa Papadopolous
