= Tomas Alfredson =

Swedish film director (born 1965)

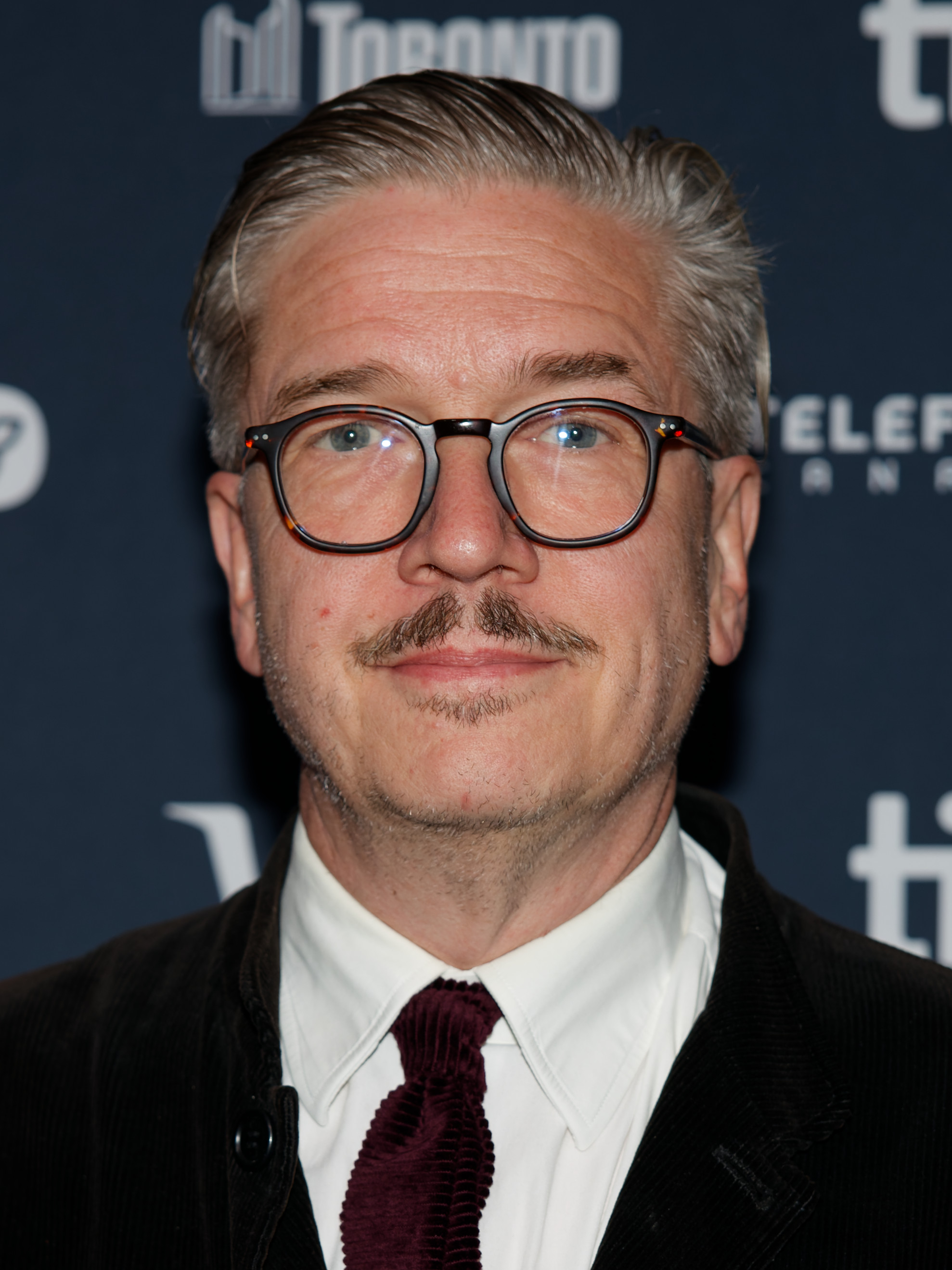
- Alfredson at the 2024 Toronto International Film Festival
- Born: 1 April 1965 (age 61); Stockholm, Sweden
- Occupations: Film director, actor
- Years active: 1971–present
- Father: Hans Alfredson
- Relatives: Daniel Alfredson (brother)

Tomas Alfredson (born 1 April 1965) is a Swedish film director who is best known internationally for directing the 2008 vampire film Let the Right One In and 2011 espionage film Tinker Tailor Soldier Spy. Alfredson has received the Guldbagge award for Best Direction twice; in 2005 for Four Shades of Brown, and in 2008 for Let the Right One In. His more recent work includes the 2025 television drama series Faithless (Trolösa), and as of 2026 Alfredson is directing an American film adaptation of the novel Séance on a Wet Afternoon.

He is the son of director and actor Hans Alfredson and the brother of director Daniel Alfredson.

== Early life ==
Tomas Alfredson was born on 1 April 1965 in Stockholm, Sweden, the son of Gunilla and comedian, writer, and director Hans "Hasse" Alfredson. Hasse was seldom home, and Tomas was mostly raised by his mother. "But I participated in [Hasse's] film productions every summer, it was probably a way for us to reach each other (...) I thought it was great fun."

Alfredson would often have minor roles in the Hasseåtage series of popular films, that featured the comedy-duo of his father and Tage Danielsson – such as the role of the "Count" in The Apple War (1971), his sole line of dialogue being "Adieu, mon plaisir" ("Goodbye, my pleasure").

He did not have any formal training in filmmaking.

== Career ==
Alfredson's career started at Svensk Filmindustri, where he worked as an assistant. He was involved in the creation of the Swedish television channel TV4, where he worked in the entertainment department. One of his successes was the Swedish adaptation of Fort Boyard, "Fångarna på Fortet". Alfredson then moved on to Sveriges Television, creating television series such as Ikas TV-kalas, a children's television show starring Ika Nord, who would later appear in Alfredson's 2008 film Let the Right One In. According to Nord, Alfredson was "only 25, but already extremely knowledgeable". In 1994 Alfredson directed Bert, another tv production based on the Bert diaries, a popular series of teenage novels written in the diary form. A feature film, Bert: The Last Virgin, based on the series was made in 1995, for which Alfredson received a Guldbagge nomination for Best Direction.

Alfredson joined the Swedish comedy group Killinggänget as a director in 1999. His first collaboration with the group was a 1999 series of four television films, including the mockumentary Screwed in Tallinn, which depicts a group of Swedish bachelors who travel to Estonia by bus in the hopes of finding Estonian girlfriends. The group made the 2004 film Four Shades of Brown, directed by Alfredson. The film intertwines four unrelated stories with a common theme of betrayal, in particular parents betraying their children. The film received four Guldbagge awards, including Best Direction for Alfredson.

Swedish author John Ajvide Lindqvist released his debut horror novel Let the Right One In in 2004. After reading the novel, Alfredson wanted to get involved in a film adaptation, and approached Lindqvist: "They [sic] was a crowd banging on his door to make a movie, so I was #40 or something. When we met, he knew of me and he liked what I'd done previously, and we got along together very well." The film tells the story of a 12-year-old bullied boy who befriends a child vampire in early 1980s Blackeberg, Sweden. In addition to directing, Alfredson edited the film in collaboration with Dino Jonsäter.

Let the Right One In premiered on 26 January 2008 at the Göteborg International Film Festival, where Alfredson won the Festival's Nordic Film Prize. The film went on to win additional awards, including the Founders Award for Best Narrative Feature at the Tribeca Film Festival. The film quickly became an international success, with the rights being sold to more than forty countries before its theatrical release on 24 October 2008. Domestically, the film won five Guldbagge Awards, with Alfredson receiving his second Guldbagge Award for Best Direction.

After finishing the work on Let the Right One In, Alfredson publicly announced that he would not make any more films in the "foreseeable future". He stated that he had grown tired of the Swedish film and television industry, which he considered "drained of power, courage, and gravity". While he had received several offers from Hollywood producers, he was reluctant to leave his "home, children and all the colleagues I depend on to be good". However, in March 2009 he announced that he would partake in a big international film production. In July 2009, Alfredson signed to direct a film adaptation of John le Carré's 1974 novel Tinker Tailor Soldier Spy. Produced by Working Title Films' Tim Bevan and Eric Fellner, it premiered in September 2011 at the 68th Venice International Film Festival.

In 2012, it was announced that Alfredson had acquired the rights to make a film adaptation of Astrid Lindgren's novel The Brothers Lionheart, with Alfredson planning to direct and John Ajvide Lindqvist to write the screenplay.

In 2017, Alfredson directed the widely panned The Snowman. Despite the all-star cast and it being based on a book from the popular series by Jo Nesbø, the movie was mostly panned by critics; only 7% of reviews aggregated by Rotten Tomatoes were positive.

Alfredson was executive producer of and directed the television drama series Faithless (Trolösa), based on the 2000 feature film Faithless, which was written by Ingmar Bergman and directed by Liv Ullmann. The six-part miniseries stars Gustav Lindh, Frida Gustavsson, Lena Endre (who starred in the original film), Jesper Christensen, and August Wittgenstein. Alfredson had approached Bergman with the idea of a TV soon after the film's release, which Bergman at first dismissed, but came around to thinking it was a good idea. The plot centres on a love triangle between two men and a woman, spanning two time periods, which required 6 different lead actors, who were cast by Alfredson. The script was written by Norwegian screenwriter Sara Johnsen and the soundtrack was written by Swedish musician Hans Ek. The series premiered on SVT on 26 January 2025, and was scheduled to be released on other platforms, including Apple TV. It was released on the free public television streaming service SBS on Demand in Australia in on 27 March 2025 and on SBS Television on 19 November 2026. It aired on Sky Atlantic and Now in the UK in July 2026, with The Times calling it "exquisitely done".

As of 2026 Alfredson is directing an film adaptation of the novel Séance on a Wet Afternoon.

== Personal life ==
Alfredson is the brother of film director Daniel Alfredson. He has two children with his ex-wife Cissi Elwin Frenkel, who was managing director of the Swedish Film Institute.

== Filmography ==
Director
Feature films
Year	English title	Original title	Other notes
1995	Bert: The Last Virgin	Bert: Den siste oskulden	Nominated – Guldbagge Award for Best Director
2003	Office Hours	Kontorstid	
2004	Four Shades of Brown	Fyra nyanser av brunt	With Killinggänget; Guldbagge Award for Best Director
2008	Let the Right One In	Låt den rätte komma in	Calgary International Film Festival Award for Best International Feature; Chicago Film Critics Association Award for Most Promising Filmmaker; Fantasia Film Festival Award for Best European/North – South American Film; Fantasia Film Festival Award for Best Film; Fantasia Film Festival Award for Best Director; Gérardmer Film Festival Critics Award; Gérardmer Film Festival Award for Best Film; Nordic Film Prize; Guldbagge Award for Best Director; London Film Critics' Circle Award for Best Foreign Language Film of the Year; Online Film Critics Award for Breakthrough Filmmaker; Tribeca Film Festival Award for Best Narrative Feature
2011	Tinker Tailor Soldier Spy		BAFTA Award for Best British Film; Dublin Film Critics Circle Awards for Top 10 Directors; Italy Screenplay Special Award for Best Director; Premio Cinema Ludus – Gran Prix for Best Film; Premio Cinema Ludus – Best European Director; Stockholm Film Festival FIPRESCI Award; YouMovie Award for Best Director; 4th place – Dublin Film Critics Circle Awards for Best Director; 9th place – Grand Prix FIPRESCI; Nominated – BAFTA Award for Best Director; Nominated – British Independent Film Award for Best Director; Nominated – Empire Award for Best Director; Nominated – British Film Bloggers Circle Award for Best Director; Nominated – Georgia Film Critics Association Award for Best Director; Nominated – Satellite Award for Best Director
2017	The Snowman		
2020	Se upp för Jönssonligan		
TBA	Séance on a Wet Afternoon		
Television
Year	English title	Original title	Other notes
1990	Ikas TV-kalas		
1994	Bert		
1999	Offer och gärningsmän		
1999	Fyra små filmer: Gunnar Rehlin, Ben & Gunnar, På sista versen and Screwed in Tallinn		With Killinggänget
2000	Soldiers by Moonlight	Soldater i månsken	
2005	En decemberdröm		Also known as Julkalendern 2005
2025	Faithless	Trolösa	Directed 6 episodes; also executive producer Based on the film Faithless
Other
Year	English title	Original title	Other notes
2001	Spermaharen		Internet project with Killinggänget
