= Two into One =

Two Into One
- Original language: English
- Written by: Ray Cooney
- Characters: 8
- Genre: Farce
- Setting: Hotel suite, Westminster

Premiere
- Date: 1981
- Place: Haymarket Theatre, Leicester

Two Into One is a farce written by English playwright Ray Cooney, which premiered in Leicester in 1981, then performed at Guildford in 1983, and then had a long run at the Shaftesbury Theatre in London from late 1984 to early 1986. Cooney both directed and acted in a 2014 production of the play in London, and it was also translated into Swedish as Hotelliggaren.

== Production history ==
Two Into One was first performed at the Haymarket Theatre, Leicester, on 19 March 1981. This production was directed by Roger Redfarn, and Cooney played the part of George Pigden.

Two years later it was performed at Guildford, Surrey, in a co-production by Theatre of Comedy and Yvonne Arnaud Theatre, from 11 May to 4 June 1983. This production was directed and produced by playwright Ray Cooney, with stage design by Terry Parsons. Cooney also played George Pigden, while Derek Waring played Richard Willey, Joyce Blair played Pamela Willey, Serretta Wilson played Jennifer Bristow, and Anthony Sharp played The Manager.

The play had a long run at the Shaftesbury Theatre from 15 October 1984 to 15 February 1986. It starred Donald Sinden in the lead role as The Right Hon Richard Willey, MP until Donald Hewlett took over the role temporarily from 18 March to 27 April 1985, and then Anton Rodgers for the final year. Michael Williams played George Pigden for the whole run apart from being temporarily replaced by Tom Conti from 18 March to 27 April 1985. Lionel Jeffries played The Manager, later temporarily replaced by Eric Sykes and then Moray Watson. Actresses included Linda Hayden, Serretta Wilson, Jane Downs, Angela Browne, and Barbara Murray. Playwright Ray Cooney also directed the production, and his Theatre of Comedy Company bought the theatre during the run.

Also during 1984–5, the play had a run in Canada, in a production by Ed and David Mirvish in association with Theatre of Comedy and Yvonne Arnaud Theatre, at the Royal Alexandra Theatre in Toronto.

In 1999 a film version of the play in Swedish, directed by Bo Hermansson and featuring Peter Haber, Suzanne Reuter, Hans V. Engström, Iwa Boman, and Johan Rheborg was released, titled Hotelliggaren. Hotelliggaren was also staged in 2012 by the amateur theatre group Vulkanteatern in Jönköping, Sweden.

In 2014, a production of Two into One directed by Cooney and also featuring the playwright as The Waiter, was staged by Menier Chocolate Factory, a theatre in Southwark, London, running from 8 March to 26 April. Michael Praed played Richard Willey, Josefina Gabrielle was Pamela Willey, and Nick Wilton played George Pigden.
