= I manegen med Glenn Killing =

1992 Swedish television program

- Also known as: In the ring with Glenn Killing
- Genre: Comedy
- Written by: Robert Gustafsson; Jonas Inde
- Directed by: Walter Söderlund
- Starring: Robert Gustafsson; Jonas Inde; Johan Rheborg; Henrik Schyffert
- Country of origin: Sweden
- Original language: Swedish

Production
- Running time: 220 minutes
- Production company: SVT Drama

Original release
- Network: SVT
- Release: 1992

I manegen med Glenn Killing ("In the ring with Glenn Killing") was a Swedish television show broadcast by SVT in 1992. It marked the television debut of Swedish comedy group Killinggänget.

The show's basic formula is (according to Killinggänget) borrowed from Vic Reeves Big Night Out, with some sketches stolen almost verbatim, but mostly different content and a set of original characters including Percy Nilegård.
