= Percy tårar =

- Country of origin: Sweden
- Original language: Swedish

Production
- Producer: Magdalena Jangard

Original release
- Network: SVT

Related
- Nilecity 105,6

Percy tårar (Percy’s Tears) is a Swedish 6-part television show broadcast by Sveriges Television in 1996. It was Killinggänget's follow-up to Nilecity 105,6. It was directed by Walter Söderlund and produced by Magdalena Jangard.

The series revolves around a number of mostly unrelated storylines which are told in segments in each episode. These segments are flanked by various stand-alone sketches that sometimes elaborate on minor characters.

== Plot ==
The primary storyline concerns Percy Nilegård (Johan Rheborg), who has gone into psychotherapy, where he meets Dr J. Tull, which may not be his real name, and reveals how he took over another person's life to make money. Percy feels lonely and wants Dr. Tull to help him write his memoir. Their conversation then shifts to a series of flashbacks in which Percy relates the story of how he exploited the new boss of an old family-run brewery.

Other storylines include:

- Christer Fuglesang tries to become the first Swede in space but has to deal with his extremely eccentric teacher Captain Klänning (Dress). Aside from being incompetent, Klänning also has a speech disorder which makes him incapable of properly pronouncing the word space (Rymd in Swedish).
- Percy's sidekick Tommy Bohlin falls in love with a hotel receptionist and tries to win her heart. His attempts end in disaster.
- A man develops an obsession with his new fireplace, eventually chopping up his house to feed the flames.
