= Bert: The Last Virgin =

Bert - Den siste oskulden
- Directed by: Tomas Alfredson
- Written by: Michael Hjorth; Anders Jacobsson
- Based on: Bert Diaries
- Produced by: Johan Mardell; Stefan Lundberg
- Starring: Martin Andersson; Cajsalisa Ejemyr; Oliver Loftéen; Davide Boati; Ing-Marie Carlsson; Johan Ulveson and others
- Music by: Michael B. Tretow
- Production companies: SF; SVT
- Distributed by: SF
- Release date: December 25, 1995 (Sweden)
- Running time: circa 95 minutes
- Country: Sweden
- Language: Swedish
- Box office: $2.6 million (Sweden)

Bert: The Last Virgin (Swedish: Bert – den siste oskulden) is a Swedish film which was released to cinemas in Sweden on 25 December 1995, based on the Bert Diaries by Anders Jacobsson and Sören Olsson. It introduces new characters to the Bert Universe and uses actors like Martin Andersson and Cajsalisa Ejemyr.

== Plot ==
In contemporary Öreskoga, Sweden lives 15 years old Bert Ljung. He attends the 9th grade at school in Sweden and only "thinks of girls", and thinks most of his friends have "done it".

== Production ==
The film was recorded between 27 March - 2 June 1995 in Solna, Vällingby and Kärrtorp Secondary School in Kärrtorp.

== Reception ==
The film was rated 7 in Sweden

It was the second highest-grossing Swedish film for 1996, behind The Hunters, with a gross of $2,603,905.

== Home video ==
The film was released to VHS in 1996 and DVD in 2008.
