= Percy Nilegård =

Fictional Swedish comedic character

Percy Nilegård is a fictional character played by Johan Rheborg since 1991, and one of the primary staples of the Swedish comedy group Killinggänget.

As a vain, snobbish and possibly insane businessman with a noticeable underbite, he does almost everything to earn money while also promoting his own ideas of "good taste". Nilegård, whose worldview is very ignorant in general, has a tendency to insert (sometimes poorly worded) English words and phrases into his speech, primarily to describe management and corporate-related concepts, a tendency which makes his character somewhat reminiscent of the Swedish yuppie culture in the late 1980s.

== I manegen med Glenn Killing (In the ring with Glenn Killing) 1992 ==
Percy is the producer of a talent-spot show hosted by Glenn Killing on which he makes frequent appearances. There he promotes his own brand of toothpaste called "Niledent" and hosts a short segment called "the guide to the bettre [sic] Sweden" in which he guides the viewer to his vision of Sweden, including what is "good" art and the significance of subway color-codes on social classes.

== Nilecity 105,6, 1994 ==
Percy owns a small radio-station located above a fire-department with Glenn as the primary radio-host. In his quest to get rich he tries numerous schemes including airing advertisements for companies and asking them for payments afterwards, a concept which he calls "marketing by not asking any questions first" and which meets with little success. He also runs a mock charity-drive for poor children in Rinkeby.

The male head of the fire-department also develops a crush on him, courting him in various manners. Percy is not happy when he finally reveals his feelings.

== Percy tårar (Tears of Percy) 1996 ==
Having left Glenn behind, Percy goes into psychotherapy where he meets Dr J Tull (played by the same actor as Glenn) who listens to the tale of how he – along with his new side-kick Tommy Bohlin – exploited the new boss of an old family-run brewery.

== Torsk på Tallinn (Screwed in Tallinn) 1999 ==
Percy runs a travel-agency for lonely men who travel abroad to meet potential wives. He takes them to a shoddy hotel in Tallinn, Estonia, where things get complicated.

== Glenn Killing på Grand, 2000 ==
Now in a bad financial situation, Percy and his new business partner make an appearance on stage for a small musical performance. In return, Glenn offers them a hot meal.

== Trivia ==
Percy usually drives or travels in American cars, including a 4-door Cadillac, a Buick Electra station-wagon, a Chevrolet Van and – in one case – a Lincoln Limo.
