= The Drowning (novel) =

2008 novel by Camilla Läckberg

- Series: Pegasus Crime
- Subject: Popular Fiction-Contemporary Thrillers
- Genre: Crime
- Publisher: HarperCollins
- Publication date: 2008
- Pages: 480 pages
- ISBN: 0-00-741951-1
- Preceded by: The Hidden Child
- Followed by: The_Lost_Boy_(novel)

The Drowning is a 2008 novel by Camilla Läckberg. Its Swedish title is "Sjöjungfrun," literally translated in English as "The Mermaid". It is her sixth book in her mystery series set in Fjällbacka, Sweden, featuring Detective Patrik Hedström.

== Reception ==
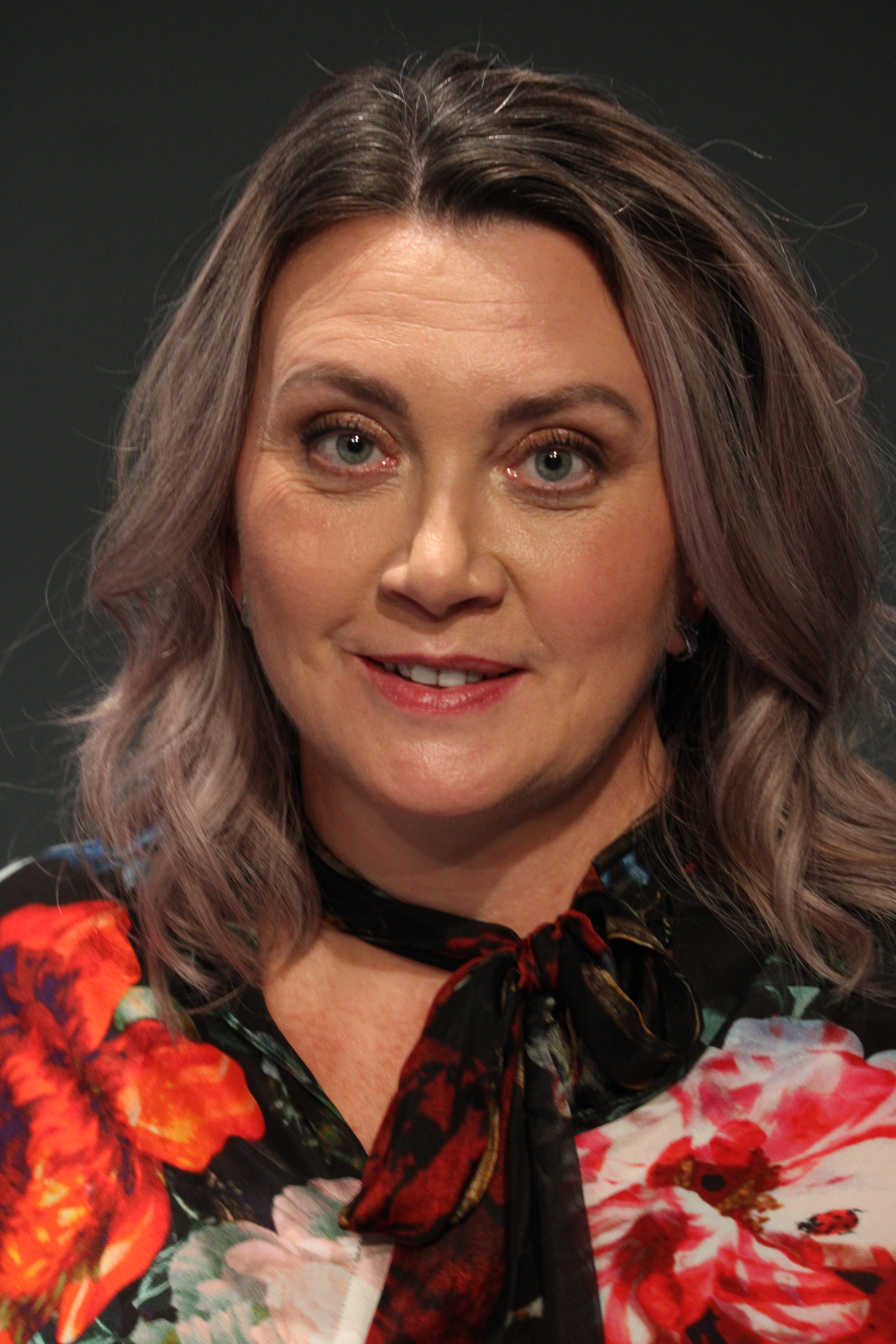
Camilla Läckberg

Prior to its American debut in 2015, Publishers Weekly predicted that The Drowning would be Läckberg's "breakout book in the U.S."

Kirkus Reviews described the book as "filled with Hitchcock-ian twists", and said that the author "excels at ratcheting up the tension by weaving this complex, fascinating, very dark mystery through the everyday lives of the unsuspecting residents of Fjällbacka, any of whom might be involved."

Meanwhile, Library Journal suggested that "the excessive details hinder the buildup of page-turning suspense".

== Plot ==
The plot involves a novelist, Christian Thydell, who receives anonymous threats, but whose own behavior is suspicious.

Like Margaret Atwood's The Blind Assassin, The Drowning contains a novel within a novel: 'The Mermaid' is that story.
