= Claudia Galli =

Swedish actress (born 1978)

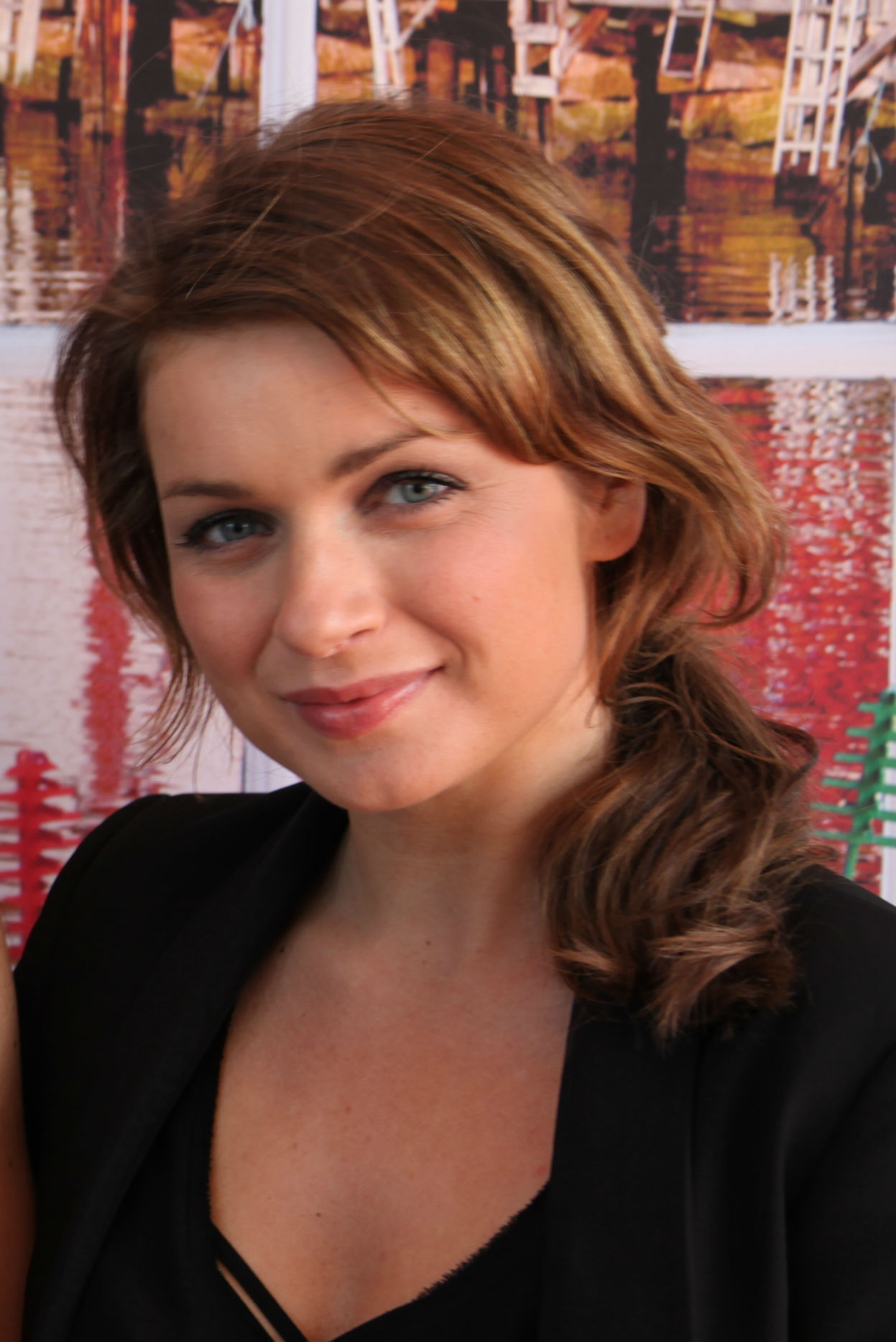
- Claudia Galli in Cannes (2012)
- Born: Claudia Josefina Galli Concha; 3 August 1978 (age 47); Stockholm, Sweden
- Occupation: actress
- Spouse(s): Manuel Concha (2012); Johan Svangren (2002–2004)
- Children: 2

Claudia Josefina Galli Concha (born 3 August 1978) is a Swedish actress. Claudia was born in Stockholm.

== Career ==
She started her career at age three in the segment "Film-tajm" in the television show Trazan & Banarne. Galli got her breakthrough as an actress in the TV4 soap opera Skilda världar where she played the character "Frida Lindberg.

She also played "Lina Svensson" for two seasons of the SVT comedy series Svensson, Svensson she also has been a panel member of the comedy show Parlamentet. Claudia Galli came in second place during Let's Dance 2010 being one of the celebrity dancers being partnered with Tobias Wallin.

After her dance appearances Galli played "Jonna Wetterström" in the SVT comedy series Starke man. From 2012 and forward Galli appeared in the six episode adaptation of author Camilla Läckberg's "Fjällbackamorden" films.

== Personal life ==
Claudia Galli has been married to director Manuel Concha since 2012. She is also the aunt of actress Josephine Bornebusch.

== Filmography ==
- 1995 – Svarta skallar och vita nätter
- 1997–2002 – Skilda världar
- 1998 – Sista kontraktet
- 2001 – Festival
- 2001 – Känd från TV
- 2006 – Kärringen därnere
- 2006 – Asterix and the Vikings (voice of Abba)
- 2007 – Tusenbröder
- 2007 – Playa del Sol
- 2007 – Lögnens pris
- 2007 – Bee Movie (voice of Vanessa Bloome)
- 2007–2008 – Svensson Svensson
- 2008 – Misses lista
- 2008 – Oskyldigt dömd
- 2009 – Parlamentet
- 2009 – Het Huis Anubis (voice of Patricia)
- 2009 – Cirkus Möller
- 2009 – Emmas film
- 2010 – Starke man
- 2011 – Rango (voice)
- 2011 – Spy Kids 4D (voice of Marissa Wilson)
- 2012 – Fjällbackamorden
- 2013 – Bäst före
