= Kockduellen =

- Genre: food-cooking contest
- Presented by: Staffan Ling (1996–2000); Peder Lamm (2008)
- Country of origin: Sweden
- Original language: Swedish

Original release
- Network: TV 4
- Release: 26 August 1996 – 16 May 2008

Kockduellen was a Swedish food cooking-contest airing over TV 4. It originally aired between 26 August 1996 – 2000 with Staffan Ling as host, and subsequently with Peder Lamm from 2000-2008.

Among the chefs in the programme were Leif Mannerström, Gert Klötzke, Fredrik Eriksson, Mathias Dahlgren and Christian Hellberg.

== Format ==
Two teams competed against each other in cooking. Every team had one celebrity guest and one professional chef. The guests were given a limit sum of money to use for shopping for the necessary ingredients. Within 20 minutes (from 2008: 15 minutes) they were then required to prepare their foods.

Finally, it was up to the audience to vote for the winning team.
