= Stonecutter (disambiguation) =

A stonecutter is a person who carries on the trade of stonecutting or stonemasonry.

Stonecutter or Stonecutters may also refer to:

- Chainsaw (section Cutting stone, concrete and brick)

== Books ==
- Stonecutter, one of twelve magical Swords in the Books of the Swords series
- The Stonecutter, a Japanese folktale about a man who wished he was the sun
- The Stonecutter (novel), a novel by Camilla Läckberg
- Stonecutter (comics), a Marvel Comics supervillain

== Film and television ==
- The Stonecutters, a fictional secret society from The Simpsons episode "Homer the Great"
- Stenhuggaren, also known as The Stonecutter, 2009 film by Emiliano Goessens, adapted from The Stone Cutter by Camilla Läckberg

== Geography ==
- Stonecutters Bridge, Hong Kong
- Stonecutters Island, in Victoria Harbour, Hong Kong

== Music ==
- "Stonecutter", a song by James Keelaghan from Home (2001)
- "Stonecutter", a song by Preston Reed from Metal (1995)
- "Stonecutters", an instrumental by Flying Lotus from The Music of Grand Theft Auto V (2013)
- "We Do", also known as "We Do (The Stonecutters' Song)", a song from The Simpsons episode "Homer the Great"
