= The Angel Maker's Wife =

2011 novel by Camilla Läckberg

- First edition
- Author: Camilla Läckberg
- Original title: Änglamakerskan
- Language: Swedish
- Subject: Popular Fiction-Contemporary Thrillers
- Genre: Crime
- Publisher: Bokförlaget Forum
- Publication date: 2011
- Media type: mp3-book, e-book, large paperback, audiobook (CD) and audio book (MP3 CD).
- Pages: 400
- ISBN: 978-91-37-13665-3
- Preceded by: Feast, Food & Love

The Angel Maker's Wife is Camilla Läckberg's eighth book in her Fjällbacka series, and was published in Sweden on 19 December 2011.

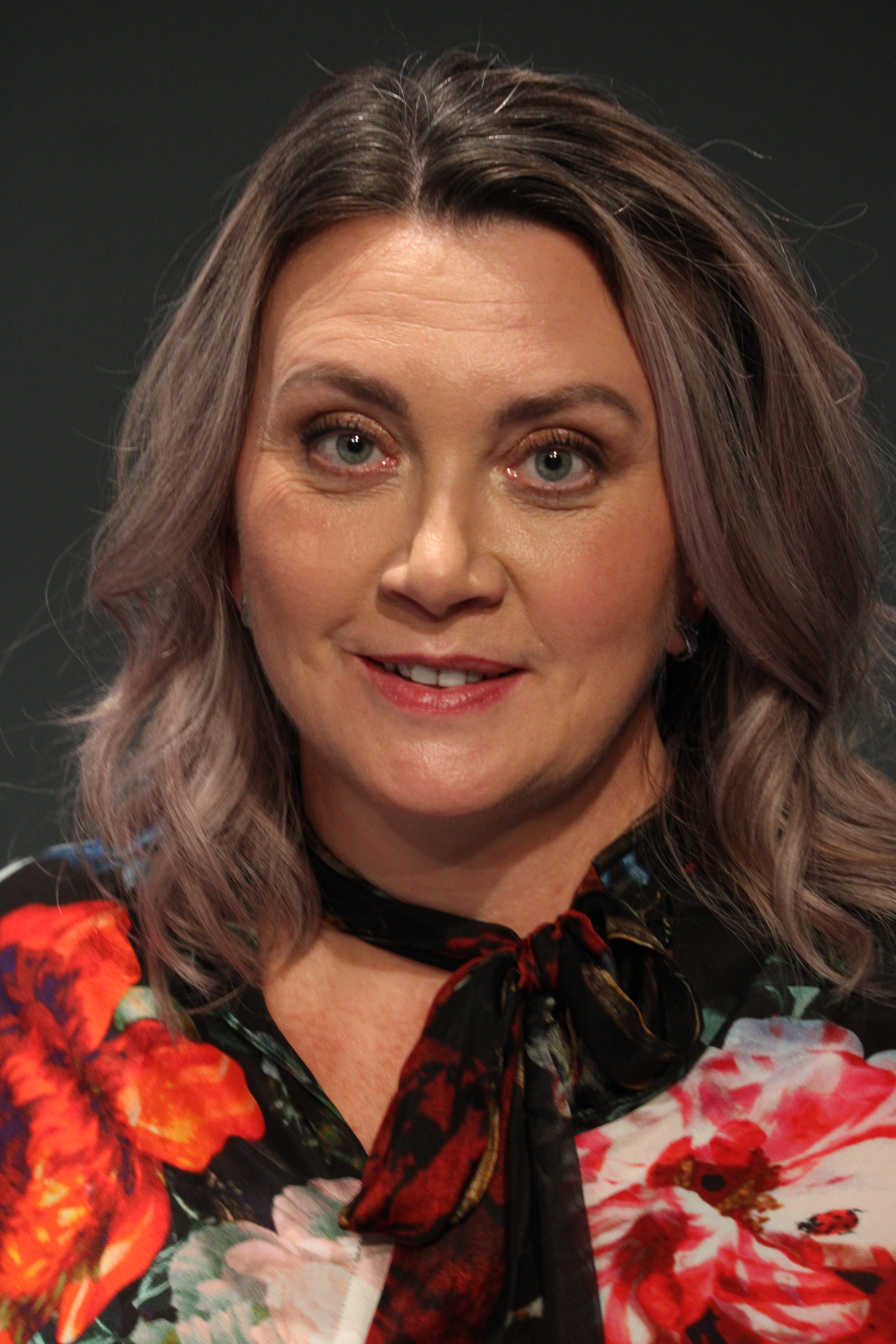
Camilla Läckberg

== Plot ==
In April 1974 there is a disappearance of a family without a trace from the island Valö just outside Fjällbacka: an Easter buffet is in the dining room and a baby (Ebba) is found wandering the house alone.;. Two parallel stories, one past/one present, where the past explains the present. Ebba and her husband Mårten have lost a son, and in an attempt to overcome the sadness they decide to open a bed and breakfast.

Preceded by Feast, Food & Love	Camilla Läckberg; 2003	Succeeded by
