= Fjällbackamorden =

Swedish series of television films

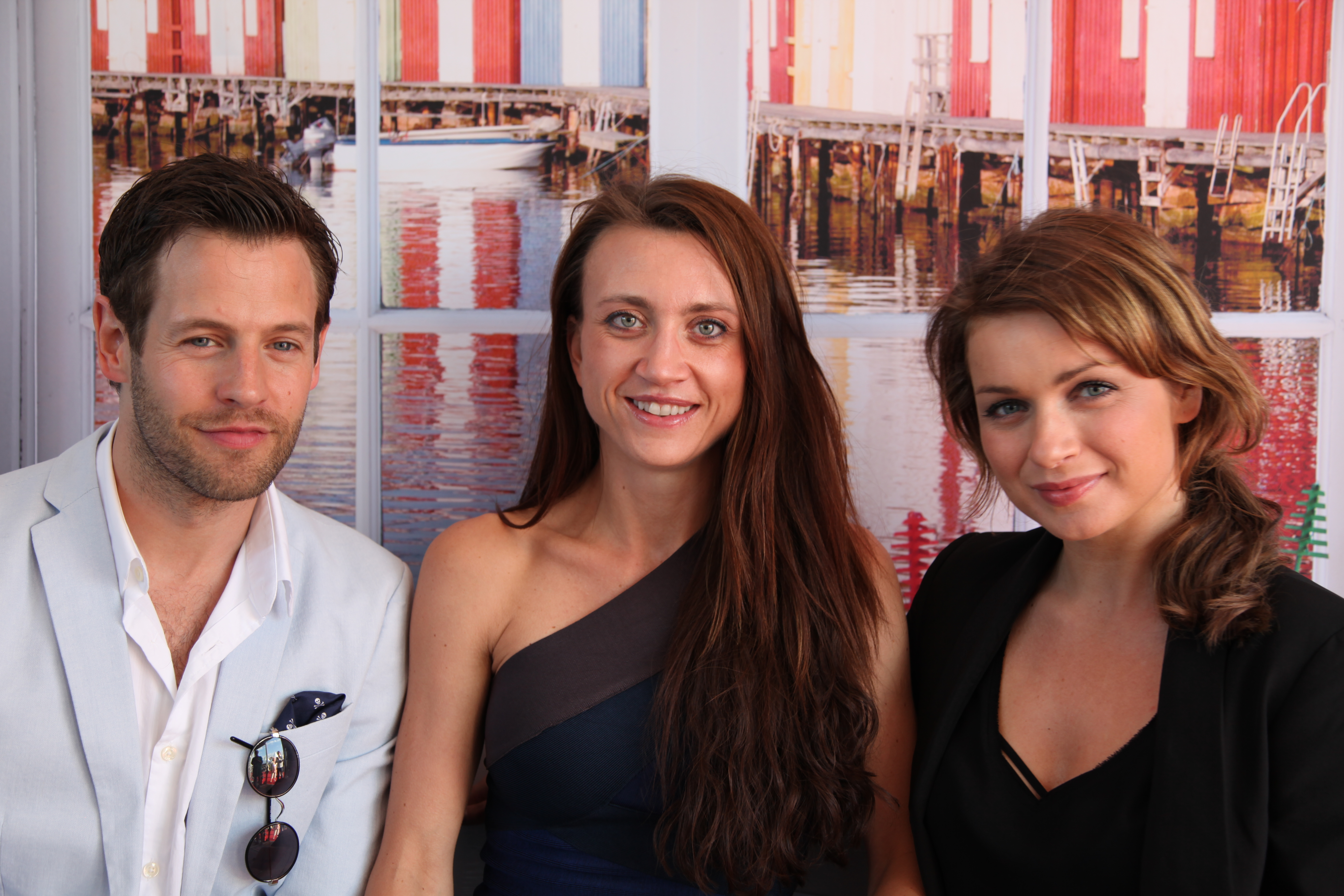
Richard Ulfsäter, Camilla Läckberg and Claudia Galli at Cannes Film Festival 2012.

Fjällbackamorden ("The Fjällbacka Murders") is a Swedish series of six 1.5-hour-long TV television films, based on characters from the "Fjällbackamorden" series of crime novels written by author Camilla Läckberg. Tre Vänner Produktion was the lead producer and the author was part of the project when presented at the Cannes Film Festival.

== Story ==
The main character is Erica played by Claudia Galli in the films. In the first novel, The Ice Princess, Erica is unmarried and returns to Fjällbacka to clean out their home, and ends up staying. In the TV series, she is already a famous author, married to Patrik, has three children, and lives in Fjällbacka. A common theme in all the shows is how contemporary murders drive Erica to dig up long-buried secrets in the "idyllic" seaside town. The stories are all new and not directly based on any of the books. Richard Ulfsäter plays Erica's husband, police inspector Patrik Hedstrom.

== Production ==
The films had various directors. The filming stopped for some time when the director Daniel Lind Lagerlöf disappeared on 6 October 2011 while scouting locations for "The Coast Rider". Rickard Petrelius took over the director's position.

== Installments ==
The series consists of one theatrical film (The Hidden Child) along with five 90-minute TV-movies broadcast on SVT.

The installments are:

- The Eye of the Beholder (2012 – Swedish: I betraktarens öga) – When an "Antiques Roadshow" comes to town, people are murdered for what seems an ordinary painting. Directed by Jörgen Bergmark.
- Friends for Life (2013 – Swedish: Vänner för livet) – A school reunion and complicated business dealings spark murders that may cover up crimes from school days. Directed by Richard Holm.
- The Hidden Child (2013 – Swedish: Tyskungen) – When Erica's parents are killed in a car crash, she cleans out their family home and finds old secrets – and new murders – harking back to the Nazi occupation of Norway. This is the first story chronologically. Directed by Per Hanefjord.
- The Sea Gives, the Sea Takes (2013 – Swedish: Havet ger, havet tar) – When a famous and "beloved" photographer is murdered, Erica discovers many people in town were being blackmailed for compromising photos going back years. Directed by Marcus Olsson.
- The Coast Rider (2013 – Swedish: Strandridaren) – When two tourist divers drown, Erica discovers they may have stumbled on a long-lost treasure at the bottom of the bay. Directed by Rickard Petrelius.
- The Queen of Light (2013 – Swedish: Ljusets drottning) – When this Christmas' Santa Lucia girl goes missing, Erica learns of another's death decades ago and the "curse". Directed by Rickard Petrelius.
