= The Ice Princess (novel) =

2003 novel by Camilla Läckberg

- Author: Camilla Läckberg
- Original title: Isprinsessan
- Translator: Steven T. Murray
- Language: Swedish, English
- Subject: Popular fiction Contemporary thriller
- Genre: Crime thriller
- Publisher: Warne (Sweden); HarperCollins (UK)
- Publication date: 2003
- Publication place: Sweden; United Kingdom; United States
- English publication date: 2008 (UK)
- Pages: 420 pages
- ISBN: 0-00-726985-4
- Followed by: The Preacher

The Ice Princess is a crime novel by Swedish author Camilla Läckberg. As her debut novel, it was originally published in 2003 in Swedish, entitled Isprinsessan. The novel follows a husband-and-wife duo, detective Patrik Hedström and writer Erica Falck, investigating a suspicious suicide, and is the first in a series of books featuring these characters. It was adapted into a telemovie of the same name in 2007.

== Plot ==
Writer Erica Falck has returned to her family home in Fjällbacka after her parents died. While coping with their death, she is trying to work on a biography of Selma Lagerlöf, a Swedish author and the first female writer to win the Nobel Prize in Literature.

Patrik Hedström, a detective, is assigned to investigate a case in which the victim, Erica's childhood friend Alex, is found frozen in a bathtub, her wrists cut in an apparent suicide. The investigation shows that the young woman's death occurred before she was placed in the tub, allowing the liquid to freeze around her as the temperature dropped far below freezing inside her house. Exactly when the furnace went out-of-order is a timely coincidence to the alleged suicide.

At the prompting of Alex's parents, Erica begins to investigate the death of their daughter. Her breakthrough comes when she meets a police officer who is also investigating the mystery; together the two uncover dark secrets within the town. Erica and Patrick's fascination gives way to deep obsession as they struggle to determine the true circumstances surrounding the death. Erica visualizes a memoir about Alex, one that will answer questions about their missing friendship.

== Publication ==
Isprinsessan is the debut novel of Swedish author Camilla Läckberg, published by Warne in Sweden in 2003. It is the first in a series of books featuring these characters, the latest (as of April 2025) being the 11th in the series, Gökungen, translated into English as The Cuckoo by Ian Giles in 2024.

The book was translated as The Ice Princess by American translator Steven T. Murray and published in the UK by HarperCollins in 2008. It was published in the US in June 2010 by Free Press and Pegasus, and has been reprinted several times since.

== Critical reception ==
The Publishers Weekly review reflected that, in her first novel, "Läckberg skillfully details how horrific secrets are never completely buried and how silence can kill the soul." Kirkus Reviews noted that the novel turns up "the sordidness of the wealthy, the appalling effects of child abuse and the general mayhem that ensues whenever cabin fever sets in".

The Ice Princess was listed in Time magazine's "The 100 Best Mystery and Thriller Books" list in 2023.

== Themes ==
The difficulty of parent-child relationships is a recurring theme in The Ice Princess. True to the genre of Scandinavian crime fiction (often called Nordic noir), a heavy emphasis is given to characterization and (especially in Lackberg's instance) the development of the small town where the crime occurs. The importance of the location is emphasized by the inclusion of a map of Fjällbacka, and the depictions of the landscape are both colorful and integral to the plot. In multiple instances throughout the book, Läckberg explores interesting details dealing with food, and body and self esteem issues.

== Adaptations ==
A graphic novel version of the novel was published in French by Belgian publisher Casterman in 2014, as La princesse des glaces.

Isprinsessan was adapted as a telemovie in 2007.

== Characters ==
- Erika Falck: Writer and journalist who gets involved as an amateur sleuth.
- Patrik Hedström: Detective Inspector in Tanumshede, romantic interest of Erika.
- Bertil Mellberg: Detective Chief Inspector, often seen as lazy and not very competent.
- Gösta Flygare: Detective Inspector.
- Anna Maxwell (née Falck): Erika's sister.
- Lucas Maxwell: Anna's abusive husband.
- Pernilla Karlsson: Wife of Erika’s high school sweetheart
- Dan Karlsson: Pernilla's husband. Former boyfriend of Erika
- Eilert Berg: Old working man who finds Alexandra's corpse.
- Alexandra Wijkner (née Carlgen): Victim whose corpse is found in a frozen bath.
- Henrik Wijkner: Alexandra's husband.
- Karl Erik Carlgen: Alexandra's father, who lives in Särö.
- Birgit Carlgen (née Persson): Alexandra's mother.
- Julia Carlgen: Alexandra's thirteen year younger sister.
- Nelly Lorentz: Widow of a rich businessman.
- Nils Lorentz: Nelly's son, who disappeared many years ago.
- Jan Lorentz: Nelly's adopted son, who took over the tin can food company.
- Anders Nilsson: Alcoholic painter.
- Vera Nilsson: Anders' mother.
- Francine Sandberg (née Bijoux): Friend of Alexandra who started an art gallery with her.
- Bengt Larsson: Former convict, friend of Anders.
