= The Stonecutter (novel) =

2005 novel by Camilla Läckberg

- Hard Cover
- Series: Pegasus Crime
- Subject: Murder
- Genre: Crime fiction
- Publisher: HarperCollins
- Publication date: 2005
- English publication date: 2010
- Pages: 480 pages
- Preceded by: The Preacher
- Followed by: The Gallows Bird

The Stonecutter (Swedish: Stenhuggaren) is a 2005 Swedish psychological thriller novel in the crime fiction genre by Camilla Läckberg. It was translated by Steven T. Murray and published by HarperCollins in 2010.

== Plot ==
Near Fjällbacka the corpse of seven-year-old Sara is found in a fisherman's net. The post-mortem shows that this was not a case of accidental drowning, because she only has fresh water in her lungs. She was the daughter of Erica's friend Charlotte, whom she bonded with as they both recently had children. The parents of the dead child live with the maternal grandmother, Lilian, an acerbic hag engaged in a never-ending battle with her 'Neighbour from Hell' Kaj, who has built a new domicile next door to her profound chagrin; Kaj has a reclusive autistic son, Morgan, who spends many hours isolated in his room working on his computer; suspicions begins to point to him as the possible murderer, particularly as he had seen and spoken to the child on the day they died. Patrik would prefer to work on the case with his colleague Martin, but instead the less competent Ernst Lundgren is assigned as his partner. While they're interrogating suspects and witnesses another baby is found with ashes in its mouth, but still alive.

On the personal front Erika and Patrik are raising their baby Maja, with interference from Patrik's mother Kristina. Chief Inspector Mellberg, divorced, tries to bond with his difficult teenage son Simon, who is staying with him for a while.

A secondary storyline starts in Strömstad in 1923. The poor stonecutter Anders gets involved with Agnes, his boss's spoiled daughter. When she gets pregnant her father forces them to marry and expels them to a small house in Fjällbacka. They get twins, but Anders and his two sons are killed when Agnes sets the house on fire. She emigrates to the United States. In the 1950s she returns to Sweden with Mary, a girl she picked up from the streets, who becomes her adopted daughter. Agnes locks her daughter up in the cellar and lets her eat ashes or "Humility". She blames her second husband Åke, but she also starts an affair with a married man. The connection with the recent crime is only revealed towards the end.

The novel also portrays some manifestations of Asperger's syndrome, which is associated with the character of Morgan Wiberg.

== Characters ==
=== Investigators and relations ===
- Erika Falck: Writer, journalist and amateur sleuth in Fjällbacka.
- Patrik Hedström: Erika’s fiancé, Detective Inspector in Tanumshede.
- Bertil Mellberg: Detective Chief Inspector, often seen as lazy and not very competent.
- Martin Molin: Detective Inspector, Patrik’s preferred partner.
- Ernst Lundgren: Detective Inspector, Patrik’s temporary partner.
- Gösta Flygare: Detective Inspector.
- Annika: Police receptionist.
- Tord Pederson: forensic pathologist.
- Maja: Baby daughter of Patrick and Erika
- Anna Maxwell (née Falck): Erika's sister.
- Lucas Maxwell: Anna's abusive husband.
- Dan Karlsson: Friend of Erika and Patrik.
- Simon Mellberg: Bertil’s son.

=== Victim and relations ===
- Sara Antonsson: Drowning victim, young girl with deficits in attention, motor control and perception (DAMP).
- Albin Antonsson: Sara’s little brother.
- Charlotte Klinga: Sara’s mother, friend of Erika
- Niclas Antonsson: Charlotte’s husband, Sara’s father, general practitioner.
- Lilian Florin: Charlotte’s mother.
- Stig Florin: Charlotte’s bedridden stepfather, Lilian’s second husband.
- Lennart Klinga: Charlotte’s deceased father, Lilian’s first husband.
- Arne Antonsson: Niclas’ estranged father, sexton.
- Fran Bengtsson: lobster fisher, finds Sara’s corpse.
- Frida: Playmate of Sara.
- Veronika: Frida’s mother.
- Kaj Wiberg: Charlotte’s neighbour.
- Monika: Kaj’s wife.
- Morgan Wiberg: Kaj’s son, video game designer with Asperger syndrome.
- Aina: Niclas’ assistant.
- Jeanette Lind: Niclas’ lover.
- Sebastian Rydén: Troubled child.
- Rune Rydén: Sebastian's father.

=== People in the past ===
- Anders Andersson: Stonecutter in Strömstad in 1923.
- Agnes Stjernkvist: Spoiled girl with a crush on Anders.
- August Stjernkvist (né Persson): Agnes’ father, Anders’ boss.
- Mary: Agnes’ adopted daughter.
- Åke: Agnes’ second husband.
- Per-Erik: Agnes’ lover.
- Elisabeth: Per-Erik’s wife.

== Publication ==
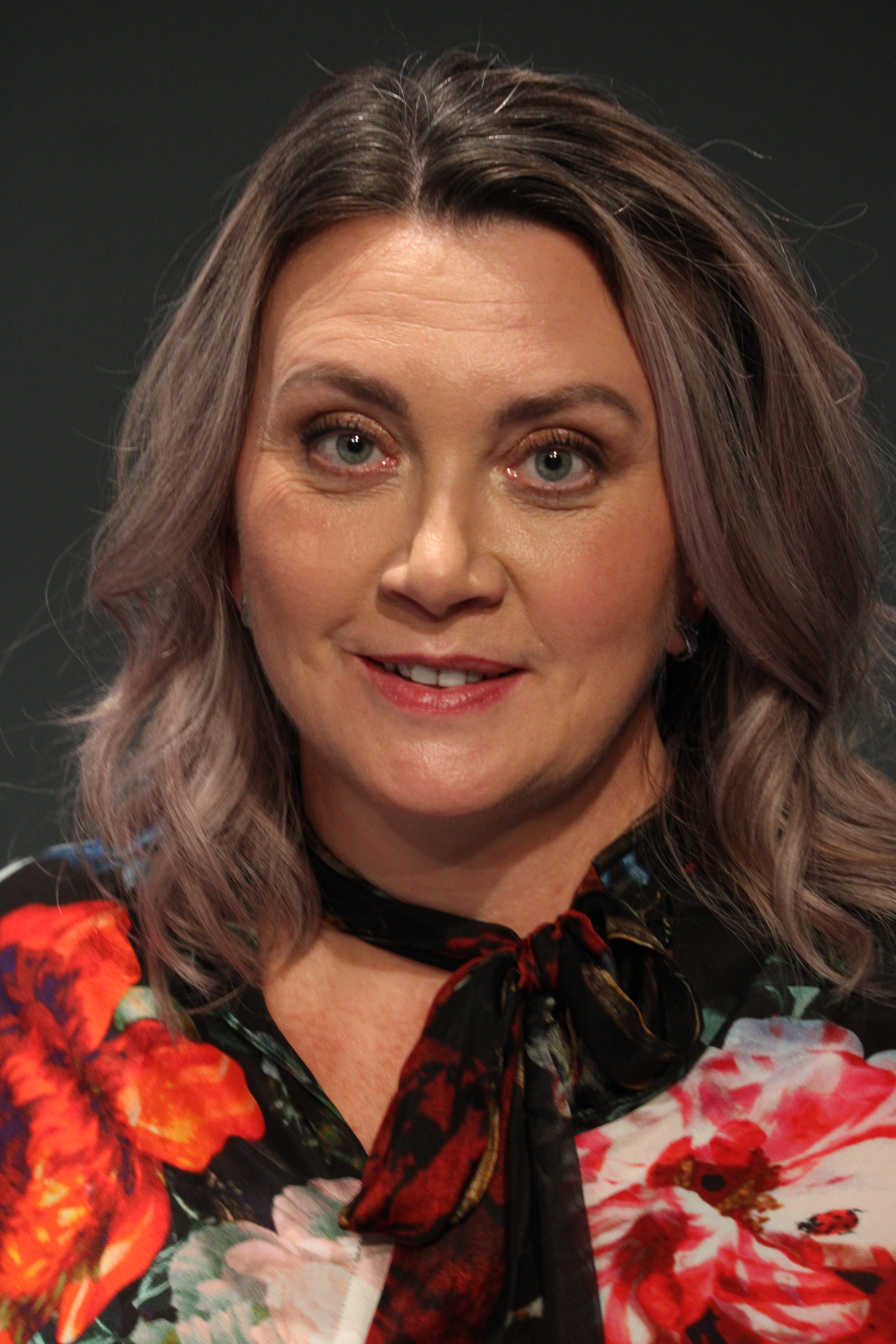
Camilla Läckberg

Stenhuggaren, a crime novel by Camilla Läckberg, was published in Sweden in 2005. An English version translated by American translator Steven T. Murray was published by HarperCollins in 2010 (also reprinted in the UK on 3 March 2011) and by Pegasus for sale in the United States on 1 May 2012.

== Themes and commentary ==
Child abuse in different forms and gradations is a central theme. The roots of the problem lie in an earlier generation and can be attributed, at least in part, to the upbringing of offspring. In the present, Erica and Patrik try to find a suitable parenting means. Even the incompetent police chief becomes belatedly involved in raising an infant.
