= Richard Ulfsäter =

Swedish actor

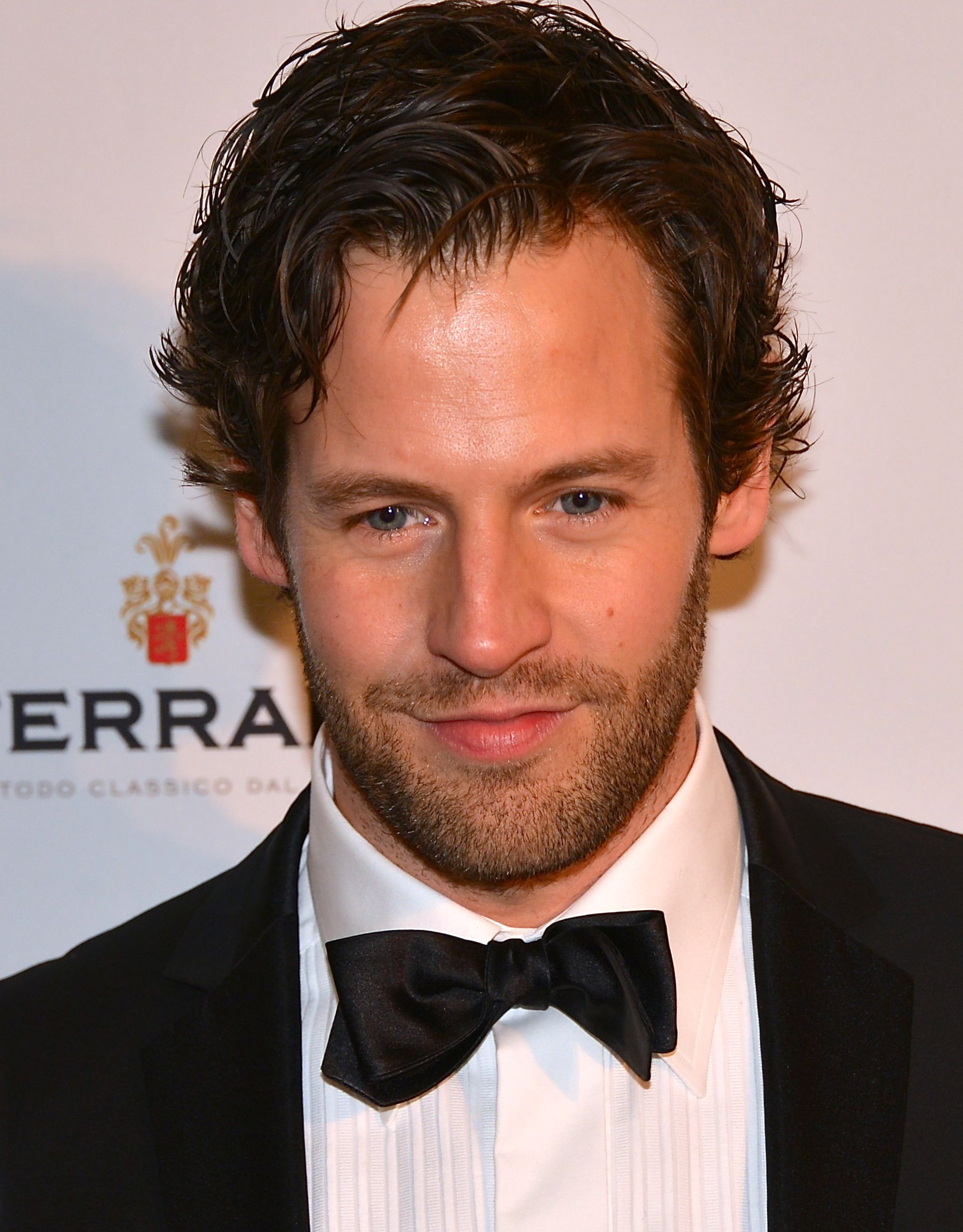
- Richard Ulfsäter (2013)
- Born: 1 September 1975 (age 50); Helsingborg, Sweden
- Occupation: actor

Richard Claes Erik Ulfsäter (born 1 September 1975) is a Swedish actor perhaps mostly known for his role as "Steffen" in the SVT comedy series Playa del Sol.

The Author Agneta Ulfsäter-Troell is his aunt. And his father is a cousin of Björn Ulvaeus. In 2009, Swedish magazine Dorian named Ulfsäter as Sweden's sexiest man. In an interview with the magazine, Ulfsäter confirmed that he had been arrested for possessing a small quantity of cocaine in his home. In May 2009, he was sentenced to probation after confessing to the prosecutor in charge of the case. He then voluntarily entered into treatment for addiction. Discussing his recovery in his interview with Dorian, he stated, "Today I stick with wine."

Ulfsäter appeared in all 12 episodes of Camilla Läckberg's Fjällbackamorden as the policeman Patrik. He also appeared in the 2016 French-Swedish series Midnattssol (English title: "Midnight Sun") as helicopter pilot Thor.

== Filmography ==
- 2000 – Vita lögner
- 2002 – Spung
- 2007 – Playa del Sol
- 2007 – Darling
- 2008 – Vi hade i alla fall tur med vädret – igen
- 2008 – Patrik 1,5
- 2010 – Puss
- 2010 – Fyra år till
- 2012 – En fiende att dö för
- 2012 – Nobel's Last Will
- 2013 – Inkognito
- 2013 – Fjällbackamorden
- 2016 – Midnattssol
- 2025 – Tidstjuven
