= Henrik Hjelt =

Swedish actor and comedian

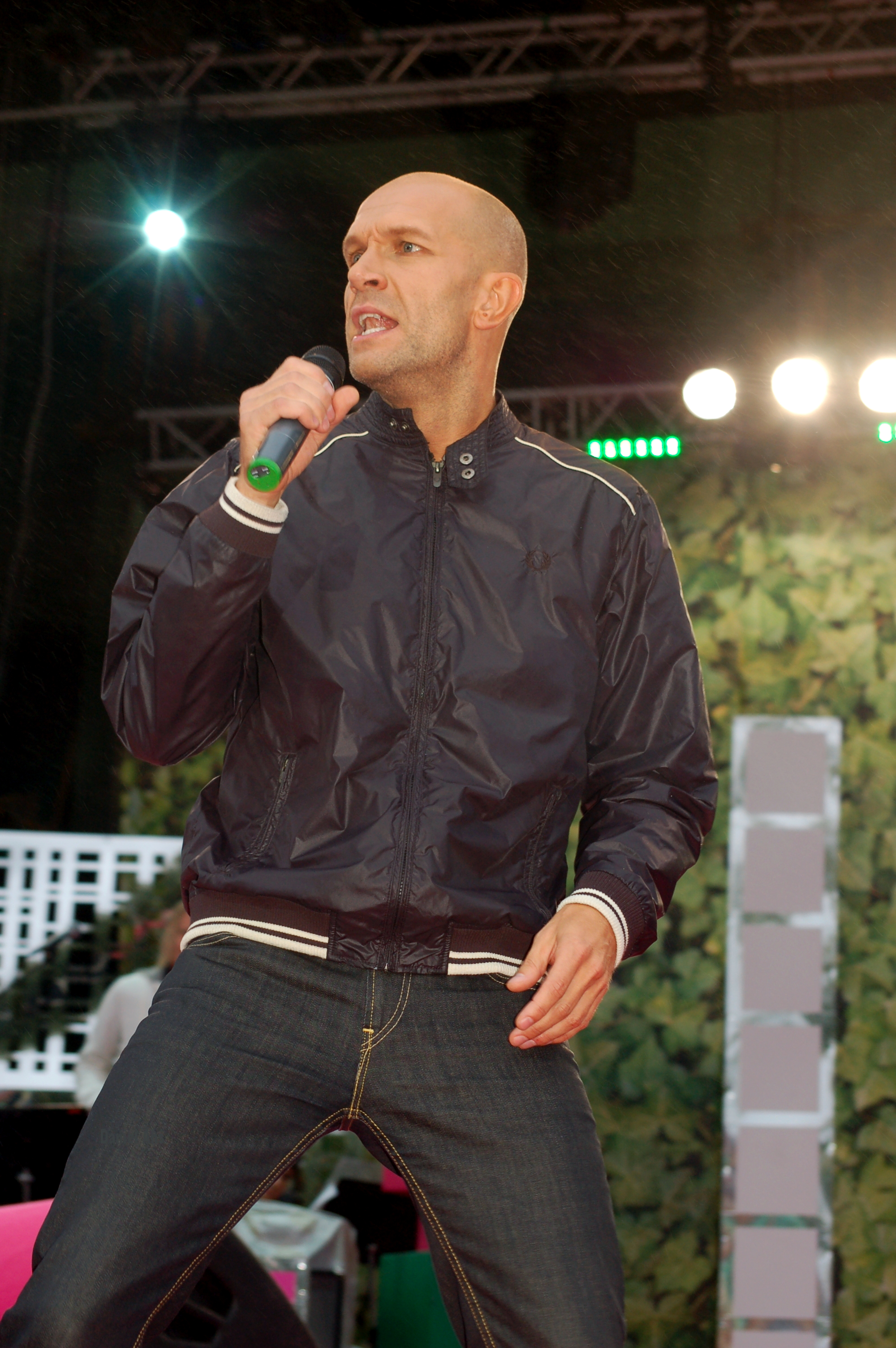
Henrik Hjelt

Henrik Olov August Hjelt (born 6 March 1968 on Lidingö), is a Swedish comedian and actor. He is also a reserve officer in the Swedish Amphibious Corps and a lawyer.

== Selected filmography ==
- 1999-:Parlamentet (The Parliament)
- 2001: Känd från TV (Known From TV)
- 2002: Klassfesten (The Class Reunion)
- 2002: Utanför din dörr (Right Outside Your Door)
- 2004: Treasure Planet (Swedish voice for B.E.N.)
- 2005: Robots (Swedish voice for Crank)
- 2007: Playa del Sol (TV-series)
