= The Preacher (novel) =

2004 Swedish crime novel by Camilla Läckberg

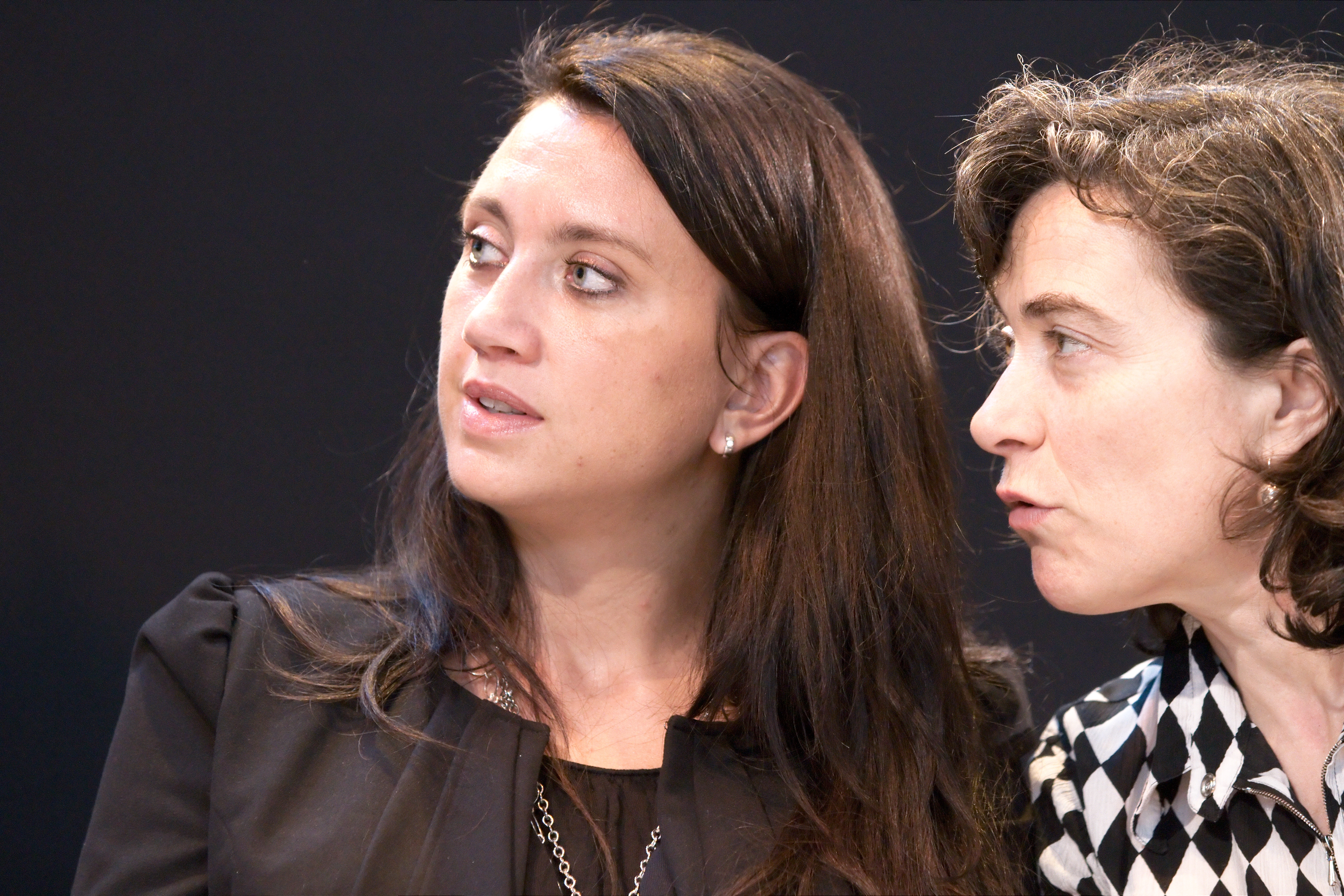
- Camilla Läckberg with her French translator
- Author: Camilla Läckberg
- Translator: Steven T. Murray (English)
- Series: Pegasus Crime
- Subject: Popular Fiction-Contemporary Thrillers
- Genre: Crime
- Publication date: 2004
- English publication date: 2011
- Pages: 432
- ISBN: 978-1-60598-173-4
- Preceded by: The Ice Princess
- Followed by: The Stone Cutter

The Preacher (Swedish: Predikanten) is a 2004 Swedish psychological thriller novel by Camilla Läckberg. It was translated into English by Steven T. Murray and published by Pegasus Crime in 2011.

== Plot ==
Like Läckberg's other novels, this one take place in the tiny fishing village of Fjällbacka on Sweden's west coast. Detective Patrik Hedström and his wife Erica Falck investigate after a young boy discovers a woman's dead body, and two skeletons are found below that body. It is discovered that the skeletons belong to young women who disappeared when camping in the area in 1979. A young girl goes missing. Falck's sister Anna and her marriage problems, are another story thread. Hedström's task is hampered by a heatwave, Falck being pregnant with their first child, and sycophantic relatives. There is also a self-serving police chief who likes getting the credit for all cases under his watch and a resentful veteran but inept officer. Hedström is smart and caring, but not always good and sometimes has trouble staying focused.

Almost every subplot focuses on a parent-child relationship. Falck, who was the central character of Läckberg's first novel, The Ice Princess, is restricted by her pregnancy and finds dealing with guests or unravelling crime daunting, so Hedström and his sidekick, Martin, do most of the investigating. As Patrick pursues ancient leads, his sixth sense tells him the Hult family have something to do with a series of. Their grandfather, known as The Preacher, moved into the community after one of his acolytes died, leaving both land and property for him to disperse. Dark secrets emerge about the Hults.

== Publication ==
Predikanten, a psychological thriller novel by Camilla Läckberg, was published in Sweden in 2003. It was translated into English by Steven T. Murray and published by Pegasus Crime on 27 April 2011.

== Reception ==
In a review of the novel by The Washington Post, the reviewer noted that the "clever plot and in-depth characterization aren’t the only qualities that elevate The Preacher above most other thrillers. There's also an admirable feel for detail."
