= The Gallows Bird =

2006 novel by Camilla Läckberg

- Author: Camilla Läckberg
- Translator: Steven T. Murray
- Language: English
- Subject: Popular Fiction-Contemporary Thrillers
- Genre: Crime
- Publisher: Harpercollins
- Publication date: 2006
- English publication date: March 2011
- Pages: 378 pages
- ISBN: 0-00-725400-8
- Preceded by: The Stone Cutter
- Followed by: Flavours from Fjällbacka

The Gallows Bird (Swedish: Olycksfågeln) is a 2006 novel by Camilla Läckberg, translated by Steven T. Murray in 2011. It is the fourth psychological thriller written by Läckberg.

== Synopsis ==
Patrik (police officer) and Erica (writer) have reconnected, had a child and are moving headlong into matrimony. Problems sidelined when a chaotic alcohol-fueled party ends with the death of an unpopular contestant on a reality TV show. A local woman is found dead, apparently the victim of a car crash: the first in a spate of seemingly inexplicable accidents in Tanumshede. The car reeks of alcohol and the initial assumption is that it is a drunk driver accident.

Soon it becomes clear there's a serial assassin in the vicinity. As TV cameras shadow the reality show stars' every move, relations with the locals are strained to the breaking point. A piece of evidence reveals that a pair of seemingly disparate homicides are linked, and a pattern emerges of similar homicides spread over many years—in different regions of Sweden; slowly Patrick realizes that these cases are more closely linked than he had thought. Patrick also has his own set of problems to contend with: a wedding to arrange, and Erica's sister Anna living with them—he's experiencing stress.
