= Manuel Concha =

Swedish film director (born 1980)

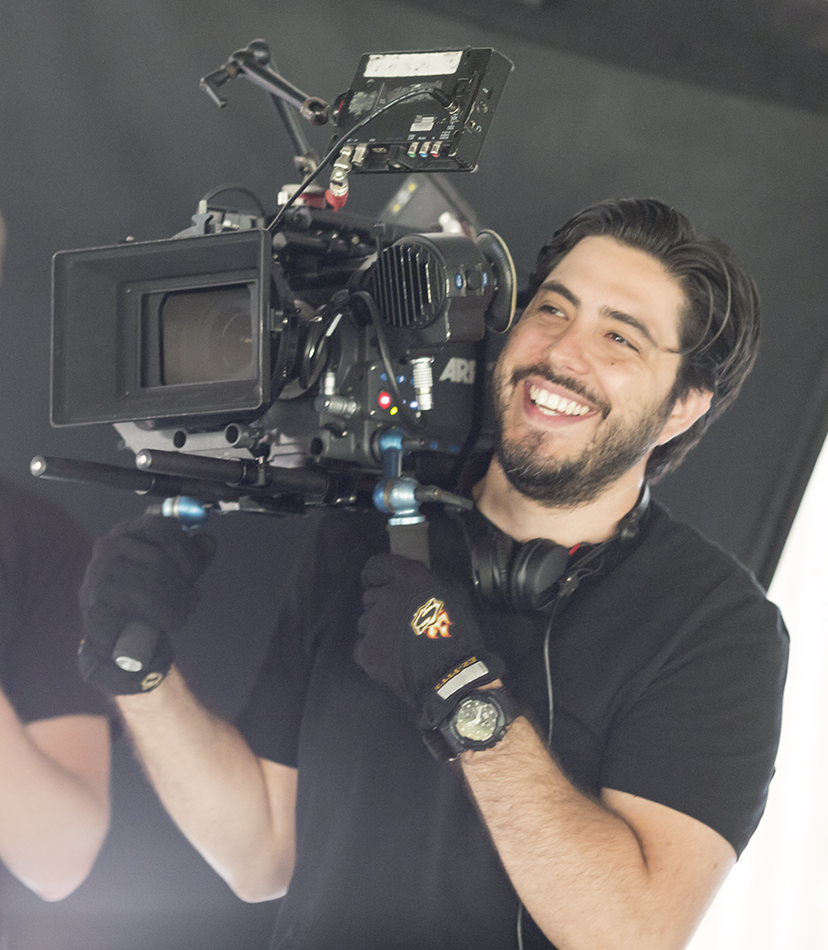
- Concha in 2016
- Born: October 24, 1980 (age 45); Malmö, Sweden
- Occupations: Film director, screenwriter
- Spouse: Claudia Galli

Manuel Concha (born 1980 in Malmö) is a Swedish film director of Chilean descent.

Manuel is a Swedish Academy Award-nominated writer-director Guldbaggen and has a Master in Film Directing at the prestigious Stockholm University of the Arts (Stockholms konstnärliga högskola).

== Career ==
In his youth, Concha started making short films for a total of over thirty short films, winning his first film festival at 16. Since then, Manuel has been working in film and television. He studied film in Los Angeles, where he also lives part-time.

Among his short films, Beslutet and Stunder were shown at Göteborgs filmfestival. Stunder won prize for ”Best Screenplay” at Pixel filmfestival. SVT (Swedish Television) bought and aired the film in 2006. Beslutet won around 13 short film festivals like November Filmfestivalen, and was nominated 1 km film at Stockholms Internationella Filmfestival.

In 2005, Concha started study at Filmhögskolan i Göteborg, but dropped out to debut as a feature film director with the movie Mañana with actresses like Alexandra Dahlström and Michael Segerström. Mañana, screened in Cleveland International Film Festival, Bogota International Film Festival, Newport Beach Film Festival, Bermuda International Filmfestival.

Concha directed the highly critical acclaimed TV-series Starke man, which was nominated for the Swedish Emmy Awards Kristallen 2011 and its second season 2012. Concha developed and directed TV-serie Elsas värld (Tre Vänner) based on Sofi Fahrman book ”Elsas mode”.

In 2014, Concha was awarded the ”Audience Award" at Göteborgs filmfestival for the short film Batter. The film Batter was later developed into a feature film and was released in cinemas in 2017, under the new name "Den enda vägen" (Blind Alley), which he both wrote and directed (wrote together with Claudia Galli Concha).

Four years later, Concha wrote, directed, photographed, and produced the successful film SUEDI that premiered on Viaplay. The film was a great success with over 1 million views. It became the most successful Swedish film 2021. Suedi won both ”Best Comedy” and ”Best Swedish Movie” at MovieZine Awards 2021. It also led to Conchas first Swedish Academy Awards nomination (Gulbaggen) for Best Screenplay.

Concha has directed ALEX (tv-series) and HEDER (tv-series), both on the top list as the most seen Swedish TV series on Viaplay. International media have bought both series and at least four remakes are being produced.

In February 2022, Manuel directed the criminal-drama series Bäckström season 2. for CMore.

Manuel has directed iconic and awarded music videos, with over 50 million views for artists like American Grammy nominated Trey Songz, Mr Eazi, The Sounds, Danny Saucedo, Medina, Sabina Ddumba och Cherrie. The music video "Fumble" (from the number one US album Chapter V) by Trey Songz officially premiered on BET’s 106 & Park as the new joint of the day in April 2013.[3]

Concha has also directed high-class commercials for companies like IKEA, Sony and BMW.

The City of Malmö and the State of Skåne awarded Concha with the Cultural Scholarship.

== Personal life ==
Manuel Concha's grandfather is the late Carlos Alberto Novoa Frias, minister of the Supreme Court of Chile.
