= Staffan Ling =

Swedish actor

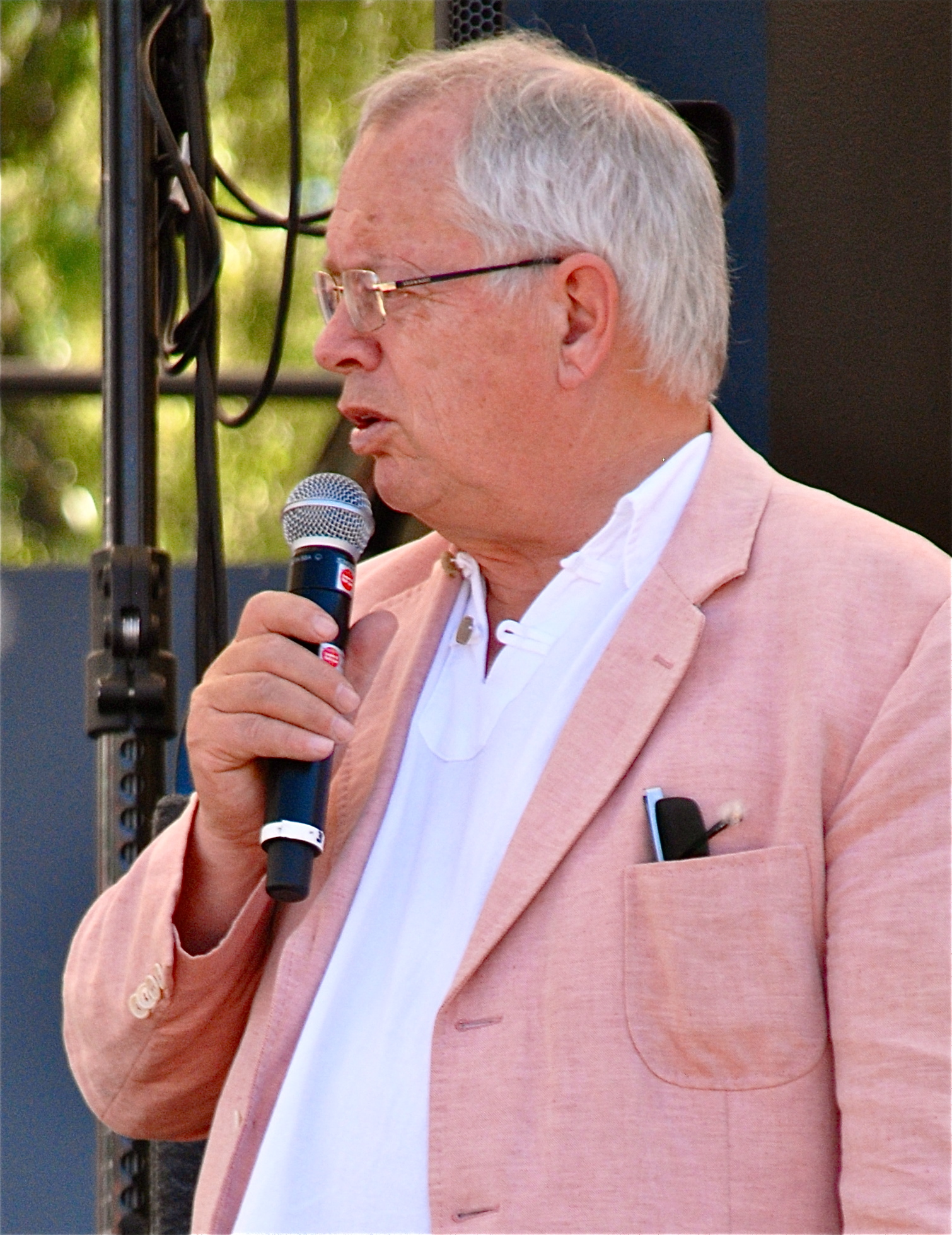
- Ling in 2011
- Born: 8 November 1944 (age 81); Östersund, Sweden
- Occupation: Television presenter
- Known for: Kockduellen, Stadskampen, Parlamentet

Staffan Ling (born 8 November 1944) is a Swedish actor and television presenter. Ling moved to Umeå to study humanities at the Umeå University during his early years, and became one of the founders of the local student theatre (Umeå Nya Studentteater) in 1964.

He was a producer at Sveriges Radio and SVT in Umeå between 1971 and 1987. Amongst the shows he has presented is the quiz show Femettan broadcast on SVT, the comedy show Parlamentet and the game show Stadskampen, both on TV4. Along with actor Bengt Andersson he participated in Sant och sånt from 1972 to 1987, a show for children featuring simple scientific and technical experiments and explanations of how things work. Through this show, the two became well established as the duo Staffan & Bengt.

Ling has participated in several of SVTs Julkalendern shows, Julkul med Staffan & Bengt, Julstrul med Staffan & Bengt and Liv i luckan med julkalendern. He is also known for hosting the cooking competition show Kockduellen.

Ling acted in the film Sällskapsresan 2, he has also presented the TV4 show Ring Ling, and as a "celebrity tracker" on the entertainment show På rymmen in 1998.
