= Camilla Läckberg =

Swedish writer (born 1974)

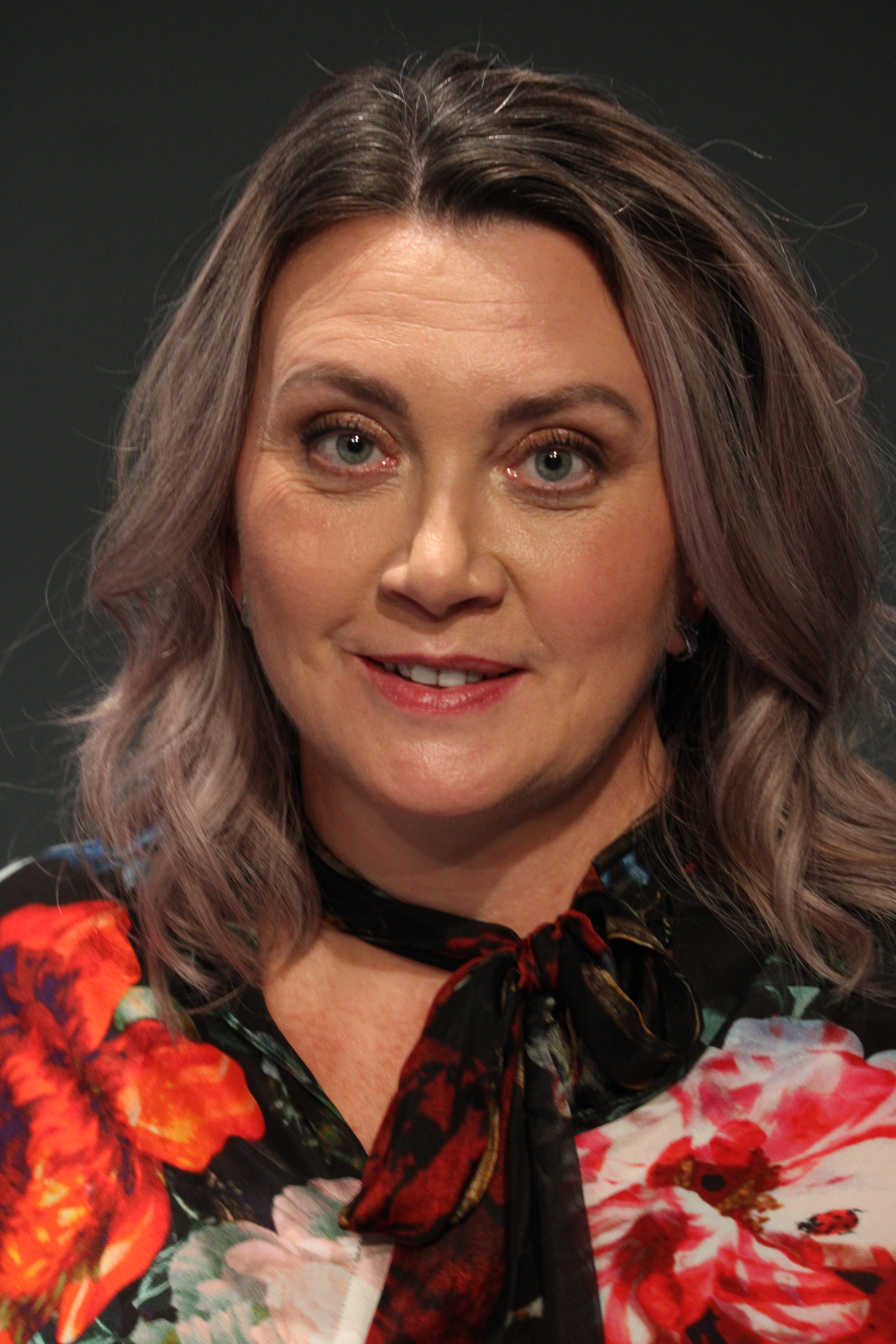
- Läckberg in 2025
- Born: 30 August 1974 (age 52); Fjällbacka, Sweden
- Occupations: Novelist, screenwriter
- Spouses: Micke Eriksson (m. 2000; div. 2006) Martin Melin (m. 2010; div. 2014) Simon Sköld (m. 2017)
- Children: 4
- Writing career
- Genre: Crime fiction
- Notable works: Erica Falck & Patrik Hedström series
- Website: camillalackberg.se/en/

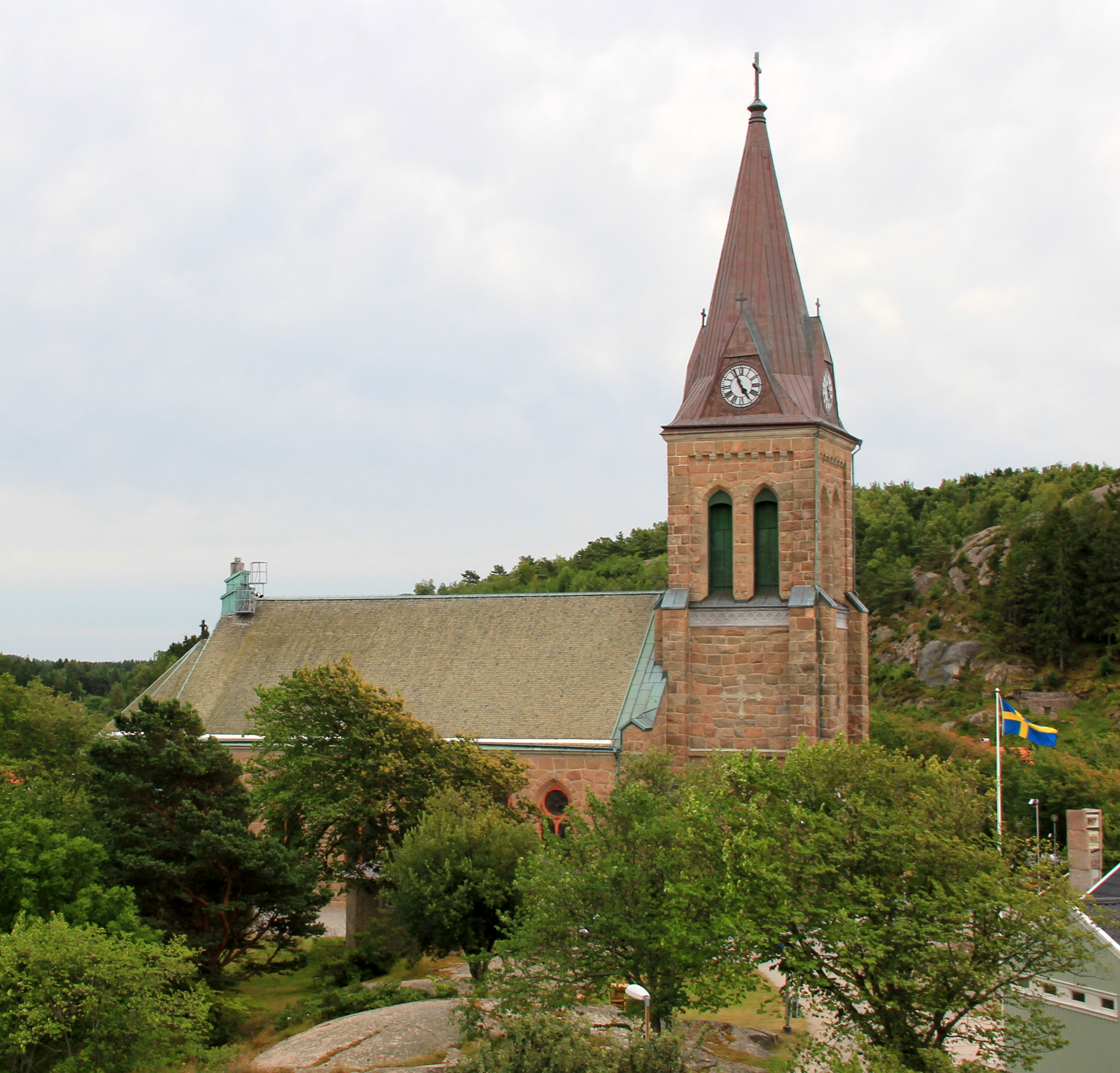
The church in Fjällbacka

Jean Edith Camilla Läckberg (Swedish pronunciation: [kaˈmɪ̂lːa ˈlɛ̂kːbærj]; born 30 August 1974), also known as Camilla Läckberg Eriksson, is a Swedish crime writer and screenwriter. She is especially known for her series of novels set in Fjällbacka and featuring husband-and-wife duo of writer Erica Falck and police detective Patrik Hedström. The first of these, Isprinsessan, was published in Sweden in 2003. As of April 2025 the latest (11th) in the series is Gökungen, published in Sweden in 2022 and translated into English as The Cuckoo in 2024. She published the children's novel Super-Charlie in 2011, which became the first of a series, and the first novel in a new series, The Golden Cage, in 2020. Her work has been published in over 60 countries and sold more than 29 million copies worldwide.

There have been several film and television adaptations of Läckberg's novels, and she has also written for film and television, including the original story and screenplay for the Netflix series The Glass Dome (Glaskupan), released in April 2025.

== Early life and education ==
Jean Edith Camilla Läckberg was born on 30 August 1974 in Fjällbacka, Bohuslän.

She discovered crime fiction on her father's bookshelf at a young age, and the genre has remained a fascination for her ever since. She wrote her first book at the age of four, a dark story featuring Santa Claus, whose wife gets beaten to death.

After graduating from University of Gothenburg's Gothenburg School of Business, Economics and Law with a degree in economics, she moved to Stockholm, where she worked as an economist before beginning writing fiction seriously.

== Career ==
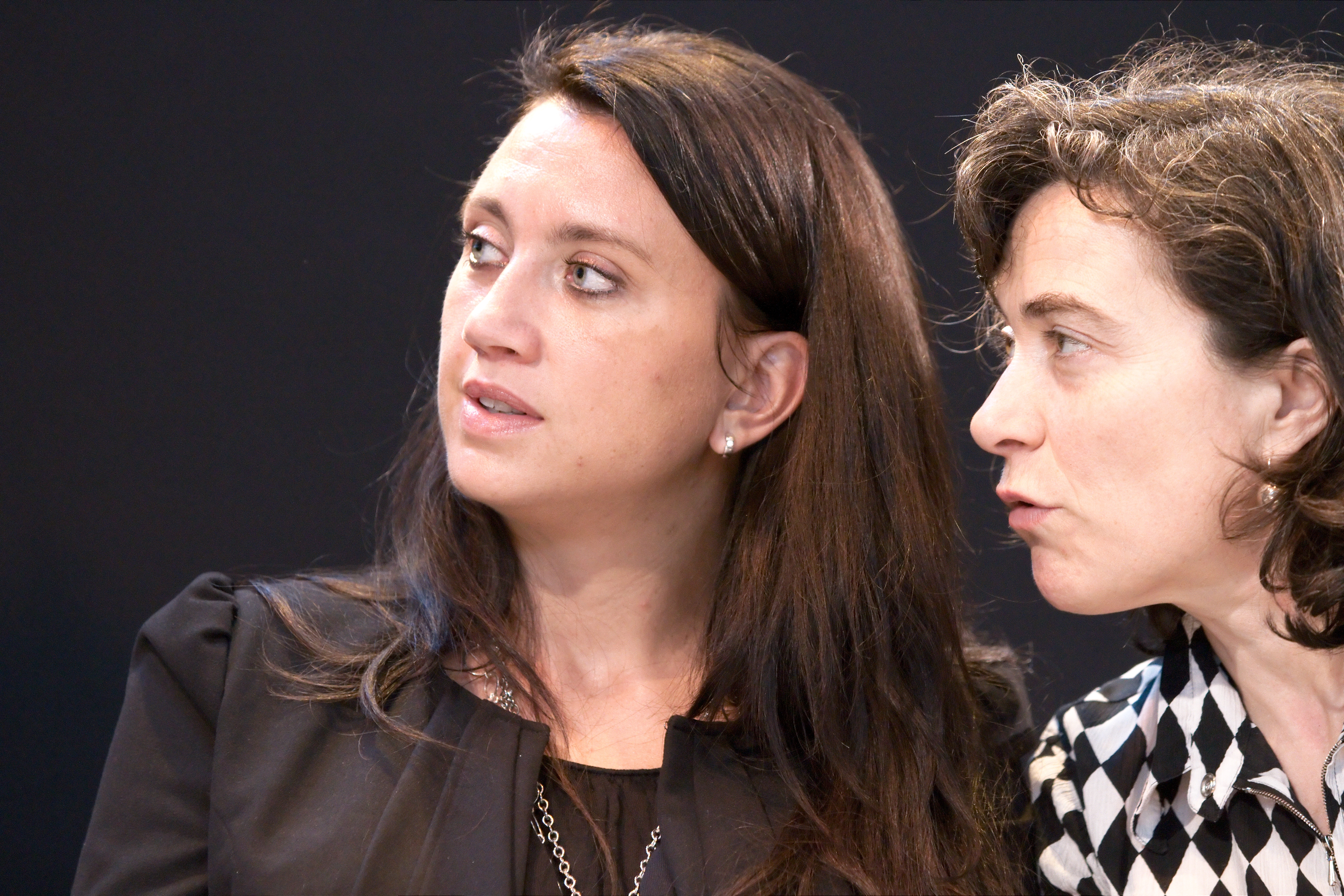
Läckberg with her French translator at the Salon du livre de Paris in 2010

=== Novels ===
In 1999 her parents gave her, as a Christmas present, a writing course called "How to write crime", run by Ordfront. She published her first crime novel, Isprinsessan, in 2003, having started it during the crime writing course. It features the husband-and-wife duo of writer Erica Falck and police detective Patrik Hedström, the first in a series featuring these characters. It was published in English as The Ice Princess in a translation by Steven T. Murray in 2008. Predikanten followed in 2004, translated into English as The Preacher by Murray in 2009; and others followed annually or biannually until the latest (11th in the series), entitled Gökungen, translated into English as The Cuckoo by Ian Giles published in 2024.

In 2011 her children's novel, Super-Charlie, about a baby with superpowers born to ordinary parents, was published. The idea came to her when pregnant with her son Charlie, her third child, and she related stories about the unborn baby. This became the first in a series of books, illustrated by Therese Larsson, with some of them educational.

En bur av guld, translated by Neil Smith as The Golden Cage (Knopf, 2020) and published in the UK and Australia by HarperCollins as The Gilded Cage in 2021, is the first in a new series (Faye's Revenge), with Vingar av silver (literally "Wings of Silver"; translated into English by Ian Giles as Silver Tears) being the second in that series. Described the novel as "a psychological thriller with a feminist plot and a noir vibe", the novel was partly inspired by Fay Weldon's 1983 novel The Life and Loves of a She-Devil. Silver tears was selected by Oprah Daily in 2021 as one of the best books in translation (no. 2 out of 21).

Läckberg has collaborated with Henrik Fexeus on at least three works: Box (2021), Kult (2022), and Mirage (2023).

Another Swedish crime writer, Pascal Engman, has been editor of Läckberg's work at Stockholm publishing house Forum, which has published many of her novels in Swedish. In 2021, Läckberg published the short novel Kvinnor utan nåd (Women Without Mercy). In October 2023, journalist Lapo Lappin of online magazine Kvartal used a "stylographic" data tool to analyse some of Läckberg's novels, which found similarities between her writing in 2019's En bur av guld and the 2020 novel Vingar av silver, and actually identified Engman as principal author of Kvinnor utan nåd. Lappin's article suggested the use of a ghostwriter. Läckberg responded that she had "publicly praised Pascal for helping me write in a way that was new to [her]", as she had needed his help in finding a new style for the new series of Faye's Revenge novels, but that she was the storyteller.

=== Writing style ===
Läckberg has described herself as a visual writer: "For me actually, specific images – snapshots – come first, and then the story starts to come together from those bits and pieces. I am very visual when I write, I 'see' the story in pictures and writing a book is like having a movie running in my head 24/7". In 2011 she listed her top five authors as Siri Hustvedt, Michael Connelly, Ann Rule, Val McDermid, and Peter Robinson. She said that The Secret History, a 1992 novel by Donna Tartt, was her favourite book.

=== Flavours from Fjällbacka ===
Book and CD
- Author: Camilla Läckberg; Christian Hellberg
- Translator: Steven T. Murray
- Language: English (translated from Swedish)
- Genre: Cookery
- Publisher: HarperCollins
- Publication date: 2008
- English publication date: 1 April 2008
- Pages: 400 pages
- ISBN: 0-00-726985-4

Flavours from Fjällbacka (Swedish: Smaker från Fjällbacka) is a cookbook by author Camilla Läckberg and her childhood friend chef Christian Hellberg, who both grew up in Fjällbacka, a municipality in Sweden that provides the theme of the book. Niklas Bernstone provided the photography for the book.

=== Television and film ===
Läckberg's first four novels (Isprinsessan, Predikanten, Stenhuggaren, and Olycksfågeln) were adapted as telemovies between 2007 and 2010, with Elisabet Carlsson and Niklas Hjulström starring as Erica and Patrik.

Filming of the TV series Fjällbackamorden began in August 2011 based on the characters from Läckberg's novels and credited to her authorship, but the stories were new, with actors Claudia Galli and Richard Ulfsäter playing Erica and Patrik. Produced by Tre Vänner Produktion AB, DVDs were released as feature films in 2013 as Fjällbackamorden: Havet ger, havet tar (The Fjällbacka Murders: The Sea Gives, the Sea Takes", dir. Rickard Petrelius); Fjällbackamorden: Ljusets drottning ("The Fjällbacka murders: Queen of Light", dir. Rickard Petrelius); and Fjällbackamorden: Strandridaren ("The Fjällbacka murders: The beach rider", dir. Marcus Olsson). All three were broadcast on SVT1 in 2014 and later on other TV channels.

In 2013, a Swedish film directed by Per Hanefjord titled Tyskungen and based on Lackberg's 2007 novel of the same name (translated into English as The Hidden Child) was released, with Galli and Ulfsäter reprising their roles as Erica and Patrik.

On 25 December 2024, the animated feature film Super-Charlie, a Swedish-Danish co-production produced by Nordisk Film Production Sverige AB, written and directed by Jon Holmberg, was released in Swedish cinemas (and titled Super Charlie for international release). Based on Läckberg's novel of the same name, the film was executive produced by the author. Its alternative title is Super Charlie Begins.

Läckberg is also screenwriter. She created the series Lyckoviken (Lucky Bay) for Swedish television in 2020, and wrote the screenplay for the 2021 film Glaciär (Glacier) as well as serving as executive producer.

She wrote the original story and screenplay for the Netflix series The Glass Dome (Glaskupan), released on 15 April 2025.

A six-episode French series entitled Camilla Läckberg’s Erica will be released in 2026. Adapting The Ice Princess, The Preacher and The Stonecutter, the series stars Julie de Bona as Erica Faure and Grégory Fitoussi as Patrick Saab.

== Other activities ==
In 2009 Hong Kong maternity fashion company Sono Vaso launched in Europe, with the then-pregnant author endorsing the brand.

As of 2016 Läckberg is a business partner in a jewellery company called Sahara Silver Jewelry AB.

She appeared as herself the 2022 satirical black comedy feature film Triangle of Sadness, written and directed by Ruben Östlund.

== Reception ==
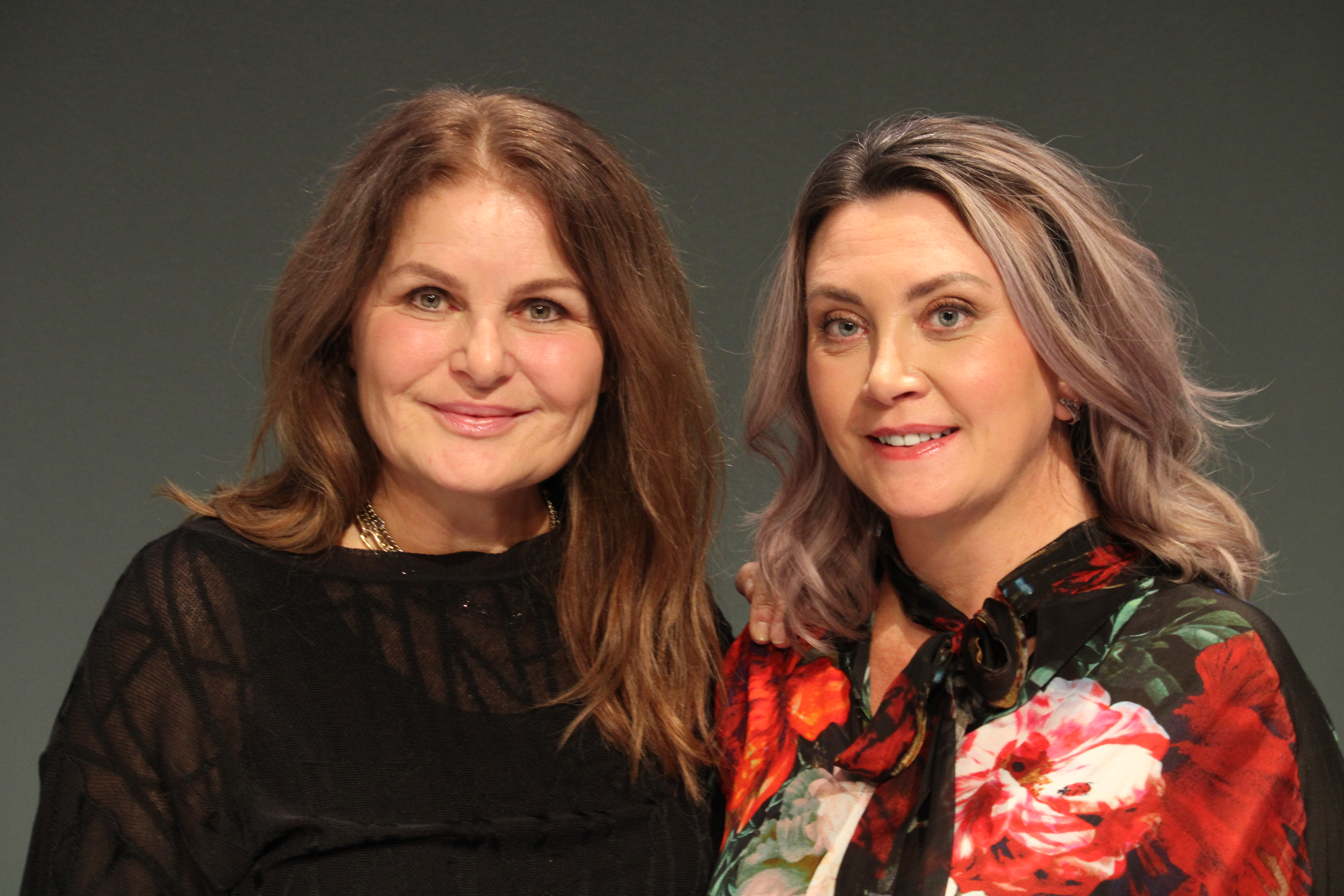
Läckberg with Danish crime writer Sara Blædel at Bogforum 2025 in Copenhagen

Maureen Corrigan of The Washington Post called Läckberg "the Swedish Agatha Christie", while Susie Mesure of The Independent dubbed her "the rock star of Nordic noir".

Läckberg's books have received special praise for detail and "in-depth characterization". Her work has been described as standing out "for its atmospheric depiction of the Swedish coast, well-drawn characters and (at its best) complex and psychologically nuanced plots".

In a review of her novel The Preacher (2012) by The Washington Post, the reviewer noted that the "clever plot and in-depth characterization aren't the only qualities that elevate The Preacher above most other thrillers. There's also an admirable feel for detail."

In reviewing The Golden Cage (2020), The New York Times described it as a "smart, unflinching novel". The Los Angeles Times reviewer was less effusive in her praise, considering it "dated" in the 21st century.

By the early 2010s, her work had been translated into more than 40 languages in 60 countries. By 2023, her work had been published in over 60 countries and sold more than 29 million copies worldwide.

== Recognition and awards ==
- 2005: SKTF Prize for Author of the Year
- 2006: People's Literature Award
- 2008: Grand Prix de Littérature Policière (2008)
- 2021: Nextory E-book Award, for Wings of Silver
- 2023: The Ice Princess listed in Time magazine's 2023 "The 100 Best Mystery and Thriller Books".

== Selected works ==
- 2003: Isprinsessan, translated into English as The Ice Princess by Steven T. Murray and published in the United States in 2010. First in the Patrik Hedström and Erica Falck series.
- 2004: Predikanten, translated into English as The Preacher by Steven T. Murray in 2009. Patrik Hedström and Erica Falck No. 2.
- 2005: Stenhuggaren, translated into English as The Stonecutter by Steven T. Murray in 2008. Patrik Hedström and Erica Falck No. 3.
- 2006: Olycksfågeln, translated into English as The Gallows Bird a.k.a. The Stranger by Steven T. Murray in 2011. The paperback version seems to be called The Stranger; the film is called The Jinx. Patrik Hedström and Erica Falck No. 4.
- 2007: Tyskungen, translated into English as The Hidden Child by Tiina Nunnally in 2011. Patrik Hedström and Erica Falck No. 5.
- 2007: Snöstorm och mandeldoft, a novella translated into English as The Scent of Almonds; included in 2013's Mord och mandeldoft.
- 2008: Sjöjungfrun, translated into English as The Drowning by Tiina Nunnally in 2012. Patrik Hedström and Erica Falck No. 6.
- 2008: Smaker från Fjällbacka, a cookbook co-written with childhood friend and chef Christian Hellberg, with photography by Niklas Bernstone; translated into English as Flavours from Fjällbacka.
- 2009: Fyrvaktaren, translated into English as The Lost Boy by Tiina Nunnally in 2013. Patrik Hedström and Erica Falck No. 7.
- 2011: Änglamakerskan, translated into English as The Angel Maker's Wife, a.k.a. Buried Angels, by Tiina Nunnally in 2014. Patrik Hedström and Erica Falck No. 8.
- 2011: Fest, mat och kärlek, translated into English as Feast, Food & Love.
- 2011: Super-Charlie, translated into English as Super Charlie. Subject of the book is Läckberg's son Charlie.
- 2013: Mord och mandeldoft, translated into English as The Scent of Almonds and Other Stories by Tiina Nunnally in 2015.
- 2014: Lejontämjaren, translated into English as The Ice Child by Tiina Nunnally in 2016. Patrik Hedström and Erica Falck No. 9.
- 2017: Häxan, translated into English as The Girl in the Woods. Patrik Hedström and Erica Falck No. 10.
- 2019: En bur av guld (Forum), translated into English as The Golden Cage (Faye's Revenge, Book 1) in the US in 2020 and The Gilded Cage in the UK and Australia in 2021
- 2020: Vingar av silver (Ester Bonnier Förlag) Translated into English by Ian Giles, published in 2022 as Silver Tears (Faye's Revenge, Book 1) in the UK and Australia
- 2021: Box, co-authored with Henrik Fexeus
- 2022: Kult, co-authored with Henrik Fexeus
- 2022: Gökungen, translated into English as The Cuckoo by Ian Giles in 2024. Patrik Hedström and Erica Falck No. 11.
- 2023: Mirage, co-authored with Henrik Fexeus

== Personal life ==
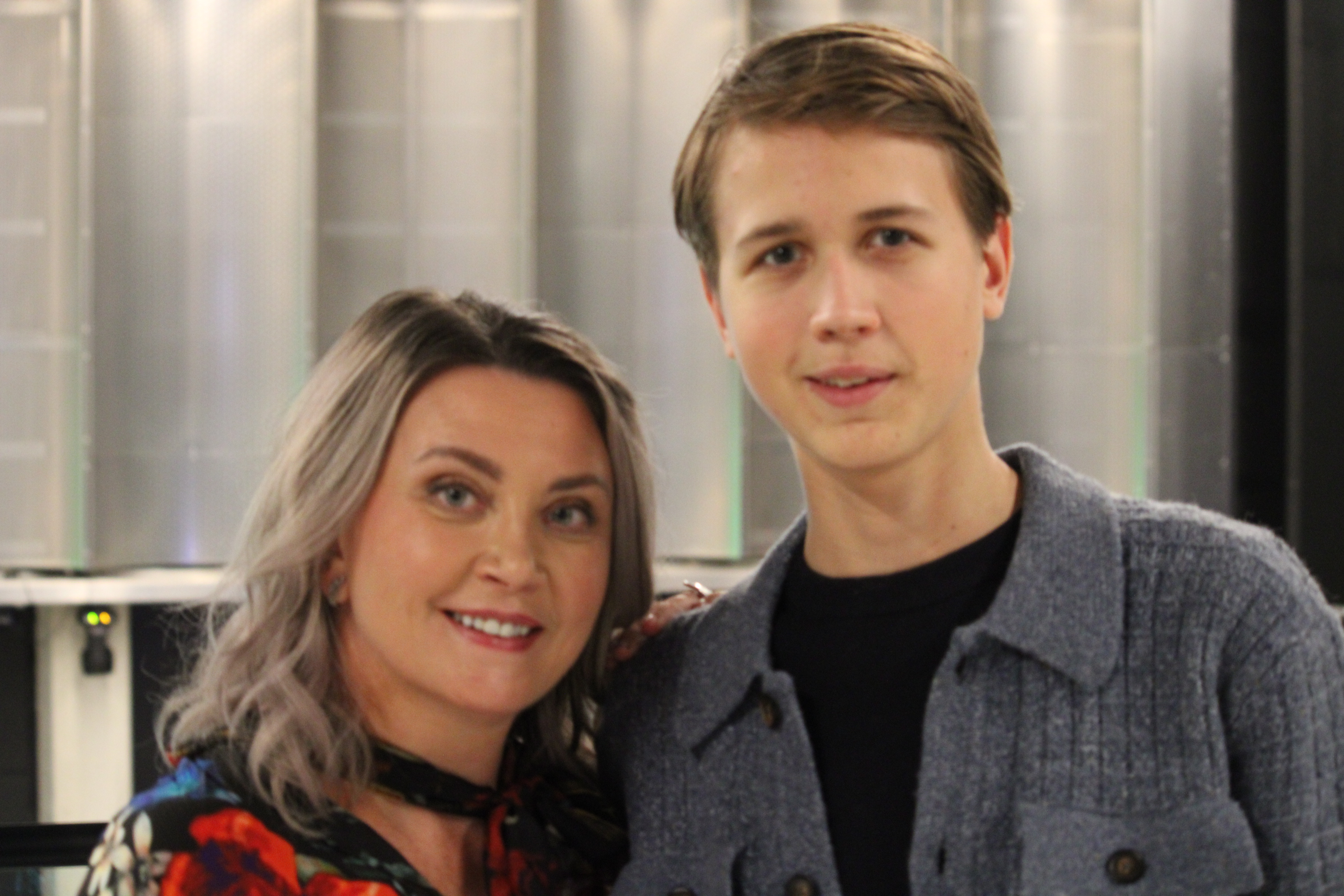
Läckberg with her son Charlie Läckberg Melin at Bogforum 2025 in Copenhagen

Läckberg first married Micke Eriksson; they divorced in 2007. Under Swedish law, as Läckberg's ex-husband, Eriksson was entitled to half the revenue from the contracts signed during their marriage. Eventually it was agreed that she would pay him a lump sum. For some time she was known as Camilla Läckberg Eriksson.

Läckberg married for the second time in 2010, to Martin Melin, winner of Expedition Robinson. The two had met at a 2005 release party for one of her books, then began a working relationship. Melin proposed to Läckberg in August 2009.

In 2015, she was engaged to Simon Sköld, mixed martial arts fighter and author.

Läckberg has four children: Wille and Meja from her first marriage, Charlie from her second, and Polly is from her relationship with Sköld. Charlie is the subject of her first children's book, Super-Charlie.

== See also ==
- List of female mystery writers
- List of women writers
- Swedish Crime Writers' Academy
