= Christian Hellberg =

Swedish chef

External videos
- "Christian reinventing baked potato". TV4 Group.

Christian Hellberg is a Swedish chef.

== Career ==
Hellberg participated several times in from Dinner Secrets from the Abbey. In spring 2008 he was one of the two chefs who competed against each other in "Chefs' Duel". "Chefs' Duel" was under the direction of chef Erik Brännström. Each team had to present an appetizer, main course and dessert.

Hellberg has cooked for events such as banquets for the annual Nobel Peace Prize awards. He had a strong connection with Restaurant Fredsgatan 12, located in the Royal Academy of Arts buildings, a cultural monument opposite Rosenbad in Stockholm. He became head chef at Restaurant Curman, located in historic Sturebadet in Stockholm, in 2009.

In 2011, Hellberg started presenting and contributing to Swedish television cooking programmes. He hosted the TV program Grill!.

== Publications ==
Hellberg is co-author of the cookbook Smaker från Fjällbacka, translated into English as Flavours from Fjällbacka (2008), along with his childhood friend Camilla Läckberg. Photography was by Niklas Bernstone.

== Recognition ==
Hellberg was named "Chef of the Year" in 2001.
