= The Lost Boy (novel) =

2009 novel by Camilla Läckberg

- First edition (publ. Bokförlaget Forum)
- Author: Camilla Läckberg
- Original title: Fyrvaktaren
- Language: Swedish
- Publisher: Publisher Bokförlaget Forum (Swedish) Houghton Mifflin Harcourt (English)
- Publication date: 16 September 2009
- Publication place: Sweden
- English publication date: March 2013
- ISBN: 978-91-371-3409-3 Swedish hardcover
- OCLC: 818449670

The Lost Boy (original title: Fyrvaktaren) is a 2009 Swedish detective novel by Camilla Läckberg, In 2012, HarperCollins published an English-language edition, translated by Tiina Nunnally. This is the seventh book in Läckberg's series about husband-and-wife duo police detective Patrik Hedström and writer Erica Falck.

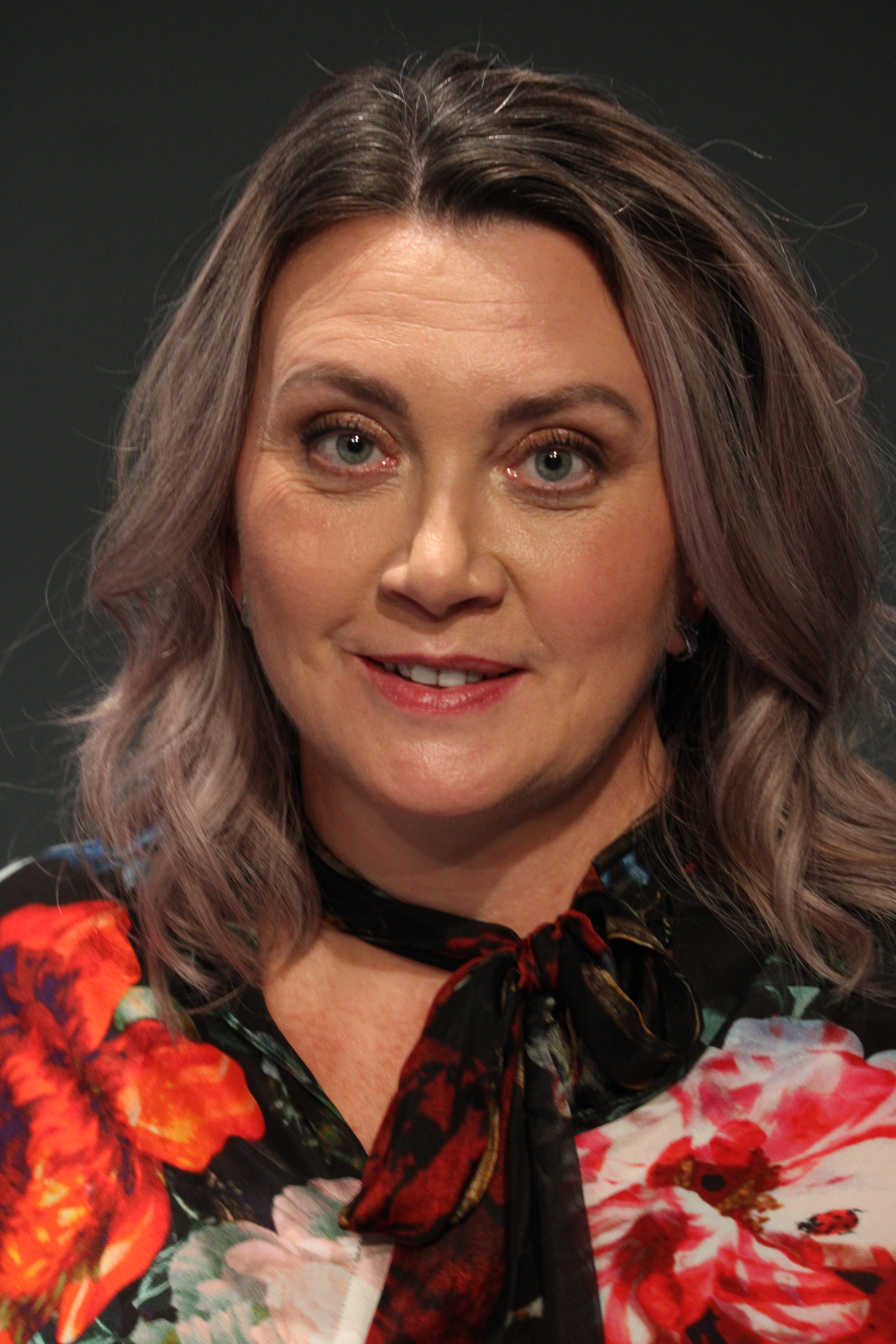
Camilla Läckberg

== Plot ==
After returning to work following an illness, police inspector Patrik Hedstrom investigates the murder of Mats Sverin, the financial director of the Fjallbacka local council. The investigation examines Sverin's work on the conversion of a hotel into a spa, his unexplained return from Gothenburg, and his relationship with his former girlfriend Annie, who has returned to the area with her son. Annie is living on Graskar, an island associated with local stories of hauntings and with events from her families past.
