= Peder Lamm =

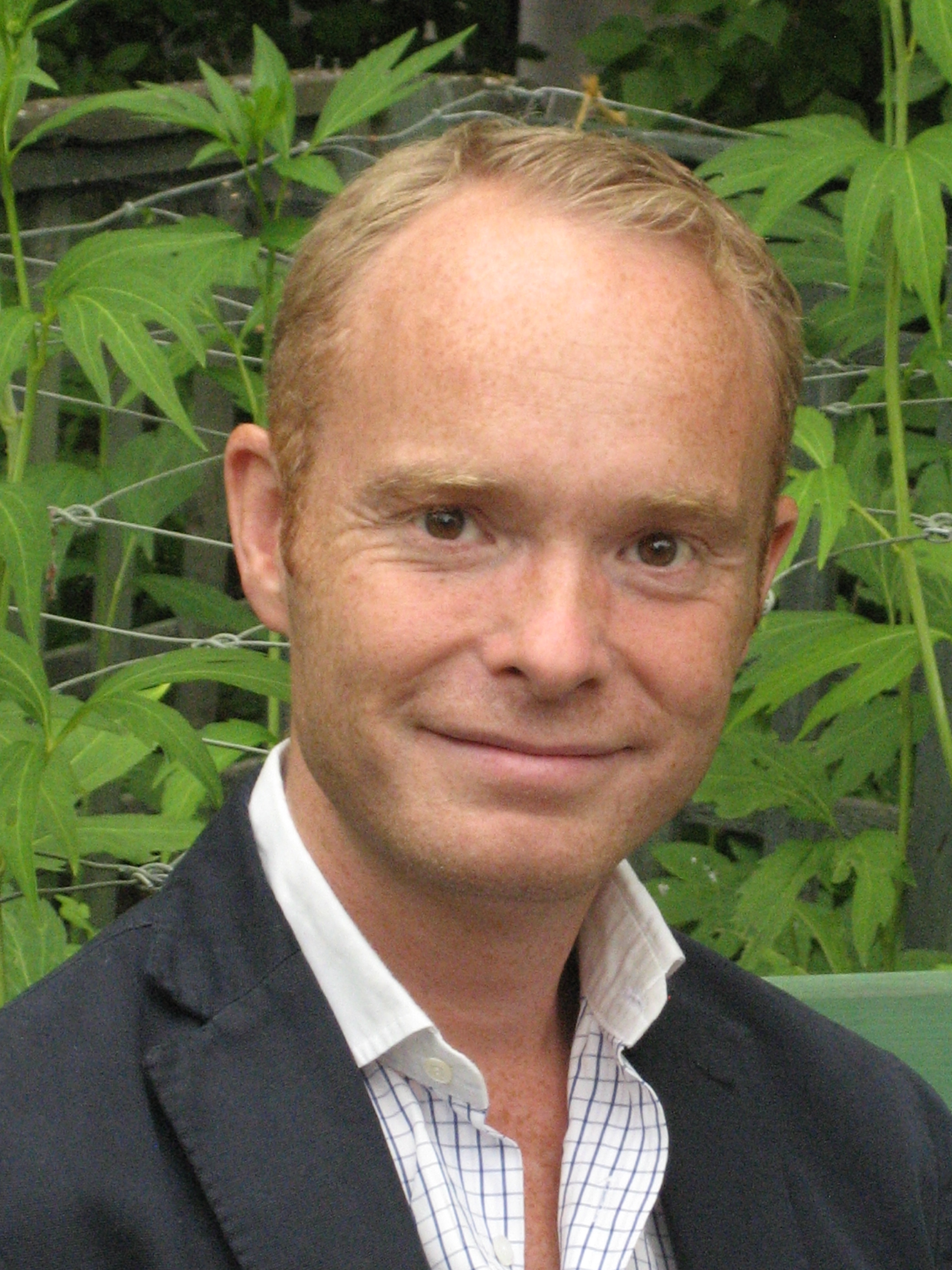
- Peder Lamm (2008)
- Born: 4 December 1970 (age 55); Lidingö, Sweden
- Occupation: Antiques expert

Peder Lamm (born 4 December 1970) is a Swedish antiques expert and television personality, best known for his work at Otroligt antikt which is broadcast on SVT. Besides Otroligt antikt Lamm has also participated in På spåret, Extra Extra and Kockduellen.

Lamm was born in Lidingö, Sweden, the son of Jan Peder Lamm.
