= The Hidden Child =

2007 novel by Camilla Läckberg

- Author: Camilla Läckberg
- Translator: Tiina Nunnally
- Language: English
- Subject: Popular Fiction/Contemporary Thrillers
- Genre: Crime
- Publisher: Harper
- Publication date: 2007
- English publication date: 2011
- Pages: 400 pages
- ISBN: 0-00-741949-X
- Preceded by: Flavours from Fjällbacka
- Followed by: Super Charlie

The Hidden Child (Swedish: Tyskungen) is a novel written by Swedish writer Camilla Läckberg.

Crime writer Erika Falck, wife of Detective Patrik Hedström, is shocked to discover a Nazi medal wrapped inside a child's dress stained with blood, and a wartime diary among her late mother's possessions dating from the World War II era. Haunted by childhood memories of a cold, detached mother, she decides to investigate, unwittingly endangering her husband and newborn baby.

== Plot ==
This is regarded as one of the more plot-driven novels in the series, with more emphasis on the story. Erika wants to write a 'great book' so Patrik goes on paternity leave to look after their baby while Erika writes her book. However, she becomes distracted by the discovery of her late mother's wartime diaries and a Nazi medal and consults with a local World War II historian. However, shortly after her visit, he is brutally murdered and it becomes clear that the past is still very much a part of some people's lives. The plot focuses on the discovery of a child's blood-spattered dress plus other memorabilia. Who would murder so cold-bloodedly to bury secrets so ancient?

It soon becomes an interwoven plot of neo-Nazi Swedish politics, old friends with old secrets, ex-wives coming back into play, and a poor Patrik who is trying desperately to balance his role as a new father and his desire to help his fellow detectives.

By way of a side-theme, the local police station's chief, Mellberg is talked into reluctantly adopting a stray dog, finding that this leads to a meeting with another dog-owner (and salsa teacher) who happens to be the mother of his new detective, Paula Morales, both of whom are immigrants to Sweden from Chile. This provides a counterpoint to the increasingly sordid facts being unearthed in the search for the murderer.

== Film ==
A Swedish-language film version of The Hidden Child was released in 2013 by Tre Vänner AB.
