= Starke man =

Swedish television series

Starke man is a 2010 Swedish comedy series broadcast on SVT. The series focuses on local politics in Svinarp, a fictitious small municipality in the south of Sweden, which the press has branded the second-most boring municipality of Scania in the pilot episode. Much of the series revolves around Lars-Göran Bengtsson, the less-than competent social democrat mayor of Svinarp, who is usually saved from disaster by his disillusioned staff. Starke man was written by Wiktor Ericsson and Anders Jansson with Anders Jansson (as Lars-Göran Bengtsson), Magnus Mark and Anna Blomberg in the main roles.

The first episode was broadcast on 26 September 2010. The second season was broadcast in 2011.

The series was filmed in Kävlinge, Sweden.
