= Playa del Sol =

Swedish television series

Playa del Sol is a Swedish comedy, directed by Peter Settman and Leif Lindblom (season 1) and Jon Holmberg and Kicki Kjellin (season 2), which were broadcast on Sundays at 20.00 on SVT 1. The series consists of two seasons, with a total of 25 half-hour episodes (12 episodes in season 1 & 13 in season 2). Season 1 was broadcast from 21 January 2007 to 15 April 2007 while season 2 aired from 27 September 2009 to 20 December 2009. Starring Mikael Tornving and Henrik Hjelt. The first episode was seen by over 2.36 million viewers. A third season aired in August 2019.

== Action ==
The first season of the series takes place in Gran Canaria and was filmed in Playa del Inglés on Gran Canaria in the spring/summer of 2006. The second season takes place in Mallorca.

== Main roles (season 1) ==
- Henrik Hjelt - Mårten Bergström
- Mikael Tornving - Tommy Andersson
- Saga Gärde - Sandra
- Josephine Bornebusch - Linn
- Richard Ulfsäter - Steffen
- Christian Wennberg - Gabriel

== Main roles (season 2) ==
- Henrik Hjelt - Mårten
- Mikael Tornving - Tommy
- Marie Robertson - Klara
- Richard Ulfsäter - Steffen
