= The Glass Dome =

2025 Swedish crime drama series

- Genre: Crime; Detective; Mystery; Thriller
- Screenplay by: Amanda Hogberg
- Directed by: Lisa Farzaneh; Henrik Björn
- Starring: Léonie Vincent; Johan Hedenberg; Johan Rheborg
- Country of origin: Sweden
- Original language: Swedish
- No. of seasons: 1
- No. of episodes: 6

Production
- Executive producer: Camilla Läckberg
- Production company: Creative Society Production

Original release
- Network: Netflix
- Release: 15 April 2025

The Glass Dome (Swedish: Glaskupan) is a Swedish crime drama series created by Camilla Läckberg, who also served as executive producer. The series premiered on Netflix on 15 April 2025. It is directed by Lisa Farzaneh and Henrik Björn.

== Synopsis ==
The series takes place in a tiny fictional community in Sweden called Granås, the home town of the series' protagonist, Leijla, who is a behavioural scientist and criminologist. The series begins when Lejla returns home from the United States, where she has been living and working, after her adoptive father, retired police chief Valter, phones her to say that his wife had died suddenly. The place evokes mixed feelings in her, as she had been abducted there by an unknown perpetrator as a little girl, and held captive for some time.

== Cast ==
- Léonie Vincent - Lejla Ness
- Johan Hedenberg - Valter Ness
- Johan Rheborg - Tomas Ness
- Farzad Farzaneh - Said
- Ia Langhammer - Jorun
- Cecilia Nilsson - Kristina
- Emil Almén - Björn
- Emma Broomé - Aino
- Oscar Töringe - Martin
- Ville Virtanen - Tage
- Minoo Andacheh – Alicia
- Jonny Karlsson
- Bianca Lynxén

== Production ==
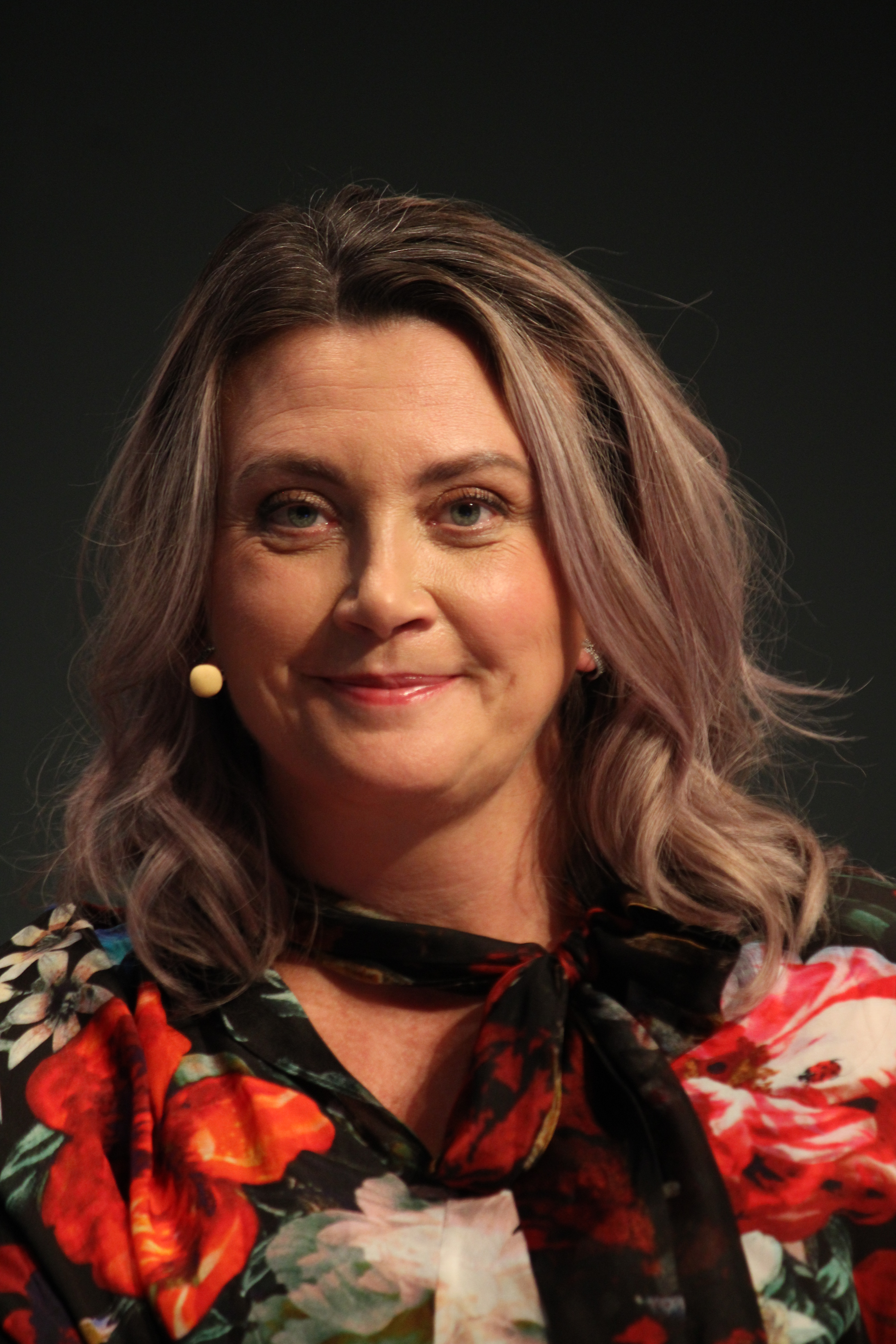
Camilla Läckberg

Glaskupan was created by Swedish crime writer Camilla Läckberg. The script was written by Amanda Högberg and Axel Stjärne.

== Release ==
The Glass Dome was released on Netflix on 15 April 2025.

== Reception ==
Paul Hirons, writing for The Killing Times, calls the series a solid, binge-worthy thriller with just enough atmosphere to make it interesting. Other reviews published soon after its release were generally positive.

== Viewership ==
According to data from Showlabs, The Glass Dome ranked seventh on Netflix in the United States during the week of 14–20 April 2025.
