= Fjällbacka =

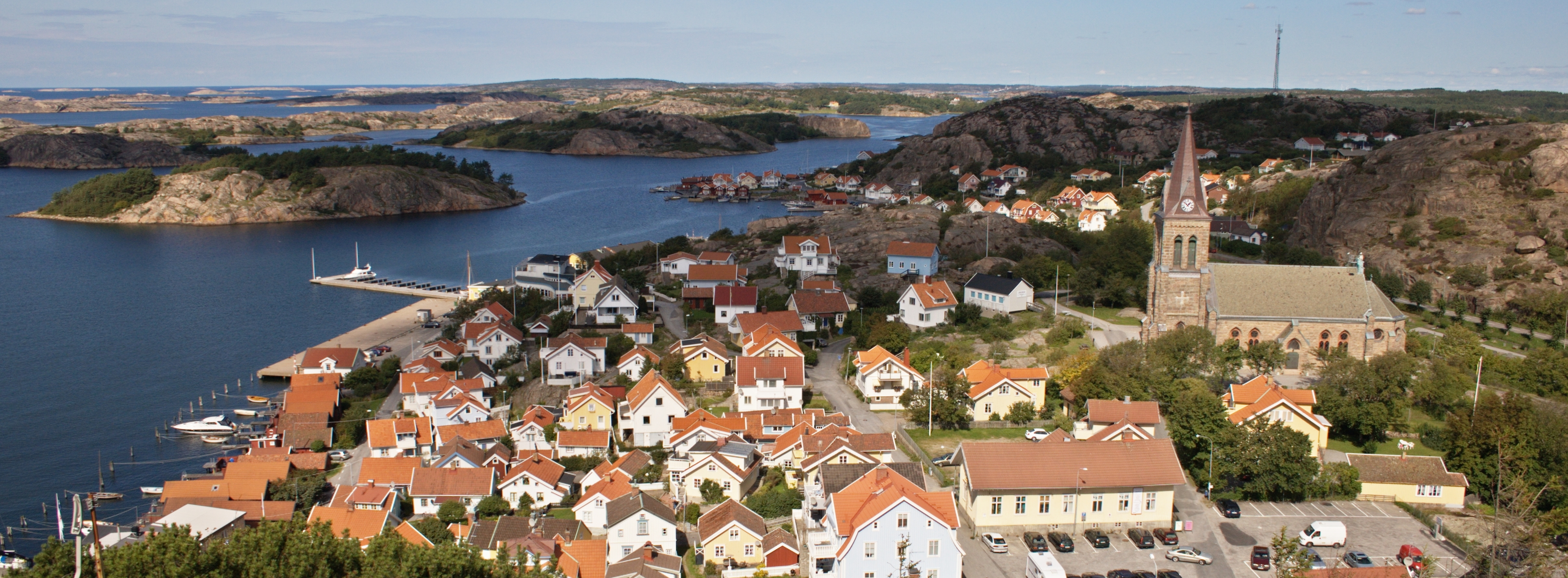
- Fjällbacka from above in August 2008.

- Location within Västra Götaland Location within Sweden
- Coordinates: 58°36′N 11°17′E
- Country: Sweden
- Province: Bohuslän
- County: Västra Götaland County
- Municipality: Tanum Municipality

Area
  - Total: 1.05 km^{2} (0.41 sq mi)

Population (31 December 2010)
  - Total: 859
  - Density: 819/km^{2} (2,120/sq mi)
- Time zone: UTC+1 (CET)
  - Summer (DST): UTC+2 (CEST)

Fjällbacka is a locality situated in Tanum Municipality, Västra Götaland County, Sweden, with 859 inhabitants in 2010. It is located approximately 150 km (93 mi) from Gothenburg, 165 km (103 mi) from Oslo and 520 km (320 mi) from Stockholm, and is mostly known as a summer tourist resort.

Fjällbacka is a small fishing village on the coastline almost exactly equidistant between Uddevalla and Strömstad. Established in the 1600s, the town's name derives from the large mountain behind it.

It is also known the birthplace of and setting for many of best-selling Swedish noir writer Camilla Läckberg's novels, several of which were adapted for television, including the 2025 Netflix series The Glass Dome (Glaskupan).

The actress Ingrid Bergman lived here when she visited Sweden.
